= Turkey =

Country in Southeastern Europe and West Asia

Republic of Türkiye Türkiye Cumhuriyeti (Turkish)
- Flag
- Anthem: İstiklal Marşı "Independence March"
- Capital: Ankara; 39°55′N 32°51′E
- Largest city: Istanbul; 41°1′N 28°57′E
- Official languages: Turkish
- Common languages: Predominantly Turkish; List: Kurdish; Zaza; Arabic; Circassian; Laz; Greek; Armenian; Albanian; Bosnian; Bulgarian; Other languages
- Ethnic groups (2016): 70–75% Turkish; 19% Kurdish; 6–11% other minorities
- Demonyms: Turkish; Turk
- Government: Unitary presidential republic
  - President: Recep Tayyip Erdoğan
  - Vice President: Cevdet Yılmaz
  - Speaker: Numan Kurtulmuş
  - Chief Justice: Kadir Özkaya
- Legislature: Grand National Assembly

Establishment
  - Ottoman Empire: c. 1299
  - War of Independence: 19 May 1919
  - Government of the Grand National Assembly: 23 April 1920
  - Sultanate abolished: 1 November 1922
  - Treaty of Lausanne: 24 July 1923
  - Republic declared: 29 October 1923
  - Current constitution: 9 November 1982

Area
  - Total: 783,562 km^{2} (302,535 sq mi) (36th)
  - Water (%): 2.03

Population
  - December 2025 estimate: ▲86,092,168 (18th)
  - Density: 112/km^{2} (290.1/sq mi) (83rd)
- GDP (PPP): 2026 estimate
  - Total: ▲$4.026 trillion (11th)
  - Per capita: ▲$46,679 (51st)
- GDP (nominal): 2026 estimate
  - Total: ▲$1.818 trillion (16th)
  - Per capita: ▲$21,079 (63rd)
- Gini (2023): ▼43.7 medium inequality
- HDI (2023): 0.853 very high (51st)
- Currency: Turkish lira (₺) (TRY)
- Time zone: UTC+3 (TRT)
- Date format: dd.mm.yyyy
- Calling code: +90
- ISO 3166 code: TR
- Internet TLD: .tr

Turkey, (Note: Turkish: Türkiye [ˈtyɾcije]) officially the Republic of Türkiye, (Note: Turkish: Türkiye Cumhuriyeti [ˈtyɾcije dʒumˈhuːɾijeti]) is a country mainly located in Anatolia in West Asia, with a smaller part called East Thrace in Southeast Europe. It borders the Black Sea to the north; Georgia, Armenia, Azerbaijan, and Iran to the east; Iraq, Syria, and the Mediterranean Sea to the south; and the Aegean Sea, Greece, and Bulgaria to the west. Turkey is home to over 86 million people; most are ethnic Turks, while Kurds are the largest ethnic minority. Officially a secular state, Turkey has a Muslim-majority population. Ankara is Turkey's capital and second-largest city. Istanbul is its largest city and economic center. Other major cities include İzmir, Bursa, and Antalya.

First inhabited by modern humans during the Late Paleolithic, present-day Turkey was home to various ancient peoples. The Hattians were assimilated by the Hittites and other Anatolian peoples. Classical Anatolia underwent cultural Hellenization after Alexander the Great's conquests, and later Romanization during the Roman and Byzantine eras. The Seljuk Turks began migrating into Anatolia in the 11th century, starting the Turkification process. The Seljuk Sultanate of Rum ruled Anatolia until the Mongol invasion in 1243, when it disintegrated into Turkish principalities. Beginning in 1299, the Ottomans united the principalities and expanded. Constantinople (modern-day Istanbul) was conquered in 1453 by Mehmed II. During the reigns of Selim I and Suleiman the Magnificent, the Ottoman Empire became a global power. From 1789 onwards, the empire saw major changes, reforms, centralization, and rising nationalism while its territory declined.

In the 19th and early 20th centuries, the persecution of Muslims during the Ottoman contraction and in the Russian Empire resulted in large-scale loss of life and mass migration into modern-day Turkey from the Balkans, Caucasus, and Crimea. Under the control of the Three Pashas, the Ottoman Empire entered World War I in 1914, during which the Ottoman government committed genocides against its Armenian, Greek, and Assyrian subjects. Following Ottoman defeat, the Turkish War of Independence resulted in the abolition of the sultanate and the signing of the Treaty of Lausanne, and Turkey emerged as a more homogenous nation state. The Republic was proclaimed on 29 October 1923, modelled on the reforms initiated by its founder and first president, Mustafa Kemal Atatürk. Turkey remained neutral during most of World War II, but was involved in the Korean War, and more significantly, in the Cyprus conflict. Several military interventions interfered with the transition to a multi-party system.

Turkey is an upper-middle-income and emerging country; its economy is the world's 16th-largest by nominal and 11th-largest by PPP-adjusted GDP. As the 15th-largest electricity producer in the world, Turkey aims to become a hub for regional energy transportation. It is a unitary presidential republic. Turkey is a founding member of the OECD, G20, and Organization of Turkic States. With a geopolitically significant location, Turkey is a NATO member and has its second-largest military personnel. It may be recognized as an emerging, a middle, and a regional power. As an EU candidate, Turkey is part of the EU Customs Union.

Turkey has coastal plains, a high central plateau, and various mountain ranges with rising elevation eastwards. Turkey's climate is diverse, ranging from Mediterranean and other temperate climates to semi-arid and continental types. Home to three biodiversity hotspots, Turkey is prone to frequent earthquakes and is highly vulnerable to climate change. Turkey has a universal healthcare system, growing access to education, and increasing levels of innovativeness. It is a leading TV content exporter. With numerous UNESCO World Heritage sites and intangible cultural heritage inscriptions, and a rich and diverse cuisine, Turkey attracts tourists from around the world.

== Etymology ==
Turchia, meaning "the land of the Turks", had begun to be used in European texts for Anatolia by the end of the 12th century. As a word in Turkic languages, Turk may mean "strong, strength, ripe" or "flourishing, in full strength". It may also mean ripe as in for a fruit or "in the prime of life, young, and vigorous" for a person. As an ethnonym, the etymology is still unknown. In addition to usage in languages such as Chinese in the 6th century, the earliest mention of Turk (𐱅𐰇𐰺𐰜, türü̲k̲; or 𐱅𐰇𐰼𐰚, türk/tẄrk) in Turkic languages comes from the Second Turkic Khaganate.

In Byzantine sources in the 10th century, the name Tourkia was used for defining two medieval states: Hungary (Western Tourkia); and Khazaria (Eastern Tourkia). The Bahri Mamluk Sultanate, with its ruling elite of Turkic origin, was called the "State of the Turks" (Dawlat at-Turk, or Dawlat al-Atrāk, or Dawlat-at-Turkiyya). Turkestan, also meaning the "land of the Turks", was used for a historic region in Central Asia.

Middle English usage of Turkye or Turkeye is found in The Book of the Duchess (written in 1369–1372) to refer to Anatolia or the Ottoman Empire. The modern spelling Turkey dates back to at least 1719. The bird called turkey was named as such due to trade of guineafowl from Turkey to England. By the mid-19th century, the name Turkey was sometimes used in referring to international treaties of the Ottoman Empire. In 1920, the Government of the Grand National Assembly adopted the name Türkiye Devleti ("State of Turkey"). With the Treaty of Alexandropol of December 1920, the name Türkiye entered international documents for the first time. In the treaty signed with Afghanistan in 1921, the expression Devlet-i Âliyye-i Türkiyye ("Sublime Turkish State") was used, likened to the Ottoman Empire's name.

Upon the proclamation of the republic on 29 October 1923, the name Türkiye Cumhuriyeti (توركيه جمهوريتى) was adopted. In December 2021, President Recep Tayyip Erdoğan called for expanded official usage of Türkiye, saying that Türkiye "represents and expresses the culture, civilization, and values of the Turkish nation in the best way". In May 2022, the Turkish government requested the United Nations and other international organizations to use Republic of Türkiye officially in English; the UN agreed. Until 2022, its official English name remained the Republic of Turkey. Though not official, the term Turkish Republic is sometimes used in descriptive, historic, or academic contexts.

== History ==
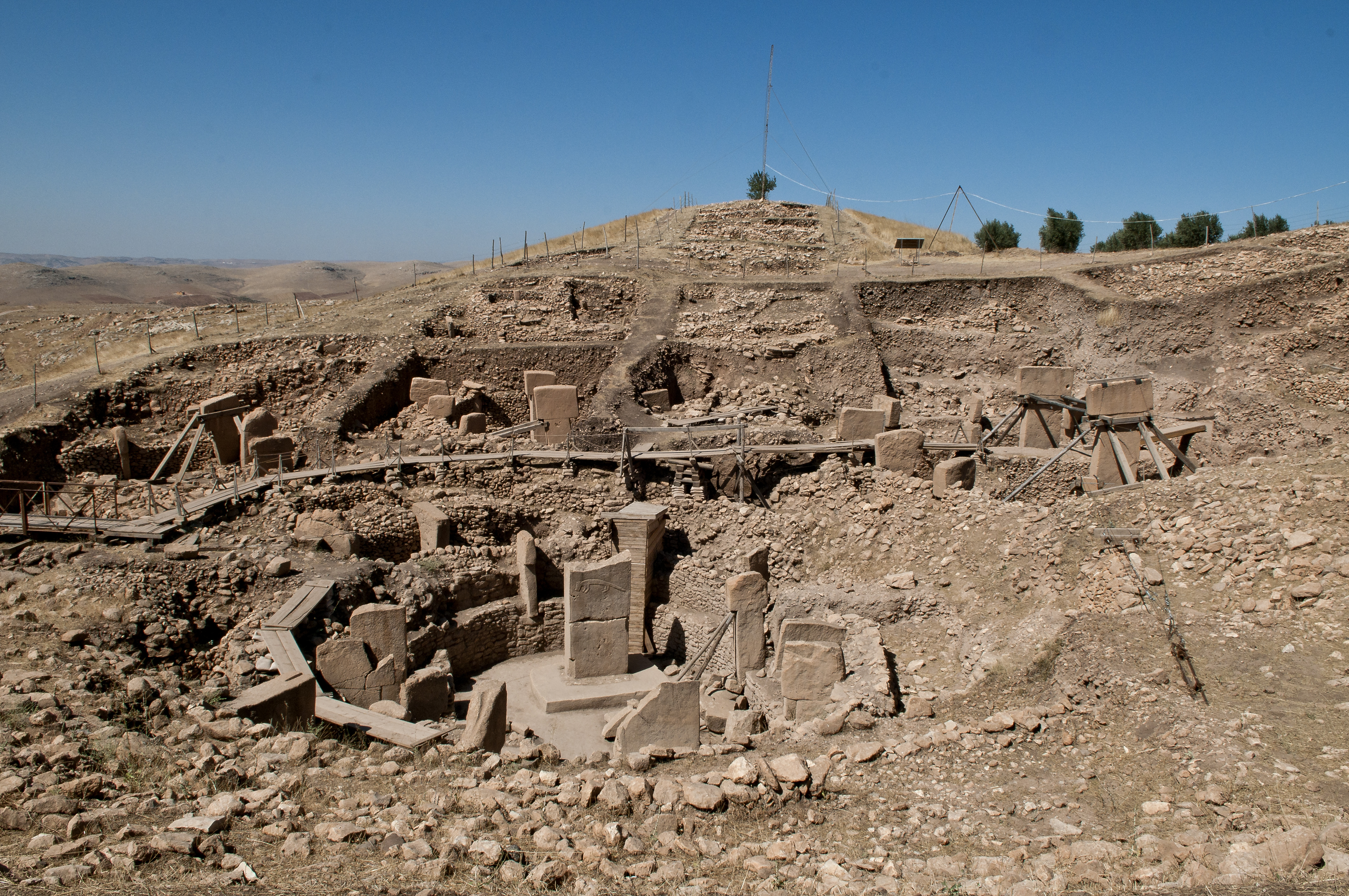
Some henges at Göbekli Tepe were erected as far back as 9600 BC, predating those of Stonehenge by over seven millennia.

=== Prehistory and ancient history ===
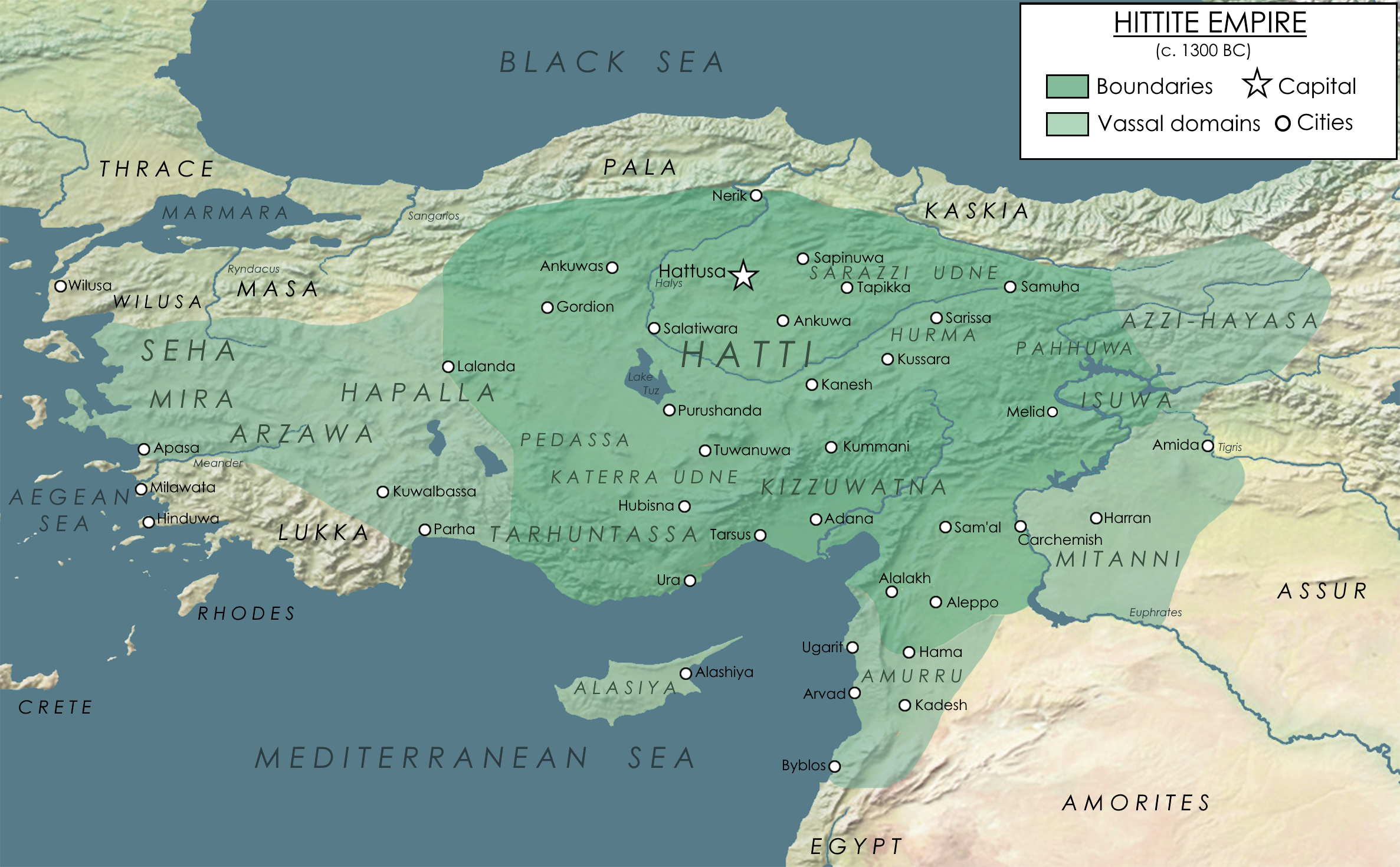
Map of the Hittite Empire at its greatest extent, with Hittite rule c. 1300 BC

Present-day Turkey has been inhabited by modern humans since the late Paleolithic period and contains some of the world's oldest Neolithic sites. Göbekli Tepe is close to 12,000 years old. Parts of Anatolia include the Fertile Crescent, an origin of agriculture. Other important Anatolian Neolithic sites include Çatalhöyük and Alaca Höyük. Neolithic Anatolian farmers differed genetically from farmers in Iran and Jordan Valley. These early Anatolian farmers also migrated into Europe, starting around 9,000 years ago. Troy's earliest layers go back to around 4500 BC.

Anatolia's historical records start with clay tablets from approximately around 2000 BC that were found in modern-day Kültepe. These tablets belonged to an Assyrian trade colony. The languages in Anatolia at that time included Hattian, Hurrian, Hittite, Luwian, and Palaic. Hattian was a language indigenous to Anatolia, with no known modern-day connections. Hurrian language was used in northern Syria. Hittite, Palaic, and Luwian languages were "the oldest written Indo-European languages", forming the Anatolian sub-group. (Note: The origin of Indo-European languages is unknown. They may be native to Anatolia or non-native.)

Hattian rulers were gradually replaced by Hittite rulers. The Hittite kingdom was a large kingdom in Central Anatolia, with its capital of Hattusa. It co-existed in Anatolia with Palaians and Luwians, approximately between 1700 and 1200 BC. As the Hittite kingdom was disintegrating, further waves of Indo-European peoples migrated from southeastern Europe, which was followed by warfare. The Thracians were also present in modern-day Turkish Thrace. It is not known if the Trojan War is based on historical events. Troy's Late Bronze Age layers matches most with Iliad's story.

=== Early classical antiquity ===
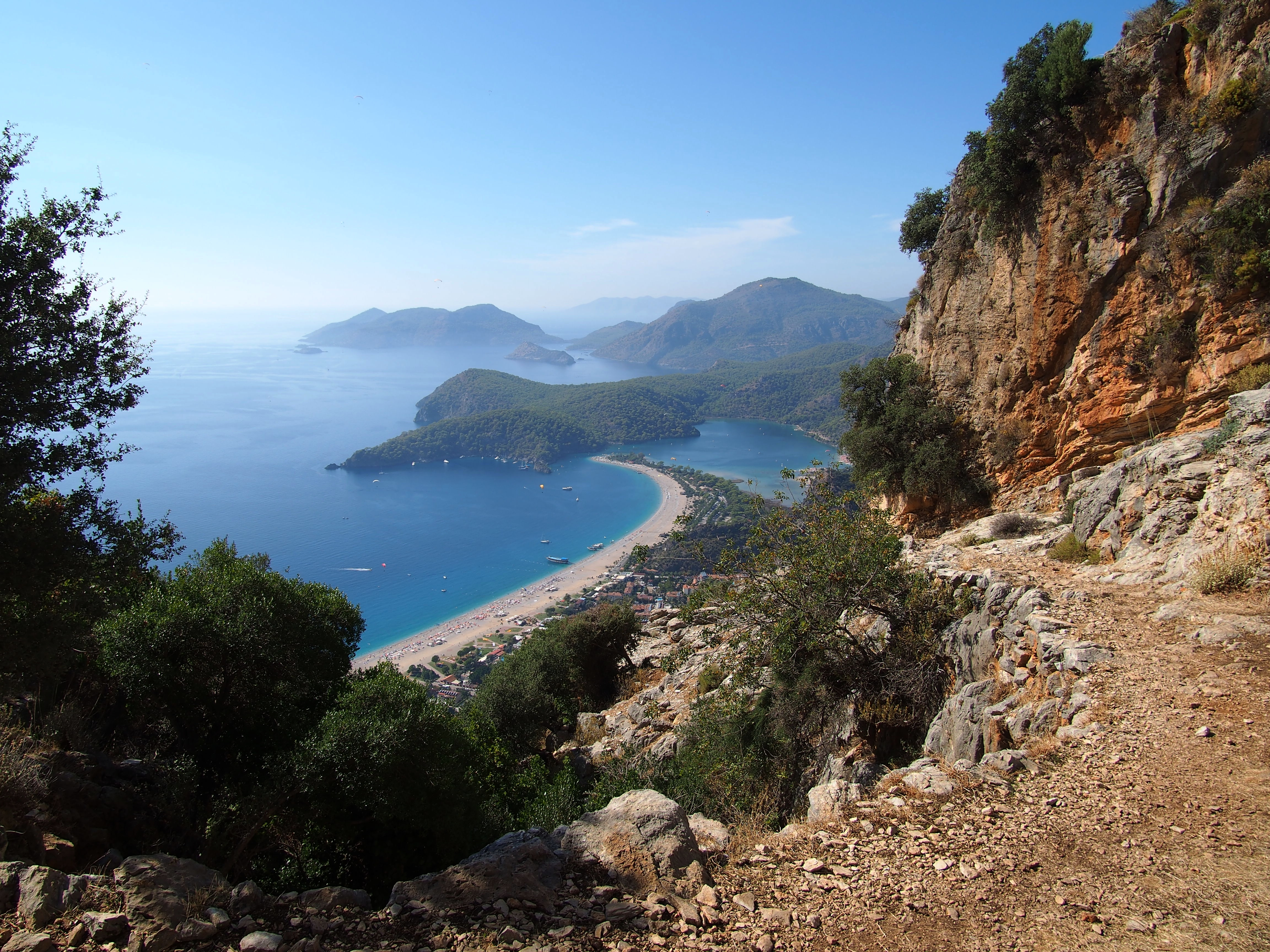
The Lycian Way is a 760 kilometers (470 mi) long hiking path in Southwestern Turkey.

Around 750 BC, Phrygia had been established, with its two centers in Gordium and modern-day Kayseri. Phrygians spoke an Indo-European language, which was closer to Greek than Anatolian languages. Phrygians shared Anatolia with Neo-Hittites and Urartu. Luwian-speakers were probably the majority in various Anatolian Neo-Hittite states. Urartians spoke a non-Indo-European language and their capital was around Lake Van. Urartu and Phrygia fell in seventh century BC. They were replaced by Carians, Lycians and Lydians. These three cultures "can be considered a reassertion of the ancient, indigenous culture of the Hattian cities of Anatolia".

In the late Bronze Age, there were three or four Greek-speaking settlements in Anatolia, including Miletus. Around 1000 BC, Greeks started migrating to the west coast of Anatolia. These eastern Greek settlements played a vital role in shaping the Archaic Greek civilization; important cities included Miletus, Ephesus, Halicarnassus, Smyrna (now İzmir) and Byzantium (now Istanbul). These settlements were grouped as Aeolis, Ionia, and Doris, after the specific Greek groups that settled them. Further Greek colonization in Anatolia was led by Miletus and Megara in 750–480 BC.

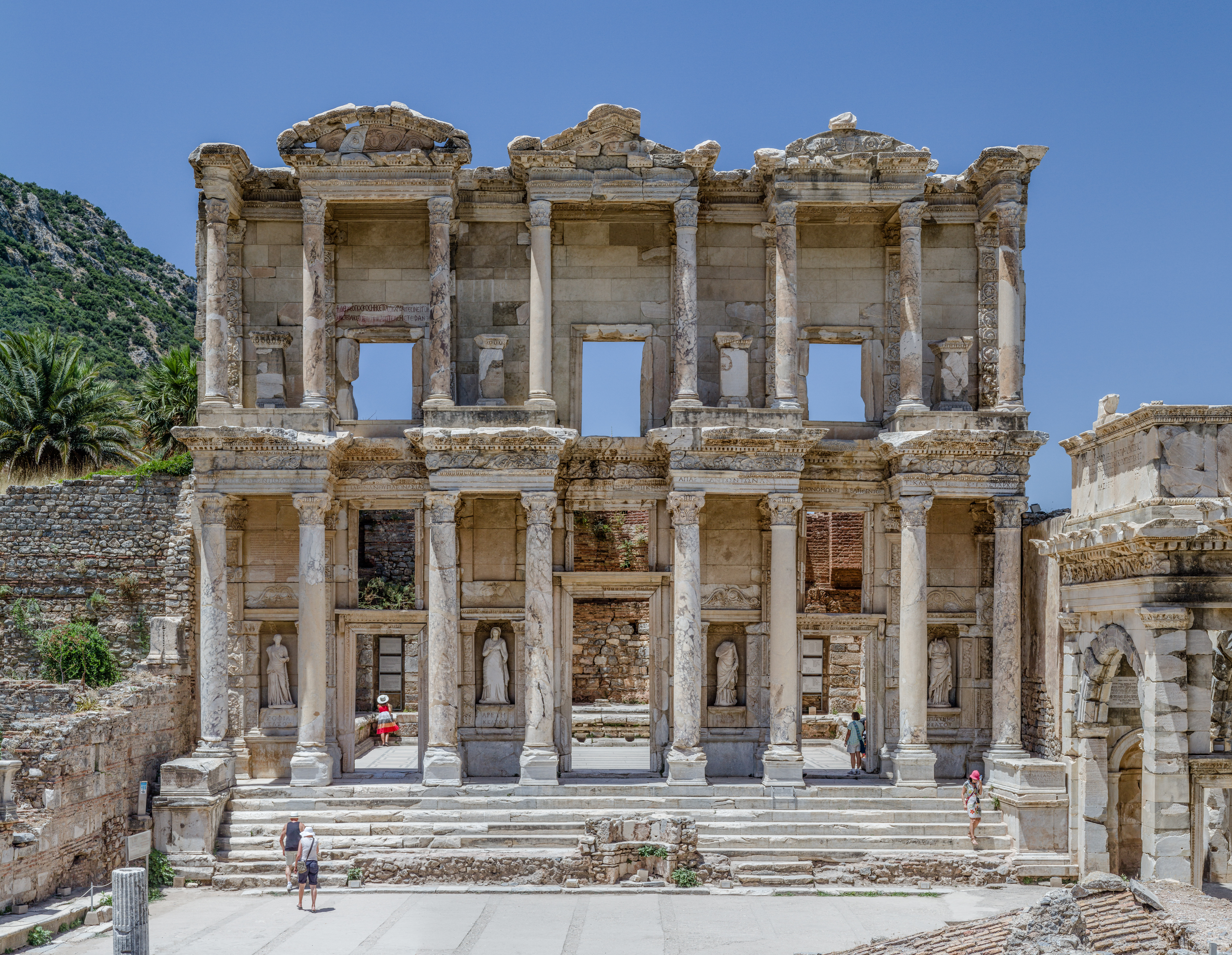
The Library of Celsus in Ephesus was built by the Romans in 114–117.

Cyrus attacked eastern Anatolia in 547 BC, and Achaemenid Empire eventually expanded into western Anatolia. In the east, the Armenian province was part of the Achaemenid Empire. Following the Greco-Persian Wars, the Greek city-states of the Anatolian Aegean coast regained independence, but most of the interior stayed part of the Achaemenid Empire. Two of the Seven Wonders of the Ancient World, the Temple of Artemis in Ephesus, and the Mausoleum of Halicarnassus, were located in Anatolia.

Following the victories of Alexander in 334 BC and 333 BC, the Achaemenid Empire collapsed. This led to increasing cultural homogeneity and Hellenization of Anatolia, which met resistance in some places. Following Alexander's death, the Seleucids ruled large parts of Anatolia, while native Anatolian states emerged in the Marmara and Black Sea areas. In eastern Anatolia, the kingdom of Armenia appeared. In third century BC, Celts invaded central Anatolia and continued as a major ethnic group in the area for around 200 years. They were known as the Galatians.

=== Rome and Byzantine Empire ===
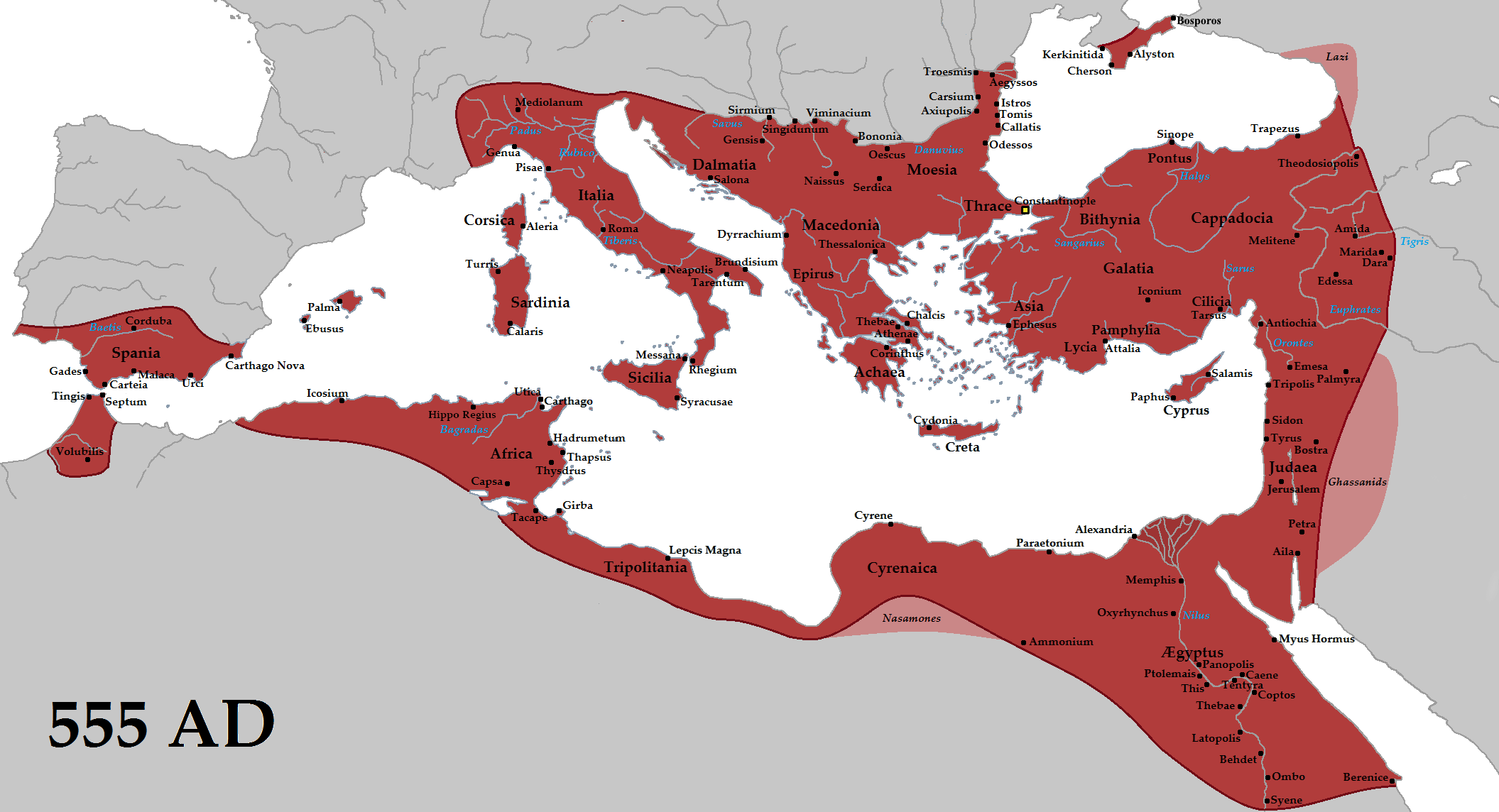
The Eastern Roman (Byzantine) Empire in 555 under Justinian the Great, at its greatest extent

When Pergamon requested assistance in its conflict with the Seleucids, Rome intervened in Anatolia in the second century BC. Without an heir, Pergamum's king left the kingdom to Rome, which was annexed as province of Asia. Roman influence grew in Anatolia afterwards. Following Asiatic Vespers massacre, and Mithridatic Wars with Pontus, Rome emerged victorious. Around the 1st century BC, Rome expanded into parts of Pontus and Bithynia, while turning rest of Anatolian states into Roman satellites. Several conflicts with Parthians ensued, with peace and wars alternating.

According to Acts of the Apostles, early Christian Church had significant growth in Anatolia because of St Paul's efforts. Letters from St. Paul in Anatolia comprise the oldest Christian literature. Under Roman authority, ecumenical councils such as Council of Nicaea (Iznik) in 325 served as a guide for developing "orthodox expressions of basic Christian teachings".

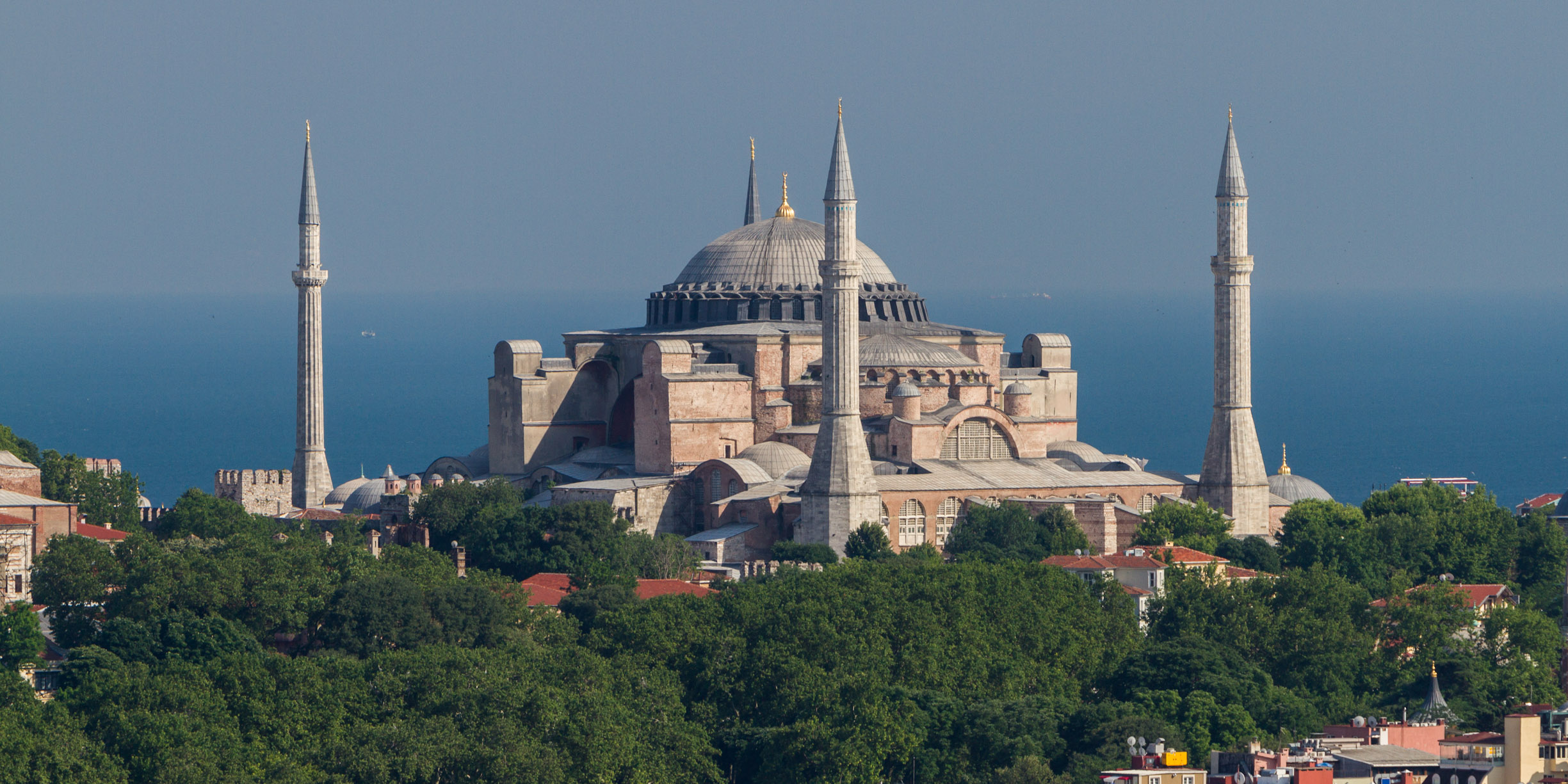
The Hagia Sophia in Constantinople (now Istanbul) was built by the Eastern Roman emperor Justinian the Great in 532–537.

The Byzantine Empire, also referred to as the Eastern Roman Empire, was the continuation of the Roman Empire centered in Constantinople during Late Antiquity and the Middle Ages. The eastern half of the Empire survived the conditions that caused the fall of the West in the 5th century AD, and continued to exist until the fall of Constantinople to the Ottoman Empire in 1453. During most of its existence, the empire remained the most powerful economic, cultural, and military force in the Mediterranean world. The term Byzantine Empire was only coined following the empire's demise; its citizens referred to the polity as the "Roman Empire" and to themselves as Romans. Due to the imperial seat's move from Rome to Byzantium, the adoption of Christianity as the state religion, and the predominance of Greek instead of Latin, modern historians continue to make a distinction between the earlier Roman Empire and the later Byzantine Empire.

In the early Byzantine Empire period, the Anatolian coastal areas were Greek speaking. In addition to natives, interior Anatolia had diverse groups such as Goths, Celts, Persians and Jews. Interior Anatolia had been "heavily Hellenized". Anatolian languages eventually became extinct after Hellenization of Anatolia.

=== Seljuks and Anatolian beyliks ===
According to historians and linguists, the Proto-Turkic language originated in Central-East Asia. Initially, Proto-Turkic speakers were potentially both hunter-gatherers and farmers; they later became nomadic pastoralists. Early and medieval Turkic groups exhibited a wide range of both East Asian and West Eurasian physical appearances and genetic origins, in part through long-term contact with neighboring peoples such as Iranic, Mongolic, Tocharian, Uralic, and Yeniseian peoples. During the 9th and 10th centuries CE, the Oghuz were a Turkic group that lived in the Caspian and Aral steppes. Partly due to pressure from the Kipchaks, the Oghuz migrated into Iran and Transoxiana. They mixed with Iranic-speaking groups in the area and converted to Islam. Oghuz Turks were also known as Turkmen or Turkoman.

A map of independent Turkish principalities in Anatolia during the 14th century

The ruling family of the Seljuks originated from the Kınık branch of the Oghuz Turks. In 1040, the Seljuks defeated the Ghaznavids at the Battle of Dandanaqan and established the Seljuk Empire in Greater Khorasan. Baghdad, the Abbasid Caliphate's capital and center of the Islamic world, was taken by Seljuks in 1055. Given the role Khurasani traditions played in art, culture, and political traditions in the empire, the Seljuk period is described as a mixture of "Turkish, Persian and Islamic influences". In the latter half of the 11th century, the Seljuk Turks began penetrating into medieval Armenia and Anatolia. At the time, Anatolia was a diverse and largely Greek-speaking region after previously being Hellenized.

The Seljuk Turks defeated the Byzantines at the Battle of Manzikert in 1071, and later established the Seljuk Sultanate of Rum. During this period, there were also Turkish principalities such as Danishmendids. Seljuk arrival started the Turkification process in Anatolia; there were Turkic/Turkish migrations, intermarriages, and conversions into Islam. The shift took several centuries and happened gradually. Members of Islamic mysticism orders, such as Mevlevi Order, played a role in the Islamization of the diverse people of Anatolia. Seljuk expansion was one of the reasons for the Crusades. In 13th century, there was a second significant wave of Turkic migration, as people fled Mongol expansion. Seljuk sultanate was defeated by the Mongols at the Battle of Köse Dağ in 1243 and disappeared by the beginning of the 14th century. It was replaced by various Turkish principalities.

=== Ottoman Empire ===
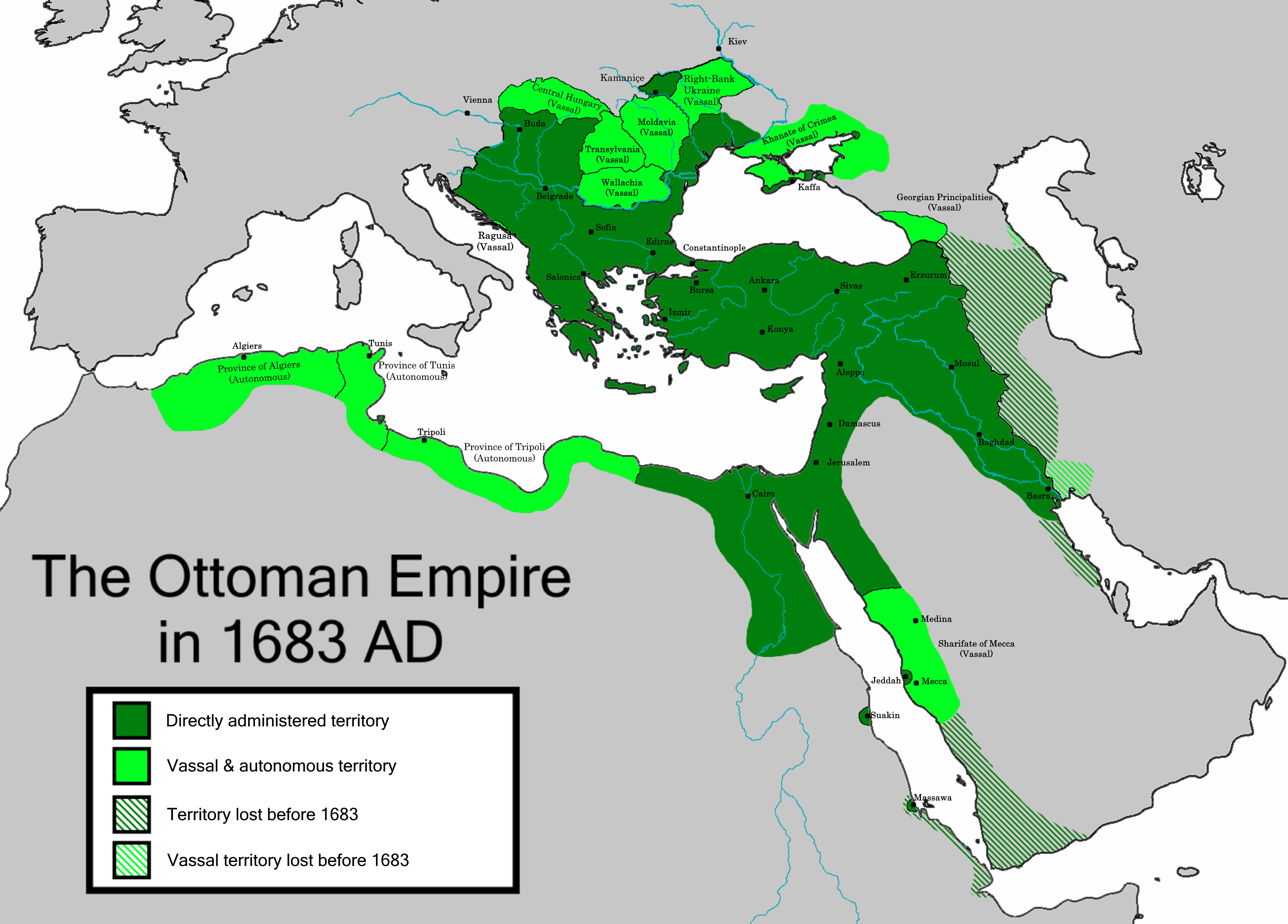
The Ottoman Empire at its greatest European extent, in 1683, during the Battle of Vienna

Based around Söğüt, Ottoman Beylik was founded by Osman I in the early 14th century. According to Ottoman chroniclers, Osman descended from the Kayı tribe of the Oghuz Turks. Ottomans started annexing the nearby Turkish beyliks (principalities) in Anatolia and expanded into the Balkans. Mehmed II completed Ottoman conquest of the Byzantine Empire by capturing its capital, Constantinople, on 29 May 1453. Selim I united Anatolia under Ottoman rule. Turkification continued as Ottomans mixed with various indigenous people in Anatolia and the Balkans.

The Ottoman Empire was a global power during the reigns of Selim I and Suleiman the Magnificent. In the 16th and 17th centuries, Sephardic Jews moved into Ottoman Empire following their expulsion from Spain. From the second half of the 18th century onwards, the Ottoman Empire began to decline. The Tanzimat reforms, initiated by Mahmud II in 1839, aimed to modernize the Ottoman state in line with the progress that had been made in Western Europe. The Ottoman constitution of 1876 was the first among Muslim states, but was short-lived.

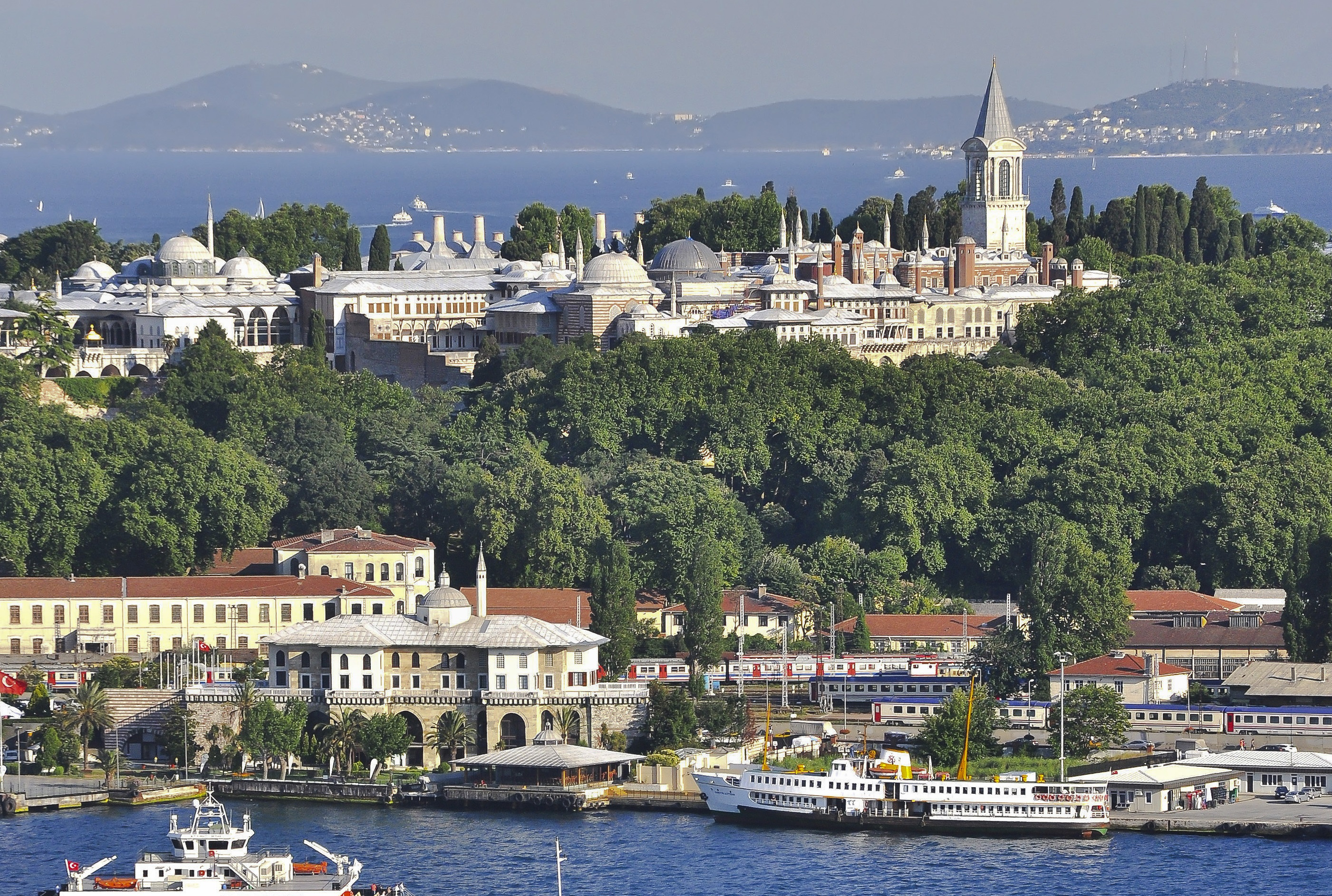

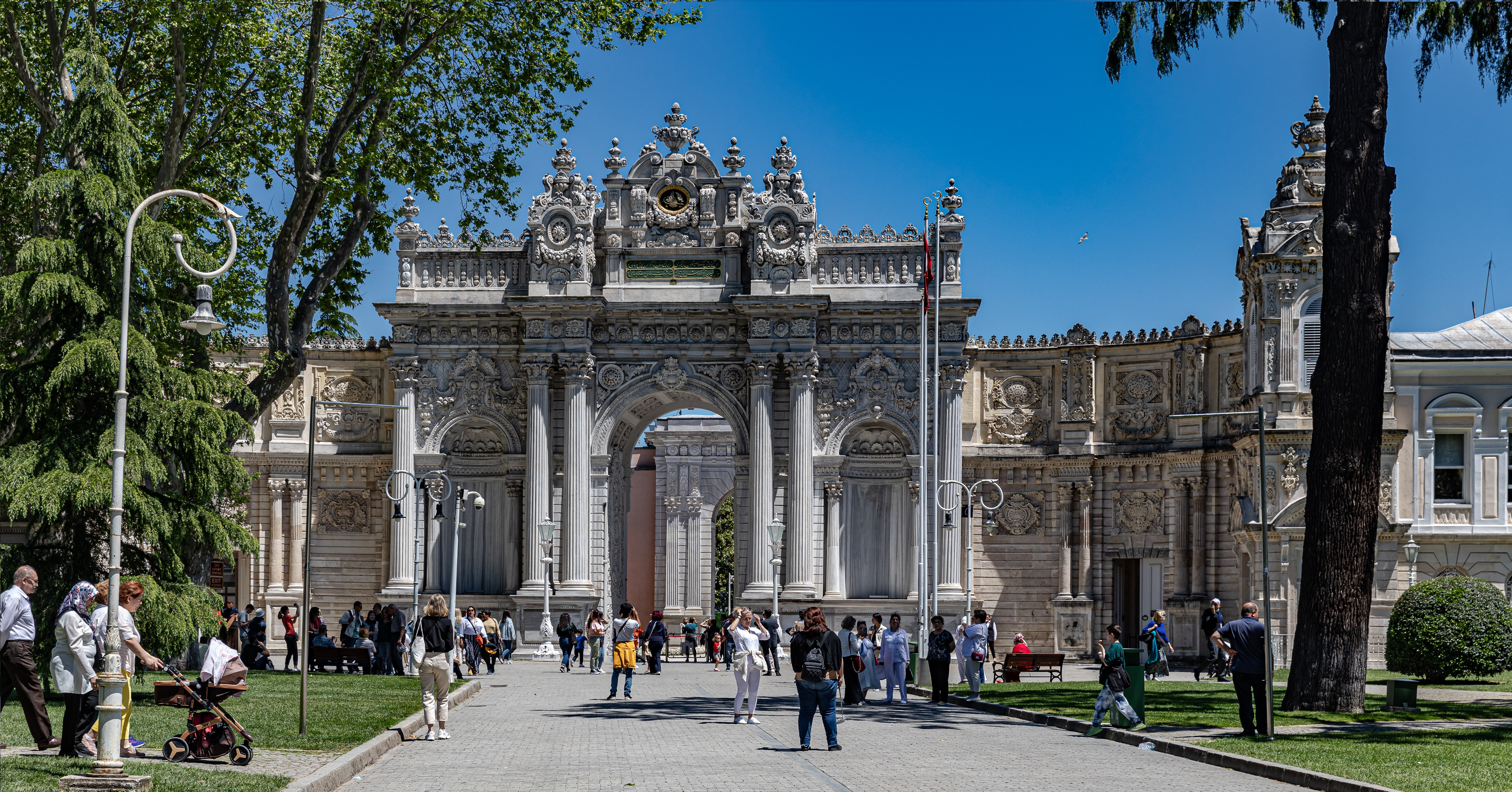
Topkapı Palace and Dolmabahçe Palace were the primary residences of the Ottoman sultans in Istanbul between 1465 and 1856 and 1856 to 1922, respectively.

As the empire gradually shrank in size, military power and wealth; especially after the Ottoman economic crisis and default in 1875 which led to uprisings in the Balkan provinces that culminated in the Russo-Turkish War (1877–1878). The decline of the Ottoman Empire led to a rise in nationalist sentiment among its various subject peoples, leading to increased ethnic tensions which occasionally burst into violence, such as the Hamidian massacres of Armenians, which claimed up to 300,000 lives. Ottoman territories in Europe (Rumelia) were lost in the First Balkan War (1912–1913). Ottomans managed to recover some territory in Europe, such as Edirne, in the Second Balkan War (1913).

In the 19th and early 20th centuries, persecution of Muslims during the Ottoman contraction and in the Russian Empire resulted in estimated 5 million deaths, with the casualties including Turks. Five to seven or seven to nine million refugees migrated into modern-day Turkey from the Balkans, Caucasus, Crimea, and Mediterranean islands, shifting the center of the Ottoman Empire to Anatolia. In addition to a small number of Jews, the refugees were overwhelmingly Muslim; they were both Turkish and non-Turkish people, such as Circassians and Crimean Tatars. Paul Mojzes has called the Balkan Wars an "unrecognized genocide", where multiple sides were both victims and perpetrators. Circassian refugees included the survivors of the Circassian genocide.

Following the 1913 coup d'état, the Three Pashas took control of the Ottoman government. The Ottoman Empire entered World War I on the side of the Central Powers and was ultimately defeated. During the war, the empire's Armenian subjects were deported to Syria as part of the Armenian genocide. As a result, an estimated 600,000 to more than 1 million, or up to 1.5 million Armenians were killed. The Turkish government has refused to acknowledge the events as genocide and states that Armenians were only "relocated" from the eastern war zone. Genocidal campaigns were also committed against the empire's other minority groups such as the Assyrians and Greeks. Following the Armistice of Mudros in 1918, the victorious Allied Powers sought the partition of the Ottoman Empire through the 1920 Treaty of Sèvres.

=== Turkish Republic ===
Mustafa Kemal Atatürk, the founder and the first president of the Turkish Republic

The occupation of Istanbul (1918) and İzmir (1919) by the Allies in the aftermath of World War I initiated the Turkish National Movement. Under the leadership of Mustafa Kemal Pasha, a military commander who had distinguished himself during the Battle of Gallipoli, the Turkish War of Independence (1919–1923) was waged with the aim of revoking the terms of the Treaty of Sèvres (1920).

The Turkish Provisional Government in Ankara, which had declared itself the legitimate government of the country on 23 April 1920, started to formalize the legal transition from the old Ottoman into the new Republican political system. The Ankara Government engaged in armed and diplomatic struggle. In 1921–1923, the Armenian, Greek, French, and British armies had been expelled. The military advance and diplomatic success of the Ankara Government resulted in the signing of the Armistice of Mudanya on 11 October 1922. On 1 November 1922, the Turkish Parliament in Ankara formally abolished the Sultanate, thus ending 623 years of monarchical Ottoman rule.

The Treaty of Lausanne of 24 July 1923, which superseded the Treaty of Sèvres, led to the international recognition of the sovereignty of the Turkish state as the successor state of the Ottoman Empire. On 4 October 1923, the Allied occupation of Turkey ended with the withdrawal of the last Allied troops from Istanbul. The Turkish Republic was officially proclaimed on 29 October 1923 in Ankara, the country's new capital. The Lausanne Convention stipulated a population exchange between Greece and Turkey.

Mustafa Kemal became the republic's first president and introduced many reforms. The reforms aimed to transform the old religion-based and multi-communal Ottoman monarchy into a Turkish nation state that would be governed as a parliamentary republic under a secular constitution. Women gained the right to vote nationally in 1934. With the Surname Law, the Turkish Parliament bestowed upon Kemal the honorific surname "Atatürk" (Father Turk). Atatürk's reforms caused discontent in some Kurdish and Zaza tribes leading to the Sheikh Said rebellion in 1925 and the Dersim rebellion in 1937.

İsmet İnönü became the country's second president following Atatürk's death in 1938. In 1939, the Republic of Hatay voted in favor of joining Turkey with a referendum. Turkey remained neutral during almost all of World War II, but entered the war on the side of the Allies on 23 February 1945. Later that year, Turkey became a charter member of the United Nations. In 1950 Turkey became a member of the Council of Europe. After fighting as part of the UN forces in the Korean War, Turkey joined NATO in 1952, becoming a bulwark against Soviet expansion into the Mediterranean.

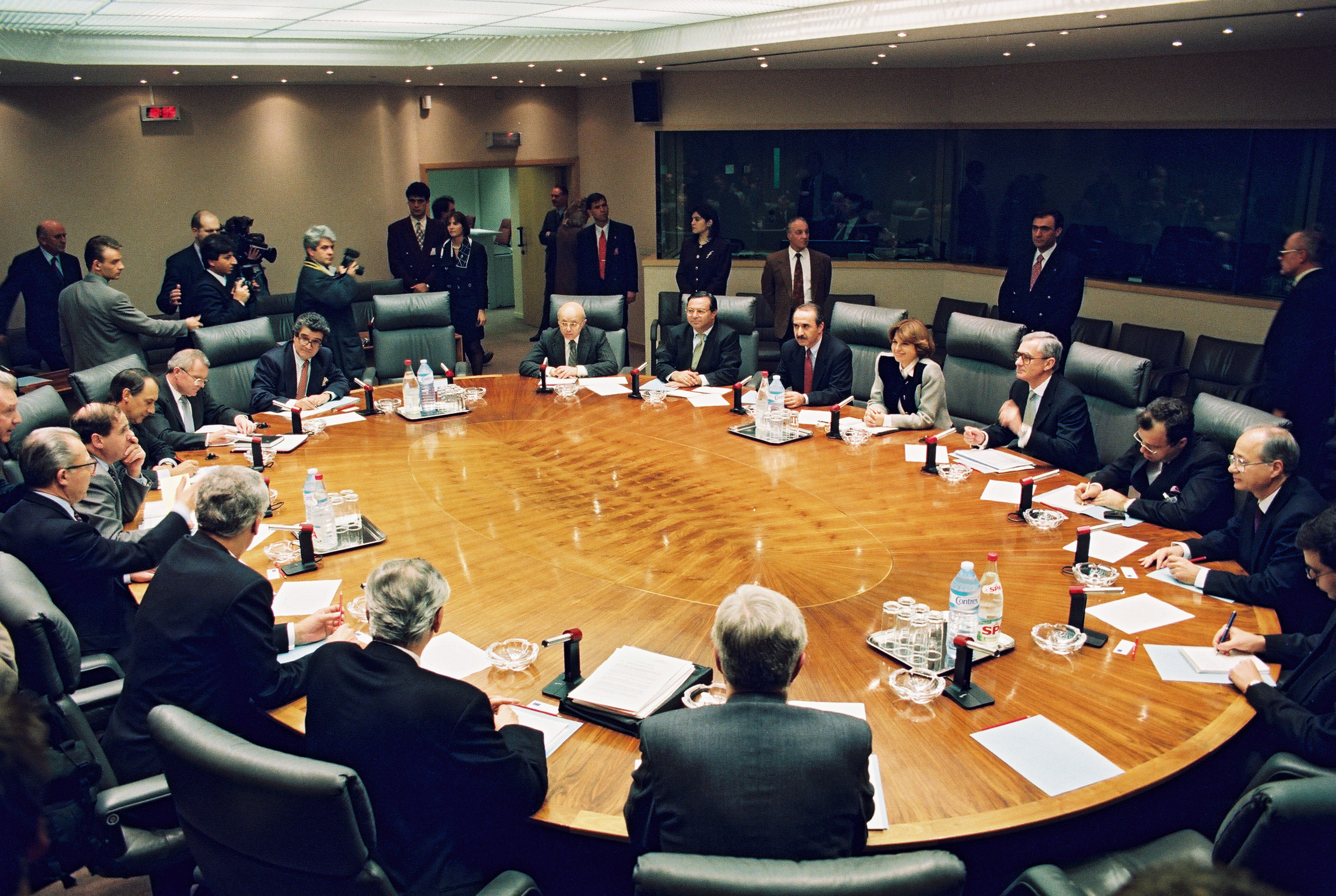
Tansu Çiller, Turkey's first female prime minister, attends a European Commission meeting in January 1994.

Military coups or memorandums, which happened in 1960, 1971, 1980, and 1997, complicated Turkey's transition to a democratic multiparty system. Between 1960 and the end of the 20th century, the prominent leaders in Turkish politics who achieved multiple election victories were Süleyman Demirel, Bülent Ecevit and Turgut Özal. PKK started a "campaign of terrorist attacks on civilian and military targets" in the 1980s. It is designated as a terrorist organization by Turkey, the United States, and the European Union. Tansu Çiller became the first female prime minister of Turkey in 1993. Turkey applied for full membership of the EEC in 1987, joined the European Union Customs Union in 1995 and started accession negotiations with the European Union in 2005. Customs Union had an important impact on the Turkish manufacturing sector.

Since 2002, Turkey has been governed by successive governments led by Recep Tayyip Erdoğan's Justice and Development Party (AKP). The party has faced criticism over issues such as increasing centralization of political authority. One of the most prominent examples of these criticisms was the Gezi Park protests in 2013. The demonstrations emerged in response to plans to demolish Istanbul's Gezi Park and construct a shopping mall on the site, as well as broader environmental concerns, but subsequently expanded to include protests over what demonstrators described as democratic backsliding and increasing government control. More than a dozen people were killed, many as a result of police brutality.

In 2014, prime minister Recep Tayyip Erdoğan won Turkey's first direct presidential election. On 15 July 2016, an unsuccessful coup attempt tried to oust the government. According to the Turkish government, there are 13,251 arrested or convicted people in jail as of 2024, related to the 2016 coup attempt. With a referendum in 2017, the parliamentary republic was replaced by an executive presidential system. The office of the prime minister was abolished, and its powers and duties were transferred to the president. On the referendum day, while the voting was still underway, the Supreme Electoral Council lifted a rule that required each ballot to have an official stamp. The opposition parties claimed that as many as 2.5 million ballots without a stamp were accepted as valid. In 2025 the PKK declared a ceasefire.

In March 2025, the detention and arrest of Istanbul mayor and CHP presidential candidate Ekrem İmamoğlu, along with around 100 other people, was described by the Associated Press as a "dramatic escalation in a crackdown on the opposition and dissenting voices in Turkey." These measures sparked nationwide protests, the largest in Turkey since the 2013 Gezi Park demonstrations, during which 1,879 people were detained. Later, in May 2026, the Ankara appeals court declared the CHP primaries' results as void. The court decision removed CHP chairman Özgür Özel and reinstated former leader Kemal Kılıçdaroğlu on an interim basis, a ruling criticized by Human Rights Watch as a major blow to "rule of law, democracy, and human rights".

== Geography ==
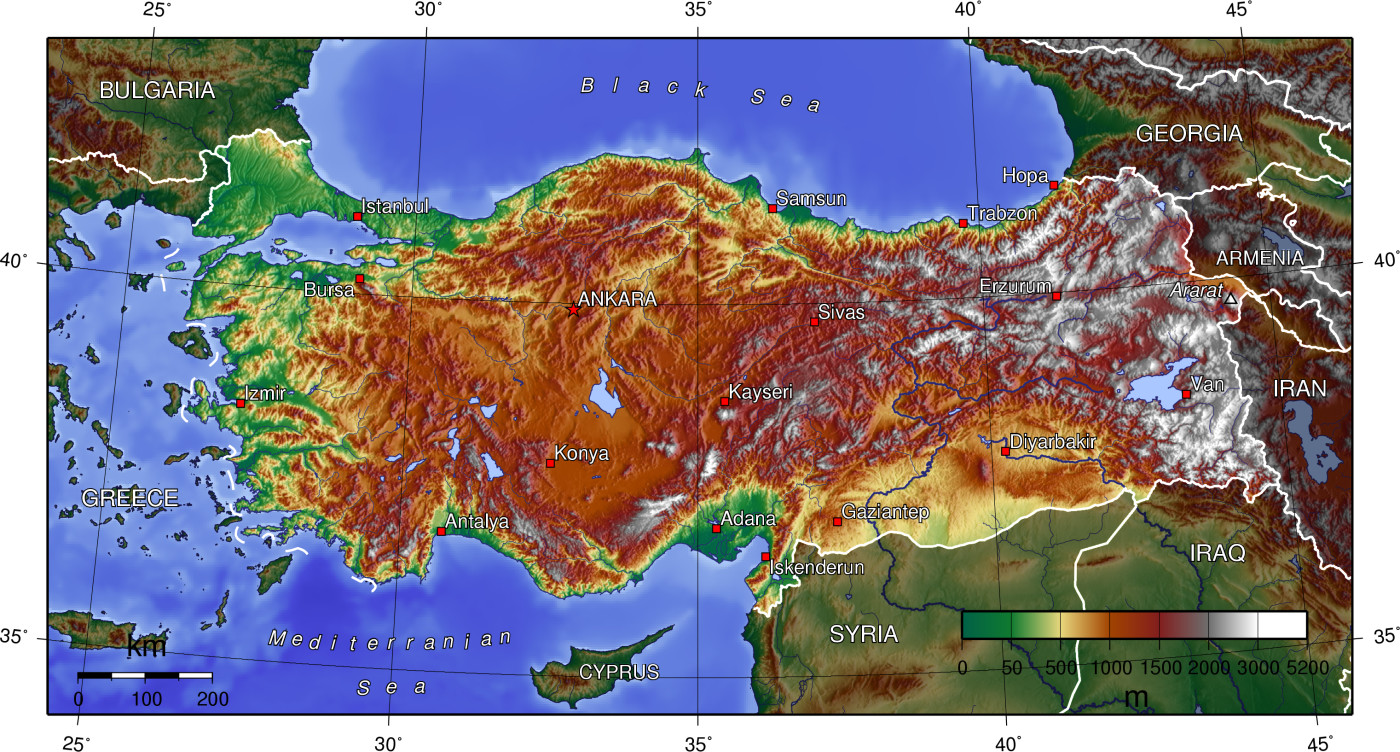
Topographic map of Turkey

Turkey covers an area of 783,562 square kilometres (302,535 square miles). With Turkish straits and Sea of Marmara in between, Turkey bridges Western Asia and Southeastern Europe. Turkey's Asian side covers 97% of its surface, and is often called Anatolia. Another definition of Anatolia's eastern boundary is an imprecise line from the Black Sea to Gulf of Iskenderun. Eastern Thrace, Turkey's European side, includes around 15% of the population and covers 3% of the surface area. The country is encircled by seas on three sides: the Aegean Sea to the west, the Black Sea to the north and the Mediterranean Sea to the south. Turkey is bordered by Georgia, Armenia, Azerbaijan and Iran to the east. To the south, it's bordered by Syria and Iraq. To the north, its Thracian area is bordered by Greece and Bulgaria.

Turkey is divided into "seven major regions": Marmara, Aegean, Central Anatolia, Black Sea, Eastern Anatolia, Southeastern Anatolia and the Mediterranean. As a general trend, the inland Anatolian Plateau becomes increasingly rugged as it progresses eastward. Mountain ranges include Köroğlu and Pontic mountain ranges to the north, and the Taurus Mountains to the south. The Lakes Region contains some of the largest lakes in Turkey such as Lake Beyşehir and Lake Eğirdir.

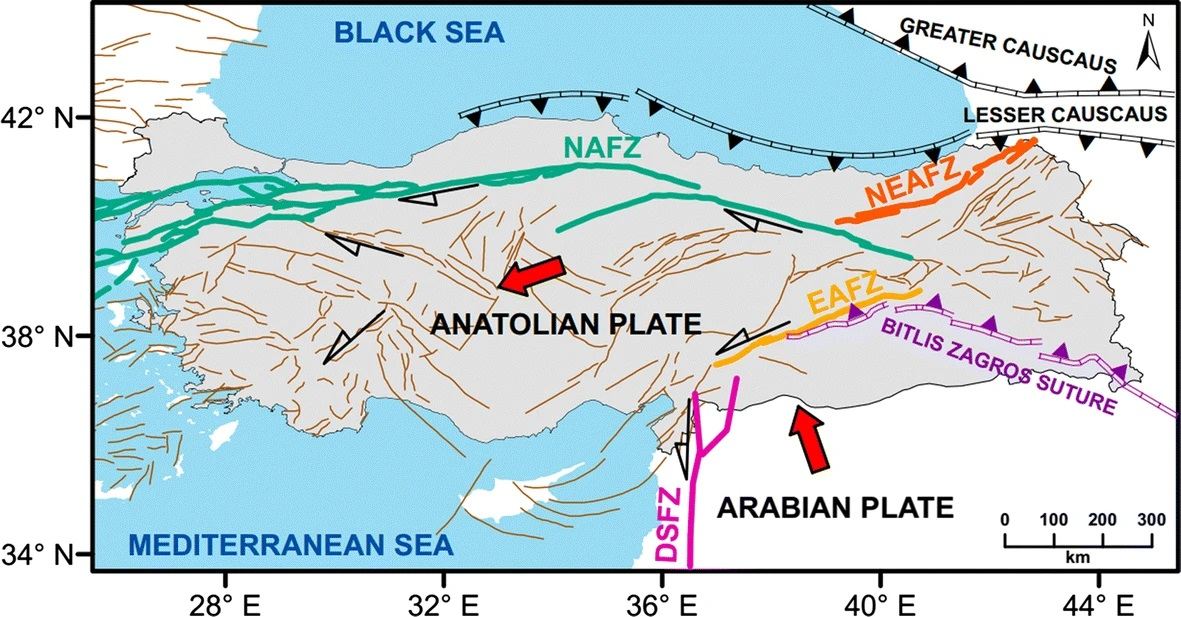
Tectonic map of Turkey. Straight lines and lines with triangles denote different types of faults, such as North Anatolian Fault and East Anatolian Fault.

Geographers have used the eastern Anatolian plateau, Iranian plateau, and Armenian plateau terms to refer to the mountainous area around where Arabian and Eurasian tectonic plates merge. The eastern Anatolian plateau and Armenian plateau definitions largely overlap. The Eastern Anatolia region contains Mount Ararat, Turkey's highest point at 5,137 metres (16,854 feet), and Lake Van, the largest lake in the country. Eastern Turkey is home to the sources of rivers such as the Euphrates, Tigris and Aras. The Southeastern Anatolia Region includes the northern plains of Upper Mesopotamia.

Earthquakes happen frequently in Turkey. Almost the entire population lives in areas with varying seismic risk levels, with around 70% in highest or second-highest seismic areas. Anatolian plate is bordered by North Anatolian Fault zone to the north; East Anatolian Fault zone and Bitlis–Zagros collision zone to the east; Hellenic and Cyprus subduction zones to the south; and Aegean extensional zone to the west. After 1999 İzmit and 1999 Düzce earthquakes, North Anatolian Fault zone activity "is considered to be one of the most dangerous natural hazards in Turkey". 2023 Turkey–Syria earthquakes were the deadliest in contemporary Turkish history. Turkey is sometimes unfavorably compared to Chile, a country with a similar developmental level that is more successful with earthquake preparedness.

=== Biodiversity ===
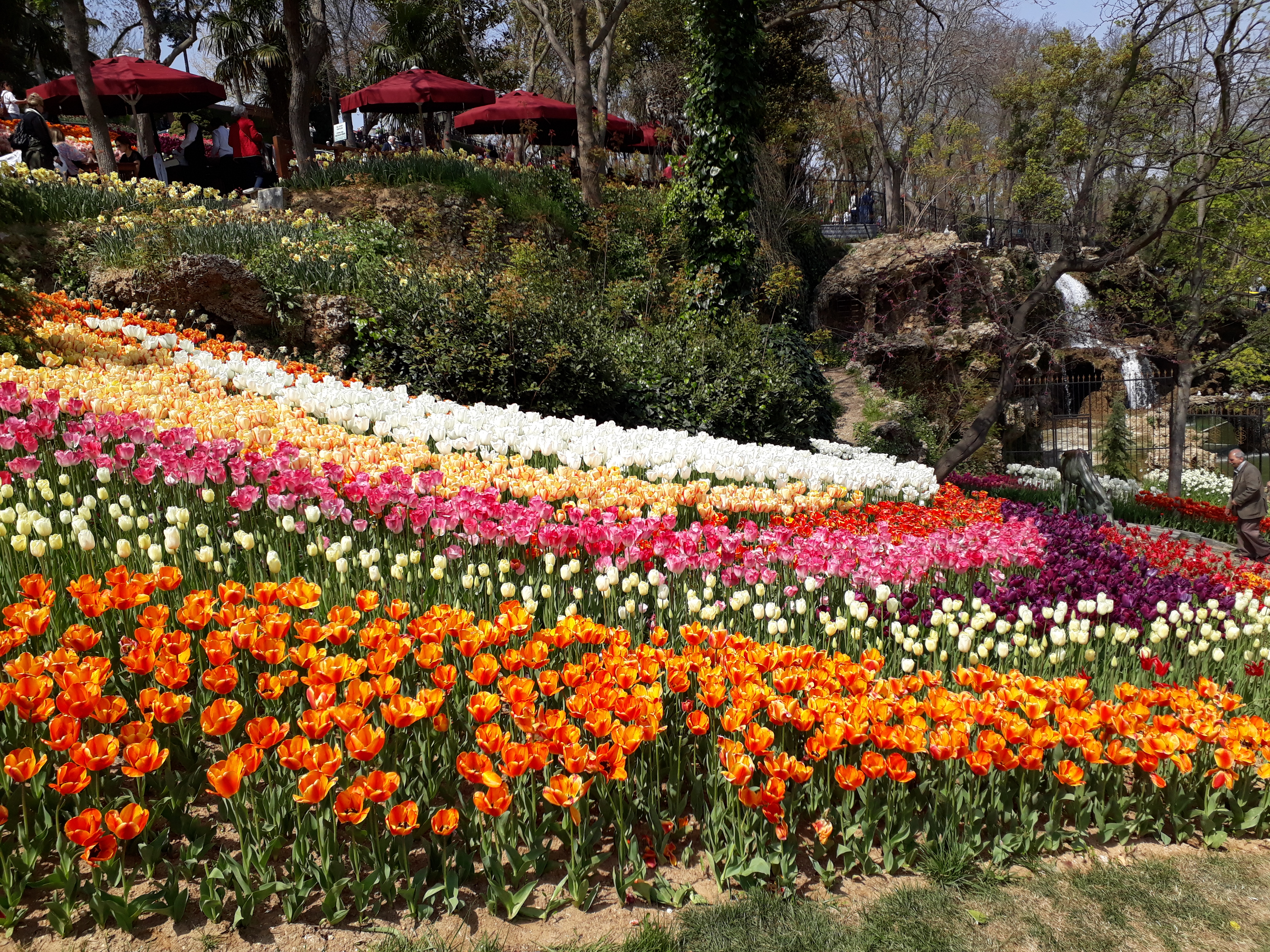
Tulip is a national flower of Turkey. Emirgan Park in Istanbul hosts Tulip Festival each year.

Turkey has rich biodiversity, and includes three biodiversity hotspots out of the 36 in the world. These are the Mediterranean, Irano-Anatolian, and Caucasus hotspots. Central or Eastern Anatolian steppe ecosystems contain wild animal and plant species whose genetic variation have important implications for the food industry, agriculture, and medicine. Other ecosystems in Turkey include Mediterranean plant types, temperate deciduous forest, and Alpine tundra. An extensive number of species of plants and animals exist in Turkey. These include around 197 mammal species, 420 bird species, 820 marine and freshwater fish species, 130 reptile species, and 10,150 vascular plant species. Some of these are endangered or critically endangered. A lot of the animal and plant species are endemic.

Landscapes in Turkey face a variety of threats and risks such as desertification, soil erosion, declining groundwater levels, and salinization of soil. 27% of Turkey is protected, which includes conservation areas, forests, national parks, biosphere reserves, natural monuments, and historical sites. There are 50 national parks; most visited in 2022 were Marmaris National Park and Beydağları Coastal National Park. As of 2020, Turkey's forests covered 29% of Turkey's surface area. Turkey's forests include globally largest concentrations of Cedrus libani and Mediterranean cypress trees, while Turkey's wetlands are significant for migratory birds.

=== Climate ===
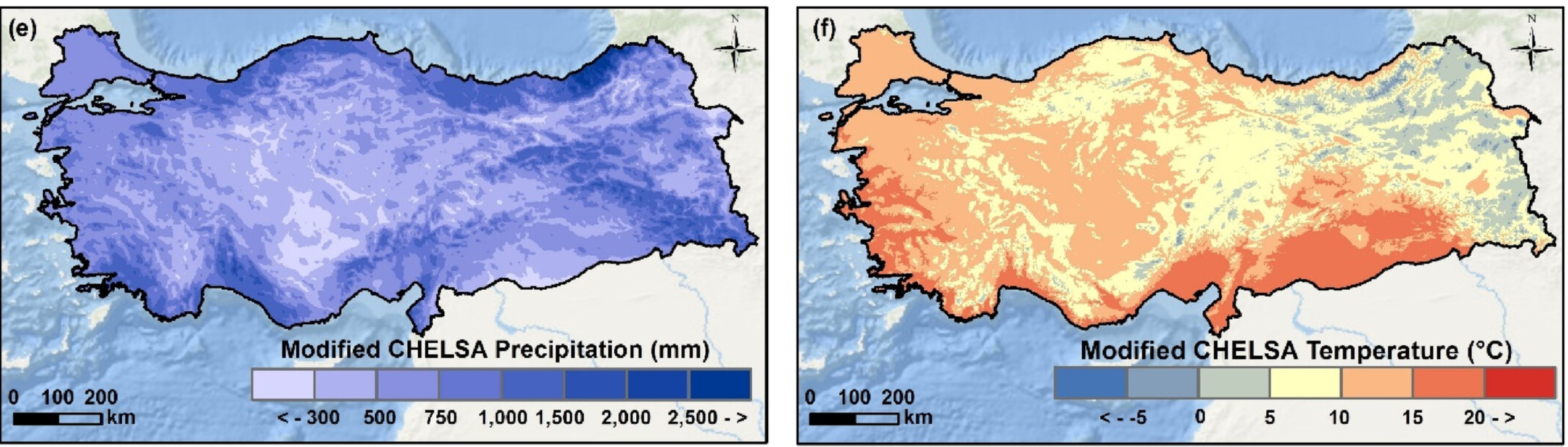
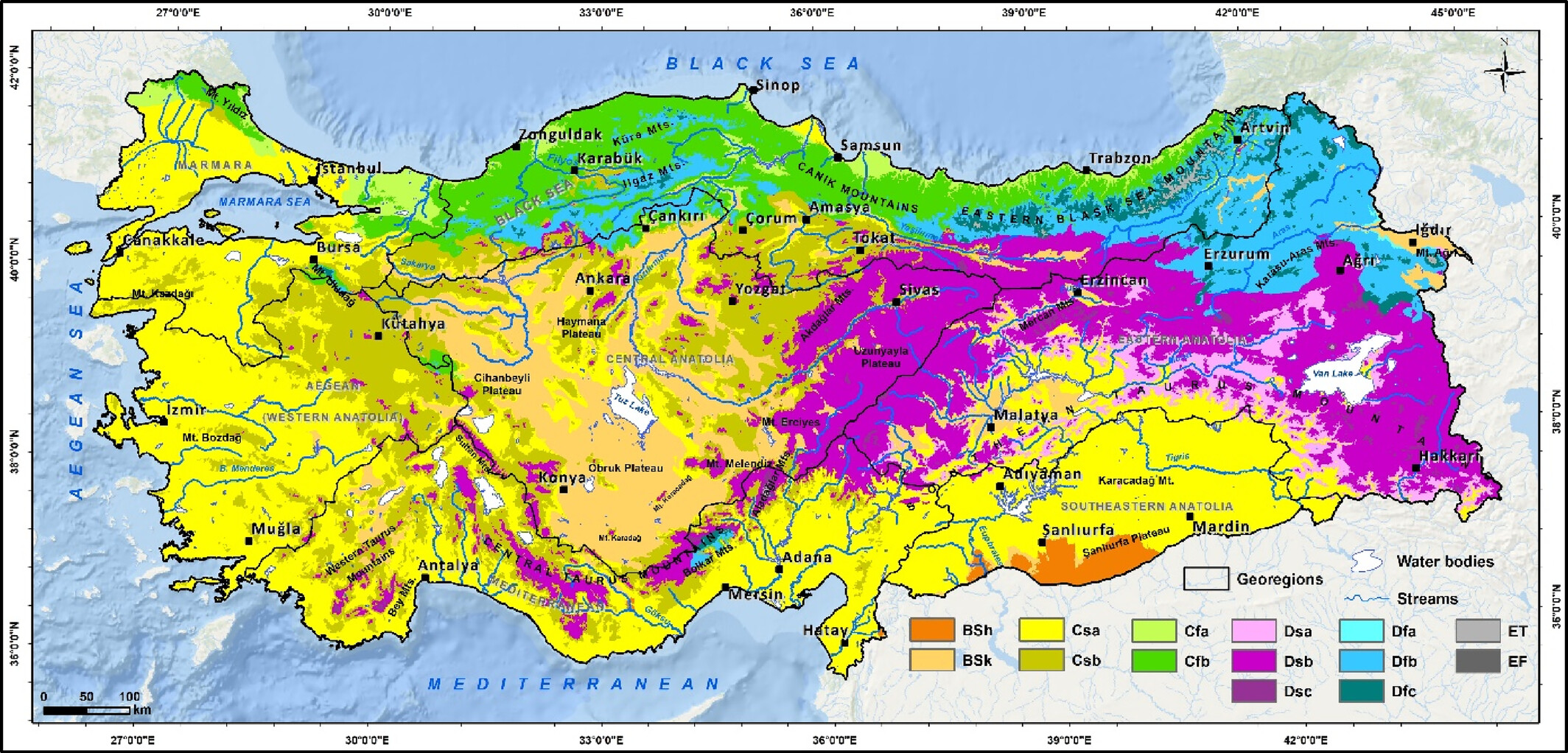
Clockwise from top left image: yearly total precipitation, yearly average temperatures, and Köppen climate types in Turkey

Turkey's climate is highly varied due to rising overall elevation eastwards and the mountains that run alongside the coasts. Warm summers, "cool to cold" winters, and year-round wet conditions are found in the northern coasts. Rainless and hot summers, and wet, cool to mild winters describe the western and southern coasts of the country. Inland areas feature more severe winters, sharper temperature swings, and relatively low precipitation.

According to the Köppen climate classification, Turkey has 14 distinct climate zones. The Mediterranean climate is found in the Mediterranean, Aegean, Marmara, and Southeastern Anatolia regions of the country. In the Black Sea area, humid subtropical and oceanic climate types are usually found. Large swaths of Central and Eastern Anatolia are classified into semi-arid or continental climate types.

Turkey is highly vulnerable to climate change, due to socioeconomic, climatic, and geographic factors. This applies to nine out of ten climate vulnerability dimensions, such as "average annual risk to wellbeing". OECD median is two out of ten. Inclusive and swift growth is needed for decreasing vulnerability. Turkey aims to achieve net zero emissions by 2053. Accomplishing climate goals would require large investments, but would benefit the economy due to less illness and death from Turkey's air pollution, and less fuel imports.

== Government and politics ==
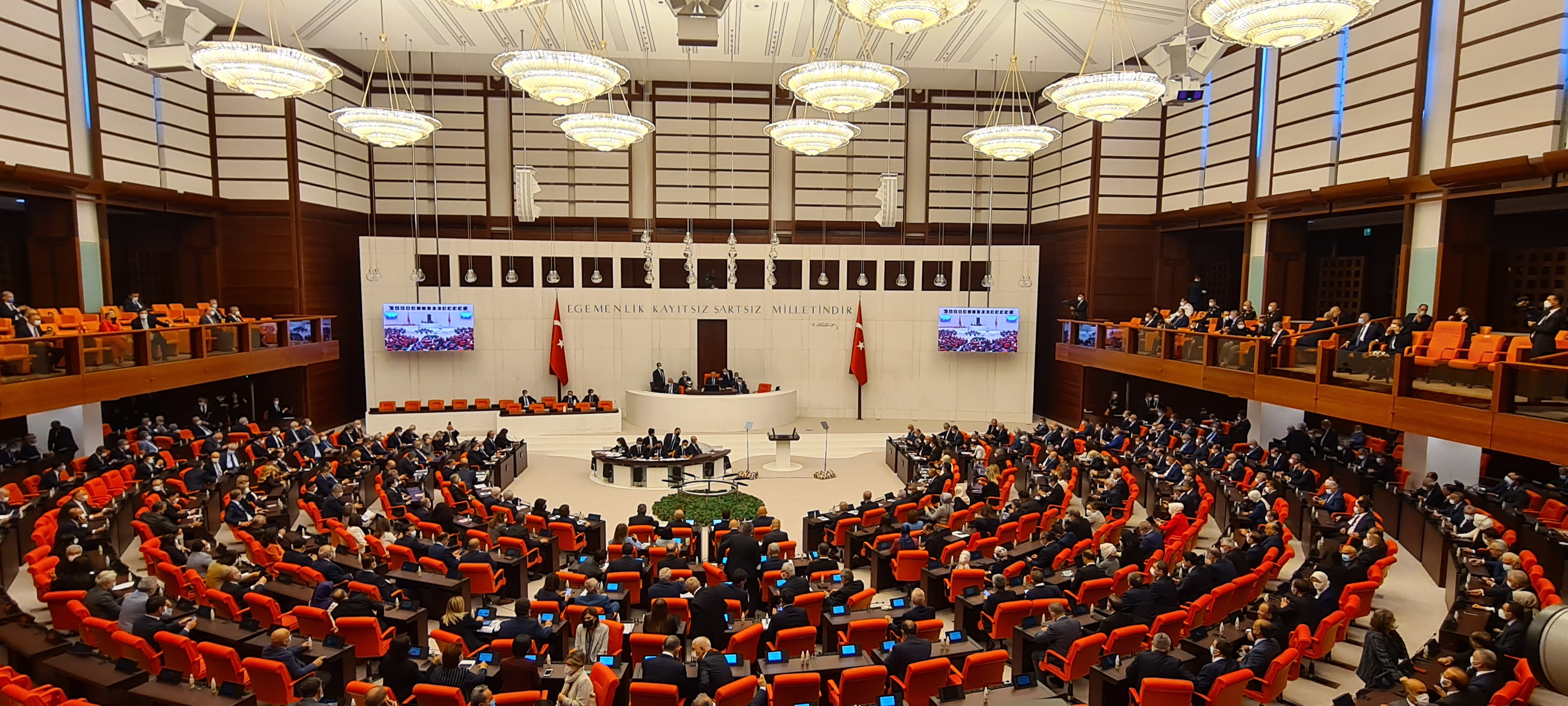
The Grand National Assembly,
the legislative chamber in Ankara

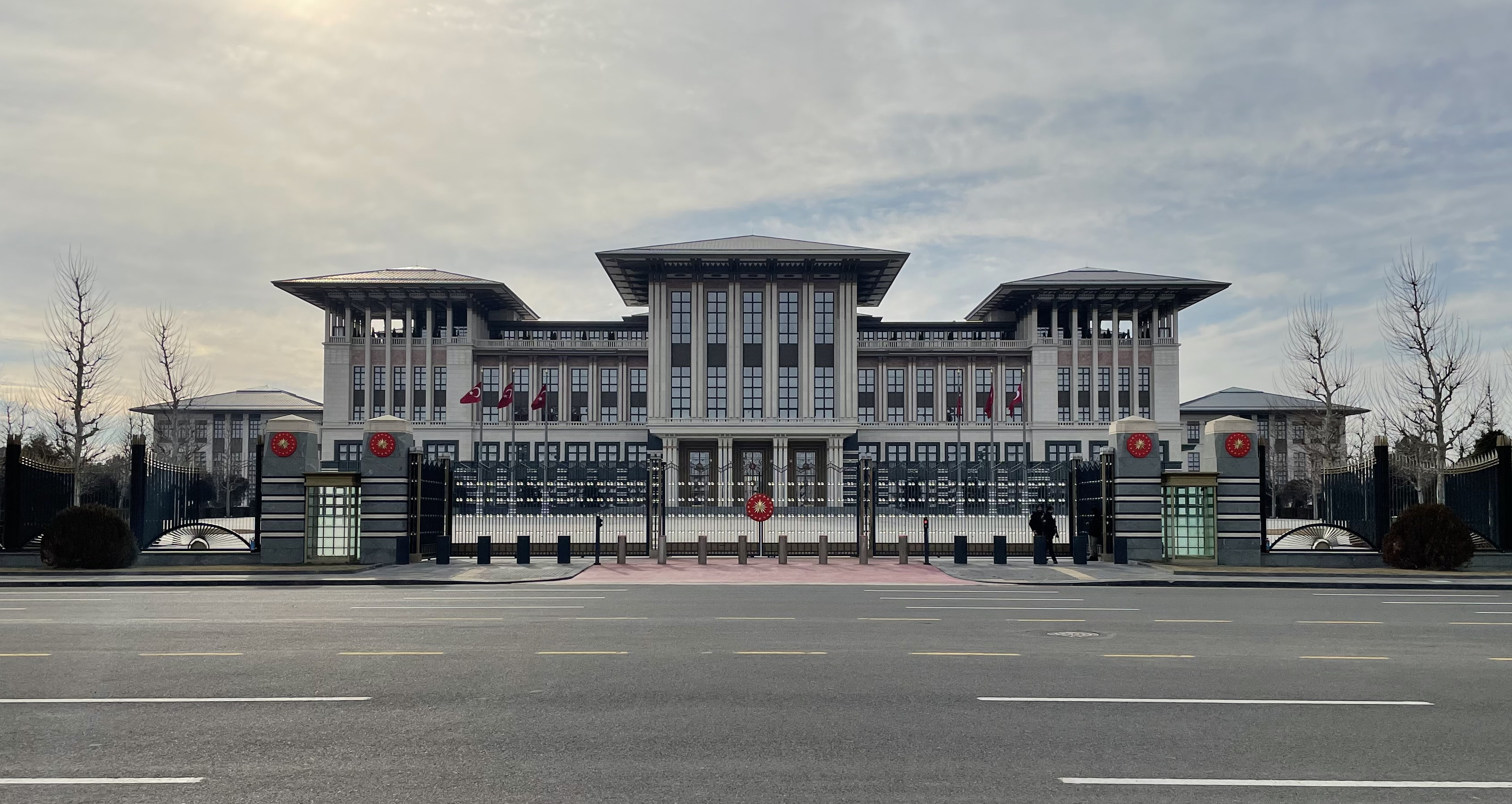
The Presidential Complex, residence and workplace of the President of Turkey

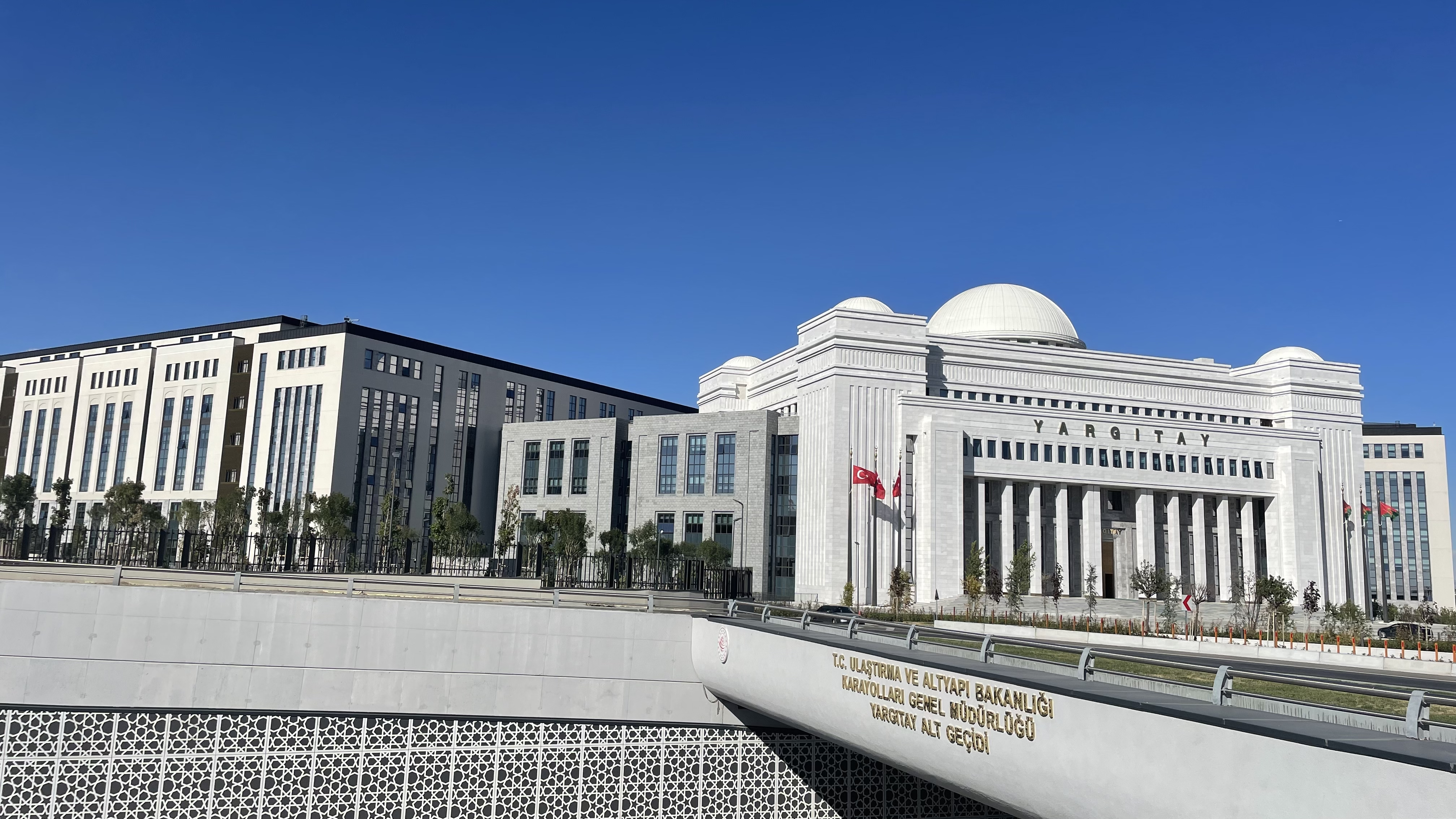
The Court of Cassation is Turkey's supreme court for reviewing verdicts given by courts of criminal and civil justice.

Turkey is a presidential republic within a multi-party system. Due to Erdoğan's judicial capture, imprisonment of opposition politicians and dissidents, and repression of protest movements, Turkey is not considered a democracy but rather as a competitive or fully authoritarian system. The current constitution was approved by referendum in 1982, which determines the government's structure, lays forth the ideals and standards of the state's conduct, and sets out the state's responsibility to its citizens. Furthermore, the constitution specifies the people's rights and obligations, as well as principles for the delegation and exercise of sovereignty that belongs to the people of Turkey.

In the Turkish unitary system, citizens are subject to three levels of government: national, provincial, and local. The local government's duties are commonly split between municipal governments and districts, in which the executive and legislative officials are elected by a plurality vote of citizens by district. Turkey is subdivided into 81 provinces for administrative purposes. Each province is divided into districts, for a total of 973 districts.

=== National government ===
The government, regulated by a system of separation of powers as defined by the constitution of Turkey, comprises three branches:

- Legislative: The unicameral Parliament makes laws, debates and adopts the budget bills, declares war, approves treaties, proclaims amnesty and pardon, and has the power of impeachment, by which it can remove incumbent members of the government. The Parliament has 600 voting members, each representing a constituency for a five-year term. Parliamentary seats are distributed among the provinces by population, conforming with the census apportionment.
- Executive: The president is the commander-in-chief of the military, can veto legislative bills before they become law (subject to parliamentary override), can issue presidential decrees on matters regarding executive power with the exception of fundamental rights, individual rights and certain political rights (parliamentary laws prevail presidential decrees), and appoints the members of the Cabinet and other officers, who administer and enforce national laws and policies. The president is elected by direct vote and serves a five-year term. The president cannot run for re-elections after two terms of five-years, unless the parliament prematurely renews the presidential elections during the second term of the President. Elections for the Parliament and presidential elections are held on the same day.
- Judicial: The Constitutional Court (for constitutional adjudication and review of individual applications concerning human rights), the Court of Cassation (final decision maker in ordinary judiciary), the Council of State (final decision maker in administrative judiciary) and the Court of Jurisdictional Disputes (for resolving the disputes between courts for constitutional jurisdiction) are the four organizations that are described by the Constitution as supreme courts. The Constitutional Court is composed of fifteen judges and are appointed by the president and the parliament. A member is elected for a term of twelve years and cannot be re-elected. The members of the Constitutional Court are obliged to retire when they are over the age of sixty-five.

The three-branch system is known as the presidential system, in contrast to the parliamentary system where the executive is part of the legislative body.

=== Administrative divisions ===
Turkey is a unitary state. Its administrative system includes central and local administration. Central administration consists of the central government in Ankara, and local departments such as 81 provinces and their subdivisions. Local administration authorities consist of metropolitan municipalities, municipalities, neighborhoods or villages, and special provincial administrations. For economic and geographic reasons, Turkey is also categorized into seven regions and 21 sub-regions.

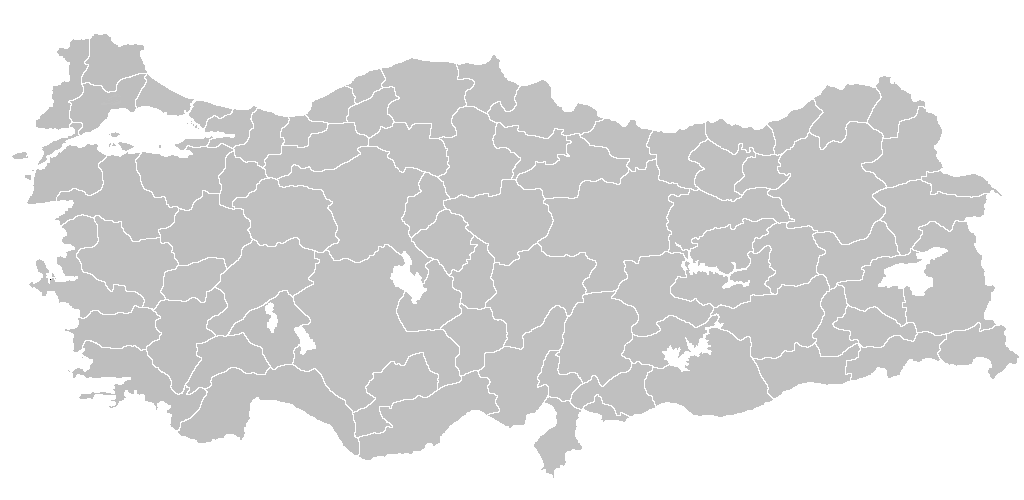

=== Parties and elections ===
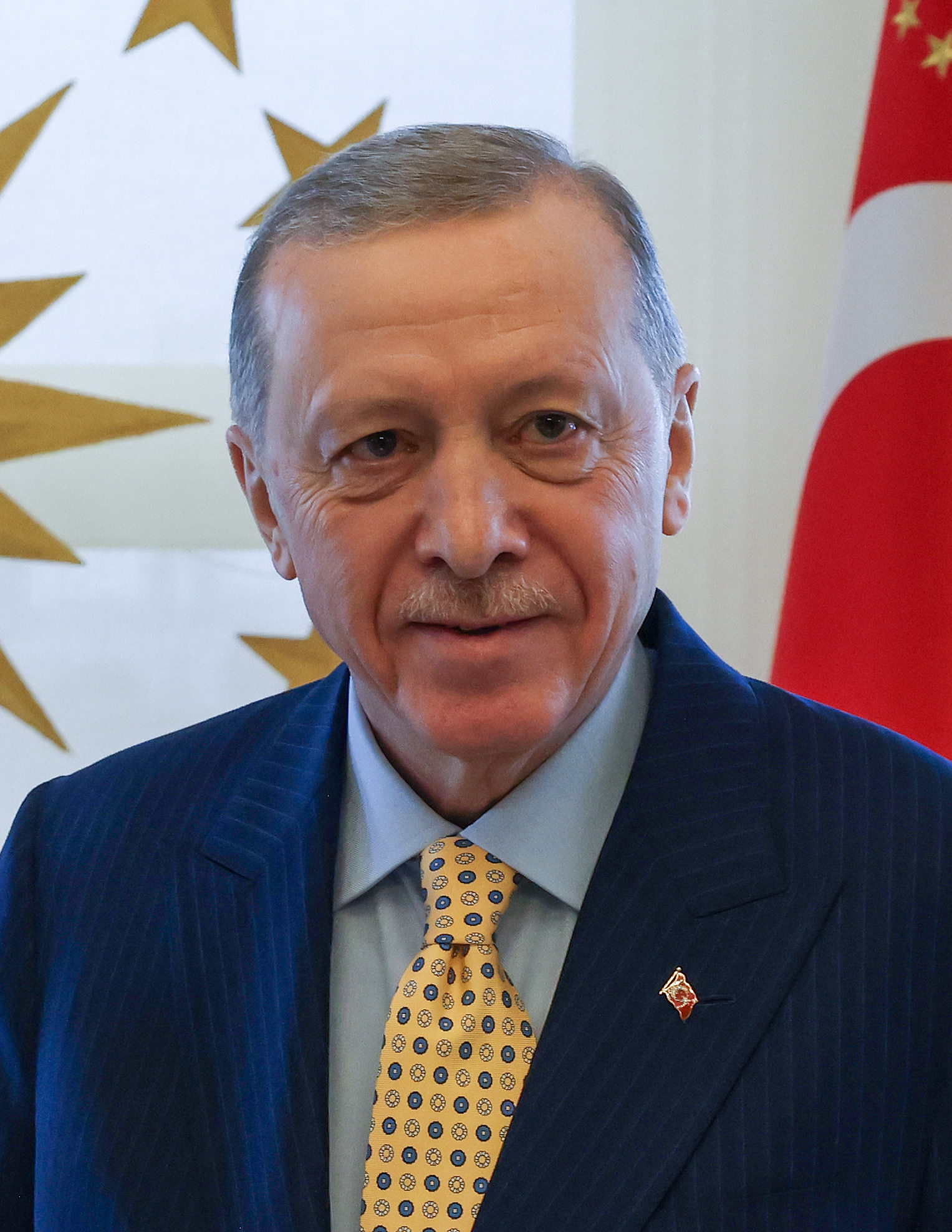
Recep Tayyip Erdoğan
President

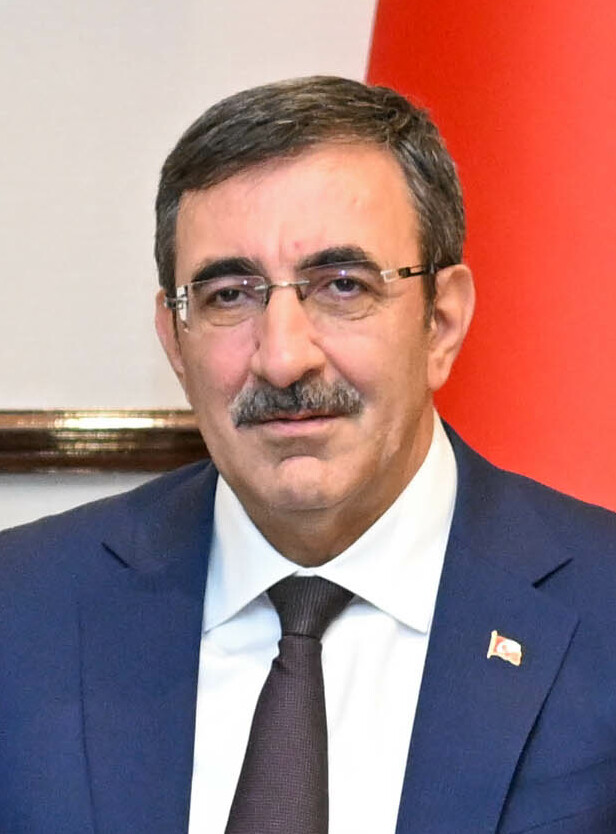
Cevdet Yılmaz
Vice President

Results of the 2024 Turkish local elections

Elections in Turkey are held for six functions of government: presidential (national), parliamentary (national), municipality mayors (local), district mayors (local), provincial or municipal council members (local), and muhtars (local). Referendums are also held occasionally. Every Turkish citizen who has turned 18 has the right to vote and stand as a candidate at elections. Universal suffrage for both sexes has been applied throughout Turkey since 1934. In Turkey, turnout rates of both local and general elections are high compared to many other countries, which usually stands higher than 80%. President Recep Tayyip Erdoğan is currently serving as the head of state and head of government. Özgür Özel is the Main Opposition Leader.

The electoral threshold for political parties at national level is seven percent of the votes. Smaller parties can avoid the electoral threshold by forming an alliance with other parties. Independent candidates are not subject to an electoral threshold.

On the right side of the Turkish political spectrum, parties like the Democrat Party, Justice Party, Motherland Party, and Justice and Development Party became the most popular political parties in Turkey, winning numerous elections. Turkish right-wing parties are more likely to embrace the principles of political ideologies such as conservatism, nationalism or Islamism. On the left side of the spectrum, parties like the Republican People's Party, Social Democratic Populist Party and Democratic Left Party once enjoyed the largest electoral success. Left-wing parties are more likely to embrace the principles of socialism, Kemalism or secularism.

The Constitutional Court can strip the public financing of political parties that it deems anti-secular or having ties to terrorism, or ban their existence altogether. On 20 May 2016, the Turkish parliament stripped almost a quarter of its members of immunity from prosecution, including 101 deputies from the pro-Kurdish HDP and the main opposition CHP party. In its 2023 report, the European Commission criticized how democratic institutions in Turkey operate. The criticism was rejected by Turkey.

=== Law ===
With the founding of the Republic, Turkey adopted a civil law legal system, replacing Sharia-derived Ottoman law. The Civil Code, adopted in 1926, was based on the Swiss Civil Code of 1907 and the Swiss Code of Obligations of 1911. Although it underwent a number of changes in 2002, it retains much of the basis of the original Code. The Criminal Code, originally based on the Italian Criminal Code, was replaced in 2005 by a Code with principles similar to the German Penal Code and German law generally. Administrative law is based on the French equivalent and procedural law generally shows the influence of the Swiss, German and French legal systems. Islamic principles do not play a part in the legal system.

Law enforcement in Turkey is carried out by several agencies under the jurisdiction of the Ministry of Internal Affairs. These agencies are the General Directorate of Security, the Gendarmerie General Command and the Coast Guard Command. In the years of government by the Justice and Development Party and Erdoğan, particularly since 2013, the independence and integrity of the Turkish judiciary has increasingly been said to be in doubt by institutions, parliamentarians and journalists both within and outside of Turkey, because of political interference in the promotion of judges and prosecutors and in their pursuit of public duty.

=== Foreign relations ===
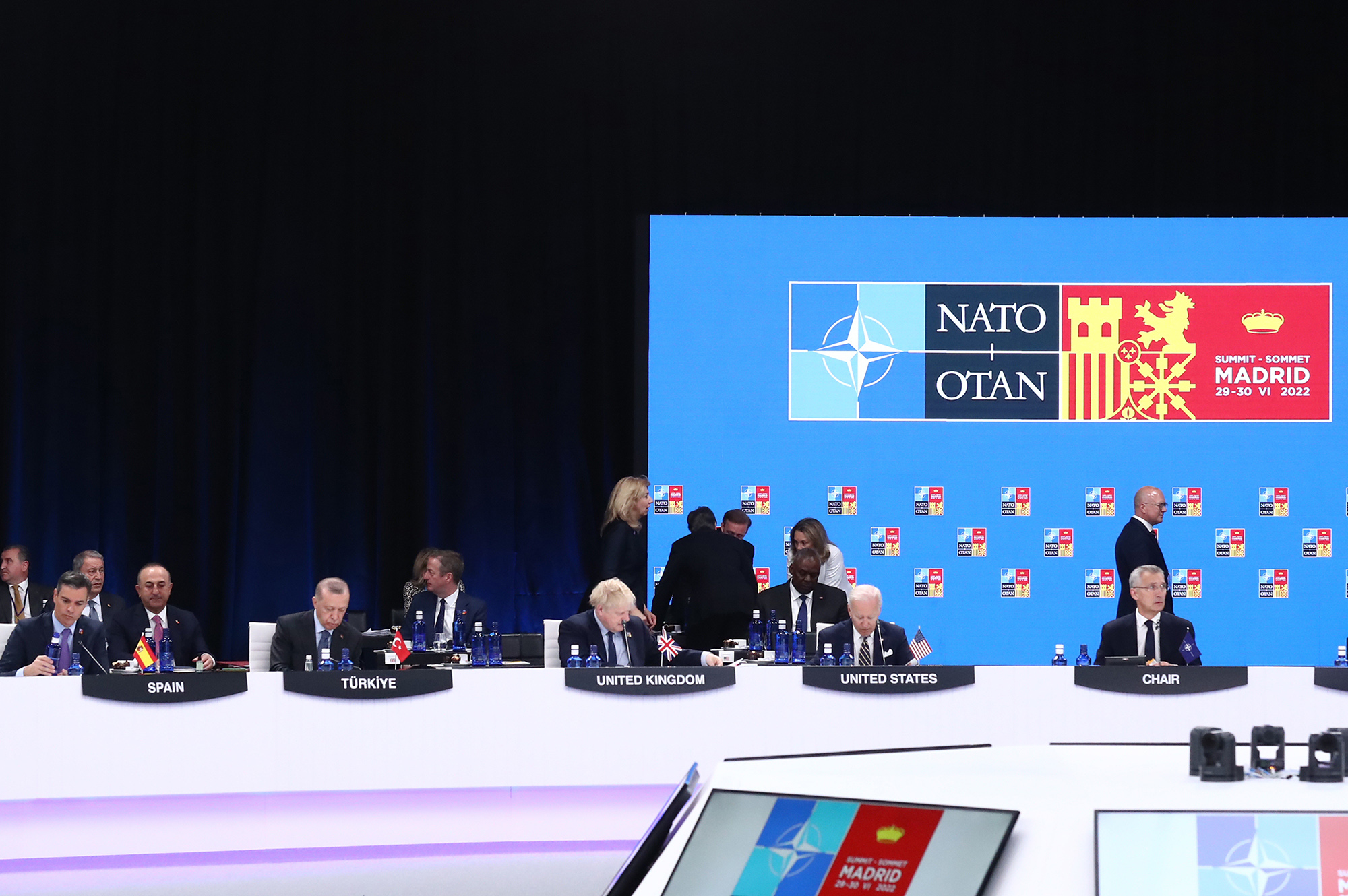
Turkey has been a member of NATO since 1952, has its second largest army and is the host of the Allied Land Command headquarters.

Turkey has been characterized as an emerging, rising, middle, quasi-regional, and a regional power. Turkey's constant foreign policy goal is to pursue its national interests. These interests are mainly growing the economy, and maintaining security from internal terrorist and external threats. After the establishment of the Republic, Atatürk and İnönü followed the "peace at home, peace in the world" principle until the Cold War's start. Following threats from the Soviet Union, Turkey sought to ally with the United States and joined NATO in 1952.

Overall, Turkey aims for good relations with Central Asia, the Caucasus, Russia, the Middle East, and Iran. With the West, Turkey also aims to keep its arrangements. By trading with the east and joining the EU, Turkey pursues economic growth. Turkey joined the European Union Customs Union in 1995, but its EU accession talks are frozen.

Turkey has sought closer relations with the Central Asian Turkic states after the breakup of the Soviet Union. Closer relations with Azerbaijan, a culturally close country, was achieved. Turkey is a founding member of the International Organization of Turkic Culture and Organization of Turkic States. It is also a member of Organization for Security and Cooperation in Europe, Council of Europe, and Organisation of Islamic Cooperation.

Following the Arab Spring, Turkey had problems with countries such as United Arab Emirates, Saudi Arabia, and Egypt. Relations with these countries have improved since then. There are disputes with Greece over maritime boundaries and with Cyprus. In 2018, the Turkish military and the Turkish-backed forces began an operation in Syria aimed at ousting US-backed YPG (which Turkey considers to be an offshoot of the outlawed PKK) from the enclave of Afrin. Turkey has also conducted airstrikes in Iraqi Kurdistan, which was criticized by Iraq for violating its sovereignty and killing civilians. Diplomatic relations with Israel were damaged after the 2010 Gaza flotilla raid, normalized in 2016, and cut again following the Israeli invasion of the Gaza Strip. In 2024, Turkey stopped trading with Israel.

=== Military ===
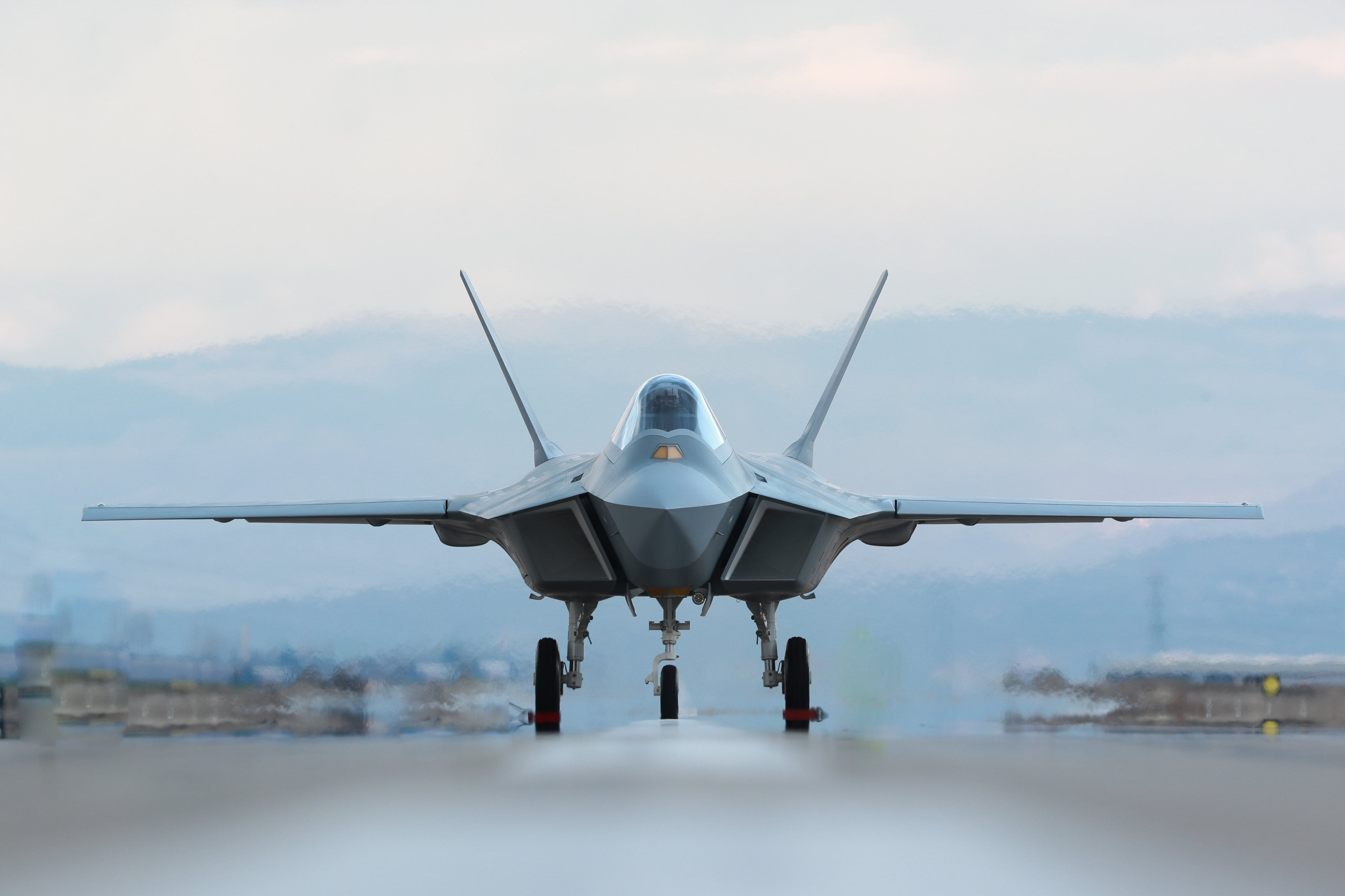
The TAI TF Kaan is currently being developed by Turkish Aerospace Industries for the Turkish Air Force.

The Turkish Armed Forces are responsible for defense against foreign threats. Although the commander-in-chief is the president, the General Staff, Air Force, Naval Force, and Land Force usually report to the Minister of National Defence. The Gendarmerie General Command and the Coast Guard Command are under the jurisdiction of the Ministry of the Interior. Military service is required for 6–12 months for men, which is reduced to one month after paying a fee. Turkey does not recognize conscientious objection and does not offer a civilian alternative to military service.

Turkey has the second-largest military force in NATO, after the United States, with an estimated strength of 890,700 military personnel as of February 2022. Turkey is considered a significant power in unmanned aerial vehicles. As part of the nuclear sharing policy of NATO, Turkey hosts approximately 20 United States B61 nuclear bombs at the Incirlik Air Base. In recent years, Turkey's defense industry has developed rapidly. Aselsan, Turkish Aerospace Industries, Roketsan, and ASFAT are among the top 100 defense companies in the world.

Turkey has participated in international missions under the United Nations and NATO since the Korean War, including peacekeeping missions in Somalia, Yugoslavia and the Horn of Africa. It supported coalition forces in the First Gulf War, contributed military personnel to the International Security Assistance Force in Afghanistan, and remains active in Kosovo Force, Eurocorps and EU Battlegroups. As of 2016, Turkey has assisted Peshmerga forces in northern Iraq and the Somali Armed Forces with security and training. The Turkish Armed Forces have a relatively substantial military presence abroad, with military bases in Albania, Iraq, Qatar, and Somalia. The country has had 36,000 troops in Northern Cyprus since 1974.

=== Human rights ===
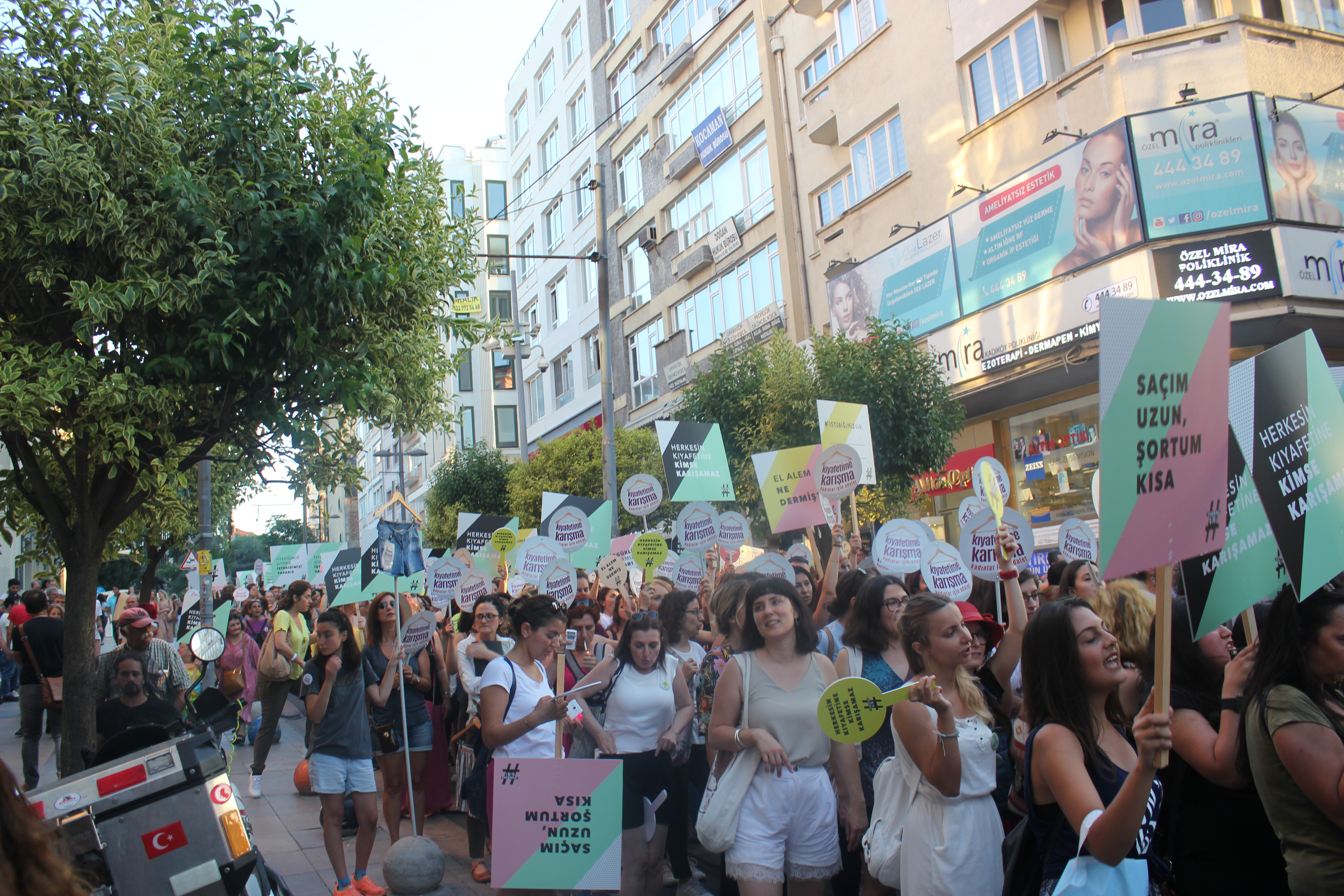
Women demonstrating and asking for non-interference with their clothing in Kadıköy, Istanbul

The Constitution includes references to upholding the rule of law and human rights, and says that international human rights conventions supersede national law. But Turkey has far more cases pending at the European Court of Human Rights (ECHR) than any other country, and in high profile cases sometimes ignores ECHR judgements. The Human Rights and Equality Institution of Turkey is the government body responsible for protecting human rights, but the EU says that its effectiveness and that of the ombudsman is limited.

The UN has criticised the government for keeping some pollution information from the public. Civil society organisation Human Rights Watch and others say that the government uses the justice system against opposition politicians.

In the 2000s, legal changes were made for public use of and teaching in the Kurdish language. This included opening a Kurdish-language national TV channel. Various "openings" were made to address concerns of minorities such as Alevi, ethnic Kurds, and ethnic Romani people. Sentences for violence against women were strengthened.

In 2013, widespread protests erupted, sparked by a plan to demolish Gezi Park but soon growing into general anti-government dissent.

Armenians, Greeks and Jews have at times been portrayed as undesirable or unwelcome groups (including by senior government officials) and subjected to racial slurs.

=== LGBTQ+ issues ===
Under the Republic, gay and lesbian sex has never been criminalized. However, LGBT people in Turkey face discrimination, harassment and even violence. With the first annual Istanbul Pride in 2003, Turkey became the first Muslim-majority country to hold a gay pride march. Since 2015, parades at Taksim Square and İstiklal Avenue have been denied government permission, citing security concerns, but hundreds of people have defied the ban each year. The bans were criticized, and the Turkish Human Rights Association says the government is targeting the LGBTQ+ community.

On the morning of 12 September 2026, police started raiding LGBTQ+ clubs and unions. Turkish police detained many people, and over 100 of them were held by regional courts. The police also raided Turkey's longest-running LGBTQ+ advocacy group, KAOS GL, and detained its board of directors. Justice Minister Akın Gürlek announced on social media that 13 businesses and 9 associations had been raided. Along with the raids, Turkish courts issued rulings to block the social media accounts of LGBTQ+ advocacy groups, human rights organizations, newspapers, and journalists, including groups such as Amnesty International, along with women's advocacy groups.

== Economy ==
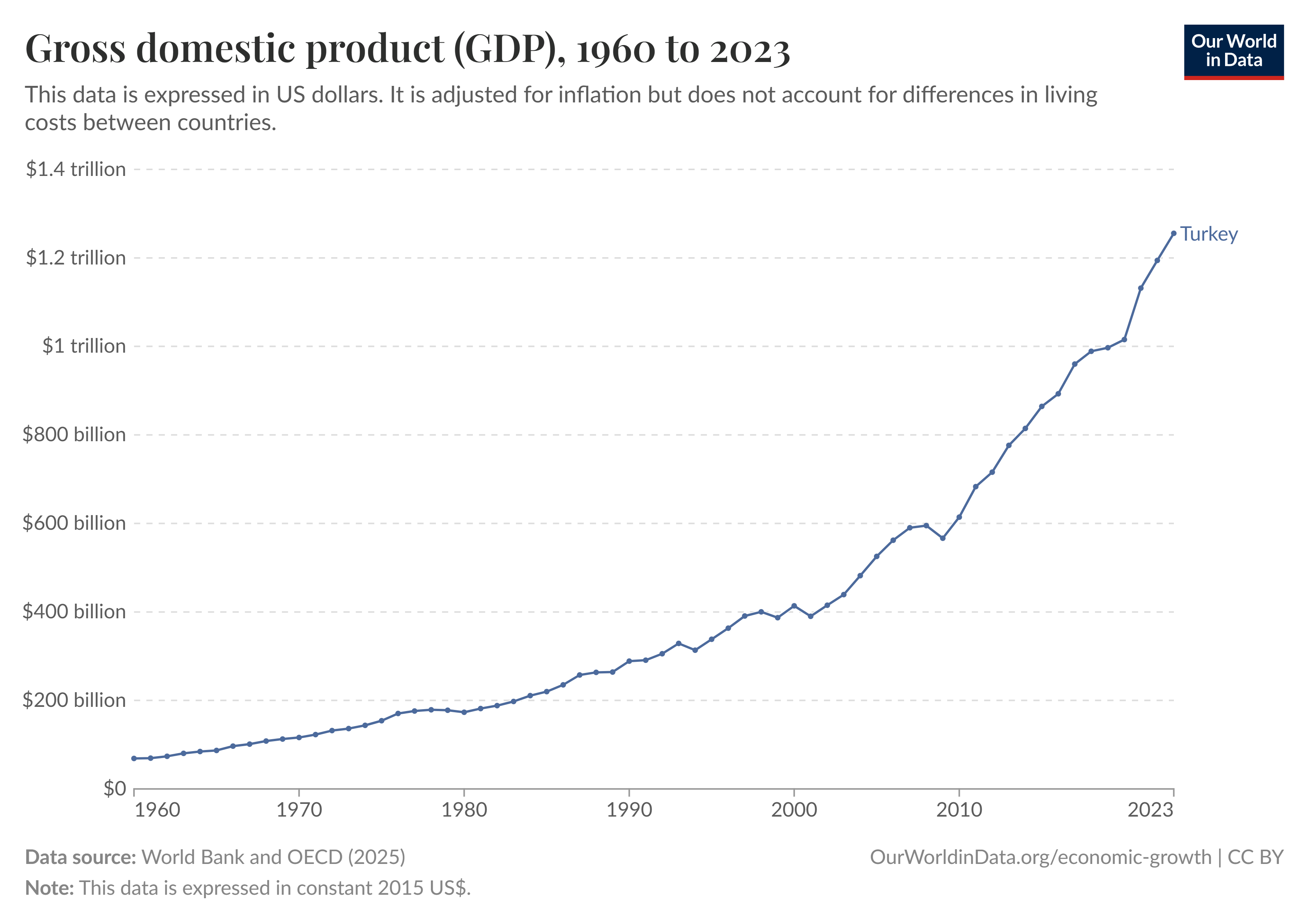
Turkey's nominal gross domestic product between 1960 and 2023 in 2015 constant US dollars

Turkey is an upper-middle-income country and an emerging market. A founding member of the OECD and G20, it has the 16th-largest economy by nominal and 11th-largest by PPP-adjusted GDP in the world. It is classified among newly industrialized countries. The service sector accounts for 61% of the economy, whereas industry accounts for 32% and agriculture contributes about 7%. According to IMF estimates, Turkey's GDP per capita by PPP is $43,790 in 2025, while its nominal GDP per capita is $18,200. Potential growth is weakened by long-lasting structural and macro obstacles, such as slow rates of productivity growth and high inflation.

Turkey has a diversified economy; main industries include automobiles, electronics, textiles, construction, steel, mining, and food processing. Machinery and manufacturing lead among products in Turkey's merchandise exports. Turkey is a major agricultural producer. It ranks 8th in crude steel production, and 13th in motor vehicle production, ship building (by tonnage), and annual industrial robot installation in the world. Turkish automative companies include TEMSA, Otokar, BMC and Togg. Togg is the first all-electric vehicle company of Turkey. Arçelik, Vestel, and Beko are major manufacturers of consumer electronics. Arçelik is one of the largest producers of household goods in the world. In 2022, Turkey ranked second in the world in terms of the number of international contractors in the top 250 list.

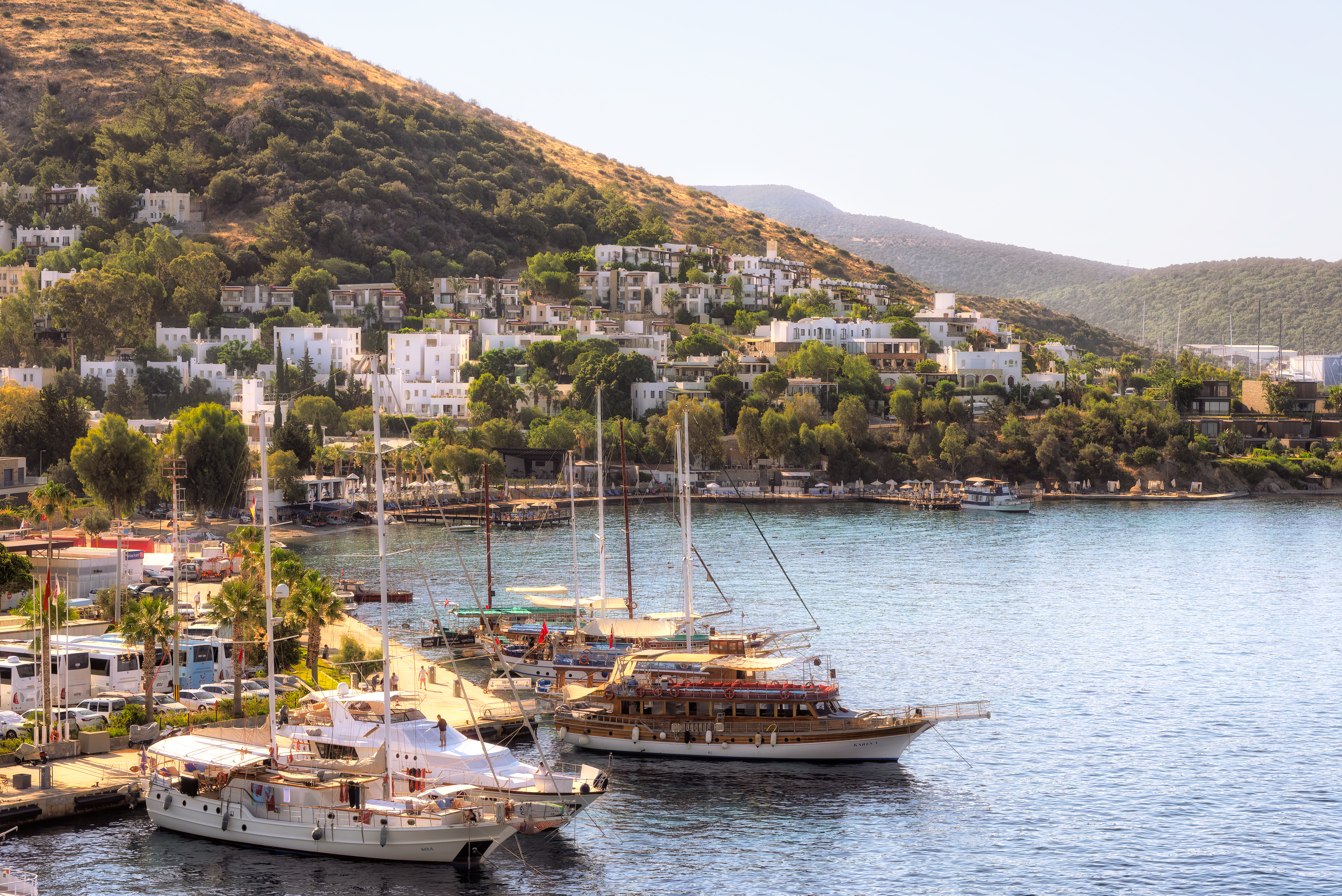
Bodrum in Turkish Riviera. Bodrum peninsula is a high-end spot for vacationers.

Turkey's services exports are mostly transport and tourism. Tourism accounts for about 8% of Turkey's GDP. In 2022, Turkey ranked fourth in the world in the number of international tourist arrivals with 50.5 million foreign tourists. Turkey has 22 UNESCO World Heritage Sites and 84 World Heritage Sites in tentative list. Turkey is home to 625 Blue Flag beaches, third most in the world. In 2024, Euromonitor International ranked Istanbul and Antalya among the top ten most visited cities in the world. Turkish Airlines is one of the largest airlines in the world.

Between 2007 and 2021, the share of population below the PPP-$6.85 per day international poverty threshold declined from 20% to 7.6%. In 2023, 13.9% of the population was below the national at-risk-of-poverty rate. In 2021, 34% of the population were at risk of poverty or social exclusion, using Eurostat definition. Unemployment in Turkey was 10.4% in 2022. In 2021, it was estimated that 47% of total disposable income was received by the top 20% of income earners, while the lowest 20% received only 6%. Compared to the OECD average, labor force participation of women is lower. Affordable childcare and better parental leave policies are needed to lift women's employment.

=== Infrastructure ===
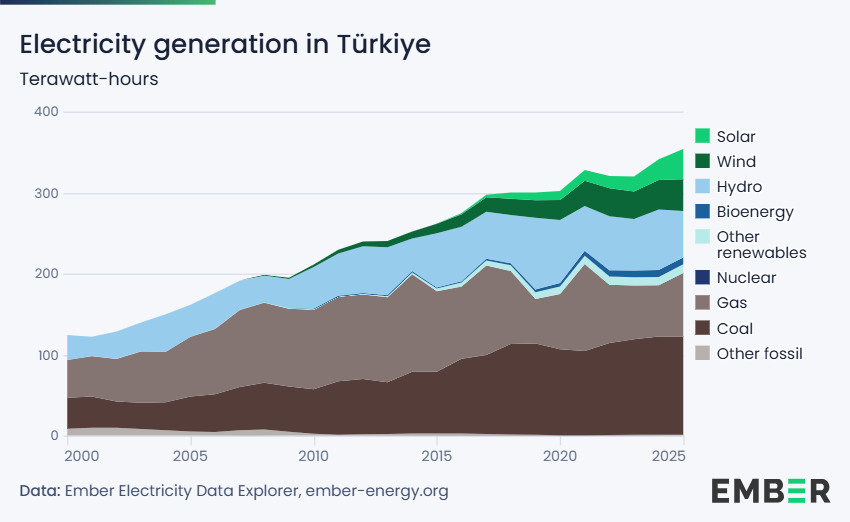
Installed electricity capacity in Turkey between 2000 and 2024 in terms of gigawatts

Turkey is the 15th-largest electricity and 13th-largest renewable electricity producer in the world. Turkey's energy generation capacity increased significantly, its electricity is about half from renewable sources. Turkey is also the fourth-largest producer of geothermal power in the world. Turkey's first nuclear power station, Akkuyu, will increase diversification of its energy mix. When it comes to total final consumption, fossil fuels still play a large role, accounting for 73%. A major reason of Turkey's greenhouse gas emissions is the large proportion of coal in the energy system. While the government has invested in low carbon energy transition, there are some fossil fuel subsidies until at least 2030. By 2053, Turkey aims to have net zero emissions.

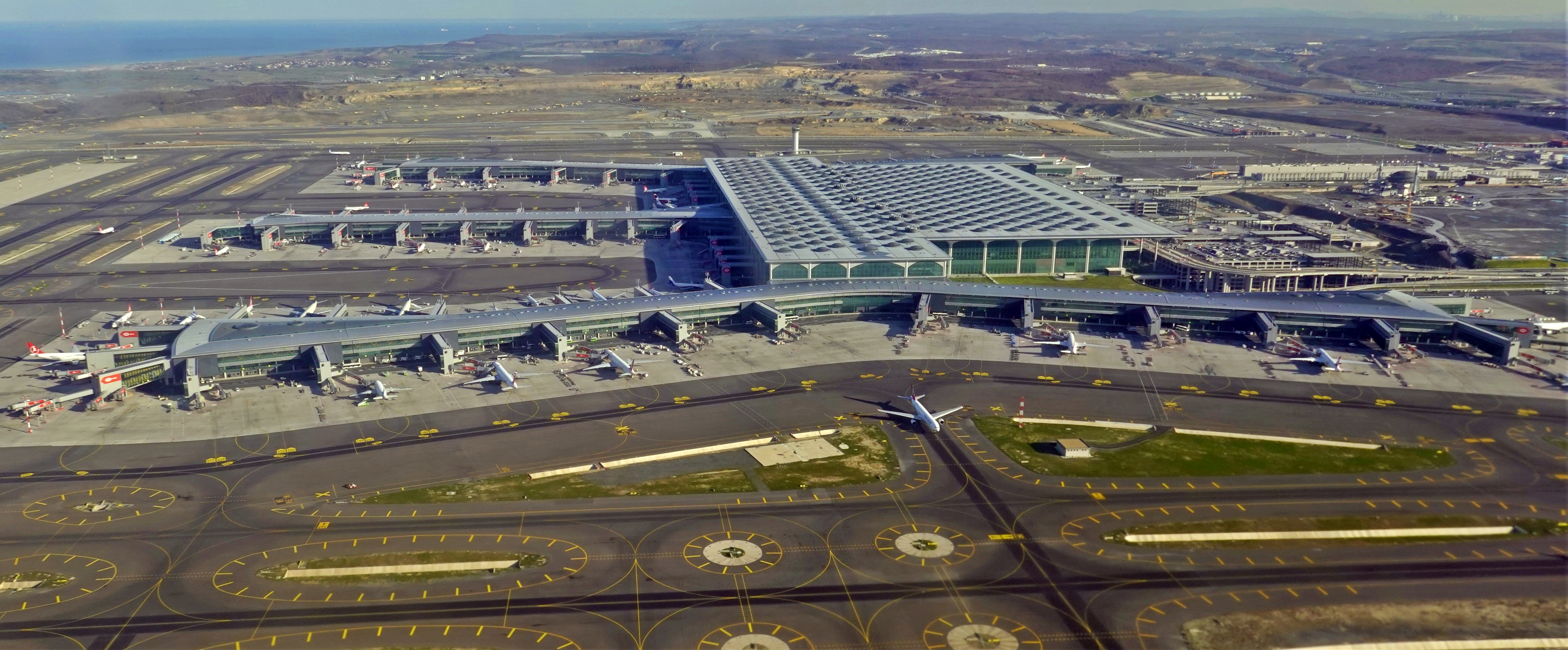
Istanbul Airport is one of the top 10 busiest airports in the world.

Turkey has made energy security a top priority, given its heavy reliance on gas and oil imports. Turkey's main energy supply sources are Russia, West Asia, and Central Asia. Gas production began in 2023 in the recently discovered Sakarya gas field. When fully operational, it will supply about 30% of the natural gas needed domestically. Turkey aims to become a hub for regional energy transportation. Several oil and gas pipelines span the country, including the Blue Stream, TurkStream, and Baku-Tbilisi-Ceyhan pipelines.

As of 2023, Turkey has 3,726 kilometers of controlled-access highways and 29,373 kilometers of divided highways. Multiple bridges and tunnels connect Asian and European sides of Turkey; the Çanakkale 1915 Bridge on the Dardanelles strait is the longest suspension bridge in the world. Marmaray and Eurasia tunnels under the Bosporus connect both sides of Istanbul. The Osman Gazi Bridge connects the northern and southern shores of the Gulf of İzmit.

Turkish State Railways operates both conventional and high speed trains, with the government expanding both. High-speed rail lines include the Ankara-Istanbul, Ankara-Konya, and Ankara-Sivas routes. Istanbul Metro is the largest subway network in the country with around 704 million annual ridership in 2019. There are 115 airports as of 2024. Istanbul Airport is one of the top 10 busiest airports in the world. Turkey aims to become a transportation hub. It is part of various routes that connect Asia and Europe, including the Middle Corridor. In 2024, Turkey, Iraq, UAE, and Qatar signed an agreement to link Iraqi port facilities to Turkey via road and rail connections. There is a lack of open data.

=== Science and technology ===
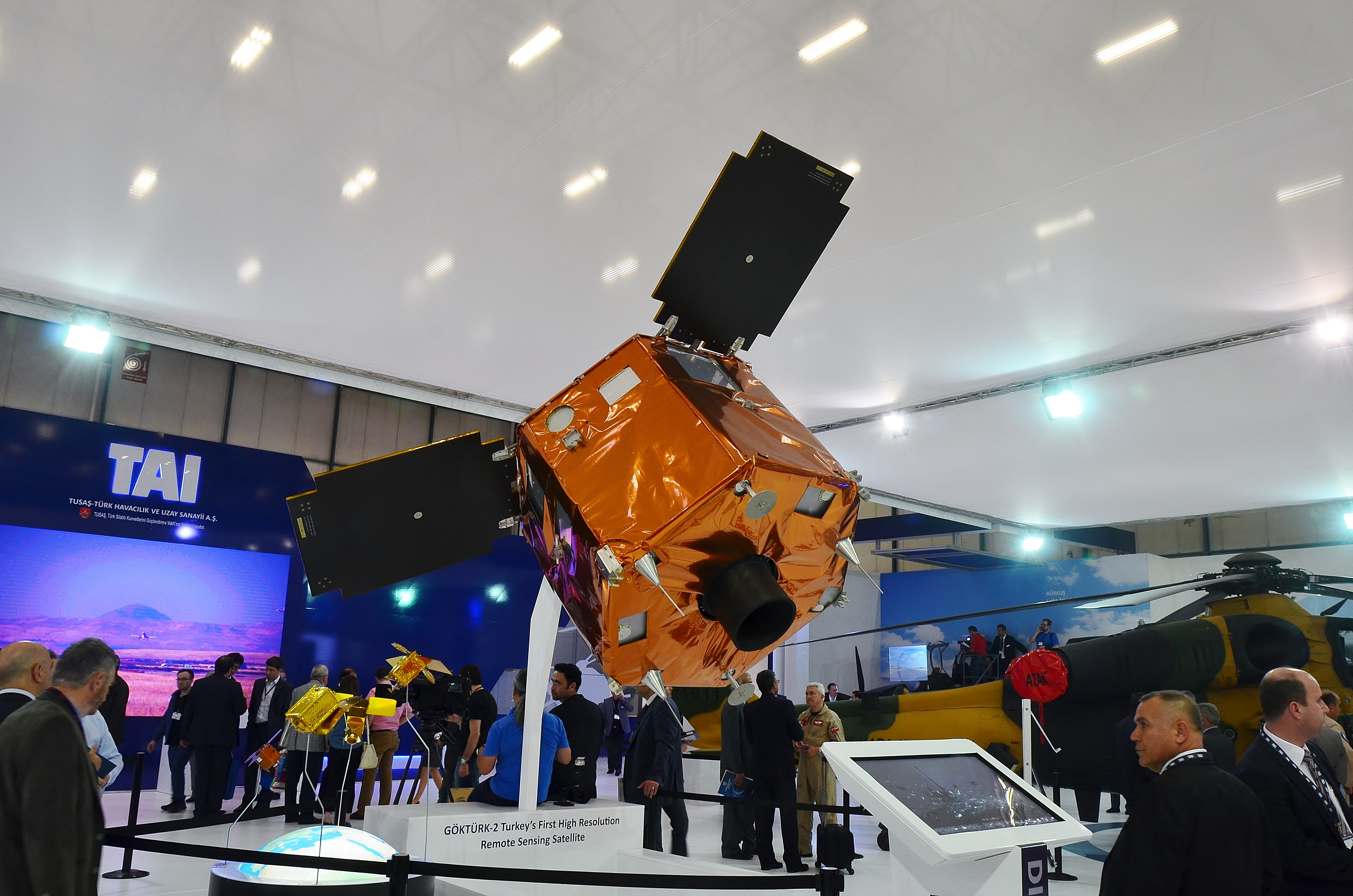
Göktürk-1, Göktürk-2 and Göktürk-3 are the Earth observation satellites of the Turkish Ministry of National Defense, while state-owned Türksat operates the Türksat series of communications satellites.

Turkey's spending on research and development as a share of GDP has risen from 0.47% in 2000 to 1.40% in 2023, although it is still around half of the average for the OECD. Turkey ranks 16th in the world in terms of article output in scientific and technical journals, and 35th in Nature Index. Turkish patent office ranks 21st worldwide in overall patent applications, and 3rd in industrial design applications. Vast majority of applicants to the Turkish patent office are Turkish residents. In all patent offices globally, Turkish residents rank 21st for overall patent applications. In 2025, Turkey ranked 43rd in the world in the Global Innovation Index. TÜBİTAK is one of the main agencies for funding and carrying out research.

Although Turkey needs more national innovation, it is improving in areas such as high technology and defense. To boost the output of high-value-added products, Turkey launched its National Technology Initiative in 2019. In line with its research priorities, Turkey developed roadmaps in various areas such as advanced materials, artificial intelligence, biotechnology, internet of things, nanoelectronics, robotics, and quantum technology. Some of the main science and technology programs include the National Research Program, Industry and Technology Strategy, Climate Change Strategy, National Artificial Intelligence Strategy, and National Space Program. In 2024 and 2025, Turkey's first electron accelerator, quantum computer, and communication satellite manufactured domestically became operational.

== Demographics ==
According to the Address-Based Population Recording System, the country's population was 86 million in 2025, excluding Syrians under temporary protection. 94% lived in province and district centers. People within the 15–64 and 0–14 age groups corresponded to 69% and 20% of the total population, respectively. Those aged 65 years or older made up 11%. Between 1950 and 2020, Turkey's population more than quadrupled from 20.9 million to 83.6 million; however, the population growth rate was 0.1% in 2023. In 2023, the total fertility rate was 1.51 children per woman, below the replacement rate of 2.10 per woman.

Largest cities or towns in Turkey TÜİK's address-based calculation from 31 December 2023 published on 7 February 2024.
Rank	Name	Pop.	Rank	Name	Pop.
1	Istanbul	15,655,924	11	Mersin	1,938,389
2	Ankara	5,803,482	12	Diyarbakır	1,818,133
3	İzmir	4,479,525	13	Hatay	1,544,640
4	Bursa	3,214,571	14	Manisa	1,475,716
5	Antalya	2,696,249	15	Kayseri	1,445,683
6	Konya	2,320,241	16	Samsun	1,377,546
7	Adana	2,270,298	17	Balıkesir	1,273,519
8	Şanlıurfa	2,213,964	18	Tekirdağ	1,167,059
9	Gaziantep	2,164,134	19	Aydın	1,161,702
10	Kocaeli	2,102,907	20	Van	1,127,612

=== Ethnicity and language ===
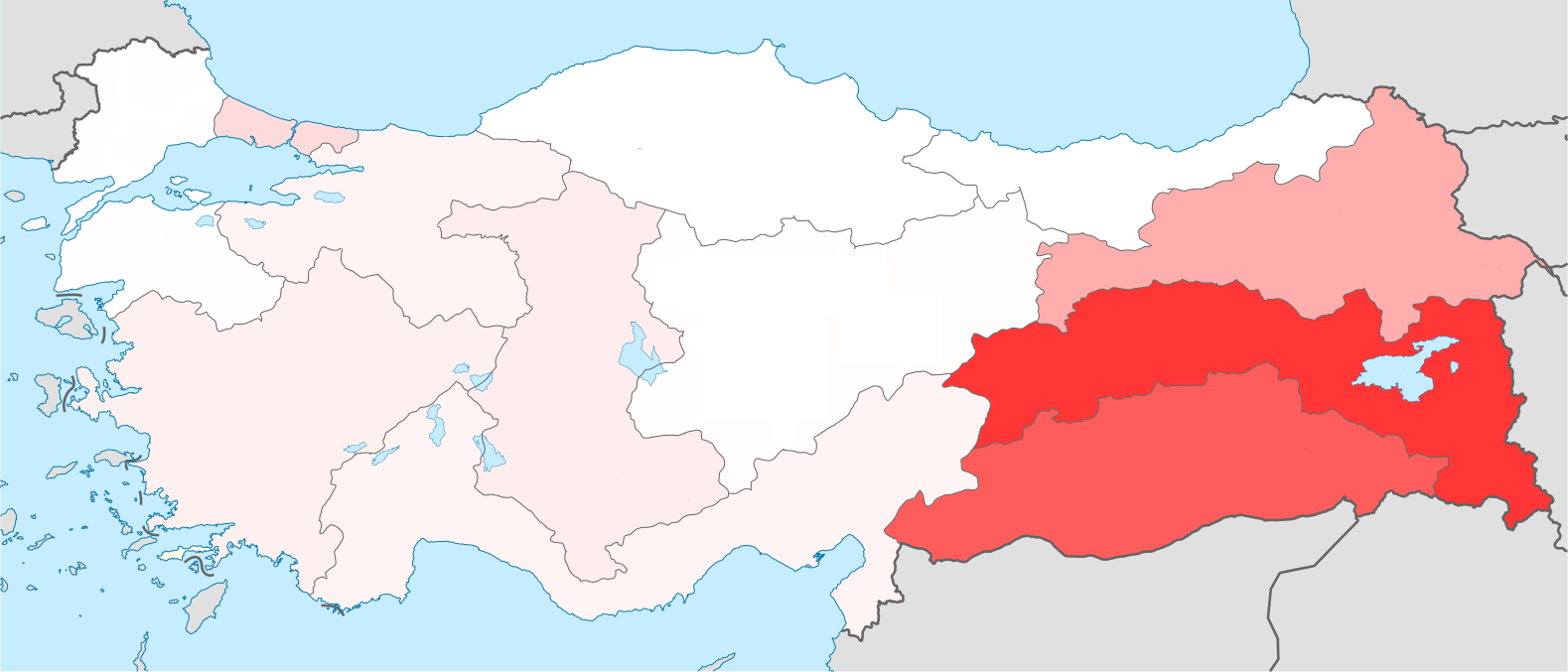
Percentage of ethnic Kurds in Turkey by region (2010)

Article 66 of the Turkish Constitution defines a Turk as anyone who is a citizen. It is estimated that there are at least 47 ethnic groups represented in Turkey. Reliable data on the ethnic mix of the population is not available because census figures do not include statistics on ethnicity after the 1965 Turkish census. In 2021, 77% of adult citizens identified as Turk.

Kurds are the largest ethnic minority. Their exact numbers remain disputed, with estimates ranging from 12 to 20% of the population. The Kurds make up a majority in the provinces of Ağrı, Batman, Bingöl, Bitlis, Diyarbakır, Hakkari, Iğdır, Mardin, Muş, Siirt, Şırnak, Tunceli and Van; a near majority in Şanlıurfa (47%); and a large minority in Kars (20%). In addition, internal migration has resulted in Kurdish diaspora communities in all of the major cities in central and western Turkey. In Istanbul, there are an estimated three million Kurds, making it the city with the largest Kurdish population in the world. 19% of adult citizens identified as ethnic Kurds in a survey in 2021. Some people have multiple ethnic identities, such as both Turk and Kurd. In 2006, an estimated 2.7 million ethnic Turks and Kurds were related from interethnic marriages.

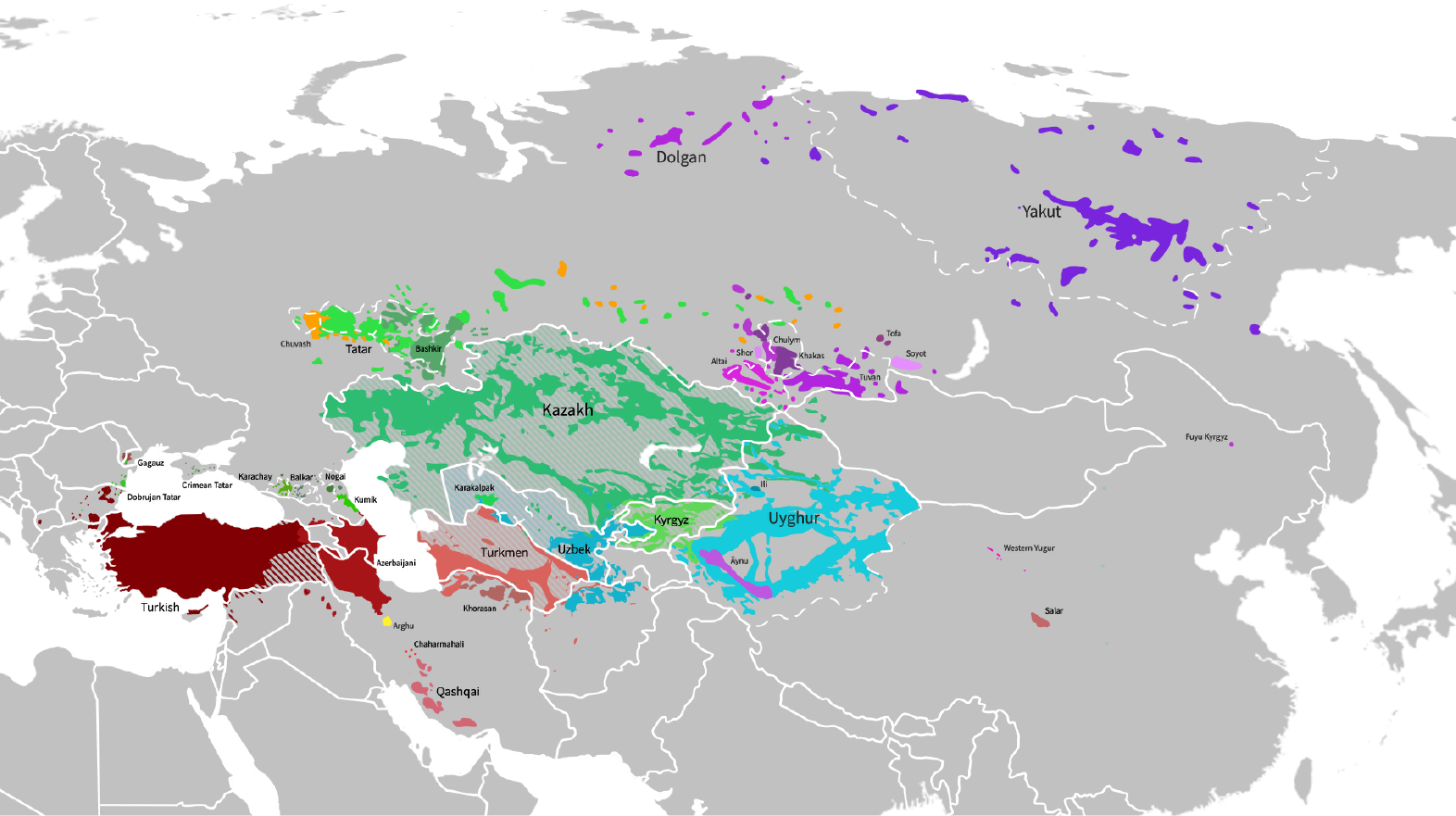
The distribution of the Turkic languages

According to the World Factbook, non-Kurdish ethnic minorities are 7–12% of the population. In 2006, KONDA estimated that non-Kurdish and non-Zaza ethnic minorities constituted 8.2% of the population; these were people who gave general descriptions such as Turkish citizen, people with other Turkic backgrounds, Arabs, and others. In 2021, 4% of adult citizens identified as non-ethnic Turk or non-ethnic Kurd in a survey. According to the Constitutional Court, there are only four officially recognized minorities in Turkey: the three non-Muslim minorities recognized in the Treaty of Lausanne (Armenians, Greeks, and Jews (Note: Even though they are not explicitly mentioned in the Treaty of Lausanne)) and the Bulgarians. (Note: The Bulgarian community in Turkey is now so small that this disposition is de facto not applied.) In 2013, the Ankara 13th Circuit Administrative Court ruled that the minority provisions of the Lausanne Treaty should also apply to Assyrians in Turkey and the Syriac language. Other unrecognized ethnic groups include Crimean Tatars, Albanians, Bosniaks, Circassians, Georgians, Laz, Pomaks, and Roma.

The official language is Turkish, which is the most widely spoken Turkic language in the world. It is spoken by 85% to 90% of the population as a first language. Kurdish speakers are the largest linguistic minority. A survey estimated 13% of the population speak Kurdish or Zaza as a first language. Other minority languages include Arabic, Caucasian languages, and Gagauz. The linguistic rights of the officially recognized minorities are de jure recognized and protected for Armenian, Bulgarian, Greek, Hebrew, (Note: The Turkish government considers that, for the purpose of the Treaty of Lausanne, the language of Turkish Jews is Hebrew, even though the mother tongue of Turkish Jews was not Hebrew but historically Judaeo-Spanish (Ladino) or other Jewish languages.) and Syriac. There are multiple endangered languages in Turkey.

=== Immigration ===
Excluding Syrians under temporary protection, there were 1,570,543 foreign citizens in Turkey in 2023.

Following the suppression of the Kurdish uprising in spring 1991, after the Gulf War ceasefire, hundreds of thousands of Kurds fled toward the Turkish border. Turkey largely refused entry, leaving many stranded in the mountains; the UNHCR estimated around 280,000 had crossed into Turkey by April 6, 1991. Most returned to Iraq within months after the establishment of a UN-protected safe haven in northern Iraq, with only around 8,000 remaining in Turkey by early 1992.

Turkey's migrant crisis in the 2010s and early 2020s resulted in the influx of millions of refugees and immigrants. Turkey hosts the largest number of refugees in the world as of April 2020. The Disaster and Emergency Management Presidency manages the refugee crisis in Turkey. Before the start of the Syrian civil war in 2011, the estimated number of Arabs in Turkey varied from 1 million to more than 2 million.

In November 2020, there were 3.6 million Syrian refugees in Turkey; these included other ethnic groups of Syria, such as Syrian Kurds and Syrian Turkmens. As of August 2023, the number of these refugees was estimated to be 3.3 million. The number of Syrians had decreased by about 200,000 people since the beginning of the year. The government has granted citizenship to 238 thousand Syrians by November 2023. As of May 2023, approximately 96,000 Ukrainian refugees of the 2022 Russian invasion of Ukraine have sought refuge in Turkey. In 2022, nearly 100,000 Russian citizens migrated to Turkey, becoming the first in the list of foreigners who moved to Turkey, meaning an increase of more than 218% from 2021.

=== Religion ===
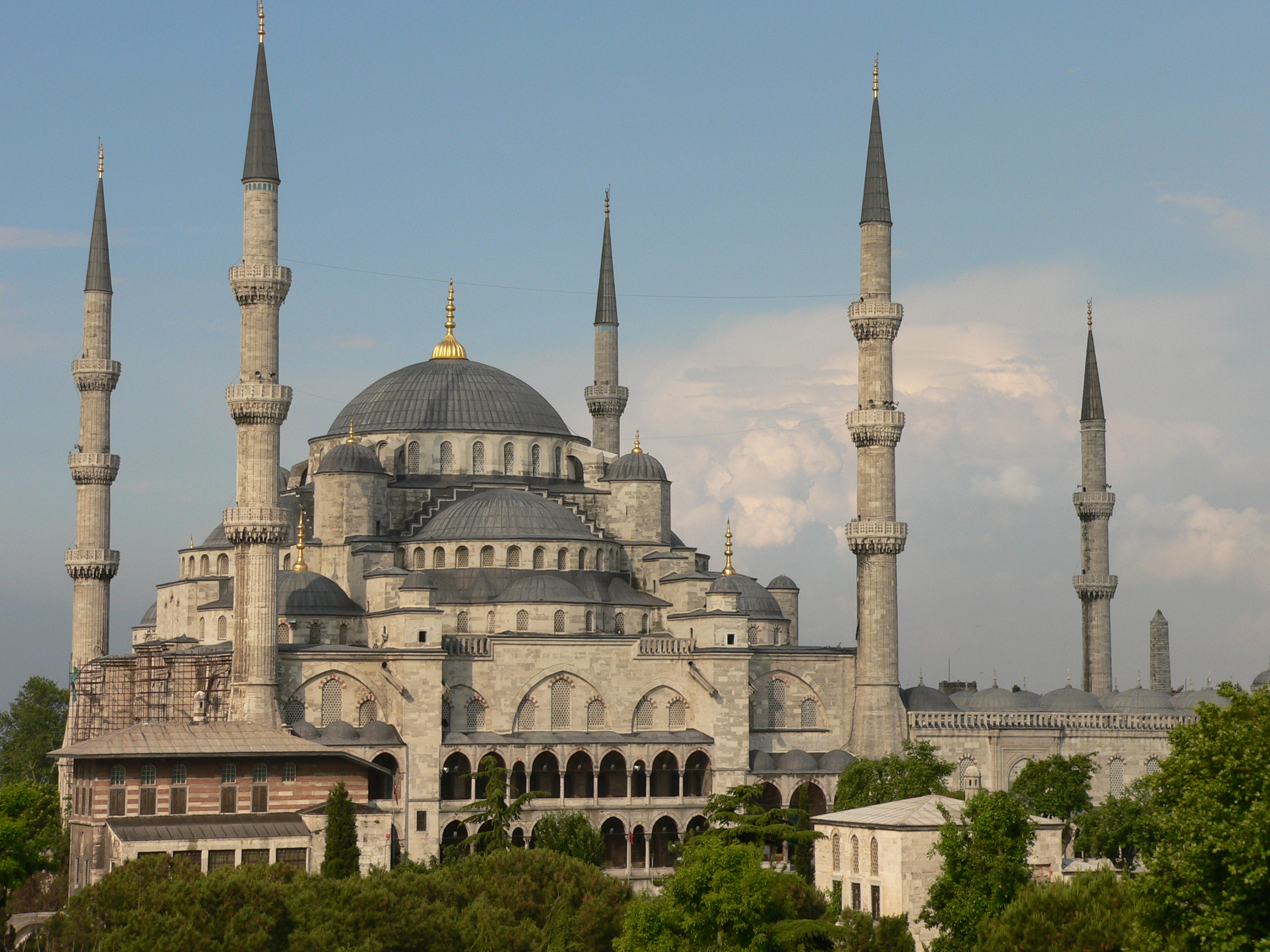
Sultan Ahmed Mosque, also known as Blue Mosque in Istanbul, is one of the most iconic and popular monuments of Ottoman architecture.

Turkey is a secular state with no official state religion; the constitution provides for freedom of religion and conscience. According to the CIA World Factbook, Muslims constitute 99.8% of the population, most of them being Sunni. Based on a survey, KONDA's estimate for Muslims was 99.4% in 2006. According to Minority Rights Group International, estimates of share of Alevi are between 10% and 40% of the population. KONDA's estimate was 5% in 2006. 4% of adult citizens identified as Alevi in a survey in 2021, while 88% identified as Sunni.

The percentage of non-Muslims in modern-day Turkey was 19.1% in 1914, but fell to 2.5% in 1927. Currently, non-Muslims constitute 0.2% of the population according to the World Factbook. In 2006, KONDA's estimate was that 0.18% of the population adhered to non-Islamic religions. Some of the non-Muslim communities are Armenians, Assyrians, Bulgarian Orthodox, Catholics, Greeks, Jews, and Protestants. Sources estimate that the Christian population in Turkey ranges between 180,000 and 320,000. Turkey has the largest Jewish community among the Muslim-majority countries. Currently, there are 439 churches and synagogues in Turkey.

In 2006, KONDA estimated that 0.47% of the population had no religion. According to KONDA, the share of adult citizens who identified as nonbelievers increased from 2% in 2011 to 6% in 2021. A 2020 Gezici Araştırma poll found that 28.5% of the Generation Z identified as irreligious.

=== Education ===
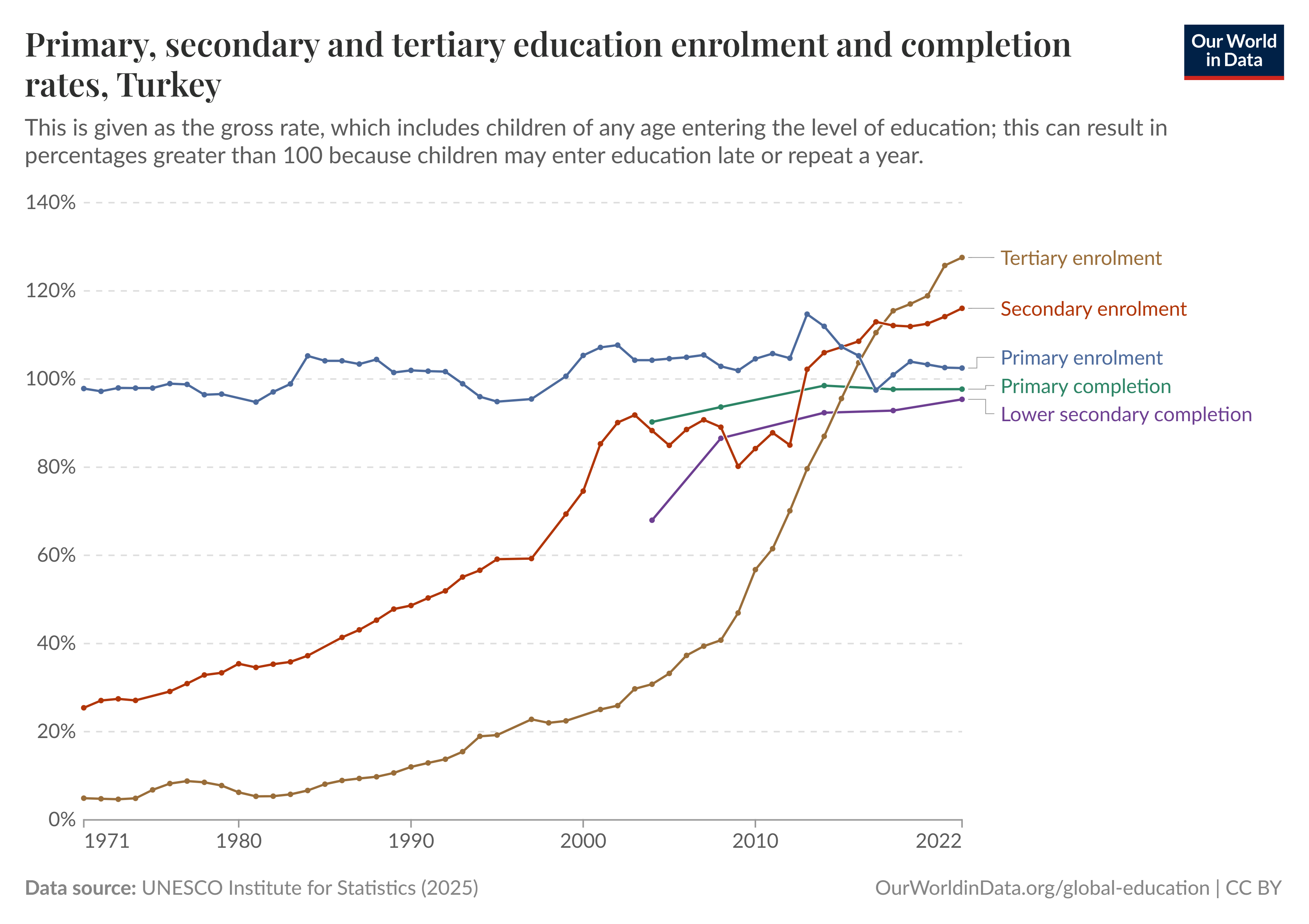
Enrollment rates for primary, secondary and tertiary education in Turkey between 1971 and 2022. Completion rates for primary and lower secondary education.

In the past 20 years, Turkey has improved quality of education and has made significant progress in increasing education access. From 2011 to 2021, improvements in education access include significant rise in the rates of upper secondary and tertiary education completion, and quadrupling of pre-school institutions. PISA results suggest improvements in education quality. There is still a gap with OECD countries. Significant challenges include differences in student outcomes from different schools, differences between rural and urban areas, pre-primary education access, and arrival of students who are Syrian refugees.

The Ministry of National Education is responsible for pre-tertiary education. Compulsory education is free at public schools and lasts 12 years, divided into three parts. There are 208 universities in Turkey. Students are placed to universities based on their YKS results and their preferences, by the Measuring, Selection and Placement Center. All state and private universities are under the control of the Higher Education Board. Since 2016, the president of Turkey directly appoints all rectors of all state and private universities.

According to the 2024 Times Higher Education ranking, the top universities were Koç University, Middle East Technical University, Sabancı University, and Istanbul Technical University. According to Academic Ranking of World Universities, the top ones were Istanbul University, University of Health Sciences (Turkey), and Hacettepe University. For foreign students, Turkey has become a regional hub, with a large number of international students and international scholarships.

=== Health ===
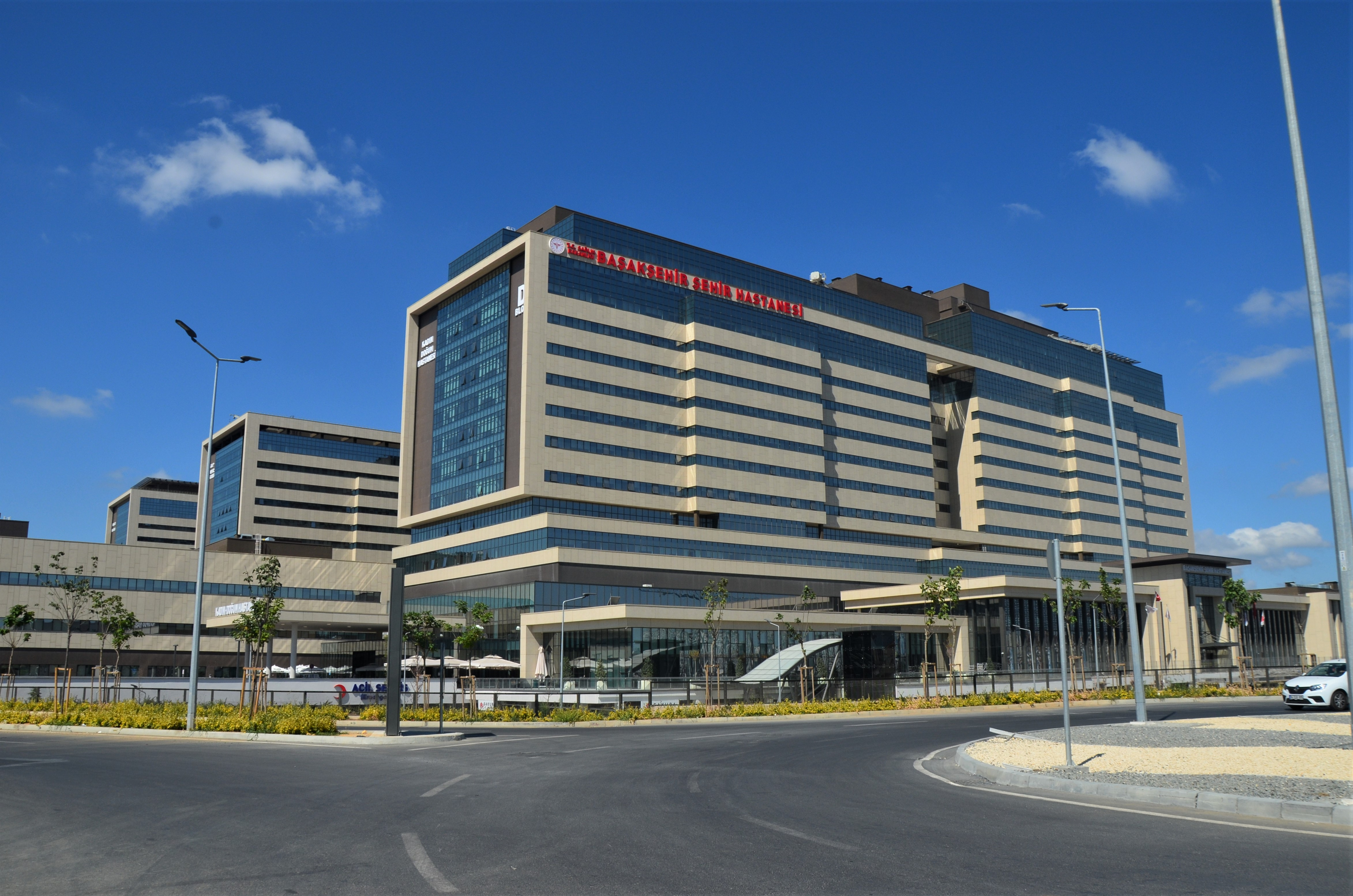
Başakşehir Çam and Sakura City Hospital in Istanbul. It contains 2,068 seismic base isolation units to withstand earthquakes.

The Ministry of Health has run a universal public healthcare system since 2003. Known as Universal Health Insurance (Genel Sağlık Sigortası), it is funded by a tax surcharge on employers, currently at 5%. Public-sector funding covers approximately 75.2% of health expenditures. Despite the universal health care, total expenditure on health as a share of GDP in 2018 was the lowest among OECD countries at 6.3% of GDP, compared to the OECD average of 9.3%. There are many private hospitals in the country. The government planned several hospital complexes, known as city hospitals, to be constructed since 2013. Turkey is one of the top 10 destinations for health tourism.

Average life expectancy is 78.6 years (75.9 for males and 81.3 for females), compared with the EU average of 81 years. Turkey has high rates of obesity, with 29.5% of its adult population having a body mass index (BMI) value of 30 or above. Air pollution is a major cause of early death.

== Culture ==
In the 19th century, Turkish identity was debated in the Ottoman Empire, with three main views: Turkism, Islamism and Westernism. In addition to Europe or Islam, Turkish culture was also influenced by Anatolia's native cultures. After the establishment of the republic, Kemalism emphasized Turkish culture, attempted to make "Islam a matter of personal conviction", and pursued modernization. Currently, Turkey has various local cultures. Things such as music, folk dance, or kebap variety may be used to identify a local area. Turkey also has a national culture, such as national sports leagues, music bands, film stars, and trends in fashion. Turkey is home to 21 UNESCO World Heritage sites and 31 UNESCO intangible cultural heritage inscriptions.

=== Architecture ===
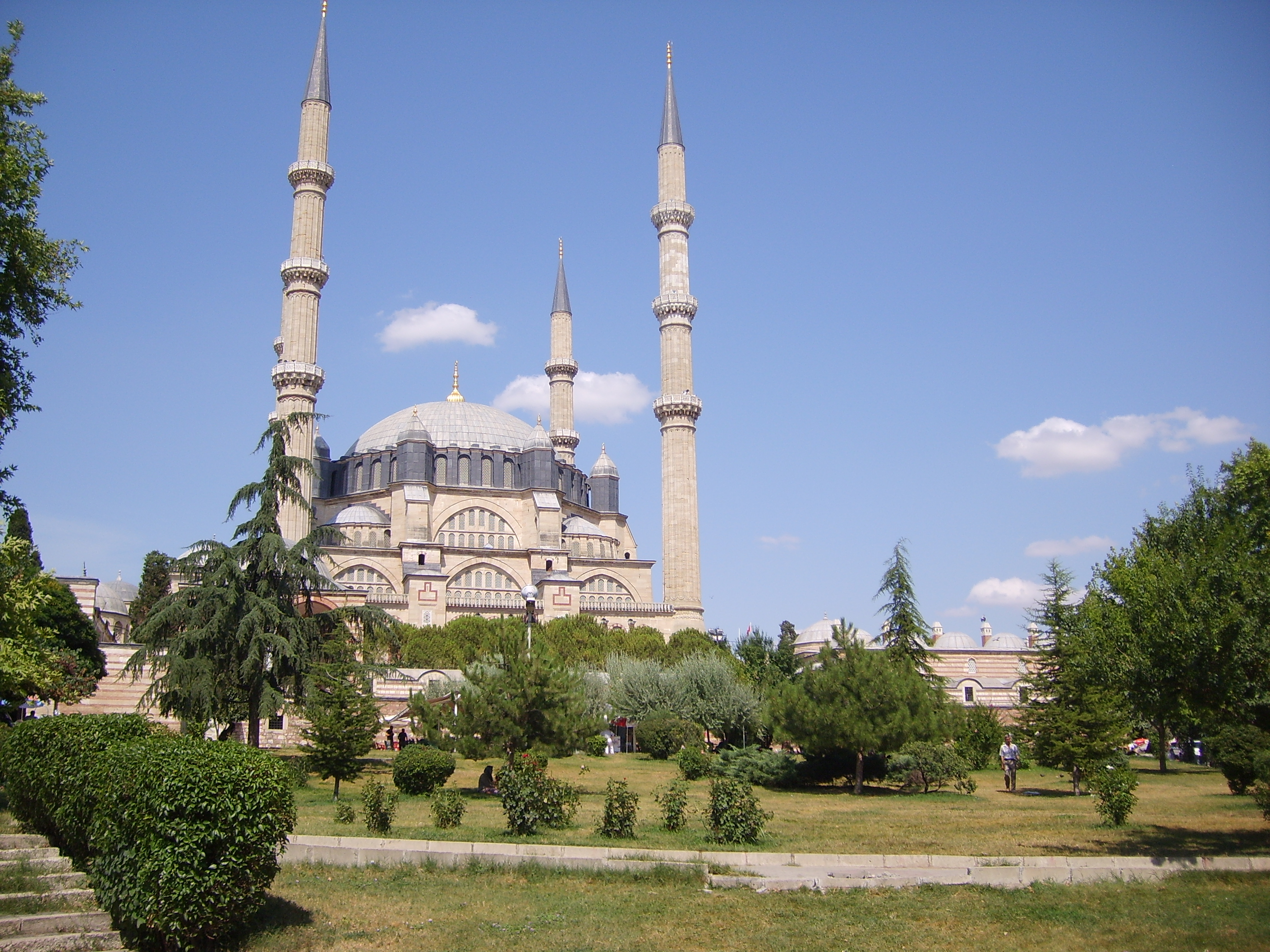
Built by Mimar Sinan, Selimiye Mosque in Edirne is an example of classical Ottoman architecture.

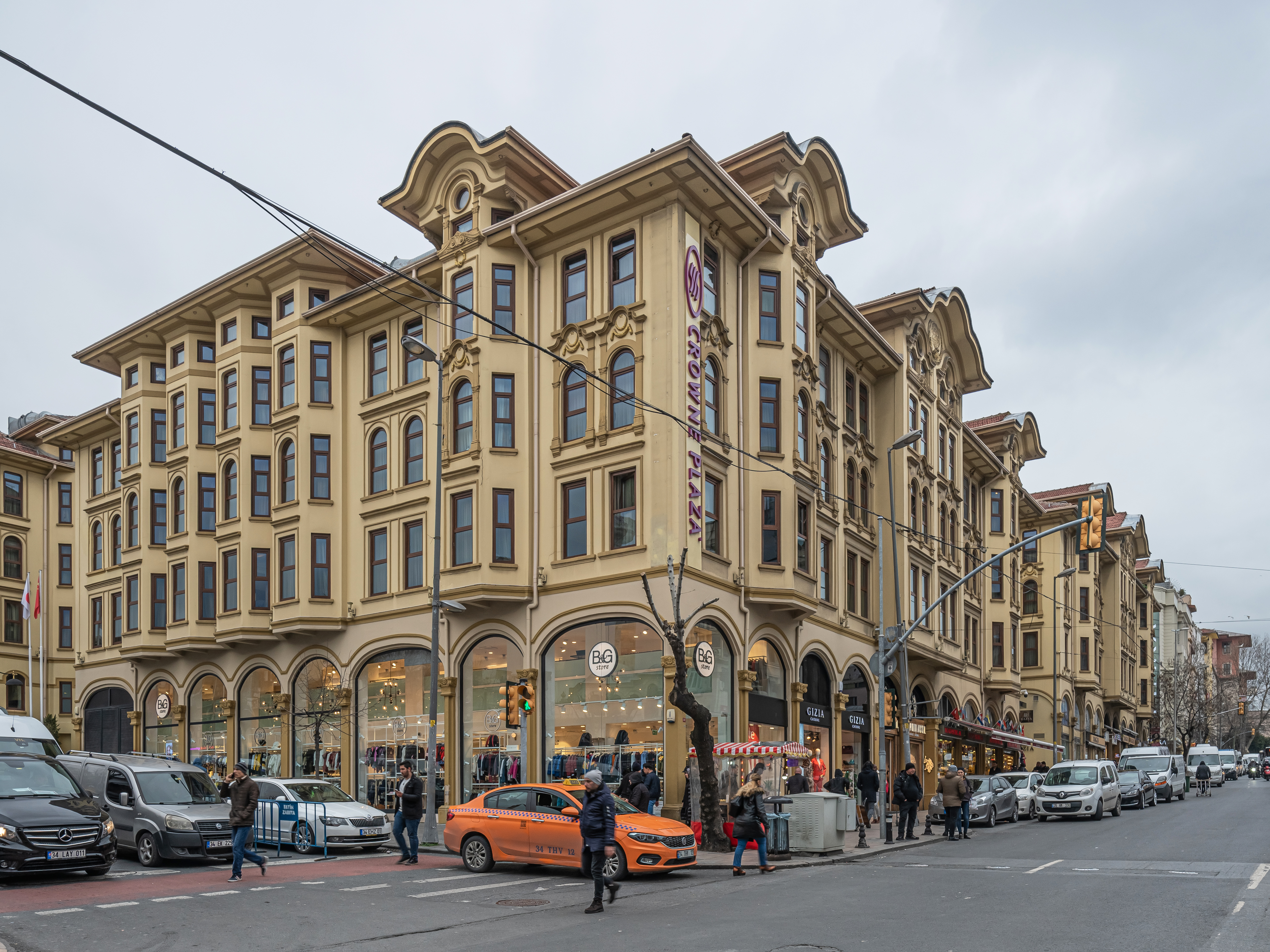
Tayyare Apartments in Istanbul, an example of the first national architectural movement

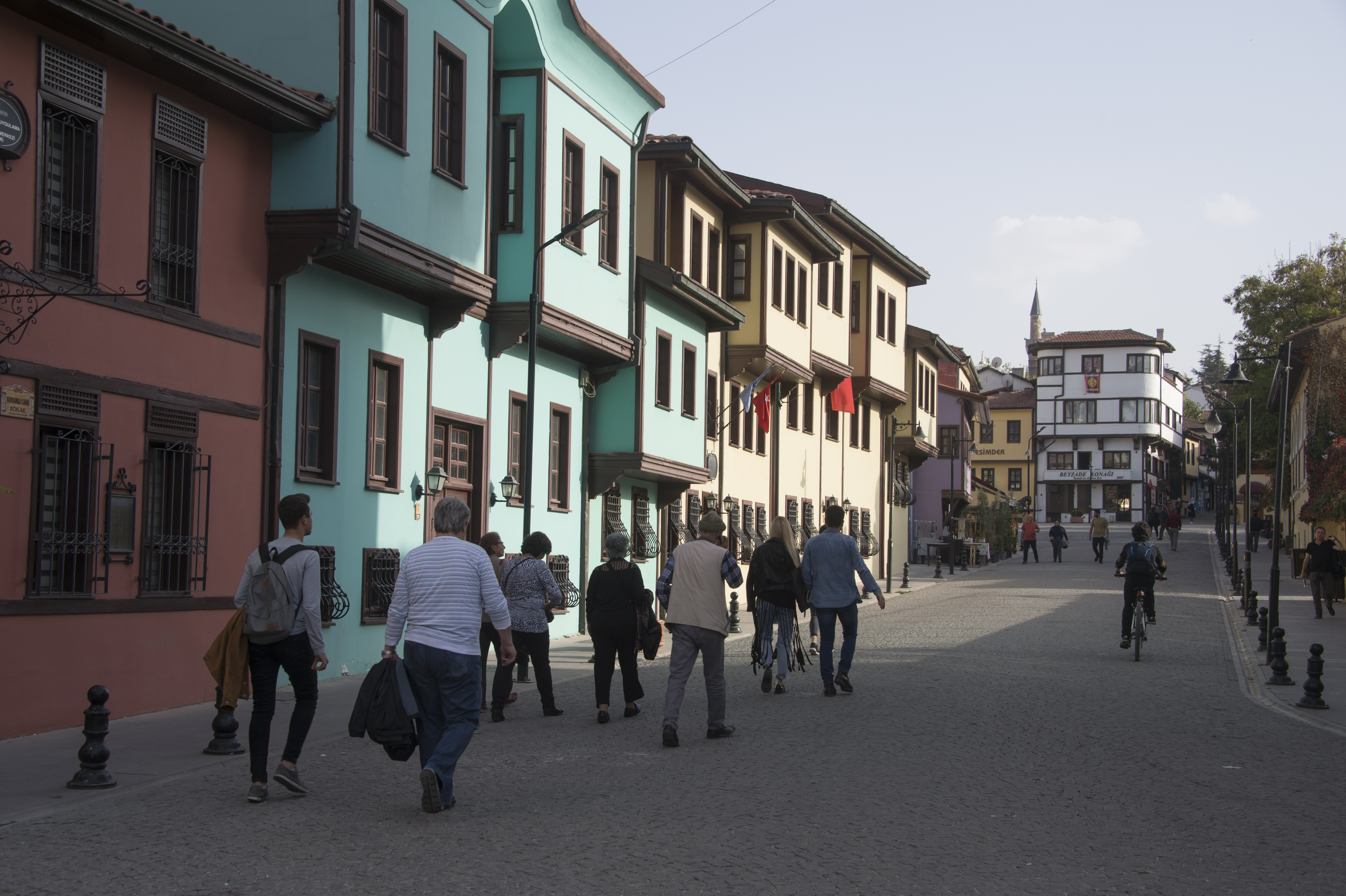
With its traditional Turkish houses, Odunpazarı district in Eskişehir is a tentative UNESCO World Heritage site.

Turkey is home to numerous Neolithic settlements, such as Çatalhöyük. From the Bronze Age, important architectural remnants include Alaca Höyük and the 2nd layer of Troy. There are various examples of Ancient Greek and Ancient Roman architectures, especially in the Aegean region. Byzantine architecture dates back to the 4th century AD. Its best example is Hagia Sophia. Byzantine architectural style continued to develop after the conquest of Istanbul, such as Byzantine Revival architecture. During Seljuk Sultanate of Rum and Turkish principalities period, a distinct architecture emerged, which incorporated Byzantine and Armenian architectures with architectural styles found in West Asia and Central Asia. Seljuk architecture often used stones and bricks, and produced numerous caravanserais, madrasas and mausoleums.

Ottoman architecture emerged in northwest Anatolia and Thrace. Early Ottoman architecture mixed "traditional Anatolian Islamic architecture with local building materials and techniques". Following the conquest of Istanbul, classical Ottoman architecture emerged in the 16th and 17th centuries. The most important architect of the classical period is Mimar Sinan, whose major works include the Şehzade Mosque, Süleymaniye Mosque, and Selimiye Mosque. Beginning in the 18th century, Ottoman architecture was influenced by European elements, resulting in development of Ottoman baroque style. European influence continued in the 19th century; examples include works of Balyan family such as neo-Baroque style Dolmabahçe Palace. The last period of Ottoman architecture consists of the First National Architectural Movement, including works of Vedat Tek and Mimar Kemaleddin.

Turkish architecture since 1918 can be divided into three periods. 1918 to 1950 includes the First National Architectural Movement, which transitioned into modernist architecture. Modernist and monumental buildings were preferred for public buildings, whereas "Turkish house" type vernacular architecture influenced private houses. The period from 1950 to 1980 includes urbanization, modernization, and internationalization. For residential housing, "reinforced concrete, slab-block, medium-rise apartments" became prevalent. Since 1980, Turkish architecture has been defined by consumer habits and international trends, such as shopping malls and office towers. Luxury residences with "Turkish house style" have been in demand. In the 21st century, urban renewal projects have become a trend. Resilience against natural disasters such as earthquakes is one of the main goals for urban renewal projects. Around one-third of Turkey's building stock, 6.7 million units, have been assessed as risky and needing urban renewal.

=== Literature, theatre, and visual arts ===
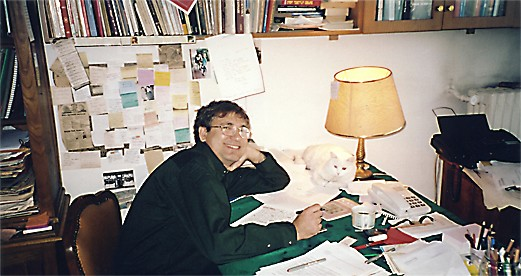
Nobel-laureate Turkish novelist Orhan Pamuk and his Turkish Angora cat at his personal writing space

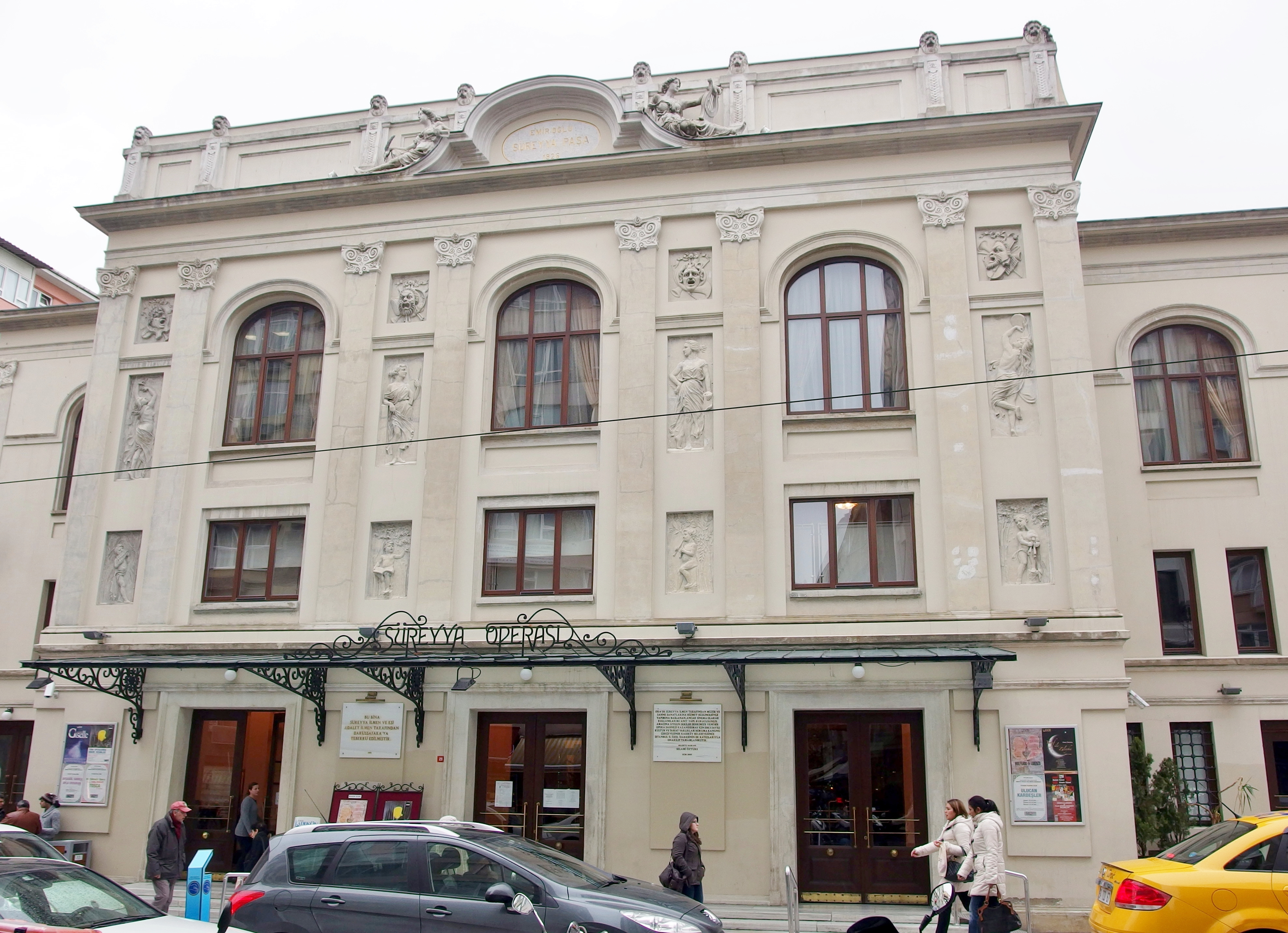
Süreyya Opera House is on the Asian side of Istanbul and Atatürk Cultural Center is the main opera house on the European side. Zorlu PSM is the city's largest performing arts theater and concert hall.

Turkish literature goes back more than a thousand years. The Seljuk and Ottoman periods include numerous works of literature and poetry. Turkic tales and poetry from Central Asia were also kept alive. Tales of Dede Korkut is an example of the oral narrative tradition. Dīwān Lughāt al-Turk, from the 11th century, contains Turkish linguistic information and poetry. Yunus Emre, influenced by Rumi, was one of the most important writers of Anatolian Turkish poetry. Ottoman Divan poetry used "refined diction" and complex vocabulary. It included Sufi mysticism, romanticism, and formal elements.

From the 19th century, Ottoman literature was influenced by the West. New genres, such as novels and journalistic style, were introduced. Aşk-ı Memnu, written by Halid Ziya Uşaklıgil, was the "first truly refined Turkish novel". Fatma Aliye Topuz, the first female Turkish novelist, wrote fiction. After the proclamation of the republic in 1923, Atatürk instituted reforms such as the language reform and alphabet reform. Since then, Turkish literature reflected the socioeconomic conditions in Turkey with increasing variety. "Village Novel" genre appeared in the mid-1950s, which talked about difficulties faced from poverty. An example is Memed, My Hawk by Yaşar Kemal, which was Turkey's first Nobel Prize in Literature nominee in 1973. Orhan Pamuk won the 2006 Nobel Prize in Literature.

Turkey has four "major theatrical traditions": "folk theatre, popular theatre, court theater, and Western theater." Turkish folk theatre goes back thousands of years and has survived among rural communities. Popular theatre includes plays by live actors, puppet and shadow plays, and storytelling performances. An example for shadow play is Karagöz and Hacivat. Court theatre was the refined version of popular theatre. Beginning in the 19th century, Western theatre tradition started appearing in Turkey. Following the establishment of Turkish Republic, a state conservatory and the State Theatre Company were formed.

Turkey's visual arts scene can be categorized into two, as "decorative" and "fine" arts. Fine arts, or güzel sanatlar, includes sculpture and painting. Turkish artists in these areas have gained global recognition. Photography, fashion design, graphic arts, and graphic design are some of the other areas Turkish artists are known for in the world. The inaugural contemporary Turkish art sale by Sotheby's London was in 2009. Istanbul Modern and the Istanbul Biennial are examples of art galleries or exhibitions of contemporary Turkish art. Turkey has also seen a resurgence of traditional arts. This includes Ottoman-era traditional arts, such as ceramics and carpets. Textile and carpet design, glass and ceramics, calligraphy, paper marbling (ebru) are some of the art forms for which modern-day Turkish artists are recognized as leaders in the Islamic world.

=== Music and dance ===
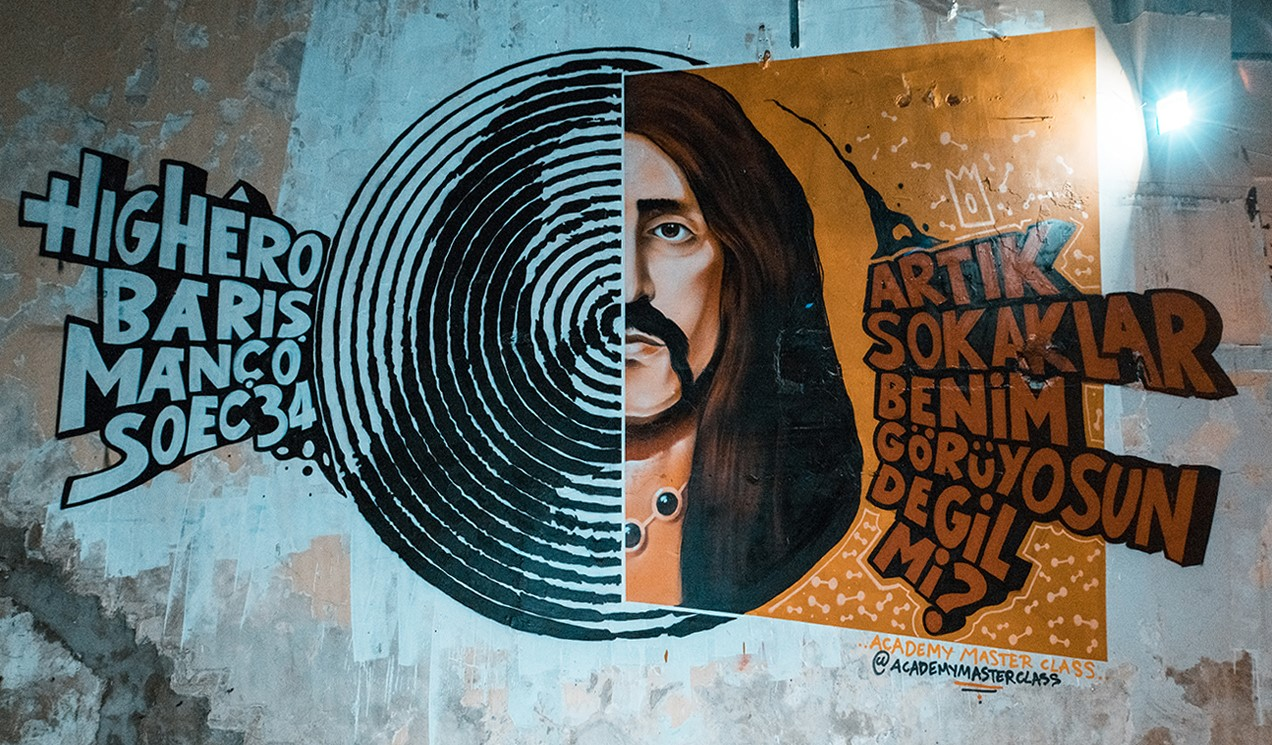
Barış Manço was a Turkish rock musician and one of the founders of the Anatolian rock genre.

Although classifying genres of Turkish music can be problematic, three broad categories can be considered. These are "Turkish folk music", "Turkish art music", and multiple popular music styles. These Popular music styles include arabesque, pop, and Anatolian rock.

The resurging popularity of pop music gave rise to several international Turkish pop stars such as Ajda Pekkan, Sezen Aksu, Erol Evgin, MFÖ, Tarkan, Mustafa Sandal, Sertab Erener, Teoman, Kenan Doğulu, Levent Yüksel and Hande Yener. Internationally acclaimed Turkish jazz and blues musicians and composers include Ahmet Ertegun.

=== Media and cinema ===
Hundreds of television channels, thousands of local and national radio stations, several dozen newspapers, a productive and profitable national cinema and a rapid growth of broadband Internet use constitute a vibrant media industry in Turkey. The majority of the TV audiences are shared among public broadcaster TRT and the network-style channels such as Kanal D, Show TV, ATV and Star TV. The broadcast media have a very high penetration as satellite dishes and cable systems are widely available. The Radio and Television Supreme Council (RTÜK) is the government body overseeing the broadcast media. By circulation, the most popular newspapers are Posta, Hürriyet, Sözcü, Sabah and Habertürk.

Filiz Akın, Fatma Girik, Hülya Koçyiğit, and Türkan Şoray represent their period of Turkish cinema. Turkish directors like Metin Erksan, Nuri Bilge Ceylan, Yılmaz Güney, Zeki Demirkubuz and Ferzan Özpetek won numerous international awards such as the Palme d'Or and Golden Bear. Turkish television dramas are increasingly becoming popular beyond Turkey's borders and are among the country's most vital exports, both in terms of profit and public relations. After sweeping the Middle East's television market over the past decade, Turkish shows have aired in more than a dozen South and Central American countries in 2016. Turkey is today the world's second largest exporter of television series.

The World Press Freedom Index 2026 found serious censorship in Turkey. According to the Committee to Protect Journalists, there are 13 jailed journalists in Turkey.

=== Cuisine ===
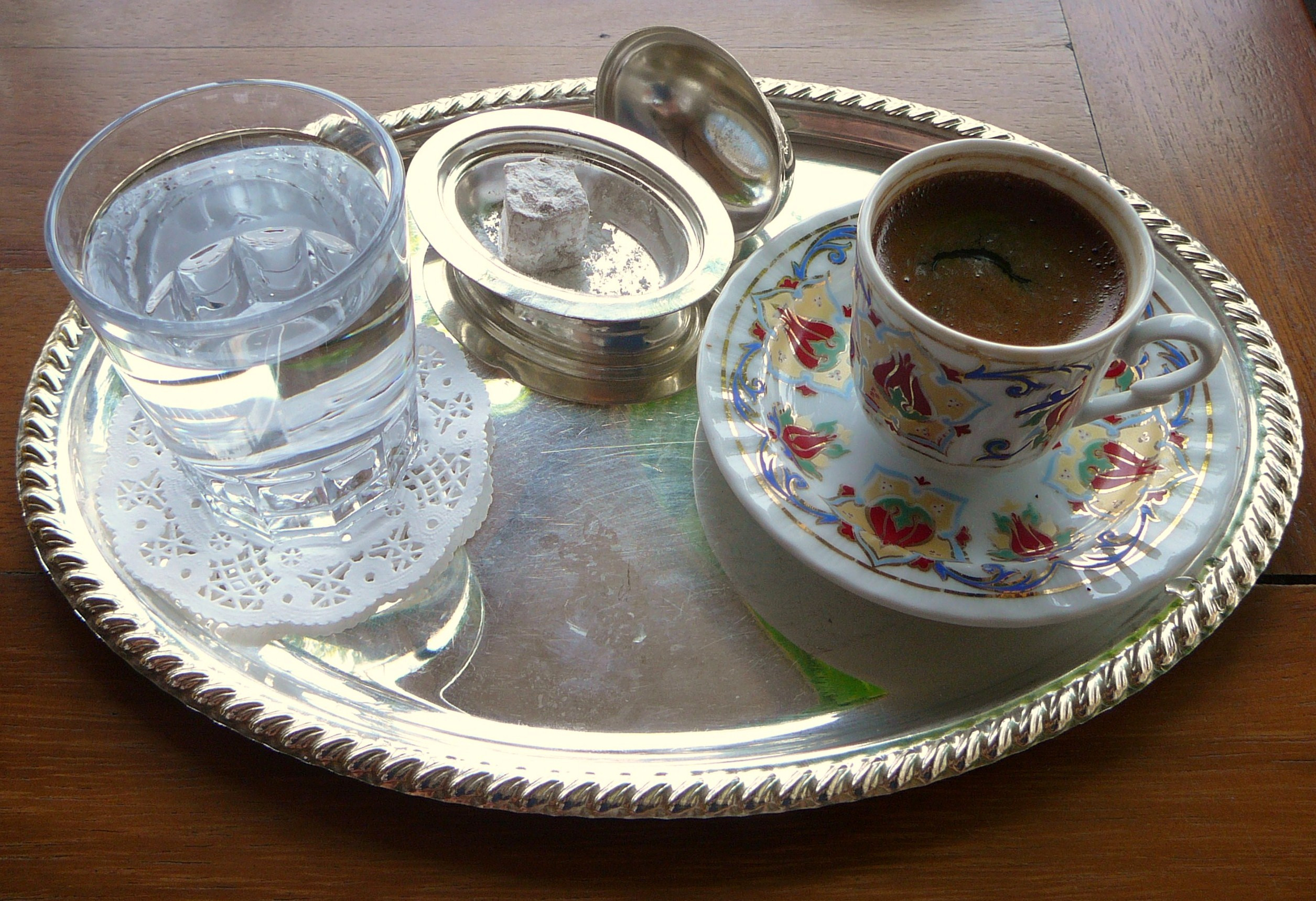
Turkish coffee with Turkish delight. Turkish coffee is a UNESCO-listed intangible cultural heritage of Turks.

Turkey has a diverse and rich cuisine, varying geographically. Turkish cuisine has been influenced by Anatolian, Mediterranean, Iranian, Central Asian, and East Asian cuisines. Turkish and Ottoman cuisine have also influenced others. Dīwān Lughāt al-Turk, from the 11th century, documents "the ancient lineage of much of present-day Turkish cuisine". Güveç, Bulgur, and Börek are some of the earliest recorded examples of Turkish cuisine. Even though kebab as a word comes from Persian, Turkic people had been familiar with using skewers to cook meat. Turkish cuisine can be distinguished by its various kinds of kebabs. Similarly, pilaf dishes were influenced by Turkish cuisine. Further information about cuisine during the Seljuk and Ottoman periods comes from the works of Rumi and Evliya Çelebi. The latter describes "food-related guilds of Istanbul".

Food staples in Turkey include bread and yogurt. Some of bread varieties are lavash and pide (a type of pita bread). Ayran is a drink made of yoghurt. In western parts of Turkey, olive oil is used. Grains include wheat, maize, barley, oats, and millet. Beans, chickpeas, nuts, aubergines, and lamb are some of the commonly used ingredients. Doner kebab, originally from Turkey, is marinated lamb slices cooked vertically. Seafood includes anchovy and others. Dolma varieties and mantı are made by stuffing vegetables or pasta. Sarma is made by rolling edible leaf over the filling. Yahni dishes are vegetable stews. Turkey is one of the countries with the meze tradition. Honey, pekmez, dried fruit, or fruit are used for sweetening. Filo is an originally Turkish dough that is used to make baklava. Turkish delight is a "delicate but gummy jelly".

=== Sports ===
The most popular sport is association football. In addition, basketball, volleyball and tennis have gained media coverage recently. Galatasaray won the UEFA Cup and UEFA Super Cup in 2000. The Turkey national football team won the bronze medal at the 2002 FIFA World Cup, the 2003 FIFA Confederations Cup and UEFA Euro 2008.

Other mainstream sports such as basketball and volleyball are also popular. The men's national basketball team and women's national basketball team have been successful. Anadolu Efes S.K. is the most successful Turkish basketball club in international competitions. Fenerbahçe reached the final of the EuroLeague in three consecutive seasons (2015–2016, 2016–2017 and 2017–2018), becoming the European champions in 2017.

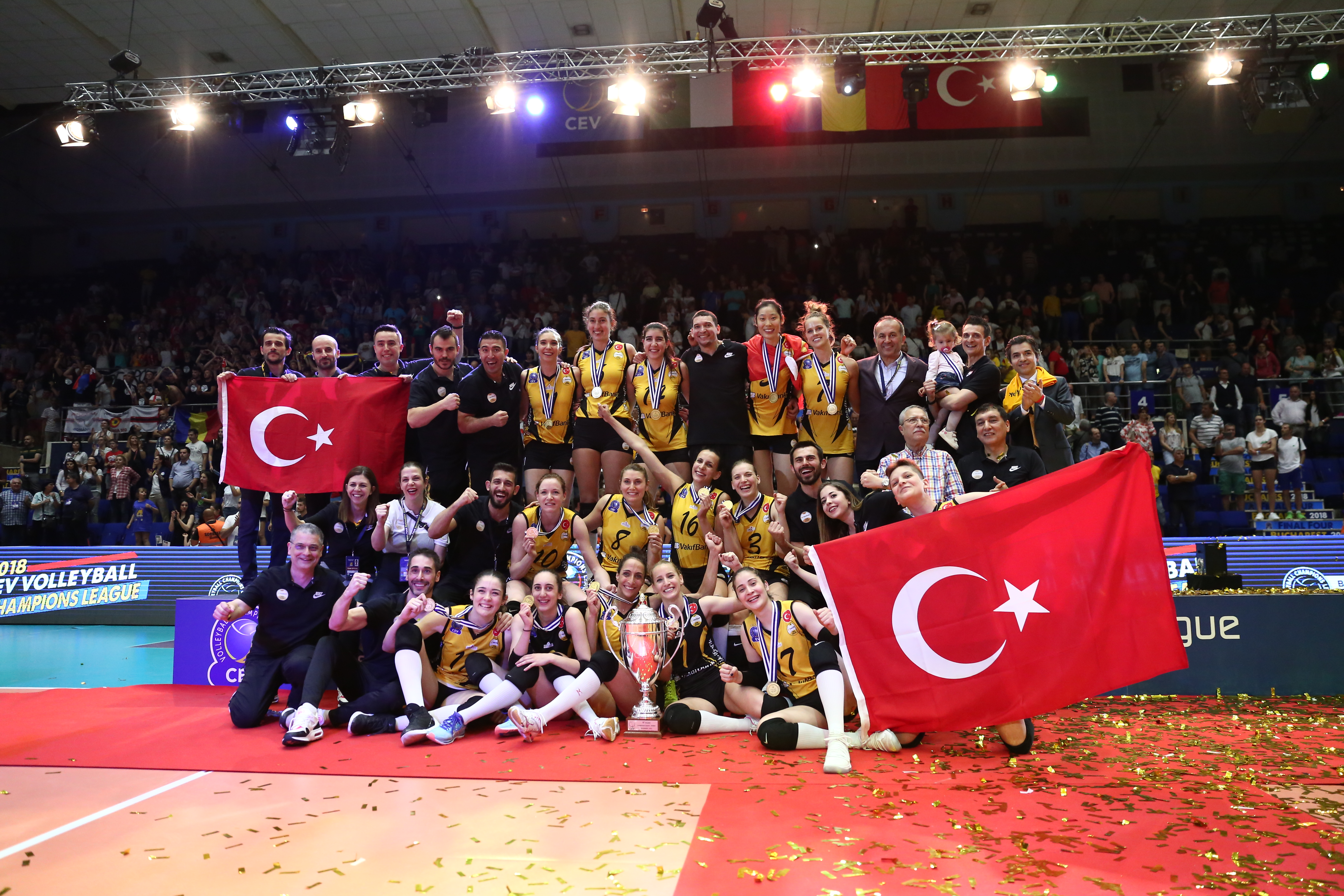
VakıfBank S.K. is one of the best women's volleyball team in the world, having won the FIVB World Championship four times and the CEV Champions Cup six times.

The final of the 2013–14 EuroLeague Women basketball championship was played between two Turkish teams, Galatasaray and Fenerbahçe, and won by Galatasaray. Fenerbahçe won the 2023 FIBA Europe SuperCup Women after two consecutive Euroleague wins in the 2022–23 and 2023–24 seasons.

The women's national volleyball team has won several medals. Women's volleyball clubs, namely VakıfBank S.K., Fenerbahçe and Eczacıbaşı, have won numerous European championship titles and medals.

The traditional national sport of Turkey has been yağlı güreş (oil wrestling) since Ottoman times. Edirne Province has hosted the annual Kırkpınar oil wrestling tournament since 1361, making it the oldest continuously held sporting competition in the world. In the 19th and early 20th centuries, oil wrestling champions such as Koca Yusuf, Nurullah Hasan and Kızılcıklı Mahmut acquired international fame in Europe and North America by winning world heavyweight wrestling championship titles. International wrestling styles governed by FILA such as freestyle wrestling and Greco-Roman wrestling are also popular, with many European, World and Olympic championship titles won by Turkish wrestlers both individually and as a national team.

== See also ==
- Outline of Turkey
