= List of high schools in Turkey =

The following is a list of high schools in Turkey, categorised by province. There are more than 12000 high schools in Turkey, so this list only includes those with Wikipedia articles.

== Adana ==
- Adana Fen Lisesi
- Seyhan Rotary Anadolu Lisesi

== Ankara ==
- Ankara Fen Lisesi
- Ankara (Anadolu) Lisesi
- Ankara Atatürk Anadolu Lisesi
- Ankara Atatürk Lisesi
- Gazi Anadolu Lisesi
- TED Ankara Koleji
- TVF Fine Arts and Sports High School

== Antalya ==
- Aksu Anadolu Öğretmen Lisesi

== Balıkesir ==
- Balıkesir Lisesi

== Bursa ==
- Bursa Anadolu Lisesi
- Bursa Sports High School

== Diyarbakır ==
- Ziya Gökalp Anatolian High School

== Edirne ==
- Beykent Educational Institutions

== Gaziantep ==
- Gaziantep Fen Lisesi

== İstanbul ==
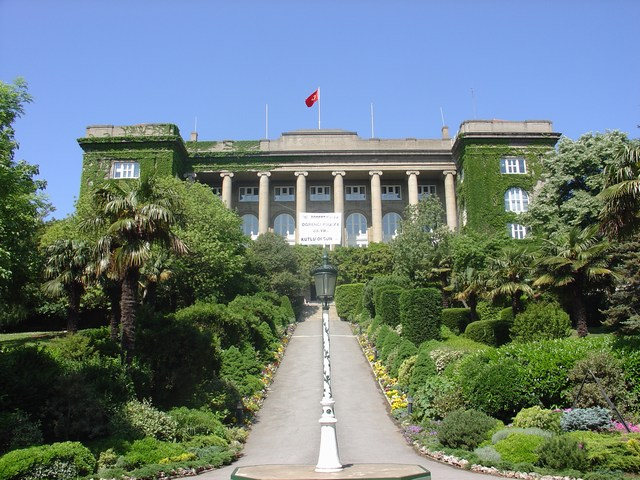
Robert College in Istanbul

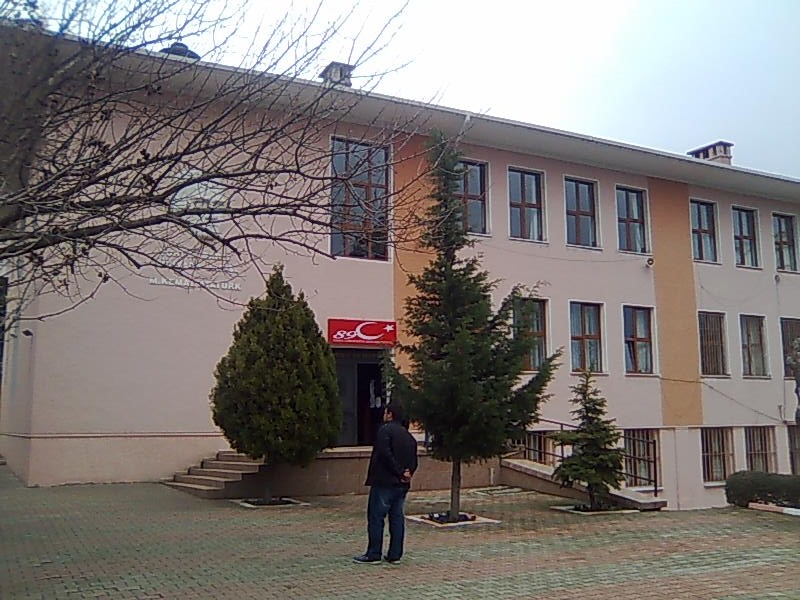
Entrance to the main building of Erenköy Girls High School

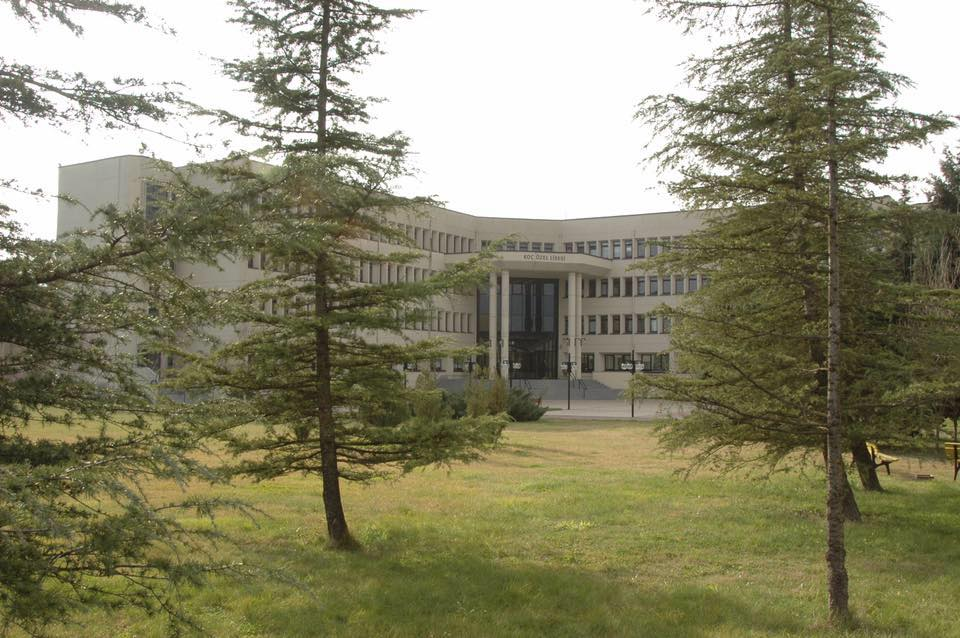
Koç School

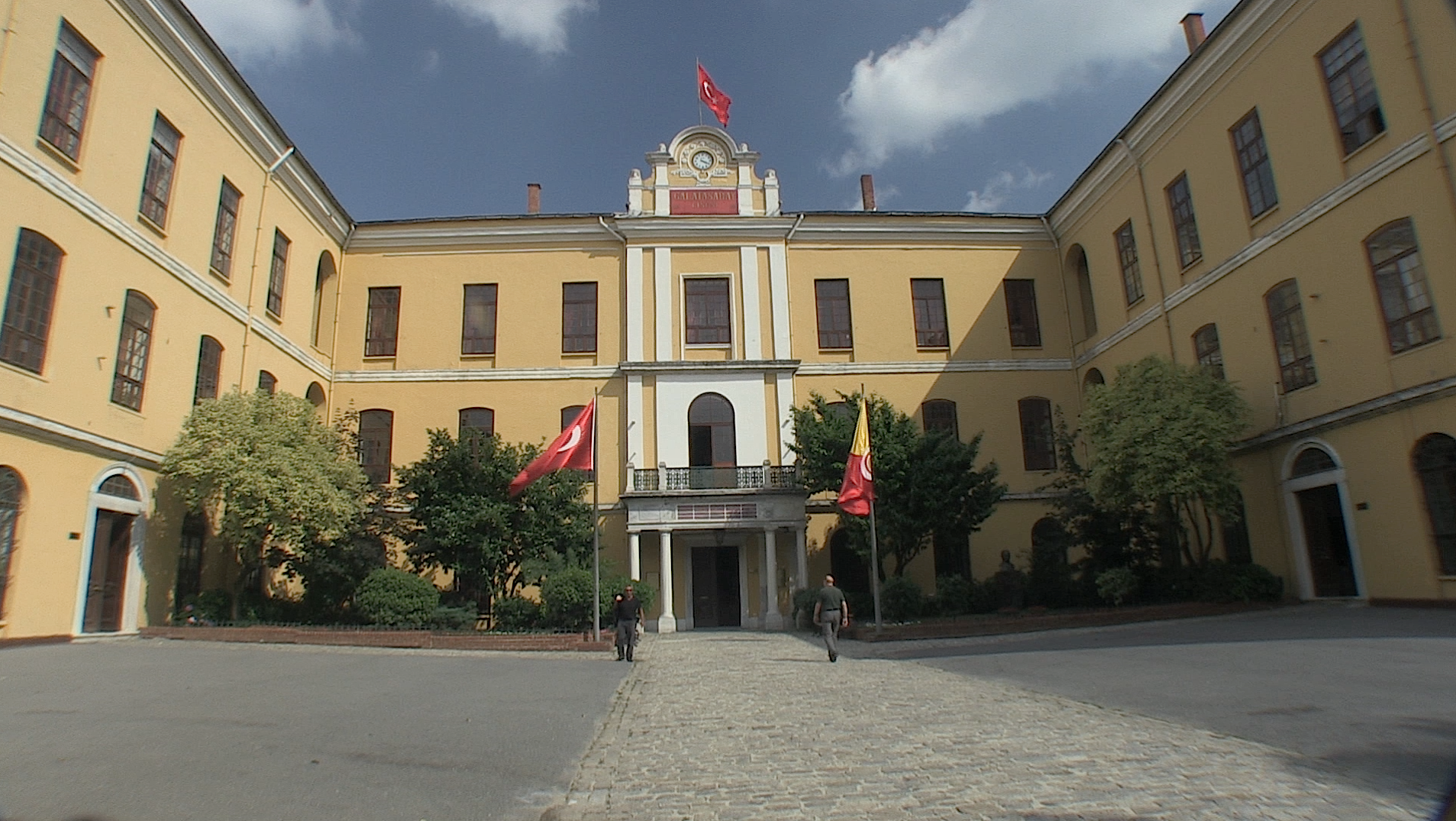
Galatasaray High School

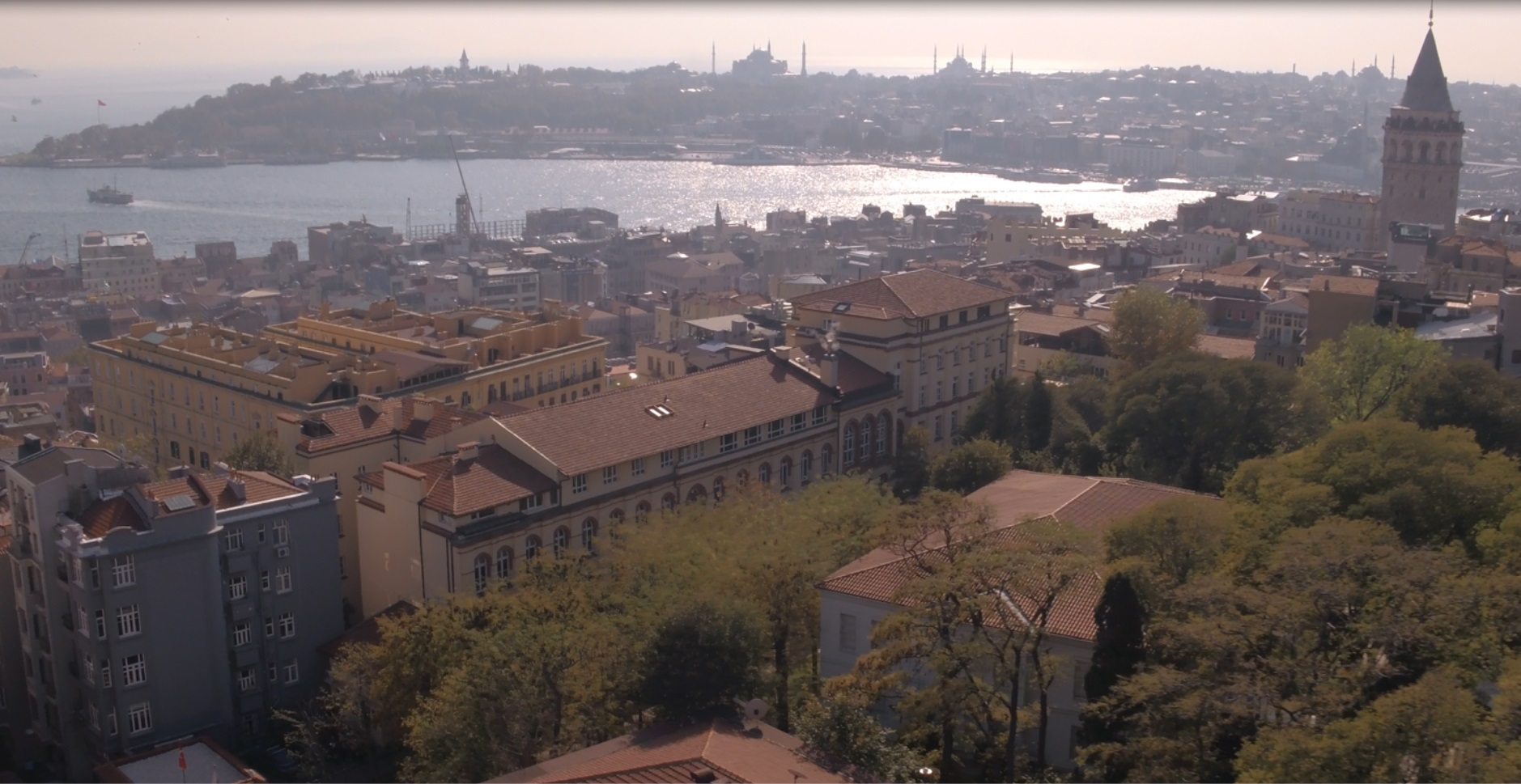
Deutsche Schule Istanbul

- Bahçeşehir College
- Beşiktaş Anadolu Lisesi
- Beşiktaş Atatürk Anadolu Lisesi
- Beykent Educational Institutions
- British International School Istanbul
- Cağaloğlu Anadolu Lisesi
- Deniz Lisesi
- Deutsche Schule Istanbul
- Erenköy Girls High School
- Etiler Anadolu Lisesi
- Galatasaray High School
- Getronagan Ermeni Lisesi
- Hüseyin Avni Sözen Anadolu Lisesi
- Istanbul International Community School
- İstanbul Atatürk Fen Lisesi
- İstanbul Erkek Lisesi
- Kabataş Erkek Lisesi
- Kadıköy Anadolu Lisesi
- Kandilli Anatolian High School for Girls
- Kartal Anadolu Lisesi
- Koç School
- Nişantaşı Anadolu Lisesi
- Private Armenian School of Pangaltı
- Robert College
- St. George's Austrian High School
- Tarabya British Schools
- Üsküdar American Academy
- Vefa Lisesi
- Tuzla Anatolian High School

== İzmir ==
- Bornova Anadolu Lisesi
- İzmir Atatürk Lisesi
- American Collegiate Institute
- Namık Kemal High School
- Özel Ege Lisesi

== Kocaeli ==
- Gölcük Barbaros Hayrettin Lisesi
- TEV İnanç Türkeş Özel Lisesi

== Malatya ==
- Malatya Science High School

== Mersin ==
- İçel Anadolu Lisesi
- Tevfik Sırrı Gür Anadolu Lisesi
- Yusuf Kalkavan Anadolu Lisesi

== Samsun ==
- Samsun Atatürk Anatolian High School

== Tokat ==
- Tokat Arif Nihat Asya Lisesi

== Yalova ==
- Şehit Osman Altınkuyu Anadolu Lisesi
- Yalova Fatih Sultan Mehmet Anadolu Lisesi

== Former schools ==
- Edirne (Adrianople)
  - Bulgarian Men's High School of Adrianople
- Elazig (Mamuret-ul-Aziz)
  - Euphrates College
- Kayseri
  - Talas American College
- Istanbul (Constantinople)
  - Great National School (Megalē tou Genous scholē)
  - Zappeion — Established in 1875, it was a school for girls catering to the Greek population. Johann Strauss, author of "Language and power in the late Ottoman Empire," described it as "prestigious".
- İzmir (Smyrna)
  - American Boys’ School
- Merzifon
  - Anatolia College in Merzifon

== See also ==
- Anatolian High School
- Education in Turkey
- List of missionary schools in Turkey
