= High School Music Contest =

Annual music contest in Turkey

The High School Music Contest (Turkish: Liselerarası Müzik Yarışması), also known as Fizy High School Music Contest for sponsorship reasons, is an annual music contest that is organized in Turkey with the participation of high school students. It started to be held in 1998 by the Kadıköy Municipality Health and Social Solidarity Foundation (Kadıköy Belediyesi Sağlık ve Sosyal Dayanışma Vakfı, KASDAV), and was open to the high schools in Istanbul. In the following years, some award winners started to represent Turkey in various international contests. At the 13th contest which was held in 2010, Eti Crax became the first named sponsor of the event. Starting from the 14th contest in 2011, Vodafone was the main sponsor, and remained so until 2016. Since the 15th contest in 2012, it is open to the participation of high schools from all around the country. The final stages have been held at the Bostancı Show Center in Kadıköy, Istanbul, while the one in 2016 was held at the Volkswagen Arena Istanbul. Fizy became the main sponsor of the event in 2017.

== Contests ==
=== 1st Istanbul High School Music Contest ===
It was held in 1998 at the Bostancı Show Center in Kadıköy, and organised by the Kadıköy Municipality Health and Social Solidarity Foundation (Kadıköy Belediyesi Sağlık ve Sosyal Dayanışma Vakfı, KASDAV). It was only open to the participation of high schools from Istanbul. There were only two award categories, the Pop Arrangement Award and the Pop Performance Award.

=== 2nd Istanbul High School Music Contest ===
After the qualifications that were held between March 8–10, 16 high schools that were selected by the jury members contested in the final stage on March 17. The final results were:

| General contest | Special Barış Manço Prize |
|---|---|
| Kabataş Erkek Lisesi: İstek Özel Acıbadem Lisesi (2nd); Özel Semiha Şakir Lisesi (3rd) | Kabataş Erkek Lisesi |
| Best Female Singer | Best Male Singer |
| İstek Vakfı Özel Acıbadem Lisesi | Kabataş Erkek Lisesi |

=== 3rd Istanbul High School Music Contest ===
It was held between March 21–30, 2000 with the participation of 19 high schools, and had 9 award categories while two of them were special prizes. The final results were:

| Best Singing Performance | Best Orchestra |
|---|---|
| Darüşşafaka Lisesi: Galatasaray Lisesi (2nd); Kenan Evren Anadolu Lisesi (3rd) | Darüşşafaka Lisesi: Kenan Evren Anadolu Lisesi (2nd); Saint Benoît Fransız Lisesi (3rd) |
| Best Female Singer | Best Male Singer |
| Kenan Evren Anadolu Lisesi: İstek Acıbadem Lisesi (2nd); Galatasaray Lisesi (3rd) | Saint Benoît Fransız Lisesi: Kartal Anadolu Lisesi (2nd); Şişli Terakki Lisesi (3rd) |
| Barış Manço Composition Award | Best Stage Performance |
| Darüşşafaka Lisesi: Kenan Evren Anadolu Lisesi (2nd); Saint Benoît Fransız Lisesi (3rd) | Kenan Evren Anadolu Lisesi |
| Special Maltese Song Prize | Special Blue Jean Prize |
| Kabataş Erkek Lisesi | Kartal Anadolu Lisesi |
Special Alem FM Prize
Cağaloğlu Anadolu Lisesi; Haydarpaşa Anadolu Lisesi

=== 4th Istanbul High School Music Contest ===
It was held on March 30, 2001 and was hosted by DJ Füsun Tuncer. The final results were:

| Best Singing Performance | Best Orchestra |
|---|---|
| Haydarpaşa Anadolu Lisesi | ?: Haydarpaşa Anadolu Lisesi |
| Best Female Singer | Best Male Singer |
| ? | ? |
| Barış Manço Composition Award | Best Stage Performance |
| Haydarpaşa Anadolu Lisesi: Galatasaray Lisesi; Ataşehir Lisesi | ? |
| Best Show Dance | Special Malta Prize |
| Beşiktaş Atatürk Anadolu Lisesi | Ümraniye Anadolu Lisesi |
Special Alem FM Prize
Kartal Anadolu Lisesi

=== 5th Istanbul High School Music Contest ===
The qualifications were held between March 19–21 with the participation of 34 high schools, and the finale was held on March 28, 2000 with the participation of 22 high schools. It was hosted by DJ Füsun Tuncer and Ataman Erkul.

=== 6th High School Music Contest ===
The qualifications were held between March 18–19, and the finale was held on March 27, 2003. The final stage which was hosted by DJ Füsun Tuncer and Ataman Erkul witnessed the participation of 36 high schools. The final results were:

| Best Singing Performance | Best Orchestra |
|---|---|
| Maltepe Anadolu Lisesi: Üsküdar Çağrıbey Anadolu Lisesi; Saint Benoît Fransız Lisesi | Üsküdar Çağrıbey Anadolu Lisesi: Dede Korkut Anadolu Lisesi; Emlakbank Ataşehir Lisesi |
| Best Female Singer | Best Male Singer |
| Özel Doğuş Lisesi: Üsküdar Çağrıbey Anadolu Lisesi; Robert Lisesi | ? |
| Barış Manço Composition Award | Best Stage Performance |
| Saint Benoît Fransız Lisesi: Üsküdar Çağrıbey Anadolu Lisesi; Emlakbank Ataşehir Lisesi | Saint Benoît Fransız Lisesi: Şenesenevler Lisesi; Üsküdar Çağrıbey Anadolu Lisesi |
Best Show Dance
Beşiktaş Atatürk Anadolu Lisesi: Göztepe İhsan Kurşunluoğlu Lisesi; Saint Benoît Fransız Lisesi

=== 7th High School Music Contest ===
The final stage was held on March 28, 2004, and consisted of two sections, music and show dance, and saw the participation of 26 and 5 high schools respectively. The final results were:

| Best Singing Performance | Best Orchestra |
|---|---|
| Saint Benoît Fransız Lisesi: Maltepe Anadolu Lisesi; Vefa Lisesi-General Ali Rıza Ersin Lisesi | Saint Benoît Fransız Lisesi: Özel Avrupa Lisesi; Maltepe Anadolu lisesi |
| Best Female Singer | Best Male Singer |
| Saint Benoît Fransız Lisesi: Özel Eyüpoğlu Lisesi; General Ali Rıza Ersin Lisesi | Vefa Lisesi: Kartal Anadolu Lisesi; İzzet Ünver Lisesi |
| Barış Manço Composition Award | Best Stage Performance |
| Kadıköy Anadolu Ticaret ve Meslek Lisesi: Saint Benoît Fransız Lisesi; İzzet Ünver Lisesi-Darüşşafaka Lisesi | Saint Benoît Fransız Lisesi: General Ali Rıza Ersin Lisesi; Özel Avrupa Lisesi |
| Best Show Dance | 16 YSK Best Instrument |
| Kültür Koleji: Maltepe Anadolu Lisesi; Kartal Süleyman Demirel Lisesi | Özel Avrupa Lisesi |
| Special Blue Jean Prize | Special Hey Girl Prize-Most Trendy Girl |
| Bahçeşehir Atatürk Lisesi | Darüşşafaka Lisesi |
| Special Alem FM Prize | Special Jury Prize-Music |
| Maltepe Kadir Has Anadolu Lisesi | Mustafa Saffet Anadolu Lisesi |
Special Jury Prize-Dance
Bahçeşehir Atatürk Lisesi

=== 8th High School Music Contest ===
The qualifications were held between March 19–20, and the finale was held on March 26, 2005. The winner of the Best Singing Performance category represented Turkey at the 1st World High School Music Contest, the winners of the Best Male Singer and the Best Female Singer categories represented Turkey at the International Song Contest in Malta.

| Best Singing Performance | Best Orchestra |
|---|---|
| Dede Korkut Anadolu Lisesi: MEF Lisesi; Beşiktaş Atatürk Anadolu Lisesi | MEF Lisesi: Dede Korkut Lisesi; Kültür Koleji |
| Best Female Singer | Best Male Singer |
| MEF Lisesi: Kenan Evren Anadolu Lisesi; İstek Özel Uluğbey Okulları | Göztepe İhsan Kurşunoğlu Lisesi: Dede Korkut Anadolu Lisesi; Kültür Koleji |
| Best Show Dance | Best Stage Performance |
| Kültür Koleji: Hüseyin Avni Sözen Anadolu Lisesi; General Ali Rıza Ersin Lisesi | MEF Lisesi: Dede Korkut Anadolu Lisesi; Bakırköy Lisesi |
| Best Instrument | Special Alem FM Prize |
| Kültür Koleji: Avrupa Lisesi-Beşiktaş Atatürk Anadolu Lisesi; Ahmet Burhan Lisesi-Kenan Evren Anadolu Lisesi | İstanbul Kadıköy Lisesi |

=== 9th High School Music Contest ===
The qualifications were held between March 24–26, and the finale was held on April 8, 2006. The final results were:

| Best Singing Performance | Best Orchestra |
|---|---|
| Kenan Evren Anadolu Lisesi: Göztepe İhsan Kurşunoğlu Anadolu Lisesi; İstanbul Lisesi | Kenan Evren Anadolu Lisesi: Deutsche Schule Istanbul; FMG Kayseri Anadolu Güzel Sanatlar Lisesi |
| Best Female Singer | Best Male Singer |
| MEF Okulları: Gaziantep Kolej Vakfı Özel Lisesi; Konya Çimento Anadolu Güzel Sanatlar Lisesi | İstanbul Lisesi: Göztepe İhsan Kurşunoğlu Anadolu Lisesi; Galatasaray Lisesi |
| Barış Manço Composition Award | Best Stage Performance |
| Göztepe İhsan Kurşunoğlu Anadolu Lisesi: Özel Darüşşafaka Lisesi; MEF Okulları | Kenan Evren Anadolu Lisesi: Galatasaray Lisesi-Deutsche Schule Istanbul; İstanbul Lisesi |
| Best Instrument (Note: No sorting among the winners.) | Special Jury Prize-Singing Performance |
| Antalya ATSO Anadolu Güzel Sanatlar Lisesi: Vefa Anadolu Lisesi; İzmir Amerika Koleji; FMG Kayseri Anadolu Güzel Sanatlar Lisesi; Göztepe İhsan Kurşunoğlu Anadolu Lisesi | Gaziantep Kolej Vakfı Özel Lisesi |
| Special Jury Prize-Composition | Special FIDOF Prize |
| İzmir Amerikan Koleji | Fatih Davutpaşa Lisesi |
| Special Alem FM Prize | Special Kadıköy Culture and Arts Association Prize (Most Innovative Performance) |
| Antalya ATSO Anadolu Güzel Sanatlar Lisesi | Özel St. Georg Avusturya Lisesi ve Ticaret Okulu |
| Special Gazete Kadıköy Prize (Most Promising Performance) | Most Gentleman Audience Prize |
| HEV Okulları Özel Kemerköy Lisesi | Notre Dame de Sion Fransız Lisesi |

=== 10th High School Music Contest ===
The finale of the contest was held on April 28, 2007 and saw the participation of 36 high schools. The winner of the Best Female Singer category represented Turkey at the 5th Alexandria International Song Festival in Egypt in July 2007, and the winner of the Best Male Singer category represented Turkey at the Amberstar 2007 in Latvia in August 2007. The final results were:

| Best Singing Performance | Best Orchestra |
|---|---|
| Saint Benoît Fransız Lisesi | Saint Benoît Fransız Lisesi |
| Best Female Singer | Best Male Singer |
| Saint Benoît Fransız Lisesi | Kadıköy Anadolu Lisesi |
| Best Composition | Best Instrument |
| Kenan Evren Anadolu Lisesi: Saint Benoît Fransız Lisesi (2nd) | Hüseyin Avni Sözen Anadolu Lisesi: Saint Benoît Fransız Lisesi (2nd) |
| Best Stage Performance | Best Dancing Performance |
| Saint Benoît Fransız Lisesi | Özel Kültür Lisesi: Tarhan Koleji (2nd) |
Special Gazete Kadıköy Prize (Most Promising Performance)
Hüseyin Avni Sözen Anadolu Lisesi

=== 11th High School Music Contest ===
The qualifications were held between March 7–9, and the finale was held on March 29, 2008. 106 high schools participated in the contest while 35 of them made it to the finale. The final results were:

| Best Female Singer | Best Male Singer |
|---|---|
| Özel Kemerköy Lisesi-Saint Benoît Fransız Lisesi | Özel Kadıköy Güzel Sanatlar Lisesi |

=== 12th High School Music Contest ===
With the participation of 132 high schools, the qualifications were held between March 13–15, and the finale was held on April 11, 2009. The final results were:

| Best Singing Performance | Best Orchestra |
|---|---|
| HEV Okulları Kemerköy Lisesi: Hasan-Sabriye Gümüş Anadolu Lisesi (2nd); 50. Yıl Tahran Lisesi (3rd) | Otakçılar Lisesi: Mensucat Santral Anadolu Lisesi (2nd); Özel Saint Joseph Fransiz Lisesi (3rd) |
| Best Female Singer | Best Male Singer |
| Özel Saint Joseph Fransız Lisesi: Galatasaray Lisesi (2nd); HEV Okulları Kemerköy Lisesi-Özel Moda Mimar Sinan Güzel Sanatlar Lisesi (3rd) | Fatin Rüştü Zorlu Anadolu Lisesi: Prof. Faik Somer Anadolu Lisesi-Özel Ataşehir Adıgüzel Güzel Sanatlar Lisesi (2nd); Özel İtalyan Lisesi (3rd) |
| Best Composition | Best Instrument |
| Özel Moda Mimar Sinan Güzel Sanatlar Lisesi: Üsküdar Cumhuriyet Lisesi (2nd); Galatasaray Lisesi-Özel Saint Joseph Fransız Lisesi (3rd) | Otakçılar Lisesi: Mensucat Santral Anadolu Lisesi-Bateri (2nd); Mensucat Santral Anadolu Lisesi-Gitar (3rd) |
| Best Stage Show | Best Arrangement |
| Semiha Şakir Anadolu Lisesi: Florya Tevfik Ercan Anadolu Lisesi (2nd); Özel Saint Benoit Fransız Lisesi (3rd) | Selimpaşa Atatürk Anadolu Lisesi: Özel Darüşşafaka Lisesi (2nd); Prof. Faik Somer Anadolu Lisesi (3rd); Mensucat Santral Anadolu Lisesi-Gitar (3rd) |
| Istanbul Bilgi University Outstanding Achievement Prize | Most Supportive Audience |
| Fatin Rüştü Zorlu Anadolu Lisesi | Özdemir Sabancı Emirgan Lisesi |
| Special Gazete Kadıköy Prize (Most Promising Performance) | Special Kadıköy Culture-Arts Association Prize (Most Innovative Performance) |
| Erenköy Kız Lisesi | İTO Anadolu Ticaret Meslek Lisesi |
| FIDOF Youth Prize | International Special Achievement Prize |
| Davutpaşa Lisesi | Fatin Rüştü Zorlu Anadolu Lisesi |
| Special Press Prize-Person | Special Press Prize-Band |
| Özel Moda Mimar Sinan Güzel Sanatlar Lisesi | Özel Moda Mimar Sinan Güzel Sanatlar Lisesi |
| Davutpaşa Lisesi | Fatin Rüştü Zorlu Anadolu Lisesi |
| Special Jury Prize-Person | Special Jury Prize-Band |
| Notre Dame de Sion Fransız Lisesi | Özel Kıraç Lisesi |

=== 13th High School Music Contest ===
The qualifications were held between March 6–7, and the finale was held on March 27, 2010. The event was labeled as the 13th Eti Crax High School Music Contest (13. Eti Crax Liselerarası Müzik Yarışması) for sponsorship reasons. The final results were:

| Best Singing Performance | Best Orchestra |
|---|---|
| Oğuz Canpolat Anadolu Lisesi | Cağaloğlu Anadolu Lisesi |
| Best Female Singer | Best Male Singer |
| Bahçelievler Anadolu Lisesi | Özel İtalyan Lisesi |
| Best Composition | Best Instrument |
| Özel İtalyan Lisesi | Akşemsettin Anadolu Lisesi |
| Best Stage Performance | Best Arrangement |
| Özel İtalyan Lisesi | Oğuz Canpolat Anadolu Lisesi |
| Istanbul Bilgi University Outstanding Achievement Prize | Special MMA Prize |
| Özel İtalyan Lisesi-Prof. Dr. Mümtaz Turhan Sosyal Bilimler Lisesi | Akşemsettin Anadolu Lisesi |

=== 14th High School Music Contest ===
The qualifications, which saw the participation of 131 high schools, were held between March 12–13, and the finale was held on April 27, 2011. Starting from this event, Vodafone became the main sponsor of the contest. After the finale, in which 33 high schools participated, the winners of the Best Singing Performance, the Best Male Singer and the Best Female Singer categories took part in various other music contests. The final results were:

| Best Singing Performance | Best Orchestra |
|---|---|
| Şişli Lisesi | Oğuz Canpolat Lisesi |
| Best Female Singer | Best Male Singer |
| MEF Lisesi | Şişli Lisesi |
| Best Composition | Best Instrument |
| Özel Doğan Anadolu Lisesi | Türk Kızılayı Kartal Anadolu Lisesi |
| Best Stage Show | Special Press Prize-Person |
| Bahçelievler Lisesi | Türk Kızılayı Kartal Anadolu Lisesi |
Special Press Prize-Band
Küçükçekmece Anadolu Lisesi

=== 15th High School Music Contest ===
The event was named after Vodafone Freezone, for sponsorship reasons, and for the first time high schools out of Istanbul joined the contest. The qualifications in İzmir were held between March 10–11 with the participation of 59 high schools, the qualifications in Ankara on March 17 with the participation of 56 high schools, and the qualifications in Istanbul between March 23–25 with the participation of 159 high schools. The finale was held on April 14, at the Bostancı Show Center. The final results were:

| Best Singing Performance | Best Orchestra |
|---|---|
| Beyoğlu Özel Sankt George Avusturya Lisesi: Özel Mimar Sinan Güzel Sanatlar Lisesi (2nd); Mimar Sinan Özel Anadolu Lisesi (3rd) | Deutsche Schule Istanbul: Oğuz Canpolat Lisesi (2nd); Özel Darüşşafaka Lisesi (3rd) |
| Best Female Singer | Best Male Singer |
| Özel Mimar Sinan Güzel Sanatlar Lisesi: Özel İzmir Amerikan Koleji (2nd); Atatürk Anadolu Lisesi (3rd) | Beyoğlu Özel Sankt George Avusturya Lisesi: Mimar Sinan Özel Anadolu Lisesi (2nd); Tınaztepe Lisesi (3rd) |
| Best Composition | Best Instrument |
| Özel İzmir Amerikan Koleji: Oğuz Canpolat Lisesi (2nd); Handan Hayrettin Yelkikanat Teknik ve Endüstri Meslek Lisesi (3rd) | Mithatpaşa Kız Teknik ve Meslek Lisesi: Oğuz Canpolat Lisesi (2nd); Buca DMO Çok Programlı Lisesi (3rd) |
| Best Stage Performance | Okan University Outstanding Achievement Prize |
| Çatalca Anadolu Lisesi: Beyoğlu Özel Sankt Georg Avusturya Lisesi (2nd); Atatürk Anadolu Lisesi (3rd) | Buca DMO Çok Programlı Lisesi: Tınaztepe Lisesi (2nd); Özel Darüşşafaka Lisesi (3rd) |
| Golden Drum Stick | Twitter Prize |
| Özel Moda Mimar Sinan Anadolu Güzel Sanatlar Lisesi | Özel Darüşşafaka Lisesi |
| Special Jury Prize-Person | Special Jury Prize-Band |
| Özel MEF Lisesi | Buca DMO Çok Programlı Lisesi |
| FIDOF Gençlik Ödülü | Special Press Prize-Person |
| Beyoğlu Özel Sankt Georg Avusturya Lisesi | Mimar Sinan Özel Anadolu Lisesi |
Special Press Prize-Band
Deutsche Schule Istanbul

=== 16th High School Music Contest ===
The event was organized by Vodafone Freezone and named after it. For the first time, the competition was open to the participation of the high schools from all around Turkey. The qualifications were held in Antalya, İzmir, Ankara, Gaziantep, Istanbul and Bursa respectively in February, March and April with the participation of 424 high schools from 53 provinces of Turkey. The finale was held on April 27, 2013 and saw 23 high schools competing, including the winner of the 1st Northern Cyprus High School Music Contest. The final results were:

| Best Singing Performance | Best Orchestra |
|---|---|
| Büyükçekmece Atatürk Anadolu Lisesi: Zeki Müren Güzel Sanatlar ve Spor Lisesi (2nd); Tarsus Amerikan Koleji (3rd) | Salihli Anadolu Lisesi: Övgü Terzibaşıoğlu Anadolu Lisesi (2nd); Namık Kemal Lisesi (3rd) |
| Best Female Singer | Best Male Singer |
| Kartal Süleyman Demirel Lisesi: TED Samsun Koleji (2nd); Salihli Anadolu Lisesi (3rd) | Büyükçekmece Atatürk Anadolu Lisesi: Nevvar-Salih İşgören Denizcilik Anadolu ve Teknik Lisesi (2nd); Namık Kemal Lisesi (3rd) |
| Best Composition | Best Instrument |
| Bingül Erdem Lisesi: Özel İzmir Amerikan Koleji (2nd); Tarsus Amerikan Koleji (3rd) | Tuna Anadolu Sağlık Meslek Lisesi: Özel Irmak Okulları (2nd); Nevvar-Salih İşgören Denizcilik Anadolu ve Teknik Lisesi (3rd) |
| Best Stage Performance | Audience Prize |
| Samsun TED Koleji-Beyoğlu Özel Sankt Georg Avusturya Lisesi: Tuna Anadolu Sağlık Meslek Lisesi (2nd); Gaziantep Kolej Vakfı Özel Lisesi (3rd) | Namık Kemal Lisesi |
| FIDOF Youth Prize | Youth Magazines Prize-Person |
| Gaziantep Kolej Vakfı Özel Lisesi | Samsun TED Koleji |
| Youth Magazines Prize-Band | Special Jury Prize-Person |
| Beyoğlu Özel Sankt Georg Avusturya Lisesi | Bursa Anadolu Erkek Lisesi |
Special Jury Prize-Band
Nevvar-Salih İşgören Denizcilik Anadolu ve Teknik Lisesi

=== 17th High School Music Contest ===
It was organised under Vodafone Freezone's name. The qualifications were held in Ankara, Adana, Istanbul and İzmir with the participation of 378 high schools from 45 provinces. 23 high schools contested in the finale on April 26, 2014. The final results were:

| Best Singing Performance | Best Orchestra |
|---|---|
| Ağrı Güzel Sanatlar Lisesi: Hasan Şadoğlu Kız Teknik ve Meslek Lisesi (2nd); İMKB Tavşanlı Anadolu Öğretmen (3rd) | Silahlı Kuvvetler Bando Okulları Komutanlığı: Şişli Terakki Lisesi (2nd); Büyük Kolej (3rd) |
| Best Female Singer | Best Male Singer |
| Bursa Anadolu Kız Lisesi: Bostancı Doğa Koleji-Oğuz Canpolat Lisesi (2nd); MEF Lisesi-Şişli Terakki Lisesi (3rd) | Hasan Şadoğlu Kız Teknik ve Meslek Lisesi: Ağrı Güzel Sanatlar Lisesi (2nd); Özel Işıkkent Anadolu Lisesi-Turgutreis Anadolu Lisesi (3rd) |
| Best Composition | Best Instrument |
| Özel Atayurt Anadolu/Fen Lisesi: Oğuz Canpolat Lisesi (2nd); Özel İzmir Amerikan Koleji (3rd) | Övgü Terzibaşıoğlu Anadolu Lisesi: Güzelyurt Kurtuluş Lisesi-Kadıköy Anadolu Lisesi (2nd); Ağrı Güzel Sanatlar Lisesi (3rd) |
| Best Stage Performance | Audience Prize |
| Rize Türk Telekom Güzel Sanatlar Lisesi: Mehmet Çelikel Lisesi (2nd); Prof. Dr. Orhan Oğuz Anadolu Lisesi (3rd) | Namık Kemal Lisesi |
| Special FIDOF Prize | Youth Magazines Prize-Person |
| Avni Akyol Güzel Sanatlar Lisesi | Hasan Şadoğlu Kız Teknik ve Meslek Lisesi |
| Youth Magazines Prize-Band | Special Jury Prize-Person |
| Büyük Kolej | Erdemir Güzel Sanatlar Lisesi |
Special Jury Prize-Band
Özel Işıkkent Anadolu Lisesi

=== 18th High School Music Contest ===
It was organised by Vodafone Freezone and named after it. The qualifications were held in Ankara, Istanbul and İzmir. For the first time, the winners of high school music contest in Germany, Italy, Lebanon, Macedonia and Malta participated and competed in a different category. The finale was held on May 9 and the results were:

| Best Singing Performance | Best Orchestra |
|---|---|
| Gaziantep Kolej Vakfı Özel Lisesi: Şişli Terakki Lisesi (2nd); İstanbul Özel Açı Lisesi (3rd) | Özel Moda Mimar Sinan Güzel Sanatlar Lisesi: Oğuz Canpolat Lisesi (2nd); Ankara Atatürk Anadolu Lisesi (3rd) |
| Best Female Singer | Best Male Singer |
| Özel MEF Lisesi: İstanbul Kadıköy Lisesi; Oğuz Canpolat Anadolu Lisesi | Samsun Özel Ses Okulları: Özel Açı Lisesi (2nd); Özel Moda Mimar Sinan Güzel Sanatlar Lisesi (3rd) |
| Best Composition | Best Instrument |
| Ankara Atatürk Anadolu Lisesi: Ankara Celal Yardımcı Anadolu Lisesi (2nd); Özel İzmir Amerikan Koleji (3rd) | Şehit Erkan Özcan Anadolu Lisesi-Özel İstek Semiha Şakir Anadolu Lisesi: Özel Moda Mimar Sinan Güzel Sanatlar Lisesi (2nd); Özel Çekmeköy Doğa Anadolu Lisesi (3rd) |
| Best Stage Show | Special Press Prize-Person |
| Alparslan Anadolu Lisesi: Şişli Terakki Lisesi (2nd); KKTC Doğu Akdeniz Doğa Koleji-Oğuz Canpolat Anadolu Lisesi (3) | Şehit Erkan Özcan Anadolu Lisesi |
| Special Press Prize-Band | Special Youth Magazines Prize-Person |
| Prof. Dr Orhan Oğuz Anadolu Lisesi | Özel İstek Semiha Şakir Anadolu Lisesi-Prof Dr. Orhan Oğuz Anadolu Lisesi |
| Special Youth Magazines Prize-Band | Special Jury Prize-Person |
| Ankara Atatürk Anadolu Lisesi | Amasya Güzel Sanatlar Lisesi |
| Special Jury Prize-Band | International Contest Special Jury Prize |
| Karaman Güzel Sanatlar Lisesi | Italy |
International Contest Best Performance
Lebanon-International College

=== 19th High School Music Contest ===
It was organised under Vodafone Freezone's name, the main sponsor of the event. The qualifications were held in Ankara, Istanbul and İzmir, in which 415 high schools from 53 provinces participated. The finale was held on April 29, 2016 with the participation of 30 high schools. Participants from another countries competed in a separate category in the finale. Volkswagen Arena Istanbul hosted the final for the first and only time. The final results were:

| Best Singing Performance | Best Orchestra |
|---|---|
| Özel Moda Mimar Sinan Güzel Sanatlar Lisesi: Şişli Terakki Lisesi (2nd); Galatasaray Lisesi-Oğuz Canpolat Anadolu Lisesi (3rd) | Oğuz Canpolat Anadolu Lisesi: Özel Moda Mimar Sinan Güzel Sanatlar Lisesi (2nd); Saint Benoît Fransız Lisesi (3rd) |
| Best Female Singer | Best Male Singer |
| Özel Değişim Anadolu Lisesi: Diyarbakır İMKB Fen Lisesi (2nd); Balçova Anadolu Lisesi-Özel Hatay Koleji (3rd) | İstek Bilge Kağan Anadolu Lisesi: Özel Moda Mimar Sinan Güzel Sanatlar Lisesi (2nd); İzmir Büyükçiğili Özel Türk Anadolu Lisesi-Amasya Güzel Sanatlar Lisesi (3rd) |
| Best Composition | Best Instrument |
| Özel Atayurt Anadolu/Fen Lisesi: Oğuz Canpolat Lisesi (2nd); Özel İzmir Amerikan Koleji (3rd) | Oğuz Canpolat Anadolu Lisesi: Özel İzmir Amerikan Koleji (2nd); Tarsus Amerikan Koleji (3rd) |
| Best Stage Performance | Istanbul Bilgi University Outstanding Achievement Prize |
| Giresun Güzel Sanatlar Lisesi: Özel Moda Mimar Sinan Güzel Sanatlar Lisesi (2nd); Rize Türk Telekom Güzel Sanatlar Lisesi (3rd) | Haluk Ündeğer Anadolu Lisesi: Galatasaray Lisesi (2nd) |
| Special Youth Magazines Prize | Special Press Prize-Best Singer |
| Edirne Süleyman Demirel Fen Lisesi: Kuzeykent Anadolu Lisesi (2nd); Kastamonu Güzel Sanatlar Lisesi (3rd) | Diyarbakır İMKB Fen Lisesi |
| Special Contest Jury Prize | Best Stage Performance |
| Malta | Iceland - Menntaskolinn Vio Hamrahlio Hamrahlid College |
Special Jury Prize-Band
Özel Işıkkent Anadolu Lisesi

=== 20th High School Music Contest ===
It was organised under Fizy's name, the main sponsor of the event. The qualifications in Istanbul were held between March 24–25, in Ankara on March 31, and in İzmir on April 7 with the participation of 465 high schools from 49 provinces. The finale was held in the Bostancı Show Center on April 22 with the participation of 34 high schools. The final results were:

| Best Singing Performance | Best Orchestra |
|---|---|
| Galatasaray Lisesi: Abdülkadir Eriş Güzel Sanatlar Lisesi (2nd); Özel Tevfik Fikret Anadolu Lisesi (3rd) | Oğuz Canpolat Anadolu Lisesi: Saint Benoît Fransız Lisesi (2nd); Özel TAKEV Anadolu ve Fen Lisesi (3rd) |
| Best Female Singer | Best Male Singer |
| Çelebi Mehmet Anadolu Lisesi / Dörtçelik Mesleki ve Teknik Anadolu Lisesi: Deutsche Schule Istanbul (2nd); Tokat Güzel Sanatlar Lisesi (3rd); Ankara Özel Tevfik Fikret Anadolu Lisesi (3rd) | Galatasaray Lisesi: İzmir Anadolu Lisesi (2nd); Özel Moda Mimar Sinan Anadolu Güzel Sanatlar Lisesi (3rd) |
| Best Stage Performance | Best Instrument |
| Bursa Ahmet Erdem Anadolu Lisesi: ATSO Güzel Sanatlar Lisesi (2nd); Galatasaray Lisesi (3rd) | Oğuz Canpolat Anadolu Lisesi: Emel Mustafa Uşaklı Anadolu Lisesi/Özel Değişim Anadolu Lisesi (2nd); Özel Yakacık Doğa Anadolu Lisesi/Özel Kurtköy Doğa Anadolu Lisesi (3rd) |
| BİP Promising Young Talents Prize | Okan University Outstanding Achievement Prize |
| Alparslan Anadolu Lisesi: Ayten Kemal Akınal Anadolu Lisesi/Mustafa Gürbüz Necat Bayel Anadolu Lisesi (2nd); Eskişehir Fatih Anadolu Lisesi (3rd) | Tokat Güzel Sanatlar Lisesi: Abdülkadir Eriş Güzel Sanatlar Lisesi (2nd); Özel Yakacık Doğa Anadolu Lisesi/Özel Kurtköy Doğa Anadolu Lisesi (3rd) |
| Press Prize-Person | Press Prize-Band |
| Özel TAKEV Anadolu ve Fen Lisesi | Adnan Menderes Anadolu Lisesi/Karesi Temel Lisesi |
| Youth Magazines Prize-Person | Youth Magazines Prize-Band |
| Yüksel Yalova Güzel Sanatlar Lisesi | Ardeşen Kanuni Anadolu Lisesi/Işıklı Mesleki ve Teknik Anadolu Lisesi |
| Special Jury Prize-Person | Special Jury Prize-Band |
| Bursa Ahmet Erdem Anadolu Lisesi | Manisa Güzel Sanatlar Lisesi |
| fizy Encouragement Prize | Music Room Prize |
| Yavuz Sultan Selim Anadolu Lisesi | Oğuz Canpolat Anadolu Lisesi: Galatasaray Lisesi (2nd) |

=== 21st High School Music Contest ===
The event was organised by Fizy, and the qualifications in Istanbul were held between March 23–24, in Ankara between March 30–31, and in İzmir between April 6–7 with the participation of 557 high schools from 49 provinces. The finale, during which Nükhet Duru received the Legend of Pop Award, was held in the Bostancı Show Center on April 28 with the participation of 35 high schools. The final results were:

| Best Singing Performance | Fulltrip Best Orchestra |
|---|---|
| Safranbolu İMKB Güzel Sanatlar Lisesi: Özel Çevre Koleji (2nd); Kadıköy Anadolu Lisesi ve Çorlu İMKB Fen Lisesi / Tekirdağ Anadolu Lisesi (3rd) | Oğuz Canpolat Anadolu Lisesi: Özel Adıgüzel Güzel Sanatlar Lisesi ve Galatasaray Lisesi (2nd); Özel Tevfik Fikret Anadolu Lisesi (3rd) |
| TV+ Best Female Singer | Yaani Best Male Singer |
| Deutsche Schule Istanbul: Çelebi Mehmet Anadolu Lisesi (2nd); Ayrancı Anadolu Lisesi ve Ankara Güzel Sanatlar Lisesi (3rd) | Balçova Anadolu Lisesi: Özel Çevre Koleji (2nd); Bursa Sınav Koleji Anadolu ve Fen Lisesi - Gürlek-Nakipoğlu Anadolu Lisesi (3rd) |
| Dergilik Best Stage Performance | BiP Best Instrument Performance |
| Alparslan Anadolu Lisesi / Özel Teknofen Koleji Anadolu Lisesi: Özel Bornova Okyanus Anadolu Lisesi (2nd); Özel Moda Mimar Sinan Anadolu Güzel Sanatlar Lisesi / Özel Kadıköy Akşam Lisesi (3rd) | Trabzon Yavuz Sultan Selim Anadolu Lisesi: Çorlu İMKB Fen Lisesi / Tekirdağ Anadolu Lisesi (2nd); Gürlek-Nakipoğlu Anadolu Lisesi (3rd) |
| Okan University Outstanding Achievement Prize | LIFECELL Most Dynamic Band Prize |
| Trabzon Yavuz Sultan Selim Anadolu Lisesi: İstanbul Özel Adıgüzel Güzel Sanatlar Lisesi (2nd); Oğuz Canpolat Anadolu Lisesi (3rd) | Kadıköy Anadolu Lisesi |
| Special LIFEBOX Prize (Promising Instrumentalist) | Special Barış Manço Prize |
| Oğuz Canpolat Anadolu Lisesi | Kepirtepe Anadolu Lisesi / Lüleburgaz Atatürk Anadolu Lisesi |
| Special Press Prize-Best Singer | Special Press Prize-Best Band |
| İstanbul Özel Şafak Koleji Mesleki ve Teknik Anadolu Lisesi | Ordu Anadolu Lisesi |
Special Jury Prize-Band
| Saint Benoît Fransız Lisesi | Özel İzmir Amerikan Koleji |

=== 22nd High School Music Contest ===
It was organised under Fizy's name, and the qualifications in Istanbul were held between March 22–24, in Ankara between March 29–30, and in İzmir between April 5–6 with the participation of 636 high schools from 55 provinces. The finale was held in the Bostancı Show Center on April 27 with the participation of 31 high schools. The final results were:

| Best Singing Performance | Best Orchestra Performance |
|---|---|
| Özel Moda Mimar Sinan Güzel Sanatlar Anadolu Lisesi & Özel Kadıköy Akşam Lisesi: Galatasaray Lisesi (2nd); Eyüboğlu Eğitim Kurumları ve Özel Tevfik Fikret Anadolu Lisesi (3rd) | Özel TAKEV Anadolu ve Fen Lisesi: Saint Benoît Fransız Lisesi / Oğuzcan Polat Anadolu Lisesi (2nd); TED Özel Atakent Koleji (3rd) |
| Best Stage Performance | Best Instrument Performance |
| Eyüboğlu Eğitim Kurumları: Özel Bornova Okyanus Anadolu Lisesi & Özel Mavişehir Okyanus Lisesi (2nd); Özel TAKEV Anadolu ve Fen Lisesi (3rd) | Özel Moda Mimar Sinan Güzel Sanatlar Anadolu Lisesi & Özel Kadıköy Akşam Lisesi: ATSO Güzel Sanatlar Lisesi / Adnan Menderes Anadolu Lisesi (2nd); Şair Abay Konanbay Anadolu Lisesi (3rd) |
| Best Female Singer | Best Male Singer |
| Çelebi Mehmet Anadolu Lisesi & Nilüfer Sınav Temel Lisesi: Avcılar Süleyman Nazif Anadolu Lisesi / Özel Bornova Okyanus Anadolu Lisesi & Özel Mavişehir Okyanus Lisesi (2nd); Fatin Rüştü Zorlu Anadolu Lisesi & 50. Yıl Cumhuriyet Feridun Tümer Meslek Lisesi (3rd) | Galatasaray Lisesi: Kağıthane Anadolu Lisesi / Trabzon Yavuz Sultan Selim Anadolu Lisesi (2nd); Bursa Özlüce Anadolu Lisesi (3rd) |
| Okan University Outstanding Achievement Prize | Şehrin Sesi Prize |
| Gaziantep Ticaret Odası Güzel Sanatlar Lisesi: Trabzon Yavuz Sultan Selim Anadolu Lisesi (2nd); Şair Abay Konanbay Anadolu Lisesi (3rd) | Adana Anadolu Lisesi |
| Special Press Prize-Best Singer | Special Press Prize-Best Band |
| Özel TAKEV Anadolu ve Fen Lisesi | Avcılar Süleyman Nazif Anadolu Lisesi |
| Special Jury Prize-Male | Special Jury Prize-Female |
| Eyüboğlu Eğitim Kurumları | Ankara Özel Tevfik Fikret Anadolu Lisesi |
Special Jury Prize-Person
Sakarya Cevat Ayhan Anadolu Lisesi
