= Burak Tozkoparan =

Turkish actor and musician (born 1992)

- Born: 14 November 1992 (age 33); Istanbul, Turkey
- Occupations: Actor, musician
- Years active: 2014–present

Burak Tozkoparan (born 14 November 1992) is a Turkish actor and musician. He is well known for his roles in the drama series Paramparça as Ozan Gürpınar and in Ateş Kuşları as Barbar.

== Life and career ==
His family are of Laz descent, from Rize. On 2 April 2011, he won the Best Drummer award at the 14th High School Music Contest held at Bostancı Show Center. After representing the Turkish Kızılayı Kartal Anatolian High School at the contest, he enrolled in Okan University, pursuing a degree in cinema and television studies. Meanwhile, he continued his career as a musician, as a member of different bands. For a while, together with Olcayto Ahmet Tuğsuz he formed the band Pervane, in which he served as the drummer. He is the vocalist of the "ODYO" music group.

His television debut came with a role in Star TV's drama series Paramparça as Ozan Gürpınar. He later went on to star in Kırgın Çiçekler, "Tek Yürek" and Menajerimi Ara, which was an adaptation of a French series. He played in the comedy drama series "Gençliğim Eyvah" and went on to bag a prominent role as part of the lead cast, in the period drama Destan. In 2022, he was cast in the lead role of Barbaros opposite İlayda Alişan in the drama series "Ateş Kuşları". He later starred as Cihan Şansalan in the 2024 drama series Siyah Kalp as one of the main leads.

He also made his cinematic debut with a role in Gönenç Uyanık's 2016 movie Hesapta Aşk, in which he portrayed the character of Mert. Alongside Hayal Köseoğlu, he appeared in the film Sesinde Aşk Var.

== Filmography ==
Film
Year	Title	Role
2016	Hesapta Aşk	Mert
2019	Sesinde Aşk Var	Rüzgar
2024	Intoxicated by Love	Sultan Walad
Television
Year	Title	Role
2014–2017	Paramparça	Ozan Gürpinar
2017–2018	Kırgın Çiçekler	Ali
2019	Tek Yürek	Cem Saruhan
2020	Gençliğim Eyvah	Zola
2020–2021	Menajerimi Ara	Emir
2021–2022	Destan	Temur Tegin
2023–2024	Ateş Kuşları	Barbaros "Barbar" Tunalı
2024–2025	Siyah Kalp	Cihan Şansalan
2026	Aynı Yağmur Altında	Ali

== Awards and nominations ==
Year	Award	Category	Result
2011	14th High School Music Contest	Best Instrumentalist (Drum)	1st place
