= Broumand =

Broumand may refer to:

- Cleopatra Broumand (born 1944/1945), Iranian-born American fashion designer and businessperson
- Mehran Broumand (born 1974), Iranian film producer and film director
- Parviz Broumand Sharif (born 1974), Iranian footballer
