= Ebru Özkan =

Turkish actress (born 1978)

- Born: 18 November 1978 (age 47); Ankara, Turkey
- Occupation: Actress
- Years active: 2006–present
- Spouse: Ertan Saban (m. 2016)
- Children: 1

Ebru Özkan (born 18 November 1978) is a Turkish actress.

== Life and career ==
Ebru Özkan was born on 18 November 1978 in Ankara. She completed her primary school education in Ankara and secondary and high school education in Nevşehir. She settled in Istanbul after her high school education. She started her university education as a scholarship student at Bilkent University, then continued at Ankara University's School of Language and History – Geography and graduated from there. She started her theatre education at primary school level and first wrote a play called Milli Piyango. While continuing her university education, she started acting in the TV series Gözyaşı Çetesi and fantasy child series "Kara İnci" alongside Yetkin Dikinciler for twice. She also had a number of modeling jobs.

Özkan rose to prominence with her role as Halide in Hanımın Çiftliği based on the classic novel. She continued her television career with the youth series Not Defteri, where she played the character of Suna. She played with Haluk Bilginer in series Hayatımın Rolü adaptation of "Mrs. Doubtfire".

She played the character of Dilara in the series Paramparça, which was broadcast between 2014 and 2017 and lasted for 3 seasons.

In 2018, she played the character of Melek in the TV series Şahin Tepesi adaptation of "Falcon Crest". Later, she had the role of İpek Tekin in Hekimoğlu, the Turkish adaptation of the House, M.D. series. In 2021, she was awarded the best actress award by the Radio and Television Journalists Association for her role as İpek Tekin. The award was presented by President Recep Tayyip Erdoğan. She then shared the lead role with Erdal Beşikçioğlu in the TV series Hakim, which is an adaptation of Your Honor.

Together with Timuçin Esen, with whom she shared the leading role in the Hekimoğlu series, she appeared in the Disney+ series Ben Gri. In 2023, she portrayed a mystical character named Çavgeş in the Netflix original series Şahmaran.

== Personal life ==
She married Ertan Saban in 2016 and they had a daughter named Biricik Saban in 2018.

== Filmography ==
Film

Title	Year	Role
Kabuslar Evi	2006	Melisa
Çınar Ağacı	2010	Berrin
Rüzgarın Hatıraları	2015	Leyla
Türkler Geliyor: Adaletin Kılıcı	2020	Mara Hatun
Bihter	2023	Matmazel

Television

Title	Year	Role	Notes
Gözyaşı Çetesi	2006	Deniz	Season 1
Kara İnci	2007	Seçil	Season 1
Güldünya	2008–2009	Duru	Seasons 1-2
Hanımın Çiftliği	2009–2012	Halide Dinçaslan/ Halide Şahin	Seasons 1-2
Anneler ile Kızları	2011	Defne	Season 1
Hayatımın Rolü	2012	Ela	Season 1
Not Defteri	2014	Suna	Season 1
Paramparça	2014–2017	Dilara Terzioğlu Gürpınar	Seasons 1-3
Şahin Tepesi	2018	Melek Özden Sarpkaya	Season 1
Hekimoğlu	2019–2021	İpek Tekin	Seasons 1-2
Hakim	2022	Yasemin Kaner	Season 1
Ben Bu Cihana Sığmazam	2022–2024	Leyla Türk	Season 1
Can Borcu	2024–2025	Handan Çakır	

Web series

Title	Year	Role	Platform	Notes
Ben Gri	2022	Hülya	Disney+	Season 1
Şahmaran	2023	Çavgeş	Netflix	Season 1

Theatre

Title	Year
Atları da Vururlar	2005
Arzu Tramwayı	2008
Romeo ve Juliet	2008
Pandaların Hikayesi	2012
