= Hekimoğlu (TV series) =

Turkish medical drama and comedy television series

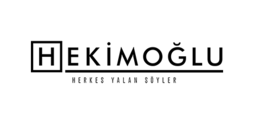
- Genre: Medical drama; Comedy
- Based on: House
- Written by: Banu Kiremitçi Bozkurt (1–14); Neşe Şen (15–25); Elif Benan Tüfekçi (26–33); Esed Akçilad (34–41); Murat Taşkent (42–51)
- Directed by: Hülya Gezer (1–24); Semih Bağcı (15–24); Emre Aybek (25–51)
- Starring: Timuçin Esen; Okan Yalabık; Ebru Özkan; Kaan Yıldırım; Aytaç Şaşmaz; Damla Colbay
- Composer: Tuna Hizmetli
- Country of origin: Turkey
- Original language: Turkish
- No. of seasons: 2
- No. of episodes: 51

Production
- Executive producers: Omer Ozguner; Ummu Burhan; Kerem Catay
- Production locations: Okan University and Okan University Hospital, Istanbul
- Running time: 130 minutes
- Production companies: Karga Seven Pictures; OJO Pictures

Original release
- Network: Kanal D
- Release: December 17, 2019 – May 25, 2021

Hekimoğlu is a Turkish medical drama and comedy television series that ran on the Kanal D TV channel for two seasons, from December 17, 2019, to May 25, 2021. The series were produced by the companies Karga Seven Pictures and OJO Pictures. The series is based on the American medical drama House and, consisting of 2 seasons, ended with its finale, 51st episode, which was released on May 25, 2021.

== Production ==
The series is shot at Okan University Hospital in Tuzla, Istanbul.

== Plot ==
The series' main character, Ateş Hekimoğlu (based on Gregory House) is a famous doctor specializing in infectious diseases and nephrology. He is emotionally distant from his patients, believes in scientific findings rather than what is being told, loves puzzles, and is very pragmatic, neglecting hospital rules and laws when it comes to diagnosis and treatment. The plot also follows his friend from medical school, the hospital manager İpek, and his other close friend, the oncology specialist Orhan. Mehmet Ali, Zeynep and Emre, who make up the team and have very different backgrounds, are in competition with each other to win Hekimoğlu's favor.

== Cast and characters ==
=== Main characters ===
- Ateş Hekimoğlu (Timuçin Esen): a successful doctor in nephrology and infectious diseases, enjoys dealing with his assistant team and is the doctor that İpek and Orhan dote on. He doesn't like working in the polyclinic and likes watching TV in the hospital. Hekimoğlu can solve all cases extraordinarily well. When he was young, he had a clot in one of his right leg veins, and his leg has been limp ever since. For this reason, he both walks with a cane and uses painkillers to the point of addiction. He has a misanthropic understanding of life. He is based on Gregory House.
- Orhan Yavuz (Okan Yalabık): an oncology specialist. He is the only friend of Hekimoğlu who has known him since university and respects what he does.
- İpek Tekin (Ebru Özkan): the hospital manager and an endocrinology specialist. Just like Orhan, she is Hekimoğlu's friend who has known him since school.
- Mehmet Ali Çağlar (Kaan Yıldırım): Hekimoğlu's assistant, a neurologist.
- Emre Acar (Aytaç Şaşmaz): a cardiology and intensive care specialist who is Hekimoğlu's assistant (1–47).
- Zeynep Can (Damla Colbay): an immune system and internal medicine specialist who is Hekimoğlu's assistant (1–47).

=== Supporting characters ===
- Alya (Esra Eron): one of the doctors of the hospital. She supports the team of Orhan and Ateş.
- Muzo (Muhammed Dede): hospital worker that helps Hekimoğlu.
- Aysel (Dilan Serinyel): hospital employee.

== Overview ==
Season	Episodes	Originally released		
Season	Episodes	First released	Last released	Network
1	14	December 17, 2019	April 7, 2020	Kanal D
2	37	September 1, 2020	May 25, 2021	Kanal D
