= Yusuf Kalkavan Anatolian High School =

Coordinates: 36.77095°N 34.49206°E

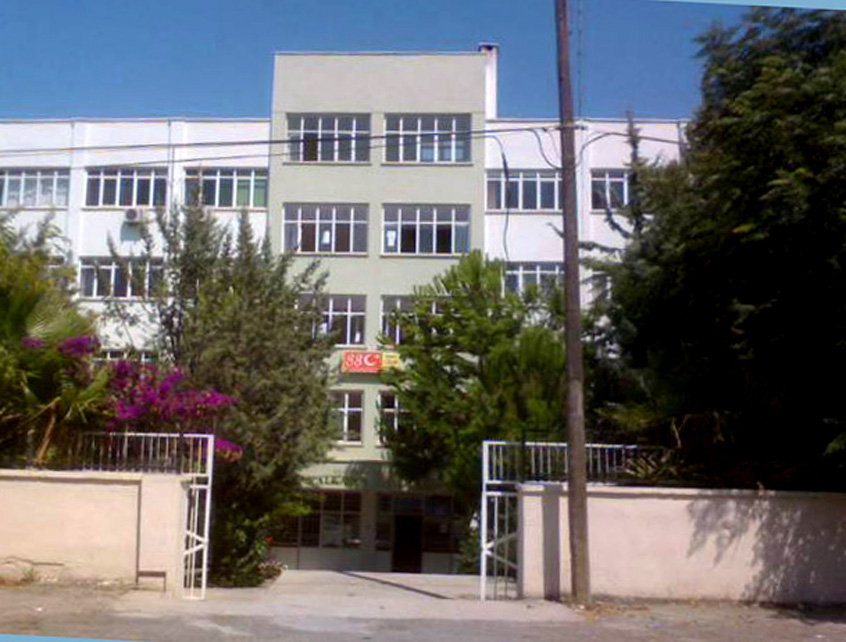

Location
- Yusuf Kalkavan Anadolu Lisesi Mezitli; Mersin; Turkey

Information
- Type: Public, Anatolian High School
- Established: 1992; 34 years ago
- Grades: 9–12
- Colors: Green and Red
- Nickname: YKAL, İkinci Anadolu (The Second Anatolian)
- Website: www.ykal.k12.tr%20ykal.k12.tr

Yusuf Kalkavan Anatolian High School (Turkish: Yusuf Kalkavan Anadolu Lisesi, abbreviated Y.K.A.L) is a Turkish public high school in Mersin. The school admits their students based on the Nationwide High School Entrance score. The education languages are Turkish, English and German. YKAL was opened in 1992 in the region of Mezitli.

== See also ==
- List of high schools in Turkey
