= Türkdoğan =

Türkdoğan is a surname. Notable people with the surname include:

- Göksu Türkdoğan (born 1985), Turkish footballer
- Orhan Türkdoğan (1928–2024), Turkish sociologist
- Öztürk Türkdoğan (born 1969), Turkish lawyer
- Semih Türkdoğan (1912–1994), Turkish sprinter
