= Seyhoun =

Seyhun or Seyhoun (Arabic: سيحون) may refer to:

- Seuhun, Arabic name of Syr Darya river
- Hooshang Seyhoun, Iranian architect, sculptor, painter, scholar and professor
- Massoumeh Seyhoun, Iranian artist, founder of Seyhoun Gallery, Tehran
- Seyhun Topuz, Turkish sculptor
- Seyhoun Gallery, Tehran, art gallery in Iran
- Seyhoun Gallery, Los Angeles, art gallery in USA

== See also ==
- Seyhan (disambiguation)
