= Şehit Osman Altınkuyu Anatolian High School =

Coordinates: 40.6334°N 29.2279°E

- 77200 Samanlı, Yalova, Turkey

Information
- Type: State High School
- Established: 1994
- Principal: Aziz Bozok
- Enrollment: 800+

Şehit Osman Altınkuyu Anatolian High School (Turkish: Şehit Osman Altınkuyu Anadolu Lisesi) is a four-year Anatolian High School located in Yalova, Turkey. It is the first Anatolian High School of Yalova Province. The primary language of instruction is Turkish. The secondary foreign languages are German and English.

== See also ==
- List of high schools in Turkey
