= İçel Anatolian High School =

- İçel Anadolu Lisesi

Location
- Mezitli, Mersin; Turkey
- 36.7392°N 34.5328°E

Information
- School type: Public, Anatolian High School
- Motto: İAL'yiz, bir aileyiz! (We are İAL, we are a family!)
- Established: 1980
- Grades: 9–12
- Colors: Blue, white and grey
- Nickname: İAL, Birinci Anadolu (The First Anatolian)
- Website: ial.meb.k12.tr

İçel Anatolian High School (Turkish: İçel Anadolu Lisesi), known as "İAL", is a public coeducational Anatolian high school in Mersin, Turkey. It was established in 1980, in Arpaçsakarlar Village, but its current building has been built in 1986 in Mezitli. The school admits their students based on the Nationwide High School Entrance score. It requires the highest score among the Anatolian high schools in Mersin, so the school is one of the most successful high schools of the city.

== History ==
İçel Anatolian High School started education as a Preparatory and Secondary School in 1980 in the building of the Basic Education School in Arpaçsakarlar Village in Toroslar. The current building of the school was completed in 1986, under the leadership of Ministry of National Education, with the contribution of the benevolent people of Mersin. Campus of the school is located within the boundaries of Mezitli Municipality in the area. The school has physics, chemistry, biology and computer laboratories. A conference hall for 150 people is also at the service of the students. Social, educational and scientific studies continue with the music classroom, painting workshop and technology class.

The school had its first graduates in the 1986-1987 academic year, who were 47 people. Since the first graduates, a total of 6034 students have graduated.

Almost all of its past graduates have graduated from the best universities in Turkey and they are active in bureaucracy, the private sector, politics, science, and important service sectors worldwide.

== See also ==
- List of high schools in Turkey
