= Ziya Gökalp Anatolian High School =

- Ziya Gökalp Anadolu Lisesi

Location
- Yenişehir; Diyarbakır; Turkey
- 37.916754°N 40.230475°E

Information
- School type: Anatolian High School
- Established: 1892/1893
- Principal: Mehmet Salih Eren
- Enrollment: 1230
- Language: Turkish, English, German
- Website: zgal.meb.k12.tr

Ziya Gökalp Anatolian High School (Turkish: Ziya Gökalp Anadolu Lisesi) is a co-educational Anatolian High School located in the Yenişehir district of Diyarbakır, Turkey. The school is named after Turkish intellectual Mehmet Ziya Gökalp, a prominent nationalist writer and sociologist.

Ziya Gökalp Anatolian High School is among the oldest 100 high schools in Turkey and has a reputation for producing bureaucrats, politicians and poets. The high school admits students without examination and teaches English and German as foreign languages.

== History ==
Ziya Gökalp Anatolian High School was originally founded as Diyarbekir High School (Turkish: Diyarbekir İdâdîsi), which began operating in the academic year 1891-1892. The İdâdî had 5 years of schooling in 1893-1898 and 1901-1910, and 7 years in 1898-1901 and 1910-1913. In 1913, idâdî institutions were closed, and the school became a sultânî on November 16, 1913. Ottoman participation in the First World War and the reliance on conscripts meant that the institution closed its schooling for higher years until 1921. The institution was known as "Diyarbakır Lisesi" after July 1923, but officially closed again as a result of the Sheikh Said rebellion in 1925, though still providing an education under the name "Diyarbakır Erkek Orta Mektebi" from 1926 to 1932.

During his visit to the city on October 1, 1932, Prime Minister İsmet İnönü dined in the People's House where its president and members requested a high school. After İnönü promised to reopen the high school, the institution started educating in the academic year 1932-1933.

The present school building was completed in 1946 and the name was changed to Ziya Gökalp High School in 1953. In the 1990-1991 academic year, the secondary was closed and the school became an Anatolian High School.

== Notable alumni ==
Politicians

- Ayla Akat Ata (Born 1976) — BDP MP for Batman in the 23rd and 24th Parliament of Turkey
- Abdülkadir Aksu (Born 1944) — Minister of the Interior in the 58th and 59th cabinet of Turkey
- Yusuf Azizoğlu (Born 1917) — Minister of Health and Social Welfare in the 27th government of Turkey
- Osman Baydemir (Born 1971) — Former Mayor of Diyarbakır
- Feridun Çelik (Born 1966) — Former Mayor of Diyarbakır
- Mehdi Eker (Born 1956) — Minister of Food, Agriculture and Livestock in the 59th, 60th, 61st and 58th
- Salim Ensarioğlu (Born 1955) — Former Minister of State
- Cuma İçten (Born 1973) — AKP MP for Diyarbakır in the 24th Parliament of Turkey

Artists

- Ahmed Arif (Born 1927) — Poet
- Orhan Asena (Born 1922) — Playwright
- Erol Demiröz (Born 1940) — Actor
- Mustafa Keser (Born 1945) — "Türk Sanat Müziği" Artist
- Mıgırdiç Margosyan (Born 1938) — Writer
- Güler Basu Şen (Born 1957) — Vocal Artist
- Bülent Tekin — Poet

== See also ==
- List of high schools in Turkey
