= Fatih Sultan Mehmet Anatolian High School =

Coordinates: 40.64317°N 29.29298°E

- Yalova, Turkey

Information
- Type: State High School
- Established: 1994
- Principal: Mustafa Derya Arıcı
- Enrollment: 700+
- Website: yfsm.meb.k12.tr

Fatih Sultan Mehmet Anatolian High School (Turkish: Fatih Sultan Mehmet Anadolu Lisesi) is a four-year Anatolian High School located in Yalova, Turkey. The primary language of instruction is Turkish. The secondary foreign languages are German and English.

== See also ==
- List of high schools in Turkey
