= The Plane Tree =

- Theatrical Poster
- Directed by: Handan İpekçi
- Written by: Handan İpekçi
- Produced by: Necati Akpınar
- Starring: Nurgül Yeşilçay; Nejat İşler; Celile Toyon; Suzan Aksoy; Ebru Özkan
- Cinematography: Feza Çaldıran
- Edited by: Aziz İmamoğlu
- Music by: Kemal Sahir Gürel; Ayşe Önder
- Production company: BKM Film
- Distributed by: Medyavizyon
- Release date: March 18, 2011
- Running time: 121 minutes
- Country: Turkey
- Language: Turkish
- Box office: US$1,562,977

The Plane Tree (Turkish: Çınar Ağacı) is a 2011 Turkish comedy-drama film, written and directed by Handan İpekçi, featuring Celile Toyon as a retired teacher who is the catalyst for the bi-monthly reunion of her extended family under the titular plane tree. The film, which opened on March 18, 2011 at number 2 in the Turkish box office, is one of the highest grossing Turkish films of 2011.

== Release ==
The film opened on nationwide general release in 218 screens across Turkey on March 18, 2011 at number 2 in the national box office with a first weekend gross of US$340,424.

== Reception ==
The film remained in the Turkish box-office charts for 20 weeks and made a total gross of US$1,562,977.

== See also ==
- Turkish films off 2011
- 2011 on film
