= Intoxicated by Love =

Iranian-Turkish film

- Directed by: Hassan Fathi
- Written by: Hassan Fathi; Farhad Tohidi
- Produced by: Mehran Broumand hasan alizade
- Starring: Parsa Pirouzfar; Shahab Hosseini; Hesam Manzour; Hande Erçel; Selma Ergeç; Burak Tozkoparan; Boran Kuzum; Bensu Soral; İbrahim Çelikkol; Halit Ergenç; Mustafa Omari
- Cinematography: Morteza Poursamadi
- Edited by: Ceyda Karagül; Dilber Koyuncu
- Music by: Fahir Atakoğlu
- Production companies: Dijital Danatlar; Simarya Film Production
- Distributed by: Filmiran (Iran)
- Release dates: 24 April 2024 (Iran); 17 October 2025 (Worldwide)
- Running time: 105 minutes
- Countries: Iran; Turkey
- Languages: Persian; Turkish
- Box office: 120,000,000,000 tomans (Iran) 2,400,000 dollar

Intoxicated by Love (Persian: مست عشق, romanized: Mast-e Eshgh, Turkish: Mevlana Mest-i Aşk) is a 2024 Iranian-Turkish historical drama romance film written and directed by Hassan Fathi, produced by Mehran Boroumand and Hassan Alizadeh, and Maysam Nourani is the executive producer.. It revolves around two Persian poets Rumi and Shams Tabrizi, played by Parsa Pirouzfar and Shahab Hosseini. The film is a co-production of Iran and Turkey, made by Dijital Danatlar and Simarya Film Production.

The film was released in Iran on April 24, 2024, and it instantly became one of the best-selling films in history of Iranian cinema. It is also the highest-selling non-comedy film. By June, 2024, more than one million and seven hundred thousand people have watched this movie in Iranian cinemas.

The worldwide release of the film began on October 17, 2025. In Turkey, where 250 theaters screened it, the film repeated its domestic box office success.

== Premise ==
The film is a take on the life and career of the 13th-century Persian poet Rumi, his relationship with Shams Tabrizi, the love he had for him, the great influence of Shams over Mawlana in his life and poetry, and his love for the God.

== Production ==
After 3 years of pre-production, on 24 September 2018, it was announced that a movie will be made about the life story of Rumi and Shams Tabrizi, directed by Hassan Fathi and produced by Mehran Broumand.

Fathi started shooting “Intoxicated by Love” in Konya in October of 2019. 2 days before the beginning of 2020, the first teaser of the film was released. With the arrival of COVID-19, the news cycle around the film went silent. About 6 months later, the crew announced that only a few sequences of the film were left and they were waiting for the reopening of the borders to continue filming (due to COVID).

In May 2021, a Persian-language satellite channel announced the broadcast of a Intoxicated by Love TV series in Turkey, which caused a temporary halt in the production of the film. The Turkish investor said that the editing and technical stages of the film had been completed and the contract for the broadcast of a series of the film was closed with this network, while the production of the film had not been completed yet. Fathi broke his silence and reacted sharply in a statement calling this news "regrettable".

Finally, with the legal follow-up carried out by the Iranian Ministry of Foreign Affairs, the 100% ownership of the film was given to the Iranian side and the film entered into its final phase of production.

Almost all of the filming was done in Konya, Turkey.

== Reception ==
=== Box office (Iran) ===
A day before the release, "Intoxicated by Love" sold over 1.5 billion Tomans with its pre-sells tickets, making it an imminent record-breaker in the history of Iranian cinema for the highest sells on the release day.

By attracting 51,000 audience, the movie sold 6 billion Tomans on the release day, breaking a historical record and surpassing even the most successful films in the comedy genre. Mohammadreza Saberi, the secretary and spokesperson of the country's cinematographers association, called the film's level of success "an important event for the Iranian cinema".

The film reached the 4th place in the total sales of 2024's Iranian cinema, with 10.7 billion tomans in the first 2 days of release. With 33 billion tomans at the box office in less than a week, the film became the highest-selling non-comedy film in history of Iranian cinema.

== Cast ==
- Parsa Pirouzfar as Mawlana
- Shahab Hosseini as Shams Tabrizi
- Hande Erçel as Kimia Khatoon
- Burak Tozkoparan as Sultan Walad
- Boran Kuzum as Ala ad-Din Muhammad II
- Hesam Manzour as Husam al-Din Chalabi
- Bensu Soral as Maryam
- Selma Ergeç as Kera Khatoon
- İbrahim Çelikkol as Eskandar
- Halit Ergenç as Baha al-Din Valad

== Music ==
Fahir Atakoğlu, the composer of works such as Omar and Magnificent Century, composed the film's music and Alireza Ghorbani performed the title music.
