= Orhan Türkdoğan =

Turkish sociologist (1928–2024)

- Born: 18 October 1928; Malatya, Turkey
- Died: 1 February 2024 (aged 95); Ankara, Turkey

Education
- Education: Ankara University

Philosophical work
- Era: 20th-century philosophy
- Region: Social geography Philosophy of geography: Turkish philosophy
- School: Positivism

Orhan Türkdoğan (18 October 1928 – 1 February 2024) was a Turkish sociologist and historian known for his research and publications on various topics, including village sociology, ethnic sociology, social movements, and culture.

== Early life and education ==
Türkdoğan was born in Malatya, Turkey, in 1928. He received his primary and secondary education in Malatya and went on to graduate from Ankara University, Faculty of Language, History, and Geography with a degree in Philosophy and Sociology in 1955.

== Career ==
After graduating, Türkdoğan worked as a philosophy teacher at Malatya High School between 1955 and 1959. He then became an assistant at Atatürk University, Faculty of Business Administration, where he received his doctorate in 1962 with a study titled "Social Organisation of Malakans".

Between 1962 and 1964 Türkdoğan pursued further studies in anthropology, sociology, psychology, village sociology, and community development at the universities of Nebraska and Missouri in the United States. In 1967 he became an associate professor with a socio-anthropological study of the health and disease system in thirty-eight villages of Erzurum, and in 1971, he became a professor in Turkey with his work "Basic Problems of Village Sociology".

In 1972 Türkdoğan was invited to Germany with a DAAD scholarship provided by the German government, where he conducted a socio-economic research on first-generation Turkish workers. In 1980, he was invited to Germany again with the same scholarship to conduct research on the second generation and carried out a large-scale study of the second generation in certain labor culture areas. In the same year, he traveled to the University of St Andrews in Scotland to conduct research on terrorism and violence.

Throughout his career Türkdoğan served as the head of the department and dean of the faculty at various universities. He also transferred to Gazi University Bolu Administrative Sciences High School, where he took part in the establishment of Bolu Abant İzzet Baysal University between 1985 and 1995. In 1995, he moved to Gebze Technical University.

== Death ==
Türkdoğan died in Ankara on 1 February 2024, at the age of 95.

== Criticism and controversy ==
Orhan Türkdoğan, in his book Ethnic Sociology and during a speech in Houston in 1997, made a highly controversial statement that "There is no such thing as the Kurdish people or nation" and that they are merely carriers of Turkish culture and habits.

== Publications ==
Türkdoğan wrote numerous articles and books on various sociological topics. Some of his notable works include:

- Malakanların Sosyal Organizasyonu (Social Organization of the Malaccans, 1970)
- Batı Almanya'nın Bir Kentinde Türk İşçilerinin SosyoEkonomik Yapısı (Socioeconomics Structuring of Turkish Workers in a Western German City, 1973)
- Salihli'de Türkistan Göçmenlerinin Yerleşmesi (Settlement of Turkistan Emigrants in Salihli)
- Yoksulluk Kültürü (Culture of Poverty)
- Köy Sosyolojisinin Temel Sorunları (Main Questions of Rural Sociology)
- Sanayi Sosyolojisi (Industrial Sociology)
- SosyoEkonomik Sistem Tartışmaları (Socioeconomic System Discussions)
- Kemalist Modelde Fert ve Devlet İlişkisi (Relationship of the Individual and the State in the Kemalist Model)
- Türkiye'de Weber'ci Görüşler (Weberian Views in Turkey)
- İkinci Neslin Dramı – Avrupa'daki İşçilerimiz ve Çocukları (The Sad Status of the Second Generation- Our Workers and Their Children in Europe, 1984)
- Millî Kültür Meseleleri (Issues of National Culture)
- Sağlık ve Hastalık Sistemi (System of Health Promotion and Poor Health)
- Bilimsel Araştırma ve Değerlendirme Metodolojisi (Methodology of Scientific Research and Evaluation)
- Aydınlıktakiler (Those in the Light)
- Karanlıktakiler (Those in the Dark)
- Toplumumuzun Dramı (The Sad Status of Our Society, 1982)
- Çağdaş Türk Sosyolojisi (Contemporary Turkish Sociology, 1995)
- Türk Tarihinin Sosyolojisi (Sociology of Turkish History, 1995)
- Sosyal Şiddet ve Türkiye Gerçeği (Social Violence and the Reality of Turkey, 1985)
- Ziya Gökâlp Sosyolojisinde Bazı Kavramların Değerlendirilmesi (Assessment of Some Concepts in Ziya Gökalp's Sociological Methodology)
- Alevî Bektâşî Kimliği (Identity of the Alewi-Bektaşi 1996)
- İşçi Kültürünün Yükselişi (Rise of the Workers’ Culture, 1998)
- Kemalist Sistemin Kültürel Boyutları (Cultural Dimensions of the Kemalist System, 1999)
