= Mine Tugay =

Turkish actress

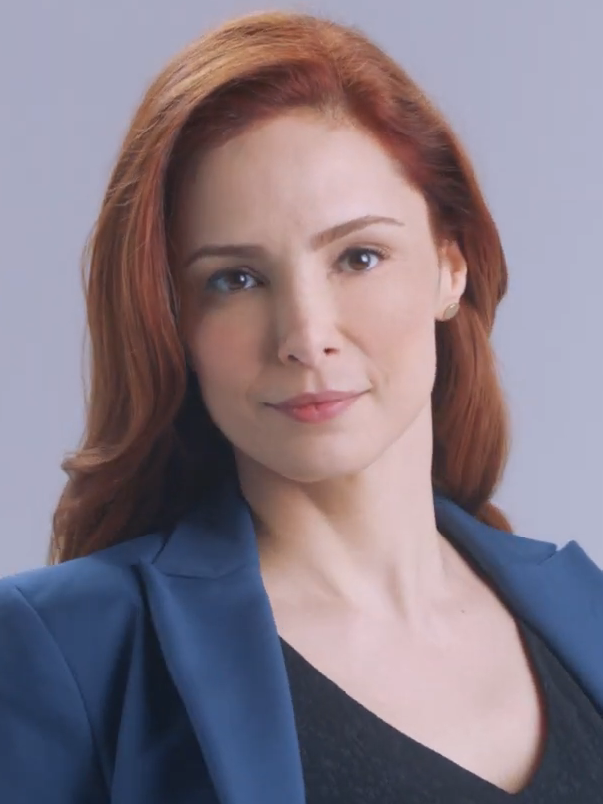
- Tugay in 2019
- Born: 28 July 1978 (age 48); Konya, Turkey
- Education: Istanbul University State Conservatory
- Occupation: Actress
- Years active: 1997–present

Mine Tugay (born 28 July 1978) is a Turkish actress. She is a graduate of Istanbul University State Conservatory and has appeared in various plays on stage.

== Life and career ==
Tugay was born in Konya, where her parents had moved to due to her father's working requirements. She studied at Yeni Levent High School. Her first acting experience was in 1997 with a role in Büyük Kulaklı Küçük Ayı, which went on stage at Masal Gerçek Theatre. In the same, she started taking acting lessons at Müjdat Gezen Arts Center. She was a classmate of fellow actresses Özge Özberk and Özgü Namal. In their class of 15 students, she was among the 13 students who were dismissed due to 'lack of discipline'. In 1998, she enrolled in Istanbul University State Conservatory. After graduating from the conservatory, she started going on stage at Semaver Company.

In 2003, with the help of Işıl Kasapoğlu, she was cast in the adaptation of plays Twelfth Night and Kuşlar Meclisi. In the same year, she had a supporting role in the TV series Gülbeyaz. In 2004, she continued her career in television with a role in Adı Aşk Olsun and had her first cinematic experience with Gönül Yarası. In the same year, again with the help of Işıl Kasapoğlu and Bülent Emin Yarar, she was cast in an adaptation of Mem and Zin.

In 2005, she played in the TV series Aşk Her Yaşta. While completing her master's degree in Advanced Acting in Bahçeşehir University, she took part in the series Aliye. In 2006, she got her master's degree with Emre Koyuncuoğlu's was given a role in the play Çok Uzak. Tugay continued her career on television with leading roles in Show TV's series Gülpare and Star TV's series Benden Baba Olmaz. She was cast opposite Haluk Piyes in TRT 1's series Aynadaki Düşman in 2009. In 2011, she portrayed chief commander Suna in Behzat Ç. Bir Ankara Polisiyesi.

She joined the cast of Kanal D's Öyle Bir Geçer Zaman ki in its third season, playing the role of Bahar. Together with Engin Hepileri, Tugay hosted the 2013 Antalya Television Awards. Another breakthrough in her career came with her role in Star TV's popular teen drama Medcezir. After her character was killed off in season one, she announced on Twitter that this was solely the writer's decision to have her character removed from the story. In 2014, she had a leading role in ATV's series Kalp Hırsızı opposite Kenan Ece, but the series was not popular and concluded after a few episodes. After playing a supporting role Çilek Kokusu and a leading role Paramparça, Tugay portrayed the character of Şeniz Karaçay in Zalim İstanbul between 2019 and 2020.

== Filmography ==
=== TV series ===
Year	Title	Role	Notes
1998	Karambol Kamil	-	Leading role
2002	Gülbeyaz	Başak	Supporting role
2004	Adı Aşk Olsun	Eda	Leading role
2004	Aliye	Defne	Supporting role
2005	Aşk Her Yaşta	Elvan	Supporting role
2006	Gülpare	Gülbahar	Leading role
2007	Benden Baba Olmaz	Sevil	Leading role
2008	Sınıf	Özlem	Leading role
2009	Aynadaki Düşman	Nisan Yağmur	Leading role
2009–2010	Kapalı Çarşı	Feride / Elif	Supporting role
2011–2012	Behzat Ç. Bir Ankara Polisiyesi	Suna	Supporting role
2011	5'er Beşer	Bengisu	Leading role
2012	Yalan Dünya	Aysu	Supporting role
2012–2013	Öyle Bir Geçer Zaman ki	Bahar	Supporting role
2013–2014	Medcezir	Ender Kaya Serez	Leading role
2014	Kalp Hırsızı	Defne	Leading role
2015	Çilek Kokusu	Elçin	Supporting role
2016–2017	Paramparça	Asuman Terzioğlu	Leading role
2019–2020	Zalim İstanbul	Şeniz Karaçay	Leading role
2021	Hükümsüz	Güler Kırel	Guest role
2022	Gülümse Kaderine	Neval	Leading role
2023	Yalı Çapkını	Defne	Guest role

=== Film ===
Year	Title	Role	Notes
2004	Gönül Yarası	Pazarlık Yapan Kadın	Supporting role
2005	Hacivat Karagöz Neden Öldürüldü?	Bacı Aslı	Supporting role
2009	Kaptan Feza	Elif	Leading role
2010	Sessiz Çocuklar	-	Leading role
2010	Herkes mi aldatır?	Nil	Leading role
2014	9on	Nermin	Supporting role

=== Short film ===
Year	Title	Role	Notes
2007	Yoldaki Kedi	-	Leading role
2007	Felix Und Scorpion	Customer	Leading role
2010	10, 9, 8, 7..	-	Leading role

== Theatre ==
Year	Title	Venue	Notes
2002–2003	Twelfth Night	Semaver Company	
2002–2003	Kuşlar Meclisi	Semaver Company	
2003–2004	Mem and Zin	Semaver Company	
2004–2005	Çok Uzak	DOT Theatre	
2007	Yalancı Tanık	Okuma Theatre	
2007–2008	Blackbird	DOT Theatre	
2008–2009	Shoot/Get Treasure/Repeat	DOT Theatre	
2009	Yusuf ile Menofis	Okuma Theatre	
2010	İnsanlık Ölmedi Ya	Okuma Theatre	
2010–2011	As You Like It	Talimhane Theatre	
2010–2011	Pinball	Istanbul State Theatre	
2011	5'er Beşer	BKM	
2014	Arkadaşım Hoşgeldin	BKM	Guest appearance

== Awards and nominations ==
Year	Award	Category	Work	Result
2008	Sinepark Short Film Festival	Best Actress	Yoldaki Kedi	Won
2008	VIII. Lions Theatre Awards	Best Actress	Blackbird	Won
2009	Afife Theatre Awards	Most Successful Actress of the Year	Blackbird	Won
