= Seyhan (disambiguation) =

Seyhan is a district-municipality in the Adana Province of Turkey.

Seyhan may also refer to:

== Places ==
- Seyhan, Seyhan, a village in the district of Seyhan, Adana, Turkey
- Seyhan Dam, a hydroelectric dam on the Seyhan River
- Seyhan Rotary Anadolu Lisesi, a high school in Turkey
- Seyhan River, a river in Turkey
- Seyhan, Iran, a village in Khuzestan Province, Iran

== People ==
=== Given name ===
- Seyhan Arman (born 1980), Turkish transgender rights activist, actress, and drag queen
- Seyhan Erözçelik (1962-2001), Turkish poet
- Seyhan Gündüz (born 1980), Turkish women's footballer
- Seyhan Kurt (born 1971), French-Turkish poet, writer and sociologist
- Seyhan Soylu, Turkish television director
- Seyhan Cenk Tekelioğlu (born 1973), Turkish footballer
- Seyhan Yildiz (born 1989), Swiss-born Liechtensteiner footballer

=== Surname ===
- Mustafa Hüseyin Seyhan (born 1996), Turkish footballer
- Tolga Seyhan (born 1977), Turkish footballer
