= Bornova Anatolian High School =

- Bornova Anatolian High School logo

Location
- Mevlana Mahallesi Ord. Prof. Dr. Muhiddin Erel Caddesi No: 15 Bornova; İzmir; Turkey
- 38°26′51″N 27°13′16″E

Information
- School type: Anatolian High School
- Motto: "BAL'lı olmak ayrıcalıktır." ("It is a privilege to be from BAL.")
- Established: 26 March 1953
- Enrollment: 2031
- Website: http://izmirbal.meb.k12.tr/

Bornova Anatolian High School (Turkish: Bornova Anadolu Lisesi, abbreviated as "BAL") is a prominent school in Turkey.

== History ==
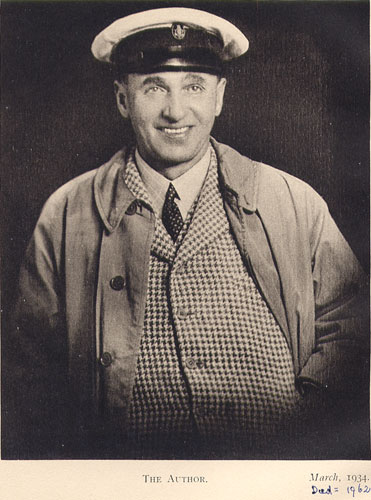
Edmond H. Giraud, previous owner of the school's land and one of the shareholders of the Özel Ege Koleji in March 1934

The school was established in 1953 as İzmir College in İzmir. In 1955, it was formed into one of the 6 newly opened Maarif Colleges around different regions of Turkey, which was established by the Ministry of Education, to teach in foreign languages. The area of the school and the buildings such as the mansion within belonged to Edmond Giraud, a wealthy Levantine of French and British descent who also had property in the centre of Bornova. Giraud sold his property on the condition that it would be used only for education. He also became one of the shareholders of this newly founded school.

In 1975, the Ministry of Education decided to change the name Maarif College into Anatolian High School. In 1976 the school's name was changed into Bornova Anatolian High School.

Until 1979, the medium of instruction at Bornova Anatolian High School was English. In that year, the school opened its German language department, to teach in German.

Recently, Bornova Anatolian High School has reached to the largest student population within the high schools of Turkey. In 1997, the school opened its French Department, which made it the first Turkish high school to have its medium of instruction in three different foreign languages.

The school teaches most of its classes in Turkish today, but the students receive intensive education in at least two foreign languages as designated by the Anatolian High Schools law.

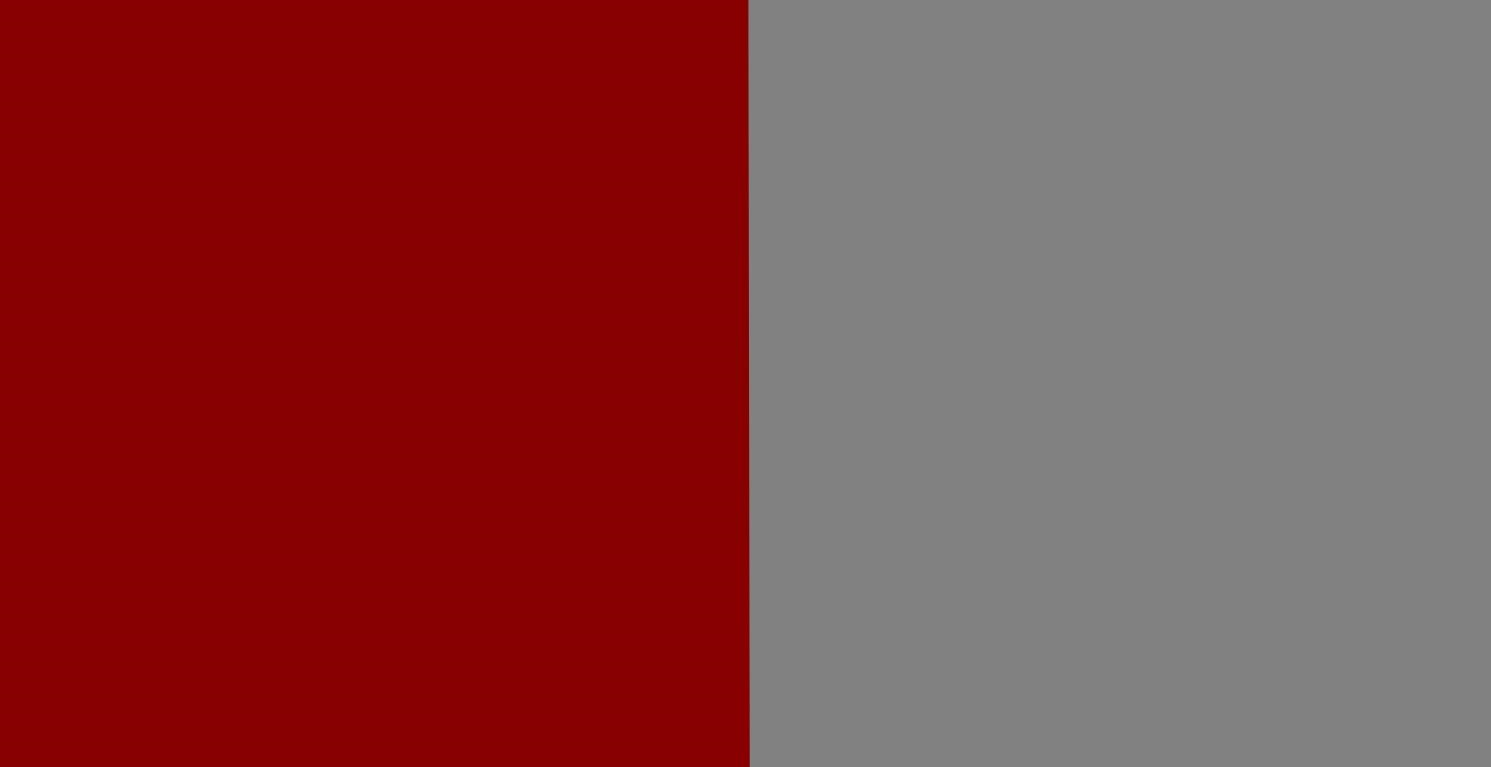
Bornova Anatolian High School's colors.

== Education ==
Bornova Anatolian High School is the second Anatolian High School in İzmir, according to the high school entry points for 3 consequent years. In 2007, in the University Entrance Exam of Turkey, which has over 1.5 million applicants every year, Bornova Anatolian High School had 7 results in top 100, 81 in top 1000 and 304 in top 5000.

The school is one year longer than usual High Schools with having a preparation class program. In the first year, students go through intense language education regarding their first foreign language of choice, options being German, French and English. Students in German language program are able to partake in DSD exams to receive a language certificate from the German government.

== List of student communities and activities ==
Bornova Anatolian High School is also known for its student communities and extracurricular activities. Students can open new communities and join the already existing ones however they wish. Down below is a list of student communities in BAL.

- Debate Community
- Theater Community
- School Promotion Community
- Economics and Social Sciences Community
- MUN Community
- Radio Community
- FRC Team
- Game Design Community
- Illusionism Community

BAL also has 3 annual student conferences. A Model United Nations conference (HONEYMUN), in which the students simulate modern problems and propose solutions. A youth charette (BALGÇ), in which students propose solutions to the nations' problems. And there is TedX, in which successful persons from different carrier paths come to tell their study and inspire the students.

BAL is also home to the first student association in Turkey. Bornova Anatolian High School Students' Association (BALÖDER) is a legal association formed "to foster student unity in the digital age using the most modern tools and to pass on the spirit of BAL to future generations".

== School song ==
The school song is written and composed by the music teacher at the school, Naci Önöz, in 1965.
