= Paramparça (TV series) =

Turkish television drama series

- Also known as: Paramparca
- Genre: Soap opera
- Written by: Yıldız Tunç; Su Ersöz; Derem Çıray; Atilla Özel; Ayça Üzüm
- Directed by: Cevdet Mercan (season 1)
- Starring: Ebru Özkan Saban; Nurgül Yeşilçay; Erkan Petekkaya; Cemal Hünal; Alina Boz; Ahu Yağtu; Mine Tugay; Layla Tanlar; Tolga Tekin; Nursel Köse; Burak Tozkoparan; Ayhan Bozkurt; Ömer Faruk Yüksek; Isa Cıvan Kavak; Hümeyra; Ilhan Şeşen
- Opening theme: "Paramparça Jenerik Müziği"
- Composers: Ayşe Önder; Umit Önder; Murat "Mayki" Başaran
- Country of origin: Turkey
- Original languages: Turkish; English
- No. of seasons: 3
- No. of episodes: 97

Production
- Executive producer: Selma Koçoğlu Yücel
- Producers: Gökhan Tatarer; H. Hakan Eren
- Production location: Istanbul
- Running time: 100–140 minutes
- Production company: Endemol Shine Turkey

Original release
- Network: Star TV
- Release: December 1, 2014 – March 27, 2017

Paramparca (English title: Broken Pieces) is a Turkish soap opera television series produced by Endemol Shine Turkey, starring Erkan Petekkaya, and Ebru Özkan Saban. It premiered on Star TV on December 1, 2014.

== Plot ==
The story follows two women whose lives are intertwined following an accident. Gülseren who is pregnant, is hit by a car and brought to hospital to give birth. Meanwhile, Dilara gives birth at the same hospital. Due to a similarity in their surnames, the nurses switch the babies while taking to intensive care nursery and wrongfully given to wrong parents; Gülseren's baby given to Dilara and Dilara's baby given to Gülseren. Fifteen years later, Gülseren lives with her adoptive daughter Hazal and sister-in-law Keriman in a poor apartment and Dilara lives with her adoptive daughter Cansu and biological son Ozan in a luxurious villa in the seashore of Bosphorus. Gülseren works as saleswoman in small store. Dilara's relationship with her husband Cihan, a rich businessman, breaks down and Cihan leaves her. He starts dating Gülseren, which aggravates Dilara.

Cihan's childhood friend Harun, who has been in love with Dilara since they were students, comes to Istanbul to take revenge on Cihan for the death of his sister who committed suicide after she and Cihan broke up. Harun tries to win Dilara's heart as he had never married because of his love for her. Cihan proposes to Gülseren and Dilara becomes pregnant carrying Harun's baby. On the day of Cihan and Gülseren's wedding, Gülseren is accidentally shot and killed by the ex-husband of Ozan's girlfriend (who was aiming Ozan).

After Gülseren's death, Cihan's life becomes complicated and he remarries Dilara but neither Dilara or Cihan are happy about this remarriage. Dilara falls in love with Harun while Cihan falls in love with Ayşe, a well-known psychiatrist and kickboxer; she is identified by Cihan as the cousin of Harun and leaves Dilara for her, in the meantime, Dilara cannot abort her baby and compassionately gives birth to the child. Ayşe is killed as she intrudes on Cihan's father, who accidentally shot her to death while he was about to commit suicide.

The final season shows the different lives of the characters, Cihan is seen embarking, and exhausted with flashbacks of his earlier events, Dilara marries Harun and both live with their child, Alaz, in Dilara's home, siblings Hazal and Ozan become business partners, and Cansu prematurely marries Deniz and expects a baby, However she loses her baby because of her Parkinson's disease, which was caused by her falling into a coma after a severe car crash. She then adopts a baby, but she cannot take care of it properly as she suffers from body tremors. This leads to child protective services taking away her baby and Deniz breaking up with her amicably.

Soon Cihan returns to his family, and everyone welcomes him except Harun, who is still jealous and thinks that he had affair with Dilara. Harun becomes delighted when he discovers that Ozan is his biological son, but he is tragically killed in a mass shooting perpetrated by his client Damir's men while shielding Ozan from gunshot. This provides a great opportunity for Cihan and Dilara's relationship to grow because they fall for each other. Damir, who is wanted by Cihan, secretly dates Hazal, without acknowledging his connection with the mafia and the murder of Harun. Damir and Hazal finally cut off their connection until she admits the truth. The series ends with the assassination of Damir carried out by Cihan (after an earlier assassination attempt pulled by Dilara), and it goes with the wedding of Cihan and Dilara.

== Controversies and lawsuits ==
There was an on-set dispute and conflict between Nurgul Yesilcay and Erkan Petekkaya, regarding kissing scenes and personal issues, which led to Yesilcay's departure from the show in February 2016. Yeşilçay, who played Gulseren, accused Erkan Petekkaya of "mobbing" her, and the producer of turning a blind eye to what was happening on the set. Yesilcay claimed that Petekkaya put psychological pressure on her and nobody spoke out about it, and therefore announced that she would take the issue to court.

In an interview, Yesilcay stated that Petekkaya allegedly reiterated that he "cannot play a lover" with her onscreen and frequently felt uneasy with her, in addition to allegedly "belittling" and "humiliating" her on-set through his male privilege. Petekkaya, who is married with a child, allegedly retorted that Yesilcay is "too interested in kissing" and how she is "already accustomed to such things" after asking him why he would not kiss her onscreen. Regarding Yesilcay's accusations, Petekkaya responded that the kissing issue and his influence on her leaving the series were "full of lies and slander, every word of which was thought out and designed", before declaring that he "will not tell the truth" because "it would be very bad."

Furthermore, Yeşilçay expressed that the season 1 director Cevdet Mercan could not handle what was happening and left in June 2015. She claimed that the new director only approved of Petekkaya's requests and suggestions. Endemol Shine Turkey also made a press statement and stated that they will sue Yesilcay for her "unrealistic statements". In 2017, Petekkaya filed a lawsuit against Yeşilçay, alleging that she insulted him via mobile phone messages, though Petekkaya withdrew his complaint. Yesilcay and Petakkaya have since been estranged, after Yesilcay announcing that she "will have nothing to do with him from now on".

== Cast ==
Character	Episodes	Actor(ess)	Description
Cihan Gürpinar	1-97	Erkan Petekkaya	He is Dilara's husband. He is Hazal's father and the stepfather of Ozan, Cansu and Alaz. He is Rahmi's son. He is Gulseren's ex-husband and Hayal's ex-boyfriend. He is Deniz's father-in-law and Burhan's coscre. He is Asuman and Alper's brother-in-law.
Dilara Terzioğlu Gürpinar/Erguvan	1-97	Ebru Özkan Saban	She is Cihan's wife. She is the mother of Hazal, Ozan and Alaz .
Gulseren Gülpinar/Gürpinar	1-52	Nurgul Yesilcay	She is Cihan ex-wife and Ozkan's ex-wife. She is Cansu's mother and Hazel's stepmother.
Harun Erguvan	32-90	Barış Falay	He is Dilara's ex-husband. He is the father of Ozan and Alaz, and the stepfather of Hazal.
Asuman Terzioğlu	72-97	Mine Tugay	She is Dilara's half-sister.
Damır Yankov	82-97	Sarp Akkaya	
Özkan Gülpinar	1-97	Tolga Tekin	
Keriman Akçatepe	1-97	Nursel Köse	
Hazal Gürpinar	1-97	Alina Boz	
Ozan Gürpinar	1-97	Burak Tozkoparan	
Rahmi Gürpinar	1-73, 77-97	Civan Canova	
Alper Tek	1-49	Cemal Hünal	
Solmaz Tek	1-50	Güneş Emir	
Candan Soylu	9-88, 94-97	Ahu Yağtu	
Yıldırım Altun	1-97	Ertuğrul Postoğlu	
Engin	32, 50- 97	Ayhan Bozkurt	
Șeyda	1-31	Aslıhan Kapanșahin	
Derya Koçoğlu	1-50	Elvin Aydoğdu	
Mahide Erkoç	2-53, 72-75, 77-82	Hümeyra	
Ayşe Yükselen	32-71	Şükran Ovalı	
Deniz Aydin	53-89, 94-97	Ceyhun Mengiroğlu	
Selma Apak	74-75, 77-87, 94-97	Sinem Öztürk	
Burhan Colak	40-80	Taner Turan	
Özgür Eraslan	63-78	Efecan Şenolsun	
Emine	1-97	Özlem Yaylacıkoral	
Sema	1-97	Funda Dönmez	
Hacer	1, 6-97	Nalan Bașaran	
Sevinç	57-69	Başak Akbay	
Bahtiyar	1-97	Bahtiyar Demir	
Çağatay	34-76	Serdar Yıldırım	
Azmi	1-97	Yusuf Özdek	
Beril	9-90, 94-97	Aylin Eren	
Çiğdem	1-85	Radife Baltaoglu	
Hatice	60-97	Güneş Hayat	
Osman	19-31	Bülent Düzgünoğlu	
Nezaket	17-31	Ayta Sözeri	
Nuray		Pınar Erincin	
Mehmet	30-32	Yunus Güner	
Zeynep	45-57	Funda Güray	
Aliye	32-97	Elif Baysal	
Mithat Mete Pars	72-97	Sarpcan Köroğlu	
Ekrem Çelık	82-97	İlhan Şeşen	
Suat	14-71	Volkan Bora Dilek	
Nergis	1-5, 7, 9-10, 12-14, 16-21, 23-24, 26-27, 29, 31, 33-34, 36, 38-40, 43-44, 46-51, 53-55	Suna Dizdar	
Azra	86-97	Dünya Aydoğdu	
Şahin	93-97	Hasan Şahintürk	
Demir Alaz Erguvan		Ömer Faruk Yüksek	
Can Haşmet Gülpınar		Isa Civan Kavak	

== Series overview ==
Season	Episode	Originally aired		TV Channel
Season	Episode	First aired	Last aired	TV Channel
1	1-31 (31)	December 1, 2014	June 29, 2015	Star TV
2	32-71 (40)	September 14, 2015	June 20, 2016	Star TV
3	72-97 (26)	September 19, 2016	March 27, 2017	Star TV

== International broadcasts ==
Country	TV	Premiere date	Title
Iraq (Iraqi Kurdistan)	Kurdmax	April 1, 2015	Parçe parçe bun
United States	Adult Swim	June 12, 2015	Broken Pieces
Afghanistan	1TV	May 2015	Broken Pieces
Bangladesh	Asian TV	December 2020	আয়েশা/মরিয়ম (Aysha/Moriom)
Lithuania	LNK	LNK: August 5, 2015;	Gyvenimo šukės
Indonesia	ANTV	September 7, 2015	Cansu & Hazal
Georgia	Imedi TV	September 7, 2015	ნამსხვრევები
Iran	GEM TV	October 3, 2015	Güzel (گوزل)
Romania	Kanal D Happy Channel	October 5, 2015; August 8, 2022	Furtună pe Bosfor
Greece	Mega Channel	October 19, 2015	Pαγισμένες καρδιές (Broken hearts)
Bulgaria	bTV bTV Lady	November 9, 2015; January 14, 2018	Tвоят мой живот
Kazakhstan	Habar TV	November 11, 2015	Осколки
North Macedonia	Alsat-M; Sitel	December 15, 2015; October 3, 2016	Fate të lidhura (Albanian); Парампарче (Macedonian)
Albania	TV Klan	December 19, 2015	Fate të kryqëzuara
Croatia	Nova TV	January 4, 2016	Tuđi život
Hungary	TV2	February 15, 2016	Megtört szívek
Poland	TVP1	March 8, 2016	Rozdarte serca
(Saudi Arabia) Arab World	OSN Yahala	March 20, 2016	Ishq W Domou
Israel	Viva+	May 1, 2016	רסיסים (Shards)
Serbia	Prva TV; Prva world	July 18, 2016; June 1, 2017	Paramparčad
Slovakia	TV Doma	August 1, 2016	Vymenené životy
Ukraine	1+1	August 8, 2016	Уламки щастя
Sweden	SVT2	August 22, 2016	Förväxlingen
Montenegro	Prva CG	August 29, 2016	Paramparčad
Japan	TV Tokyo	July 27, 2016	破片
Estonia	Kanal 2	October 10, 2016	Purunenud elud
France	France 5	November 11, 2016	Morceaux
Mongolia	Asian Box	January 12, 2017	Аз жаргалын хэлтэрхий
Chile	Canal 13 (Chile)	January 16, 2017	Paramparça
Italy	Rai 2	February 14, 2017 (Valentine's Day)	Pezzi rotti
Ethiopia	Kana TV	July 4, 2017 – June 17, 2018; January 21, 2019 – August 21, 2019	ሽንቁር ልቦች (Broken Hearts)
South Africa	EExtra	October 1, 2018	Gebroke Harte
Slovenia	Planet TV	July 3, 2017; November 2018; December 2019 – June 2020	Tuje življenje
Bosnia and Herzegovina	OBN	January 30, 2018	Paramparčad
Mexico	Imagen	January 8, 2019	Vidas cruzadas
Kazakhstan	Qazaqstan TV	November 5, 2019	Шытынаған тағдыр
Colombia	Caracol TV	August 26, 2019	Lazos de sangre
Spain	Nova	July 19, 2021	Vidas cruzadas
South Korea	Korea New Network	August 7, 2021	부서진 조각들
Czech Republic	Nova Lady	February 14, 2022	Vyměnené osudy
Brazil	Sistema Brasileiro de Televisão	May 19, 2025	Pedaços quebrados

== See also ==
- Paramparça, 1985 film
- Switched at Birth, 2011–17 TV series
- Binbir Gece, 2006–09 TV series
- Aşk ve Ceza, 2010–11 TV series
