= Samsun Atatürk Anatolian High School =

Samsun Atatürk Anadolu Lisesi Samsun Anatolian High School

Location
- Samsun; Turkey
- 41°16′39″N 36°19′49″E

Information
- Type: Public
- Established: 1998
- Principal: Yunus Ataseyyar
- Enrollment: National OKS (High Schools Entrance Exam)
- Colors: Black and Yellow
- Mascot: -
- Website: samsunaal.meb.k12.tr

Samsun Atatürk Anatolian High School (Turkish: Samsun Anadolu Lisesi) is an Anatolian High School, educating in its historical building which is established in Samsun city, Turkey.

== Education ==
Its education is based on Anatolian High School System, and it is one of the most selective High-Schools in Black Sea coast of Turkey, and the most selective Anatolian High School in Samsun. (According to the High-School Entrance Exam Statistics (1)) Educating language is Turkish. English and German are compulsory foreign languages.

Due to the Turkish Education System in 10th grade of school, students select one of the three sections, which are "Foreign Language Based", "Maths-Science Based" and "Turkish-Maths Based". Although the hours of each courses change in this sections, students are responsible all of the main courses like Maths, Turkish, Physics, History etc. Also students can take courses like Drawing, Music, Computer Science, PE etc.

== Building and Laboratories ==
The school has physics, chemistry, biology and computer science laboratories; and also music, drawing and foreign languages rooms.

== History ==
Before Republic

In the last quarter of the 19th century, the Ottoman Empire, which was trying to reform its educational system, did several enterprises to French Education Ministry, after all of these enterprises and the success of Galatasaray Sultanisi (which was founded in the control of the French educator M.Savier), the Ottomans decided to open Sultanis in every region.

Because of these decisions, Samsun Atatürk Anatolian High School opened with the name "Samsun Sultanisi" as the first and the only Sultani in Samsun.

In 1914 it served as a military hospital, and on 14 March 1919 with the occupation of Samsun by British forces, its building was used as the Headquarters of (Samsun) British Occupation Forces.

After Republic After 1923 the school building was used as an Orphans' House. In 1927 the school opened as a high school again and was renamed Samsun Lisesi (Samsun High-School).

On 26 October 1930, the school was visited by Atatürk, and he said one of his most famous quotes there, "Teachers, we set up the Republic but you are the ones who will cause it to rise and make it live. Republic wants you generations which have free mind, free conscience, free knowledge and high character.The real lighter in life is Science."

In 1998 it became an Anatolian High School and took the name "Ataturk Anatolian High School".
