= Beşiktaş Anatolian High School =

Coordinates: 41.0428°N 29.0128°E

Location
- Yıldız, Çırağan Cd. No:30; Beşiktaş; İstanbul, 34349; Turkey

Information
- School type: Anatolian High School
- Established: 1959
- Founder: Abdul Hamid II
- Head of school: Ziya Uluçay
- Grades: Preparatory Grade, 9, 10, 11, 12
- Enrollment: 523
- Language: Turkish, English, German
- Website: www.besiktasanadolu.meb.k12.tr

Beşiktaş Anatolian High School (Turkish: Beşiktaş Anadolu Lisesi) is a five-year Anatolian High School located on the European side of Istanbul and one of the best schools in Turkey. The primary languages of instruction are Turkish and English. The mandatory secondary foreign language is German.

== History ==
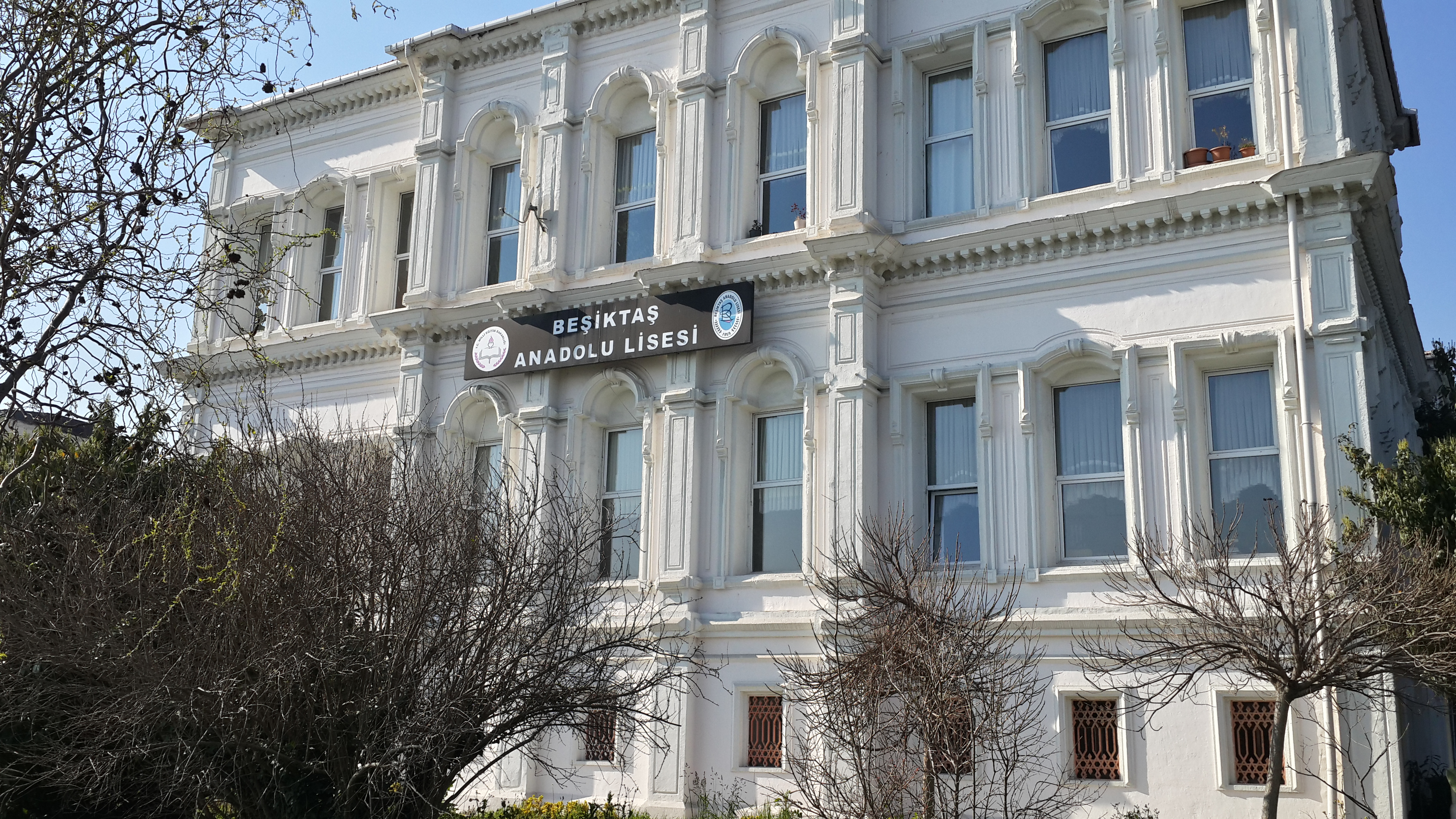
Anatolian High School entrance

Beşiktaş Anatolian High School is one of Turkey's most well-established educational institutions, located in the Beşiktaş district of Istanbul. Sarkis Balyan was built for Abdulaziz in 1871.The building was an addition to the Çırağan Palace and later used as a harem room.

Beşiktaş Anatolian High School building is one of the most beautiful examples of the Ottoman Empire's 19th-century architecture with its plan and decoration. Its original exterior cladding, rooms, and ceiling decorations still preserve their old form. Murad V, who was deposed from the sultanate on the grounds that he was insane, lived in prison for 28 years in today's Beşiktaş Anatolian High School building. Murad V’s room is now used as the Beşiktaş Anatolian High School canteen.

After the abolition of the caliphate in 1924, the building served Ministry of National Education (Turkey) as the 21st school of the Republic of Turkey. Beşiktaş High School was opened in the 1937-1938 academic year in Akaretler as a mixed school with only the 1st and 2nd grades of middle school in the building where the old Anafartalar Secondary School is located. Then, Beşiktaş High School moved into its current building in the 1940-1941 academic year and was named Beşiktaş 2nd Girls' Secondary School.

Upon the abolition of Beşiktaş 1st Secondary School during the time of the Minister of National Education Tahsin Banguoğlu, some of the male students were transferred to Beşiktaş High School, and the school was transformed into a mixed high school. After the school was named "Beşiktaş Girls High School" in the 1959-1960 academic year, the school transformed into a mixed high school in the 1993-1994 academic year, and its name was changed to "Beşiktaş High School" again.

In 1995, the entire garden area of the school was landscaped, and historical trees were taken under protection. The coast, which was filled after 1980, was fortified in 2001.

Beginning from the 2005-2006 academic year, Beşiktaş High School was given the status of Anatolian High School and was named "Beşiktaş Anatolian High School."

As of the 2020-2021 academic year, the Preparatory (English) + 4-Year Program has started.

Starting from the 2022-2023 academic year, the AP (Advanced Placement) System will be implemented.

== School's Base Entrance Points ==
2022	467.85	1.21
2021	448.2120	1.22
2020	459.7828	1.11
2019	475.4080	1.47
2018	406.8636	1.97
2017	488.0999	2.69

== Teaching Language ==
The language of instruction at Beşiktaş Anatolian High School is Turkish. In addition, English (mandatory) and German (compulsory) classes are also offered at the school.

== Beşiktaş Anatolian High School International Sports Festival ==
As part of the Commemoration of Atatürk, Youth and Sports Day week, in the festival, which was held for the first time in 2016 by Beşiktaş Anatolian High School Sports Club, Competitions are organized in the branches of volleyball, basketball, football, and sailing. Many schools attended the festival from Istanbul, as well as from various countries such as Macedonia and Israel. In addition, on May 17, 2016, after the school's music groups and alums, Pinhani gave a concert.

== BalGirişimFest ==
BALGirişimFest is the school's first-ever entrepreneurship festival, which was held in 2022. This festival provides an opportunity to bring together celebrated entrepreneurs and host a vibrant event filled with festivities.

== Bosphorus Robotics 8158 FRC Team ==
Founded in 2019 to represent Beşiktaş Anatolian High School, Bosphorus Robotics 8158 is a robotics team that competes in FIRST Robotics Tournaments. The team qualified to represent Turkey in the FIRST SBPLI Long Island Regional #1 tournament in the USA in 2020. In 2022, the team became a Finalist in the Bosphorus Regional, held in Istanbul.

== See also ==
- List of schools in Istanbul
