= Gazi Anatolian High School =

Coordinates: 39.8653°N 32.7136°E

- Sögütözü, Ankara; Turkey

Information
- Type: Public
- Established: 1984
- Headmaster: Mehmet Öztürk
- Enrollment: 1200
- Colors: Red, blue, white
- Website: gazianadolu.meb.k12.tr

Gazi Anatolian High School (Turkish: Gazi Anadolu Lisesi) is a co-educational Anatolian High School in Ankara, Turkey. It was founded under the name "Söğütözü Anatolian High School" in 1984. In 1986, the school moved to its current location and adopted its current name. The emblem of the school is the signature of Mustafa Kemal Atatürk, which is worn every Gazi student on their uniform. In the university entrance exams, the average success rate in its own type and in Turkey as a whole is 82.3%; in 2003, it ranked first in Turkey in the numerical field and in the fields of mathematics, physics, chemistry, chemistry and biology.

Gazi students average in the top percentile of all students taking the Turkish high school entrance exam. Gazi students score outstanding results in Student Selection Exam, thus ranking Gazi one of the most successful Anatolian high schools in Turkey.

Gazi is one of the largest primary education institutions in Ankara, with an administrative and classroom building, a gymnasium/sports center, a canteen and a student dormitory on campus. The primary language of instruction in the school is Turkish; however, students take obligatory English lessons as a foreign language.
