= Kartal Anatolian High School =

High school in Istanbul, Turkey

Coordinates: 40°54′52″N 29°10′08″E

- Kartal Anadolu Lisesi

Location
- Cevizli Mh. Karabük Cd. No 10; Kartal, Istanbul; Turkey

Information
- School type: Anatolian High School
- Founded: 1985
- Principal: Bahriye Şenaras
- Newspaper: Gençkal
- Website: https://kartalanadolu.meb.k12.tr/

Kartal Anatolian High School (Turkish: Kartal Anadolu Lisesi) is a selective-entry Anatolian High School in the Kartal district of Istanbul, Turkey.

The school was founded in 1985 originally to serve the children of Turkish families that had lived in Germany. Its premises have a capacity of 500 students. Entry to the school requires passing the national LGS (Liseye Geçiş Sınavı) tests for high school admission with a result within a specific percentile that is set annually.

The school offers 4 years of standard education and a year of preparation for new students in language. The language of instruction is Turkish. Courses in English and German as foreign languages are offered, including for the German B1 and C1 certificate examinations.

The school magazine Kalender includes contributions from students.

== Controversies ==
In 2016, the emblem of the school, which featured Atatürk and the Turkish flag, was changed without the community's knowledge. In response, students and alumni initiated a social media campaign and collected signatures. As a result, the school administration announced that they would continue using the original emblem.

== Student activities ==
=== Basketball ===
The school has a basketball team that regularly participates in regional tournaments.
