= Timuçin Esen =

Turkish actor

- Born: Mahmut Timuçin Esen; 14 August 1973 (age 52); Adana, Turkey
- Education: Ankara University Mimar Sinan Fine Arts University
- Occupation: Actor
- Years active: 2003–present
- Spouse: Bilge Türe (m. 2012)
- Children: 2

Mahmut Timuçin Esen (born 14 August 1973) is a Turkish actor.

== Biography ==
Timuçin Esen was born on 14 August 1973 in Adana to lawyer parents. After studying at TED Ankara College, he went to study theatre at Ankara University state conservatory and ultimately graduated from Mimar Sinan Fine Arts University. He then went to the California Institute of the Arts in the United States to do his master's degree. He received coaching from acting teacher Larry Moss.

After returning to Turkey, he played in the series Gurbet Kadını alongside Fatma Girik. Esen starred in the film Gönül Yarası alongside Şener Şen for which he won both a Golden Orange and a SİYAD award. He had first main tv role in hit police series Hırsız Polis.

== Filmography ==
Film
Year	Title	Role	Notes
2003	Deliyle Geçen Gece	Benli Taci	
2004	Yazı Tura	Soldier	
2005	Gönül Yarası	Halil	
2011	Labirent	Fikret	
2012	Kumun Tadı	Hamit	
2013	Senin Hikayen	Hakan	
2017	Martıların Efendisi	Şakir	
2019	Müslüm	Müslüm Gürses	
2024	O Da Bir Şey Mi?	Levent	
2024	Zaferin Rengi	Topkapılı Cambaz	
Television
Year	Title	Role	Network
2003–2005	Gurbet Kadını	Hakkı Boyatlı	Show TV
2005–2007	Hırsız Polis	Commissioner Çınar	Kanal D
2013–2014	Vicdan	Yunus	Kanal D
2014–2015	Gönül İşleri	Yılmaz	Star TV
2016–2017	Bodrum Masalı	Faryalı	Kanal D
2018–2019	Gülperi	Kadir Aydın	Show TV
2019–2021	Hekimoğlu	Ateş Hekimoğlu	Kanal D
2023	Tetikçinin Oğlu	Korkmaz	FOX
2024	Kalpazan	Adem Dönmez	Show TV
Streaming series
Year	Title	Role	Platform
2022	Ben Gri	Fuat	Disney+
