= Ankara (Anatolian) High School =

Turkish school

Ankara Anadolu High School
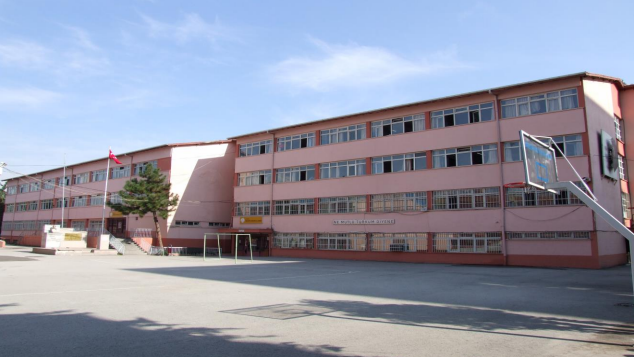

Location
- Ankara; Turkey
- Coordinates: 39.9573957°N 32.8515209°E

Information
- Established: 1981
- Head teacher: Seyfi Kayiş
- Website: ankaraal.meb.k12.tr

Ankara Anatolian High School (Turkish: Ankara Anadolu Lisesi (AAL)) is a high school that began as a lycée in 1981. The medium of instruction was German and French until the education year 2012-13. The medium of instruction was converted to English since 2012-13.
