= Tokat Arif Nihat Asya High School =

- Tokat Arif Nihat Asya Lisesi

Location
- İbni Kemal Cad., 2216 Sok. Karşıyaka Mah. Tokat; Turkey
- Coordinates: 40.34312°N 36.54187°E

Information
- Established: 2005
- Founder: Musa Günay
- Principal: Abdurrahman Yıldırım (2007–present)
- Area: 3,628 m^{2} (39,050 ft^{2})

Tokat Arif Nihat Asya High School (Turkish: Tokat Arif Nihat Asya Lisesi) is a high school in Tokat, Turkey. The school is named after the Turkish nationalist poet Arif Nihat Asya (1904–1975). Education is mainly in Turkish and English. The school covers an area of 3,628 m^{2} (39,050 ft^{2}).

== History ==
The high school was founded in 2005 by Musa Günay, who became the first principal. After his leaving the school in winter 2006, Ayhan Kaymak took over the post. The current principal is Abdurrahman Yıldırım, who serves in this position since 2007.

== Administration ==
- Ayhan KAYMAK, Principal (2007–present)
