= Mehran Broumand =

Iranian producer and director (born 1974)

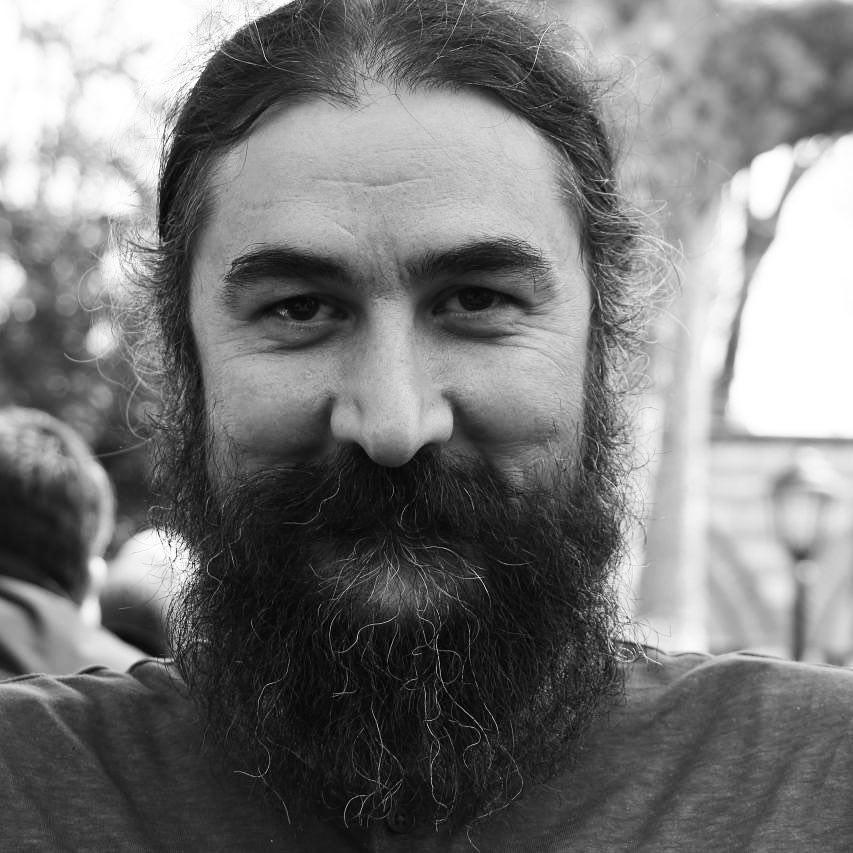
- Born: April 9, 1974 (age 51); Tehran, Iran
- Occupations: Director, producer
- Years active: 1980–present

Mehran Broumand (Persian: مهران برومند،; born in April 1974) is an Iranian producer and director.

== Career ==
Broumand started his artistic activity with following works. he has taken part in several films and TV series in Iran:

- As a director group in Mojassame movie in 1992 directed by Ebrahim Vahid zadeh
- programming manager in Paeez-E-Boland drama series directed by Manocher Asgarinasab 1992-1994
- As a directing group in Hamle Be H3 in 1994 (movie)
- As a director's first assistant in Lak Posht movie in 1996
- As a director's first assistant and programming manager in Istgah drama series directed by Manochehr Asgari nasab in 1997
- Programming manager in The Men of Angelos drama series directed by Farjollah Salahshoor in 1998
- Director's first assistant and programming manager in Parvandehaye Majool drama series directed by Jamal Shorjeh
- Dirsctor's first assistant in Gharche Sammi movie in 2001
- Director's first assistant and programming manager Tofang sarpor 1999-2001 directed by Amarollah Ahmadju
- Director's first assistant Shahe Khamoosh movie 2002
- Director's first assistant in Roozhaye Be Yad Mandani in two seasons, 2003-2005 directed by Homayun SHahnavz and Tooraj Mansoori
- Director's first Assistant in Enekas movie, in 2008

== Filmography ==
=== Television ===
- The Men of Angelos (1998)
- Parvandehaye Majool (2001)
- Tofang sarpor (2001)
- Roozhaye Be Yad Mandani (2005)
- Mokhtarnameh (2010)
- Intoxicated by Love (2023)

=== Film ===
- Mojassame (1992)
- Paeez-E-Boland (1994)
- Lak Posht (1996)
- Istgah (1997)
- Gharche Sammi (2001)
- Shahe Khamoosh (2001)
- Enekas (2008)
- Golden Tooth (2015)

== See also ==
- Iranian New Wave
- Cinema of Iran
