= Private Ege High School =

Private Ege High School (Turkish: Özel Ege Lisesi) is a K-12 school in Bornova, İzmir, Turkey.

== History ==
Private Ege High School, formerly known as Private Anayurt High School, was founded on July 3, 1987, in Konak. The school moved to Kahramanlar in 1988 receiving its current name as Private Ege High School due to the changes in its administration and moved to Pınarbaşı in 1990. Since 1996, it has been located in Evka-3 where it covers 20,500 square meters area. The class of 1992 was the school's first graduates. It is a K-12 school that provides education to students from kindergarten to university.

In the following decade of its foundation, the school went through a number of changes in its administration, and it was taken over by the Eraslan family in 1998. Since then Yansı Eraslan has been the president of Private Ege High School.

Private Ege High School has been a pioneer in many different areas related to education such as initiating the system of branching out into subjects in primary curriculum and implementing ‘Reading Literature Project’ and ‘Yearly Projects’ in all grades. In 2001, Private Ege High School was ranked the first at the university entrance exam among all the public and private Anatolian lichools in İzmir. Maintaining its academic achievements throughout the years, Private Ege High School remained at the top of school league tables. In 2002, it regained its first rank among all the schools in İzmir except the science high schools -well known with their emphasis on math and science- in subscores of Turkish-Mathematics, Social Sciences and Mathematics-Science. Furthermore, ranking in the top first percent in subscores of Turkish-Mathematics, Social Sciences and Mathematics-Science, the school was ranked the second among 214 private Anatolian high schools throughout Turkey.

Initiating its international programs and studies in 2002, Private Ege High School was one of the two schools which participated in the Model United Nations Conference at Harvard University. Becoming prominent in its academic achievements, the school was ranked the first at the university entrance exam in 2003 among the Anatolian high schools in İzmir in the fields of Turkish-Mathematics, Social Sciences and Mathematics-Science and took the first place among 226 private Anatolian high schools throughout Turkey.

Private Ege High School was the first high school that was invited from İzmir to the Global Young Leaders Conference in the US in 2003. In addition, Private Ege was one of the first educational institutions conducting three different Comenius Projects in collaboration with many European partners in the same year. The Comenius Project which was conducted in partnership with Denmark was the first language project in Turkey.

Achieving 100% success rate in university placement in 2005, Private Ege High School ranked the first in İzmir. In the same year, the school won the Jury's Special Award in the Aegean Quality Awards Competition, which was repeated three years later. Private Ege was also the first school to win the Quality Award in the education and services sector.

Achieving 94% success rate in university entrance exam in 2006 and 98% in 2007, Private Ege High School ranked first in İzmir for two consecutive years.

In 2009, Private Ege High School got the first place out of 362 schools in İzmir with 100% success rate in university placement. Throughout the country, the school took the eighth place with Mathematics-Science subscore among 297 private Anatolian high schools.

In addition, out of 69 public and private Anatolian high schools in İzmir, it took first place with the 2010 scores of YGS 1–2, YGS 3-4 and YGS 5-6 (all are the first stage subscores before accession to college). Out of 312 private Anatolian high schools in Turkey, Private Ege was also ranked first in LYS with Science-Mathematics and Turkish-Mathematics scores (second stage subscores of Undergraduate Placement Exam). It was ranked second in the complete Anatolian High School League Tables consisting of 1.111 public and private Anatolian high schools.

In 2010, the school founded the Science Committee under the administration of co-chairs who hold Ph.D. degrees in Biochemistry and Mathematics. Same year Private Ege High School was a top-ranked school based on YGS-3, YGS-4 and YGS-5 scores out of 70 public and private Anatolian high schools in İzmir. Last but not least, in the league tables of private Anatolian high schools in the country, Private Ege High School has been placed between the second and the sixth ranks in all types of scores among 334 schools in YGS and 329 schools in LYS.

Private Ege High School celebrated its 25th anniversary in 2012. This was also the year in which the school radio first started its test broadcast.
