= Aksu Science High School =

Location
- Antalya; Turkey
- Coordinates: 36.95045°N 30.84806°E

Information
- Type: Public
- Established: 1940
- Principal: Mustafa KÖSEOĞLU
- Website: aksufenlisesi.meb.k12.tr

Aksu Science High School (Turkish: Aksu Fen Lisesi) was originally founded in 1940 as Aksu Village Institute (Turkish: Aksu Köy Enstitüsü). The education in this school is mostly in Turkish. The first foreign language is English and the second foreign language is German. The school became an "Science High School" in 2014.
