= Hüseyin Avni Sözen Anatolian High School =

Location
- MütevelliÇeşme Street; Istanbul, Koşuyolu, Üsküdar; Turkey; 41.0138469°N 29.0386841°E

Information
- Type: State Governed Anatolian School
- Motto: "Our Aim Is Being Aim Of Everyone",
- Established: 1984
- Founder: Hikmet Özarslan
- Principal: Adem Sağır
- Faculty: 50
- Grades: Prep. + 9–13
- Enrollment: 602(2025 April)
- Campus: 47,445 m^{2} (510,690 sq ft)
- Colors: White and maroon
- Nickname: HASAL
- Website: hasal.k12.tr

Hüseyin Avni Sözen Anatolian High School (Turkish: Hüseyin Avni Sözen Anadolu Lisesi, HASAL) is a highly selective Anatolian School (preparatory through 13th grades; although it used to be an English MoI selective school from 6th to 12th grade until 2000), similar to grammar schools in U.K., located in Üsküdar, an Asian side town of Istanbul. Founded in 1984, the school has a history of distinguished scholarship and is particularly well known for the strength of its English language study program.

HASAL is one of the very few public schools in Turkey with a preparatory year of intensive English programme, and one of the few schools with a campus-wide Wi-Fi network.

HASAL is considered one of the top college preparatory schools in the country and has a strong academic record with a high proportion of pupils proceeding to Boğaziçi, İTÜ and other prominent universities in Turkey and abroad. HASAL received the Ragib Devres Award for graduating the highest number of students in the first 200, who chose ITU for their higher education. The school achieved some remarkable success in nationwide mathematics, science and sports competitions, including several volleyball, basketball, and chess championship cups in its reserve. HASAL teachers have also received several honorary rewards, one of which was the Ragib Devres Prize awarded to chemistry teacher Gökşin Sumra.

Amongst HASAL's reunion days, HASAL Kış Yemeği, HASAL Bahar Yemeği, HASAL Talaş Böreği Günü and MusicDay can be listed.

== List of Headmasters ==
- Hikmet Özaslan - 1984-2003
- Hüseyin Yalçın - 2003-2005
- Muhterem Yıldız - 2005-2010
- Mehmet Keskin - 2010 - 2015
- Haluk Değirmenci- 2015 - 2024
- Adem Sağır - 2024 - ...

== Extracurricular Activities and Student Clubs ==
There are 21 active clubs in the school, some of which are;

- Reading Competitions Organisation Committee
- Brain Teasers Society
- Model United Nations (HASALMUN) hasalmun.org
- Dancing
- Foreign Languages and Cultures Club
- PCM (Physics-Chemistry-Maths) Society
- Mathematics Olympiads and Research
- Photography&Cinema (HASALSINEMA)
- Theatre Club
- Chess Club
- Literature Club
- Student Government
- Hasal Debate Club(HasalMünazara)

== Sports at HASAL ==
HASAL has competing teams in

- Volleyball
- Basketball
- Chess
- Scrabble
- Fencing
- Archery
- Rugby

Also, the school has the largest in-door sports complex of the Anatolian side Istanbul where students can do physical activities in team sports, gymnastics and fencing.
