= Vehbi Dinçerler Science High School =

High school in Gaziantep, Turkey

- Turkish: Vehbi Dinçerler Fen Lisesi
- Gaziantep; Turkey

Information
- School type: High school
- Established: 1985; 41 years ago
- Founder: Abdülkadir Aksu
- Website: gvdfl.meb.k12.tr

Vehbi Dinçerler Science High School (Turkish: Vehbi Dinçerler Fen Lisesi, abbreviated as VDFL) is a high school in Gaziantep, Turkey. It was founded in 1985 by Abdulkadir Aksu, former governor of the City, interior minister of Turkey.
