= Ankara Atatürk Anatolian High School =

Ankara Atatürk Anadolu Lisesi

Location
- Bahçelievler, Ankara; Turkey
- 39.93402°N 32.81774°E

Information
- Motto: Bir dünya lisesi
- Established: 1971
- Principal: Züleyha Hızlı
- Website: aaal.meb.k12.tr

Ankara Atatürk Anadolu Lisesi (Ankara Atatürk Anatolian High School), established in 1971, is one of the oldest Anatolian High Schools of Ankara and Turkey. It is located in the Emniyet neighborhood.

The high school selects its students with the standardized test of National Anatolian High Schools Examination. It is one of the leading schools in Turkey performing significant success at the National University Entrance Examination.
