= Seyhan Rotary Anatolian High School =

High school in Turkey

Seyhan Rotary Anatolian High School (Turkish: Seyhan Rotary Anadolu Lisesi) was established on August 29, 1996, at Yüreğir, Adana by Seyhan Rotary Club. The principal of the school is Abdussamed Emiroğulları. Education languages of school are English, Turkish and German.
