= Malatya Science High School =

- Malatya; Turkey

Information
- Type: Public Secondary
- Motto: "It is a privilege to be a Malatya Science High School graduate"
- Established: 1986
- Founder: Yahya Ozkan
- Principal: Murat Donmez
- Faculty: 34
- Grades: 9–12
- Enrollment: 384
- Campus: 39,625m^{2}/394,227ft^{2}
- Colors: Black and Gold
- Mascot: Bear
- Admissions: Competitive Examination
- Tuition: None
- Type: Boarding School
- Website: http://www.mfl.k12.tr/

Malatya Science High School (Malatya Fen Lisesi in Turkish) is a public boarding school located in Malatya, Turkey. It was established in 1986 by Yahya Ozkan with the approbation of Ministry of National Education. The school has a curriculum concentrated on natural sciences and mathematics. The admissions to the science high school are through a competitive national high school entrance examination.

== History ==
Science High Schools (Turkish: Fen Lisesi - FL) are public boarding high schools in Turkey aimed to train exceptionally talented students on a curriculum concentrated on natural sciences and mathematics. The first science high school was established in 1964 in Ankara with a funding from the Ford Foundation. The school was modeled after the American counterparts like the Bronx High School of Science. Due to the considerable success of its alumni in all aspects of professional life and academia, science high school concept is spread around the country and now there are public and private science high schools in all major cities. Being one of them Malatya Science High School is now one of the most prominent science high schools in Turkey.

Malatya Science High School was founded in 1986 with the approbation of Ministry of National Education in a campus once served as Faculty of Education and Academy of Economics & Administrative Sciences at Inonu University.

== Education ==
Malatya Science High School is ranked within the top 50 high schools in Turkey based on the success of its students in the national university entrance examination. The school admits 96 students annually. The prospective students are selected upon their performance in the national high school entrance examination with a 99.2 percentile ranking.

The language of education is Turkish with English as a second language. Emphasis is given to mathematics and natural sciences including physics, chemistry and biology in the curriculum. There are also selective courses on advanced topics in physics, chemistry, biology, mathematics and analytical geometry.

The school has an optional boarding system with a comprehensive study program. These programs include four hours of etude sections every day divided into morning and afternoon sessions under the supervision of faculty members.

== Campus ==
The campus is located in the west side of Malatya. In its relatively large and green campus it has two boarding houses, equipped with kitchens, laundry facilities, leisure and TV rooms, several study rooms, several laboratories, quarters, a library and a gymnasium. The school building has 14 classrooms, 3 physics, 1 chemistry, 1 biology and 1 computer science laboratories. The library has over 4000 listings.

== Olympics achievements ==
Since the establishment of Malatya Science High School, several students have successfully represented in National Natural Sciences and Mathematics Olympics held by TUBITAK. Below is a list of student achievements in National Olympics in 2008.

H. Armağan Gurdal and Murat Gunaltili (Mathematics, National Appreciation Prize)
Mert Atmaca (Physics, Regional Gold Medal)
M. Ilker Karagedik (Computer Science, Regional Silver Medal)
Caglar Yesilyurt (Computer Science, Regional Bronze Medal)
Ezgi Gungordu (Chemistry, Regional Bronze Medal)

Achievements in International Olympics;
Eren Bali (Mathematics, International Silver Medal at 42nd. IMO; June 29 -July 12, 2001 in Washington DC/USA )

== Notable alumni ==
- Eren Bali (Year of Graduation : 2001), co-founder of Udemy
