= Istanbul Okan University =

Private university in İstanbul, Turkey

- İstanbul Okan Üniversitesi
- Motto: The university closest to business life
- Type: Private (foundation) university
- Established: 1999
- Founder: Bekir Okan
- Rector: Prof. Dr. Ibrahim Alinur Büyükaksoy
- Students: 17,096
- Location: Istanbul, Turkey
- Campus: Tuzla-Akfırat
- Website: www.okan.edu.tr

Istanbul Okan University is a private university located in Akfırat, Tuzla, Istanbul, Turkey. It was established by Bekir Okan in 1999 and started its educational activities in the 2003–2004 academic year.

== Academic units ==
=== Faculties ===
- Faculty of Medicine
- Faculty of Pharmacy
- Faculty of Dentistry
- Faculty of Education
- Faculty of Art, Design and Architecture
- Faculty of Business and Management Sciences
- Faculty of Humanities and Social Sciences
- Faculty of Law
- Faculty of Engineering and Natural Sciences
- Faculty of Health Sciences
- Faculty of Applied Sciences

=== Conservatory ===
- Theatre
- Music

=== Institutes ===
- Institute of Science
- Institute of Health Sciences
- Institute of Social Sciences

=== Vocational Schools ===
- Vocational School
- Vocational School of Health Services

=== Departments under Rectorate ===
- Atatürk's Principles and History of Turkish Revolution
- Turkish Language Department

=== Education Centers ===
- Confucius Institute
- Culinary Arts Center
- Russian Culture Center
- Continuing Education Center (OKSEM)
- Foreign Language Examination Centers
