= Anatolian high school =

- Turkey

Information
- Type: High school

Anatolian high school or Anadolu high school (Turkish: Anadolu lisesi) refers to a category of public and private high schools in Turkey that typically admit students based on their scores from the nationwide standardized High School Entrance Exam (Turkish: Liselere Geçiş Sistemi, LGS). However, admission through examination is not required for all institutions under this designation.

== History ==
The origins of Anatolian high schools date back to 1955, when six institutions, known as Maarif Kolejleri, were founded in Istanbul, İzmir, Samsun, Konya, Eskişehir, and Diyarbakır under a special law enacted by the Turkish Parliament. In the following years, additional schools were established, and in 1975, the name Anatolian high schools was officially adopted.

Anatolian high schools were originally established as an alternative to tuition-based private schools offering instruction in foreign languages. Modeled after grammar schools, Anatolian high schools were designed to provide academically rigorous education with a focus on foreign language instruction. While some were newly established, others were pre-existing public schools that were reclassified under this category.

Initially, admission to these schools was based on a competitive academic examination taken at the end of grade 5, which was then the final year of elementary education in Turkey. The program included a one-year preparatory course in a foreign language, followed by seven years of instruction at the middle and high school levels, with core subjects taught in a foreign language, typically English, French or German. This model was subsequently adopted by a number of private schools as an alternative to foreign-based institutions such as American, French, and German high schools. Additionally, one Anatolian high school was established in Baku, Azerbaijan, and another in Ashgabat, Turkmenistan.

Until 1997, instruction in Anatolian high schools was delivered primarily in foreign languages. In contrast, other public high schools in Turkey conducted all instruction in Turkish, with foreign languages offered only as elective subjects.

Between 1976 and 1993, the number of Anatolian high schools increased to 193. During this period, many existing high schools were converted into Anatolian high schools through curricular reforms and changes in the language of instruction, as part of a government initiative to improve the overall quality of secondary education. However, the rapid expansion led to a shortage of qualified teachers capable of instructing in foreign languages. In response, a major reform in 1997 shifted the language of instruction in Anatolian high schools to Turkish, while continuing to emphasize foreign language education as a subject.

The 1997 education reform also extended compulsory education in Turkey to eight years, effectively separating middle and high schools. As a result, Anatolian high schools no longer included middle school grades, and entrance examinations were adjusted accordingly to target students completing the 8th grade. Over time, the format of these exams evolved, as follows:

- 1999–2004: Liselere Geçiş Sınavı (LGS)
- 2004–2008: Ortaöğretim Kurumları Sınavı (OKS)
- 2008–2014: Seviye Belirleme Sınavı (SBS)
- 2014–2018: Temel Eğitimden Ortaöğretime Geçiş Sınavı (TEOG)
- 2018–present: Liselere Geçiş Sınavı (LGS)

== 21st century ==
The current LGS system differs from earlier models in that it is not compulsory for all students. Admission to Anatolian high schools now occurs through two pathways: students may either be placed at their nearest school based on residential address or apply to selective institutions using their LGS scores.

The number of Anatolian high schools grew substantially in the early 2000s, reaching approximately 500 schools in 2003, 1,700 in 2011, and 3,074 in 2017. However, under the revised placement system introduced in 2018, only 222 of these schools require an entrance examination for admission.

At present, all core subjects, including mathematics, physics, chemistry, and history, are taught in Turkish, with the exception of primary and secondary foreign language courses. Galatasaray High School, Kabataş Boys' High School, and Istanbul High School are among the Anatolian high schools that continue to offer a preparatory year focused on intensive foreign language instruction.

== See also ==
- List of high schools in Turkey
- Education in Turkey
