= Sınav High Schools =

Sınav High Schools Sınav Liseleri

Location
- Turkey

Information
- School type: High School
- Motto: Büyük Düşün Hedefini Yüksek Tut (Think Big, Keep Target High.)
- Language: English; German; French
- Color(s): Red and Purple
- Mascot: Eagle
- Website: sinavliseleri.com

Sınav High Schools (Sınav High School, Turkish: Sınav Liseleri or Sınav Lisesi); is a high school which provides Turkish education under the leadership of the Sınav Educational Institutions throughout Turkey. Has emerged with the experience and accumulation of the Sınav Educational Institutions since 1992, which largest, highest and most reliable educational institutions in Turkey.

The center is located in Yenimahalle. Most active in Ankara and Istanbul.

== Education ==
It started to operate in Ankara for the first time by the Sınav Educational Institutions established as a family business in 1992. It has emerged with the during publishing and course period of the Sınav Educational Institutions.

Sınav Educational Institutions are based on three core values. These values, consisting of "Follow/Responsibility, Rightness/Honesty, Empathy/Sympathy" are briefly referred to as THE OKUL at Sınav Schools. These are primarily adopted by students. School culture rises above these values and institutions are managed in the same direction.

Sınav High Schools has established an English language teaching system based on a foreign language program developed jointly with New York University and Oxford University. At Sınav High Schools, in addition to the weekly compulsory English courses in the 9th, 10th and 11th grades, foreign language education (according to the criteria of the European Language Passport) supported by distance education is given.

== See also ==
- Education in Turkey
