= KPDS =

KPDS may refer to:

- KPDS-LD, a low-power television station (channel 9, virtual 49) licensed to serve Wolcott, Indiana, United States
- YDS (Language Proficiency Test administered in Turkey)
