= Türkiye Scholarships =

Turkish scholarship program

Türkiye Scholarships Türkiye Bursları
- Founded: 1992
- Type: Government of Turkey international scholarship program
- Location: Turkey
- Product: Scholarships for international students at associate, undergraduate, master and PhD level of higher education.
- Parent organization: Presidency for Turks Abroad and Related Communities
- Website: www.turkiyeburslari.gov.tr

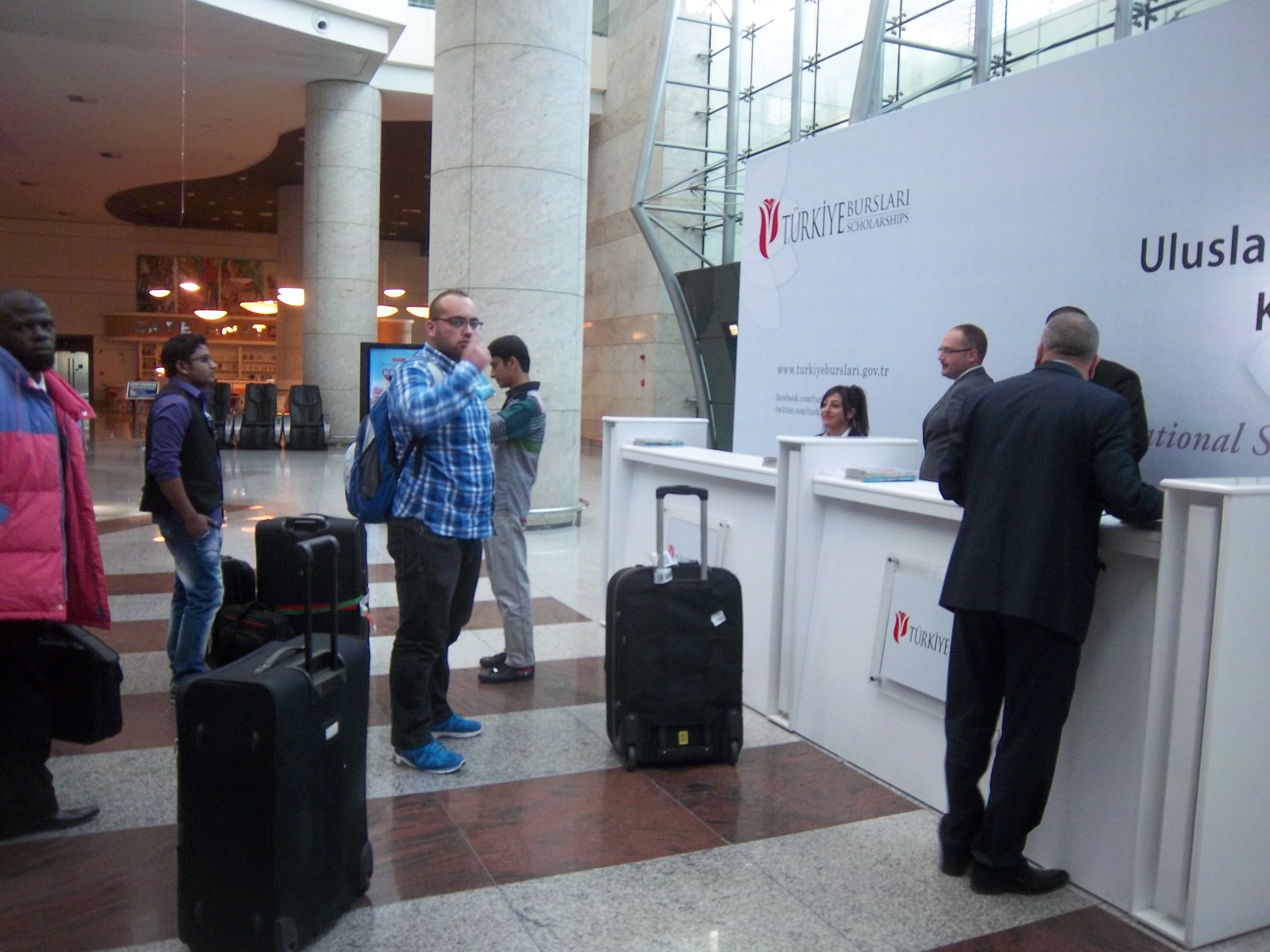
Welcome desk at Ankara Esenboğa Airport

Türkiye Scholarships (Turkish: Türkiye Bursları) is an international scholarship program funded by the Government of Turkey. With 5,000 scholarships annually the program is the largest Turkish scholarship program for international students with 165,500 applicants from 178 different countries applying in 2021. In 2017 accepted international students enrolled into 105 public and private universities in different parts of Turkey. The program was initiated in 1992 at the time of the mandate of the Turkish President Turgut Özal and was rebranded in its current form in 2012.

Some developing countries such as Nigeria organize highly competitive national exams where in the Nigerian case in 2020 over 1000 students completed for 12 spots. In 2012 initial application was completed by 16,720 Nigerian applicants while in 9 years leading up to 2012 337 students from this country were awarded scholarships.

Scholarships offered under this program are available to international students at associate, undergraduate, master, and Ph.D. level of higher education. The stated aim of the Türkiye Scholarships is to improve mutual understanding with other countries and people to people exchange.

All candidates without adequate Turkish language skills, irrespective of the language of their degree program in Turkey, attend one year-long Turkish language course.

Application materials for the scholarship can be submitted in Turkish, Arabic, English, French, Russian, Bosnian, Persian or Spanish language. In 2017 Turkish authorities announced that they will support the establishment of some 100 international alumni associations worldwide over two years.

== Scholarship Categories ==
Multiple categories of scholarships are all part of the program. While the highest levels of higher education are open for candidates from almost every part of the world, undergraduate scholarships are regionally defined and include only explicitly mentioned countries. Graduate-level scholarships include Ali Kuşçu Science and Technology Graduate Scholarship and İbni Haldun Social Sciences Graduate Scholarship. Undergraduate scholarships are regionally defined and focused on developing countries and regions with historical links with Turkey. There is no undergraduate scheme for students from the majority of developed nations in Western Europe, Anglo-America, or Australia. Undergraduate scholarship categories include a regional category for African states, Bosphorus category for Latin American and some of the non-Turkic Asian states, Balkans category for former Yugoslav states, Bulgaria, Romania, Albania and Greece, Harran category for Middle East countries and Bangladesh, Afghanistan and Tajikistan, Black Sea category for Black Sea and former East Block countries excluding Germany, Turkish Speaking Countries for Turkic countries and Anatolian category for Northern Cyprus and foreigners who already graduated in Turkey.

The student needs to return to his/her country within one year after completing his/her education in Turkey. Those who are approved to work in Turkey by being granted a work permit within the scope of the qualified workforce needed by Turkey are out of the scope of this article.

== See also ==
- Education in Turkey
- TÖMER
- List of universities in Turkey
