= YÖS exam =

Turkish university entrance exam for foreign students

The YÖS Examination (Turkish: Yabancı Uyruklu Öğrenci Sınavı) is an entrance examination designed for foreign students who wish to enroll in higher education institutions in Turkey.

Universities conduct their own versions of the exam. The test is open only for students wishing to enroll in undergraduate programs. Enrolled students who seek a transfer as well as those who wish to follow postgraduate programs apply directly to the institutions of their choice.

The YÖS Examination is composed of three tests:

- Mathematics and problems
- Intelligence
- Geometry

Approximately 9,200 candidates take the YÖS Examination annually.

== See also ==
- ÖSYM
