= Education in Turkey =

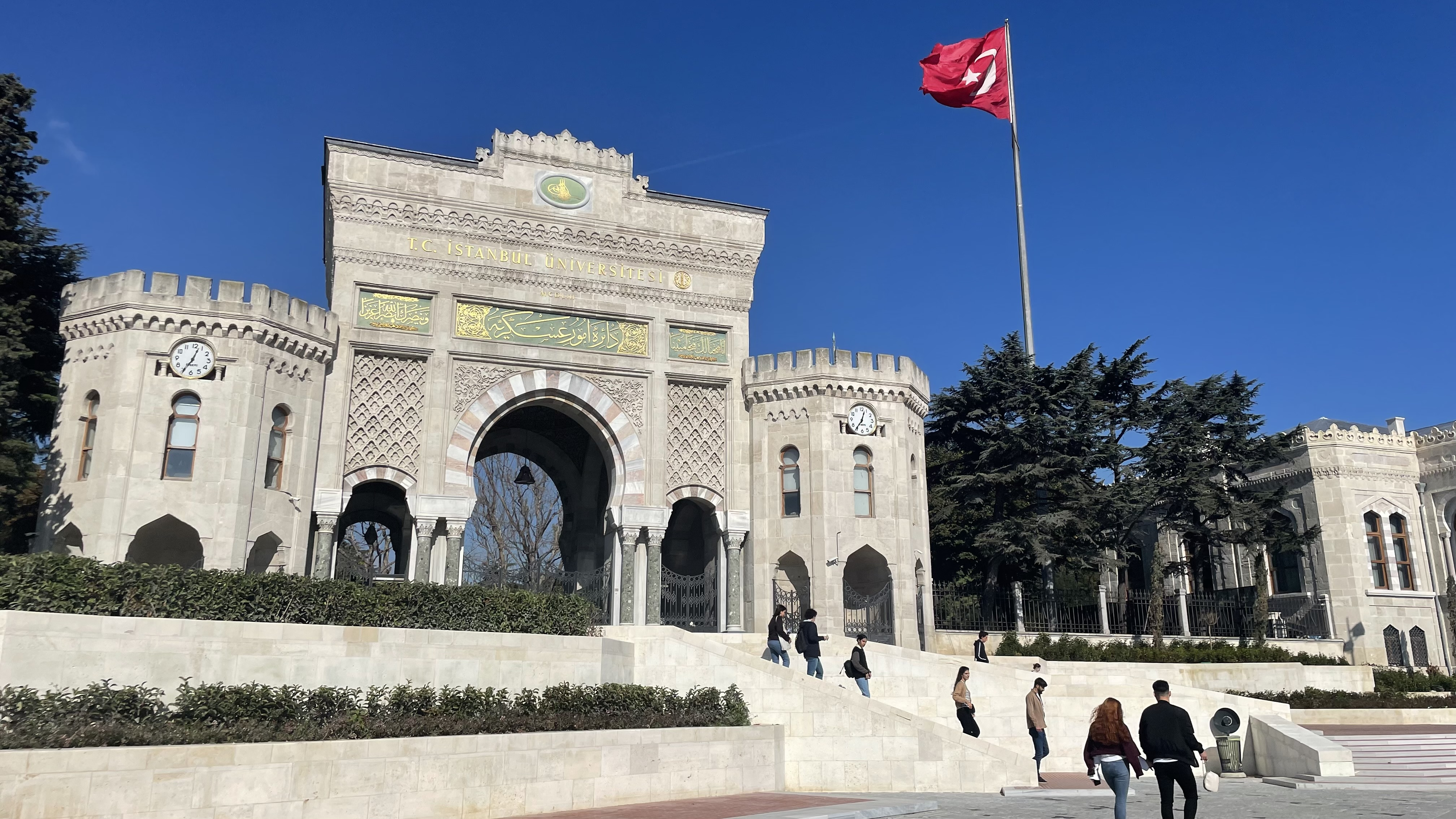
Istanbul University, founded in 1453 by Sultan Mehmed II, was previously known as Darülfünun. On 1 August 1933, as part of Atatürk's reforms, it was reorganized and became the Republic's first modern university.

Education in Turkey is governed by a national system which was established in accordance with Atatürk's Reforms. It is a state-supervised system designed to produce a skillful professional class for the social and economic institutes of the country.

Compulsory education lasts 12 years. Primary and secondary education is financed by the state and free of charge in public schools, between the ages of 6 and 19. Turkey has over 200 universities as of 2022. Students intending to pursue higher education take the ÖSYS exam, after which high school graduates are assigned to universities according to their performance.

Turkey has 97% of primary school enrollment among all eligible children as of 2019. This number has significantly dropped with the Syrian refugee crisis. Many Syrian children left school during the crisis.

In 2002, the total expenditure on education in Turkey amounted to $13.4 billion, including the state budget allocated through the National Ministry of Education and private and international funds. The share of national wealth invested in educational institutions is higher in Turkey than the average among OECD countries. The Scientific and Technological Research Council of Turkey is the main national body of R&D in Turkey.

The Human Rights Measurement Initiative (HRMI) finds that when taking into consideration Turkey's income level, the nation is achieving 61.7% of what should be possible based on its resources (income) for primary education and 86.1% for secondary education.

== History ==
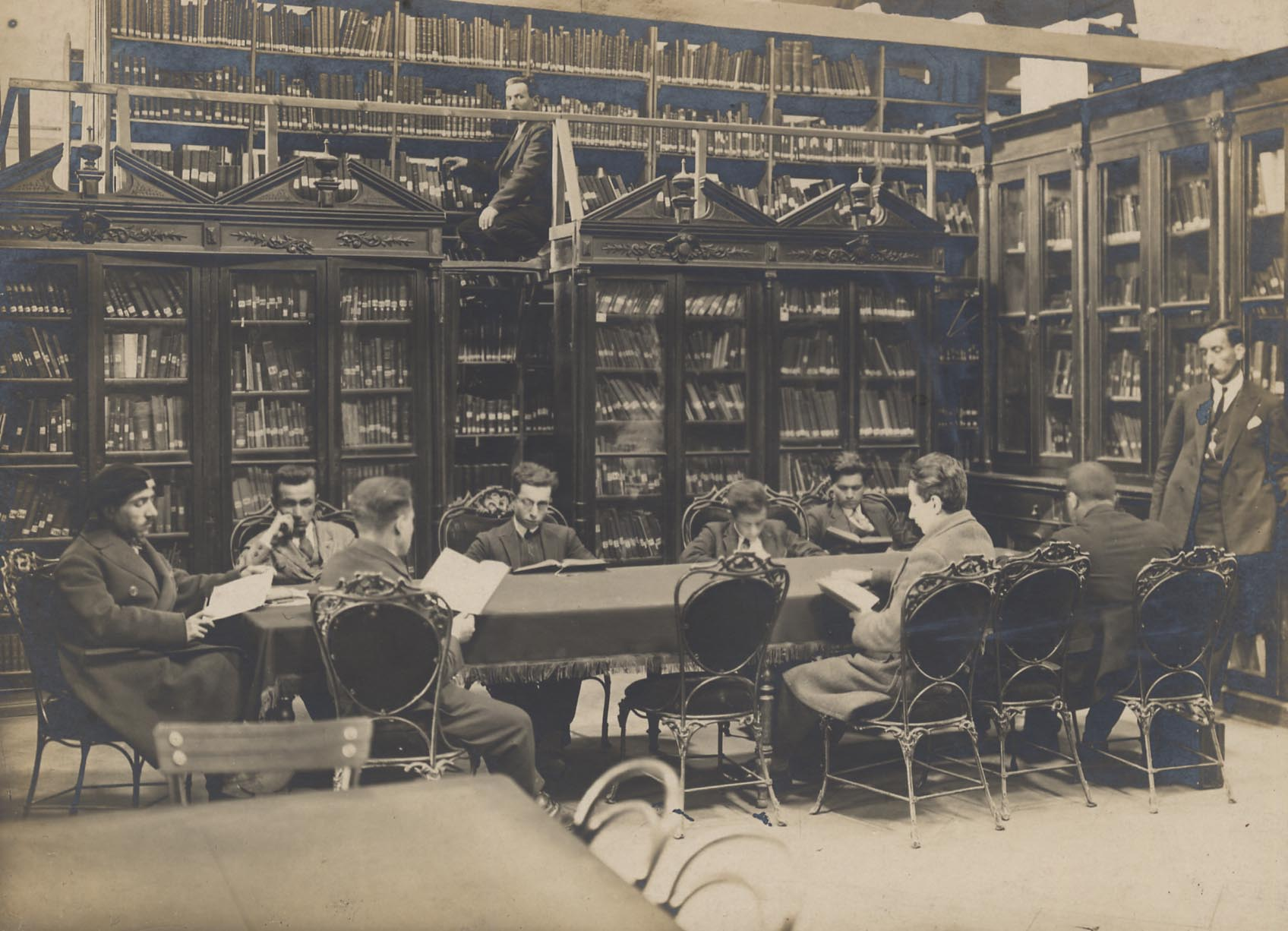
Beyazıt State Library was founded in 1884

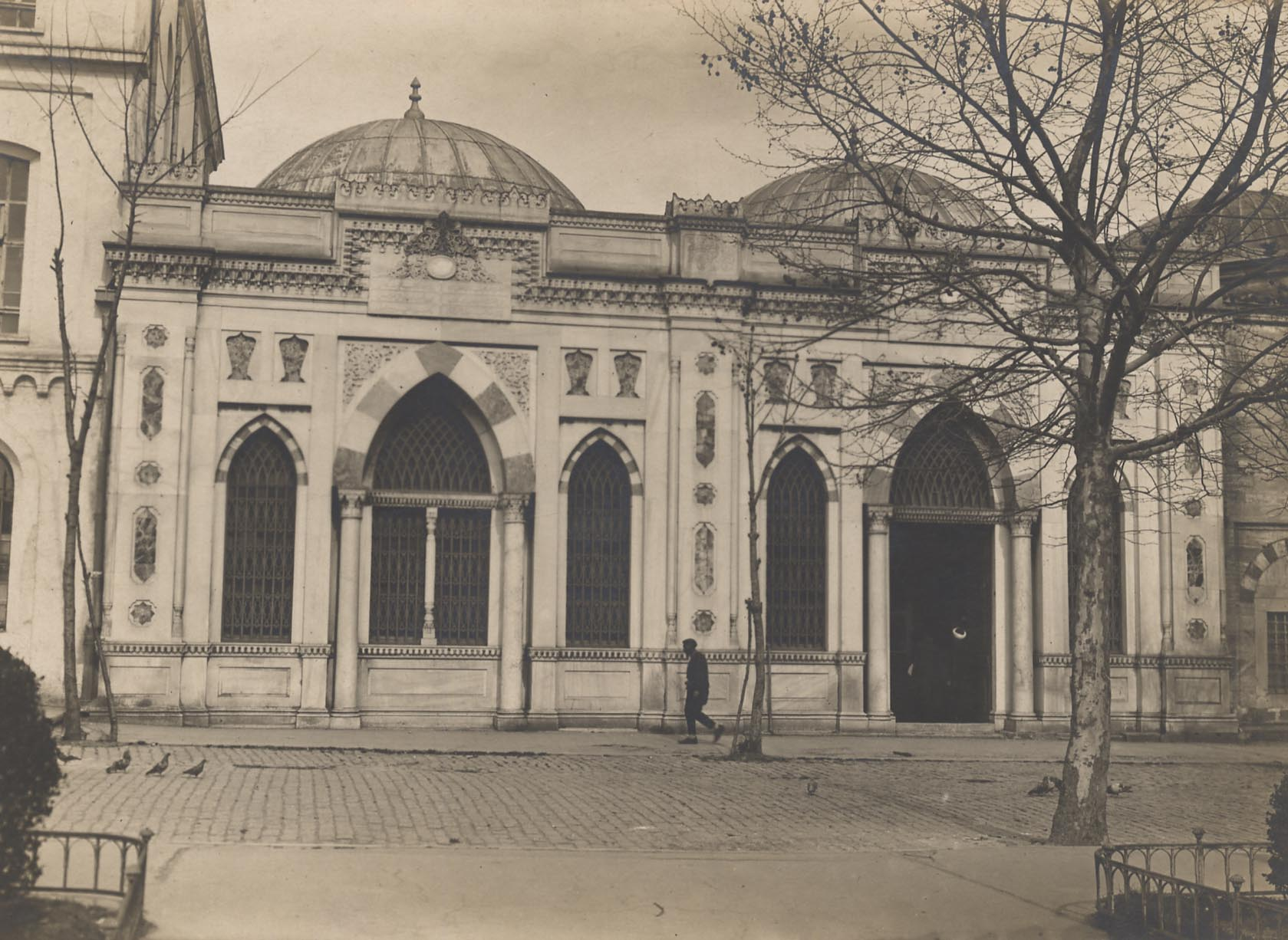
Beyazıt State Library was founded in 1884

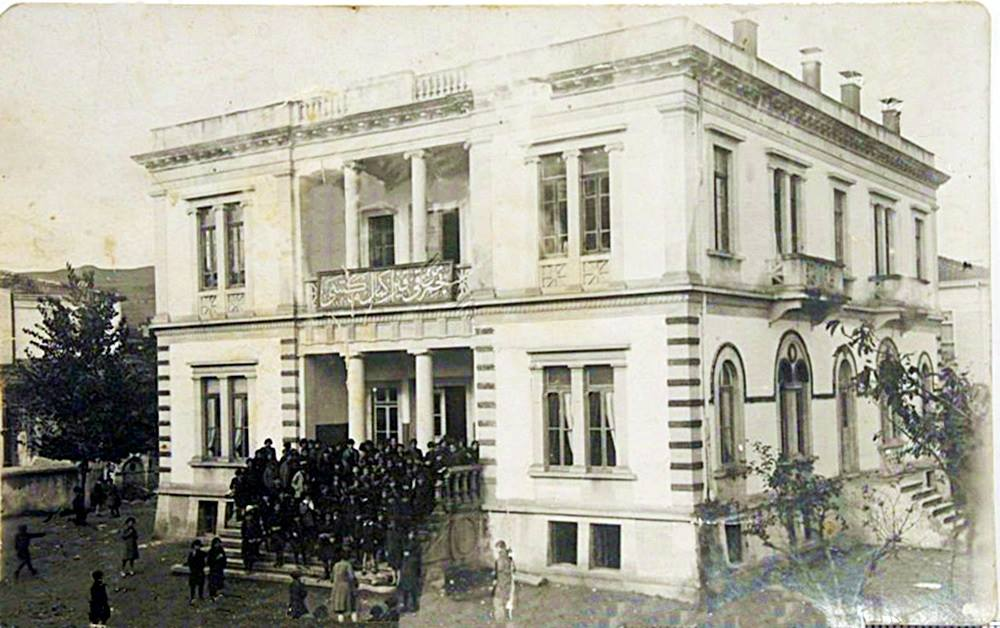
Mithatpaşa Primary School (1920s) for girls during the Ottoman Empire

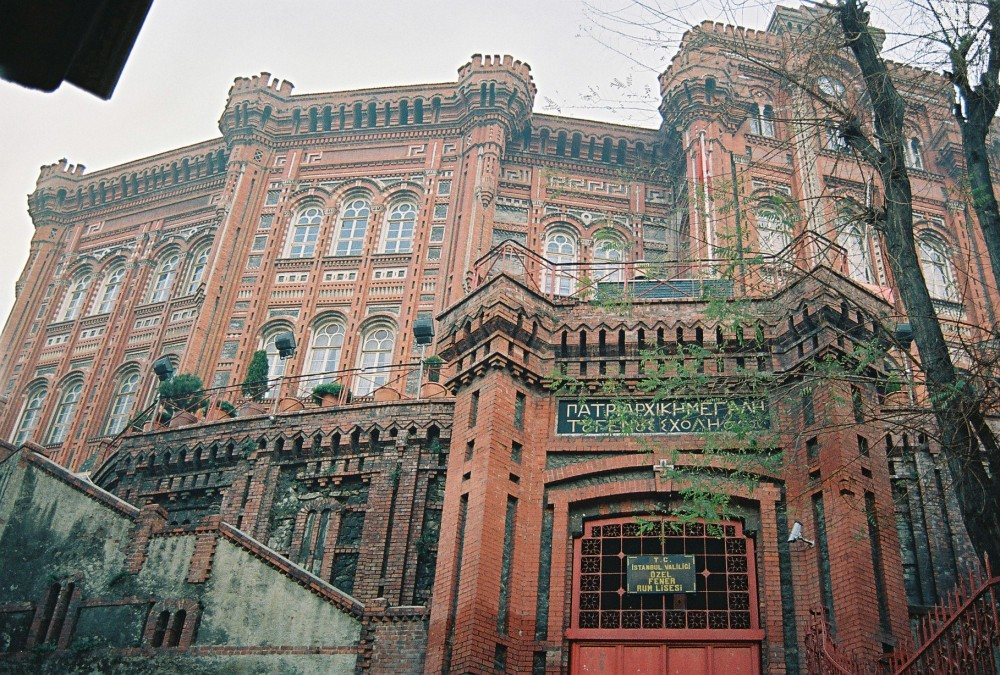
Phanar Greek Orthodox College is a Greek minority school, founded in the Ottoman Empire in 1454

After the foundation of the Turkish Republic the organization of the Ministry of Education gradually developed and was reorganized with the Law no 2287 issued in 1933. The Ministry changed its names several times. It fell under the Ministry of Culture (1935–1941) and was named Ministry of National Education, Youth, and Sports (1983–1989). Since then it has been called the Ministry of National Education. Before the Republic, education institutions were far from having a national character. Schools were organized in three separate channels which were vertical institutions independent of each other. The first and the most common in this organization were the district schools and madrasas based on the teaching of the Quran the Arabian language and memorizing, the second were the Reform schools and high schools supporting innovation and the third were the colleges and minority schools with foreign language education.

The Law of Integration of Education, no 430 was issued on 3 March 1924. With this law, the three separate channels were combined, the first one was closed, the second was developed and the third one was taken under the inspection and monitoring of the Ministry of Education. One of its aims was to apply secularism in the area of education. By the law for the Education Organization no 789 issued on 22 March 1926 the Ministry of National Education was given responsibility for defining the degrees and equalities of the public and private schools already opened or to be opened by a ministry other than the Ministry of National Education. This Law brought new arrangements such as "no school can be opened in Turkey without the permission and agreement of the Ministry of National Education" or "curricula shall be prepared by the Ministry of National Education". The vocational-technical education institutions formerly directed by local governments were put under the responsibility of the Ministry of Education.

In 1923–24, there were in Turkey, slightly more than 7,000 secondary school students, almost 3,000 high school students, some 2,000 technical school students and officially 18,000 medrese students of whom 6,000 are claimed to be actual students and the rest who registered to be excluded from military service. The population of Turkey was at that moment some 13–14 million.

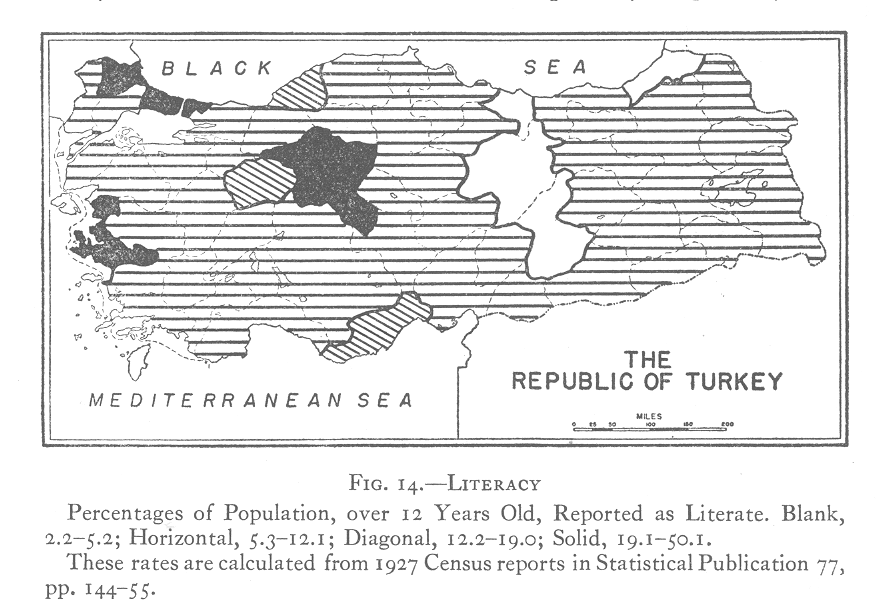
Literacy rates before the language reform in Turkey (1927). The literacy rates rose to 48.4% among males and 20.7% among females by 1950. In modern-day Turkey, this rate is 98.3%.

On 1 November 1928, Law no 1353 introducing a new Latin-based alphabet was accepted. In 1931, the Turkish Association of History, and in 1932, the Turkish Language Association were established to protect Turkish from influences of foreign languages, improve it as science suggests and prevent misuse of the Turkish language. The Republican Turkish authorities initially had twelve education districts headed by people appointed by the ministry, but later gave more power to local authorities, with education directors appointed by provincial authorities.

- there were 5,100 schools in 1923, this figure increased to 58,800 in 2001
- there were 361,500 students in 1923, this number increased to 16 million in 2001
- in 1923 12,200 teachers were employed, this number increased to 578,800 in 2001.
- in 1924 there were 479 medrese (Islamic schools); on average each one of them had approximately 1 or 1.5 hoca (teacher). All medrese were closed down that year by the law of Tevhid-i Tedrisat.

In 1938 mobile courses for women were organized in order to support the further education of the rural female population. Youths who finished primary school as well women to the age of 45 were admitted to take part in these courses. A course lastet for 8 months and then the teachers travelled on to a next village. Between 1940 and 1974 almost 305,000 women took part in 13,429 courses. About 240,000 graduated from the courses with success.

Until 1997, children in Turkey were obliged to take five years of education. The 1997 reforms introduced compulsory education for eight years. New legislation introduced in March 2012 prolonged compulsory education to 12 years (İlköğretim ve Eğitim Kanunu ile Bazı Kanunlarda Değişiklik Yapılmasına Dair Kanun).

In July 2017, the Justice and Development Party (AKP) government presented a new curriculum for schools, inter alia removing evolution theory and adding the concept of jihad as part of Islamic law in books.

== Pre-primary education ==
Pre-primary education includes the optional education of children between 36 and 72 months who are under the age of compulsory primary education. Pre-primary education institutions, independent nurseries, are opened as nursery classes and practical classes within formal and non-formal education institutions with suitable physical capacity. Services related to pre-primary education are given by nurseries, kindergartens, practical classes opened first and foremost by the Ministry of National Education and by day-centers, nursery schools, day care houses, child care houses and child care institutions opened by various ministries and institutions for care or education purposes based on the provisions of ten laws, two statutes and ten regulations. In the academic year 2001–2002, 256,400 children were being educated and 14,500 teachers were employed in 10,500 pre-primary education institutions.

== Primary education ==
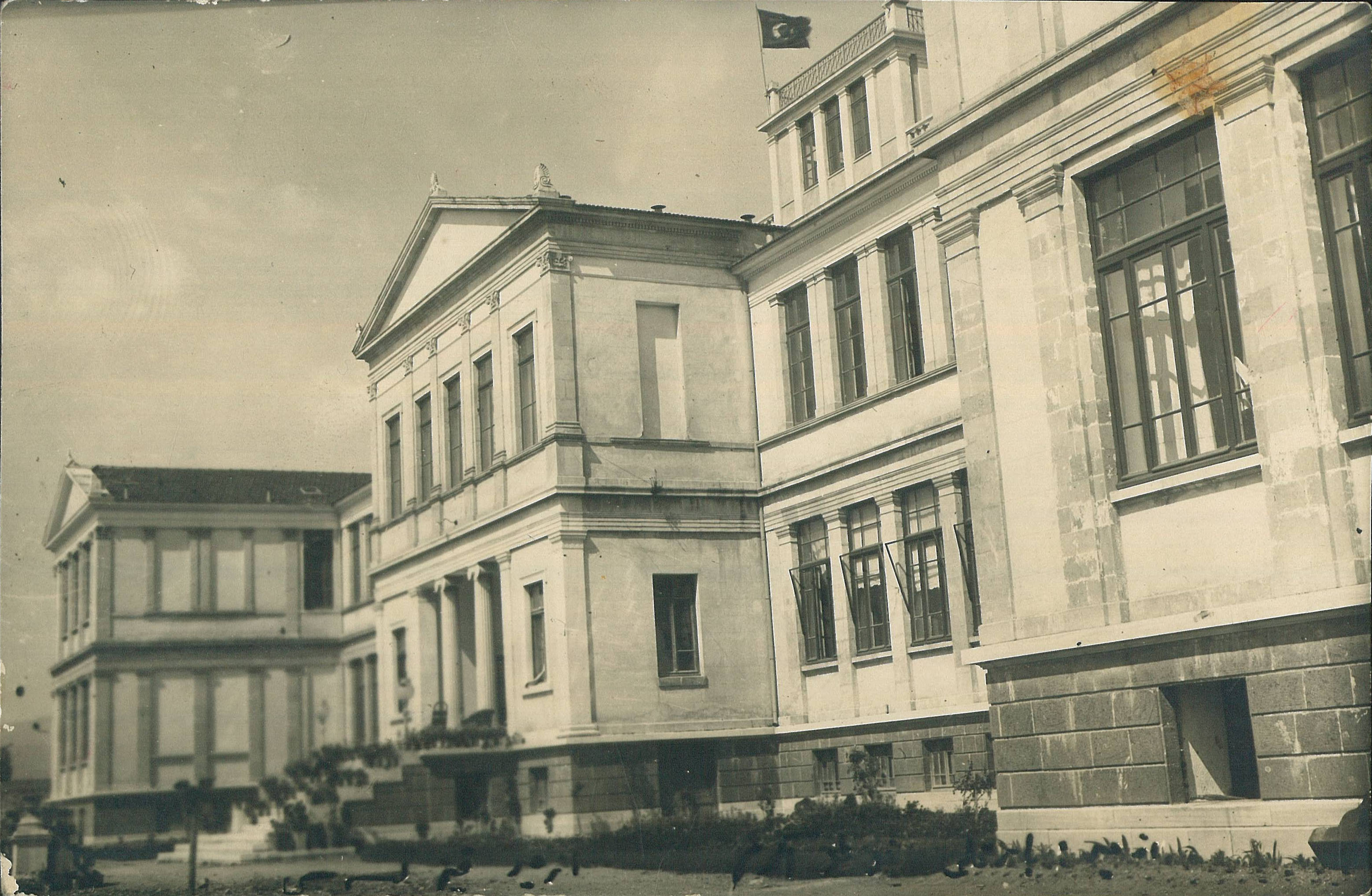
Namık Kemal Lisesi in İzmir

Primary school (Turkish: İlköğretim Okulu) lasts 8 years. Primary education covers the education and teaching directed to children between 6–14, is compulsory for all citizens, boys or girls, and is given free of charge in public schools. Primary education institutions are schools that provide eight years of uninterrupted education, at the end of which graduates receive a primary education diploma. The first four years of primary school is sometimes referred to as "First School, 1st Level" (Turkish: İlkokul 1. Kademe) but both are correct.

There are four core subjects at first, second and third grades which are Turkish, mathematics, Hayat Bilgisi (literally meaning "life knowledge"), and foreign language. At fourth grade, Hayat Bilgisi is replaced by science and social studies. The foreign language taught at schools changes from school to school. The most common one is English, while some schools teach German, French or Spanish instead of English. Some private schools teach two foreign languages at the same time.

Earlier the term "middle school" (Turkish: ortaokul) was used for the three years education to follow the then compulsory five years at "First School" (Turkish: ilkokul). Now the second four years of primary education are sometimes referred to as "First School, 2nd Level" (Turkish: İlkokul 2. Kademe) but both are correct. Primary schools may be public or private. Public schools are free but private schools' admission fees change from school to school. Foreign languages taught at private schools are usually at a higher level than at public schools since most private schools prefer hiring native speakers as teachers.

There are five core subjects at sixth and seventh grades: Turkish, mathematics, science, social studies, and foreign language. At eighth grade, social studies is replaced by "Turkish History of Revolution and Kemalism" (Turkish: T.C. İnkılap Tarihi ve Atatürkçülük).

In the academic year 2001–2002, 10.3 million students were being educated and 375,500 teachers were employed in 34,900 schools.

== Secondary education ==
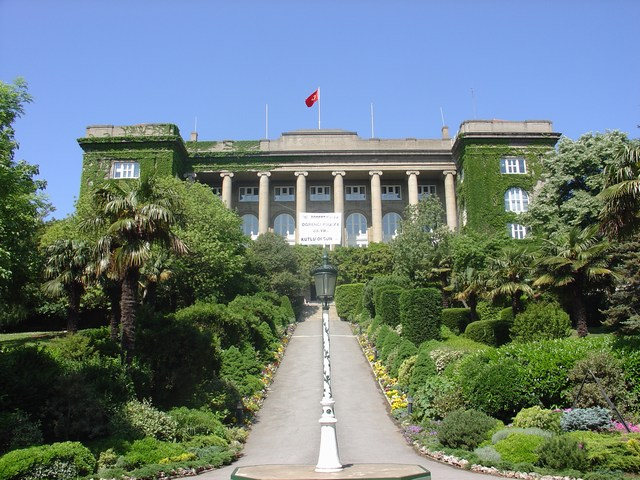
Robert College in Istanbul

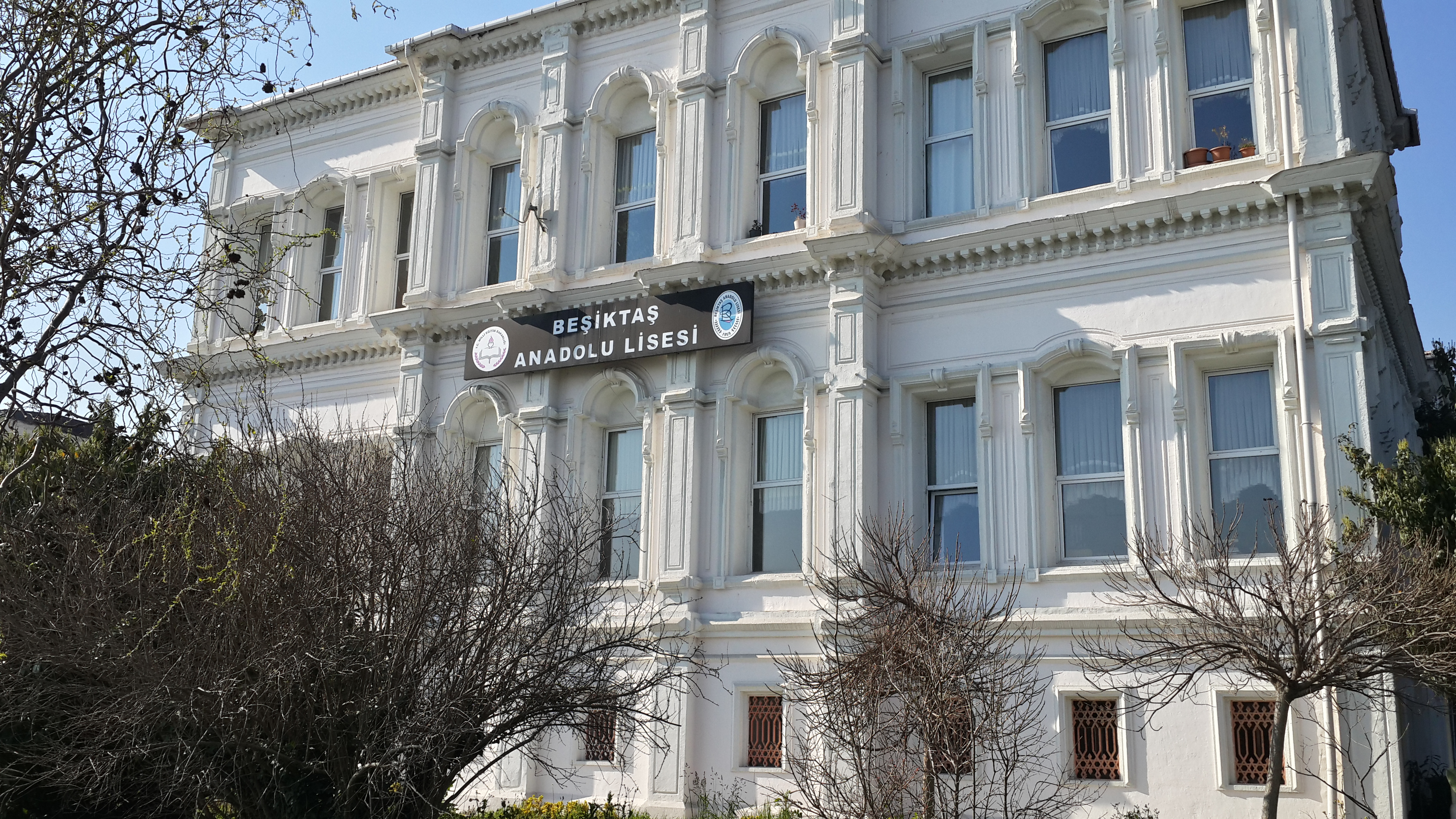
Beşiktaş Anatolian High School in Istanbul

Secondary education includes all of the general, vocational and technical education institutions that provide at least three years of education after primary school. The system for being accepted to a high school changes almost every year. Sometimes private schools have different exams, sometimes there are 3 exams for 3 years, sometimes there's only one exam but it is calculated differently, sometimes they only look at your school grades. Secondary education aims to give students a good level of common knowledge, and to prepare them for higher education, for a vocation, for life and for business in line with their interests, skills and abilities. In the academic year 2001–2002 2.3 million students were being educated and 134,800 teachers were employed in 6,000 education institutions.

General secondary education covers the education of children between 15 and 17 for at least three years after primary education. General secondary education includes high schools, foreign language teaching high schools, Anatolian High Schools, high schools of science, Anatolia teacher training high schools, and Anatolia fine arts high schools.

Vocational and technical secondary education involves the institutions that both raise students as manpower in business and other professional areas, prepare them for higher education and meet the objectives of general secondary education. Vocational and technical secondary education includes technical education schools for boys, technical education schools for girls, trade and tourism schools, religious education schools, multi-program high schools, special education schools, private education schools and health education schools.

Secondary education is often referred as high school education, since the schools are called lyceum (tr: lise).

In public high schools and vocational high schools, students attend six classes each day, which last for approximately 40 minutes each. In Anatolian high schools and private high schools, the daily programme is typically longer, up to eight classes each day, also including a lunch period. All 9th graders are taught the same classes nationwide, with minor differences in certain cases. These classes are: Turkish language, Turkish literature, mathematics, physics, chemistry, biology, geometry, world history, geography, religion & ethics, physical education, a foreign language (in most cases English), a second foreign language (most commonly German but could be French, Italian, Japanese, Arabic, Russian, or Chinese).

When students enter the 11th grade, they typically choose one of four tracks: Turkish language–mathematics, science, social sciences, and foreign languages. In vocational high schools, no tracks are offered, while in science high schools only the science tracks are offered. Different schools may have different policies; some, but not many, schools offer electives instead of academic tracks, giving students a wider range of options. For the 10th, 11th, and 12th grade, the compulsory courses are: Turkish language, Turkish literature and republican history. In addition to that, students may be taught the following classes, depending on the track they choose and/or the high school they attend: mathematics, geometry, statistics, physics, biology, chemistry, geography, philosophy, psychology, sociology, economy, logic, arts and music, traffic and health, computer, physical education, first and second foreign language.

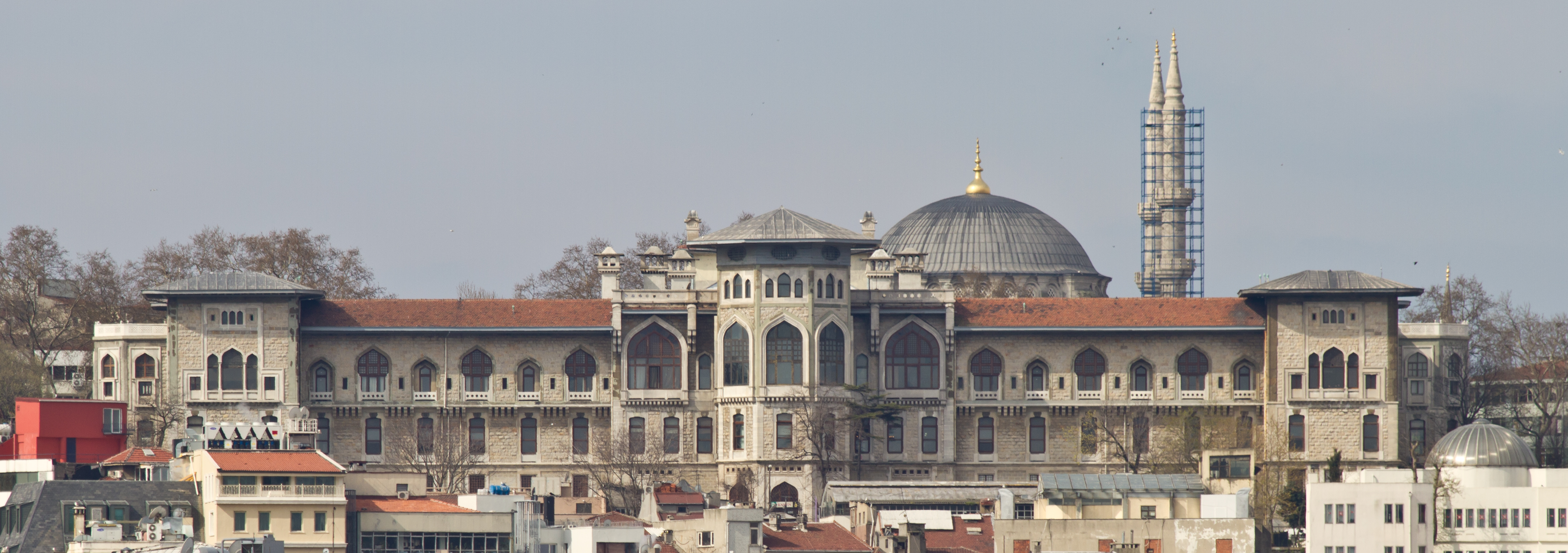
Istanbul High School (Istanbul Erkek Lisesi in Turkish) was founded in 1886.

The students used to be given a diploma for the academic track they had chosen, which gave them an advantage if they wanted to pursue their higher education in the corresponding fields, as the University Entrance Exam scores were weighted according to the student's track. (e.g. A science student would have an advantage over a Turkish-Mathematics student when applying for Medicine). As of the 2010–2011 educational year, all high school students are given the standard high school diploma.

At the end of high school, following the 12th grade, students take a high school finishing examination and they are required to pass this in order to take the University Entrance Exam and continue their studies at a university. There are four score types for different academic fields, including but not limited to:

- Turkish language–mathematics: international relations, law, education, psychology, economy, business management, and similar.
- Science: engineering, computer science, medicine, and other science-related professions.
- Social sciences: history, geography, and education.
- Foreign languages: language/linguistics and language teaching.

=== International education ===
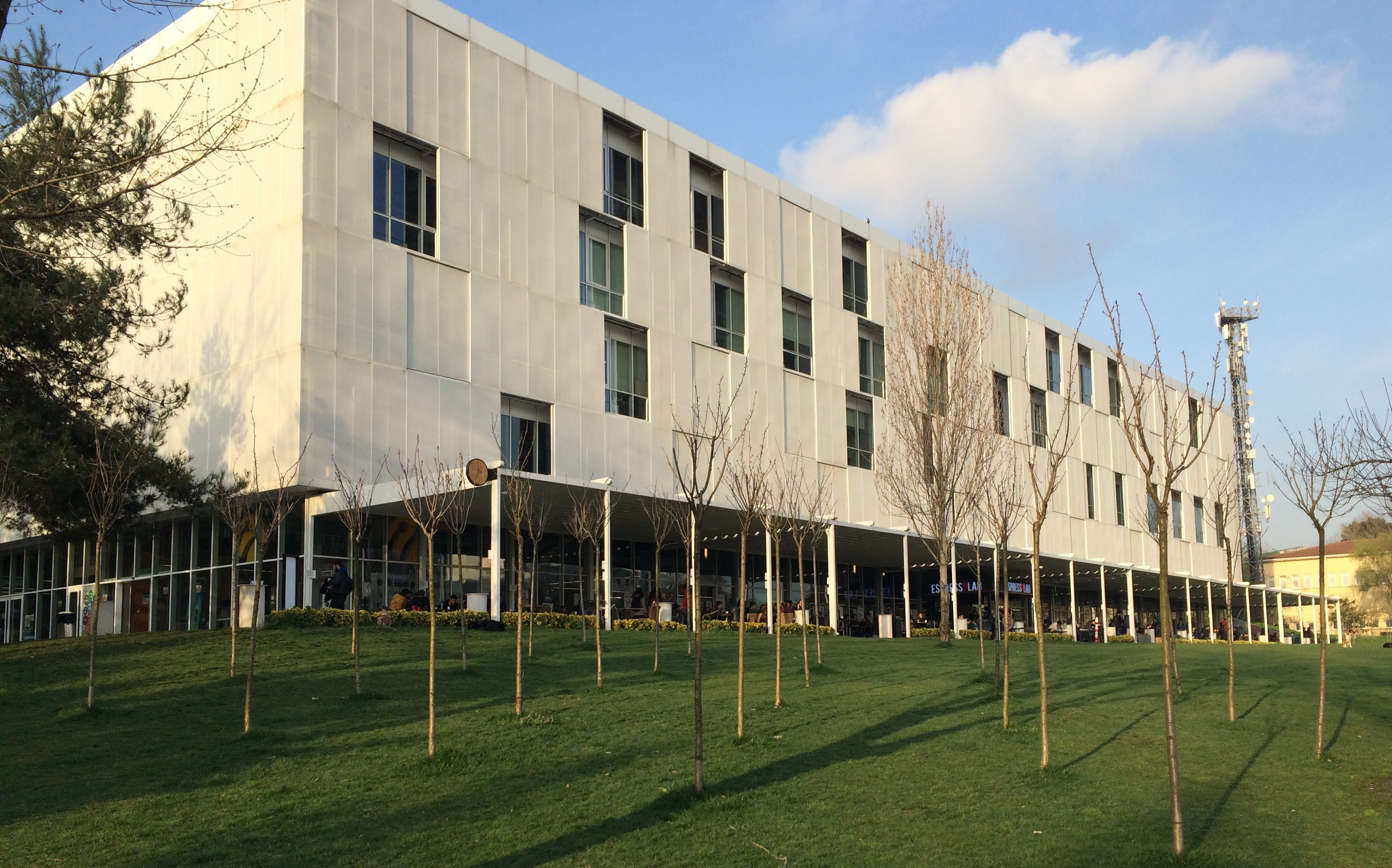
Lecture Hall at the Ayazağa campus of Istanbul Technical University.

The International Baccalaureate has been available in Turkey since 1994 when the first school was authorized by the IB and 53 schools now offer one or more of the IB programmes.

=== Vocational education ===
Vocational and technical secondary education involves the institutions that both raise students as manpower in business and other professional areas, prepare them for higher education and meet the objectives of general secondary education. Vocational and technical secondary education includes technical education schools for boys, technical education schools for girls, trade and tourism schools, religious education schools, multi-program high schools, special education schools, private education schools and health education schools. In the academic year 2001–2002, 821,900 students were being educated and 66,100 teachers were employed in 3,400 vocational and technical secondary education schools.

According to Article 37 of Vocational Education Law no 3308, the Ministry of National Education is organizing vocational courses to prepare the people who have left the formal education system and do not possess the qualifications required for employment for any vacant positions in the business sector. Based on apprenticeship training programs, the Ministry of National Education pays the insurance premiums against occupational accidents, sicknesses during the vocational period and other sicknesses of participants attending courses in relation to their occupation. These participants may take experienced apprenticeship exams after the education they have received and the work they have performed are evaluated according to the Regulations for Evaluating the Certificates and Diplomas in Apprenticeship and Vocational Training.

People who work in the 109 branches mentioned in Law no 3308, have finished primary education and are below the age of 14 may receive training as candidate apprentices or apprentices. Law no 4702 gives apprenticeship training opportunities to those over 19. The apprenticeship training lasts between 2–4 years depending on the nature of vocations.

Adolescents who have not attended the formal education system or left the system at any stage may take the experienced apprenticeship exam after 1 year of adaptation training, provided they had reached the age of 16 at the date when the said profession was included in the coverage of the law. Those at the age of 18 may directly take the experienced apprenticeship exam if a certificate is provided to prove that he/she is working in the related profession.

Those who graduate from vocational and technical secondary education institutions or vocational and technical schools and institutions may take proficiency exams in their professions. Graduates of technical high school or 4-year programs in vocational and technical schools and institutions are given a certificate to start businesses with the privileges and responsibilities of a proficiency certificate. In 2001, 248,400 apprentices were being educated and 5,100 teachers were employed in 345 vocational training centers.

=== The new system: 4+4+4 ===
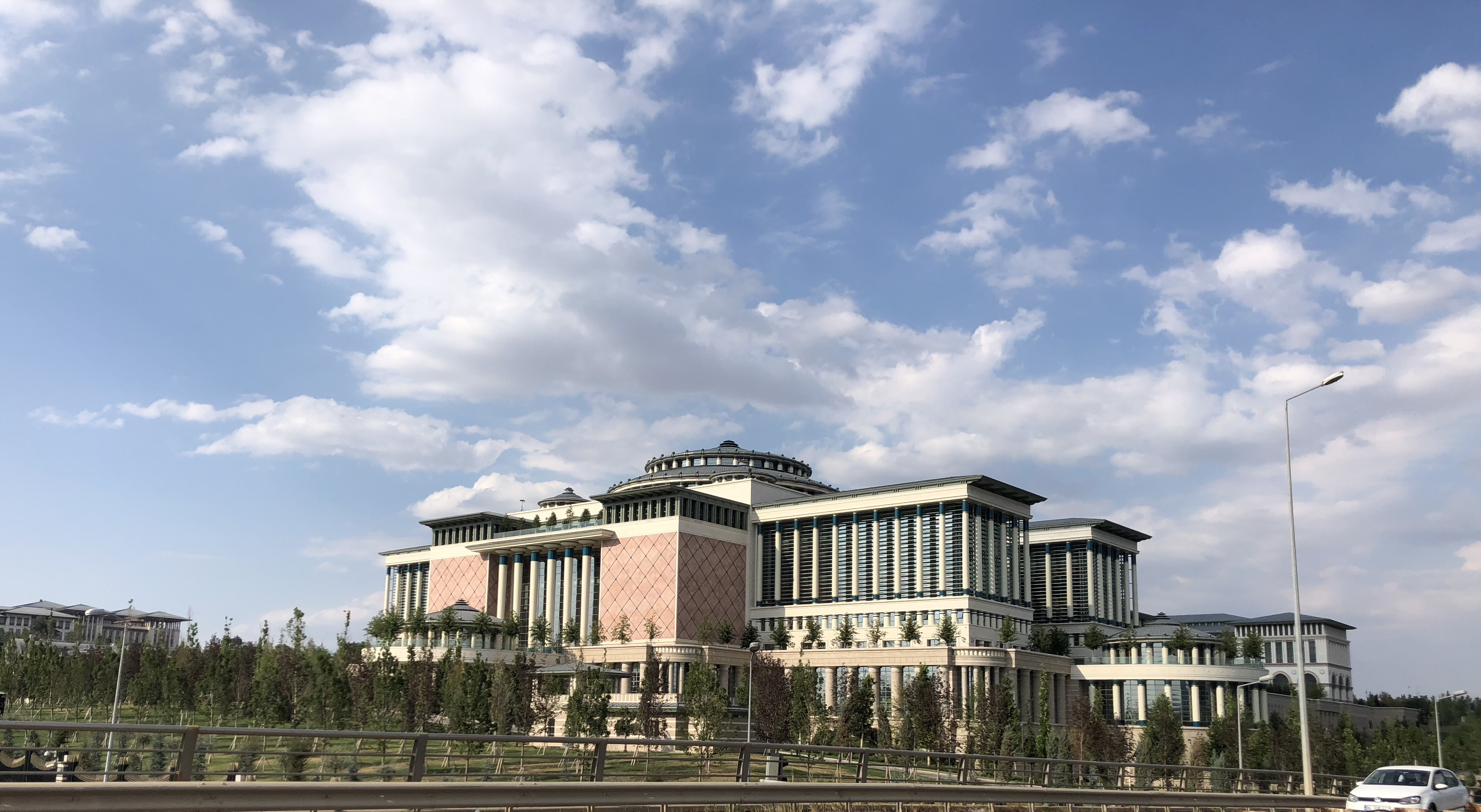
Presidential Library is the largest library in Ankara, with a collection of over four million books.

In March 2012 the Grand National Assembly passed new legislation on primary and secondary education usually termed as "4+4+4" (4 years primary education, first level, 4 years primary education, second level and 4 years secondary education). Children will begin their primary education in the first month of September following their sixth birthdays and will come to a close during the school year in which students turn 14 years old.

The primary education stages, which includes the first two stages of four years' education each, will entail four years of mandatory elementary education, followed by an additional mandatory four years of middle school education, in which students will be able to choose whether they want to study at a general education middle school or a religious vocational middle school, which are referred to as Imam Hatip schools. The new legislation includes the reopening of Imam Hatip middle schools. Primary education establishments will be set up separately as independent elementary schools and middle schools.

== Higher Education ==
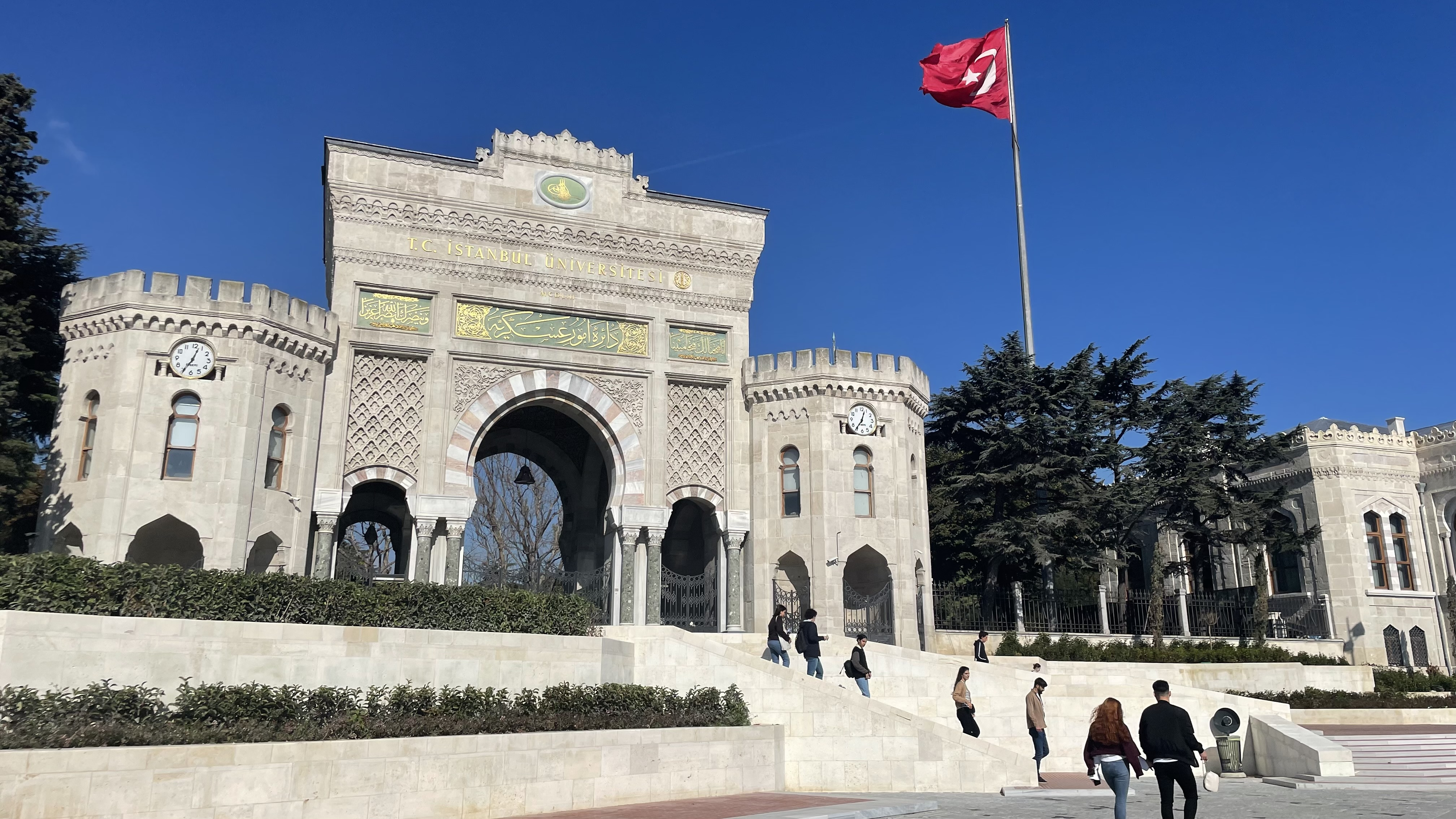
Main entrance gate of Istanbul University

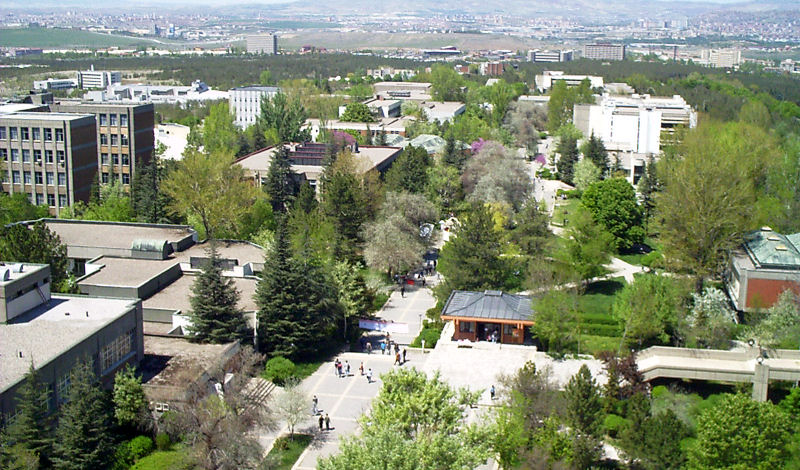
Middle East Technical University campus

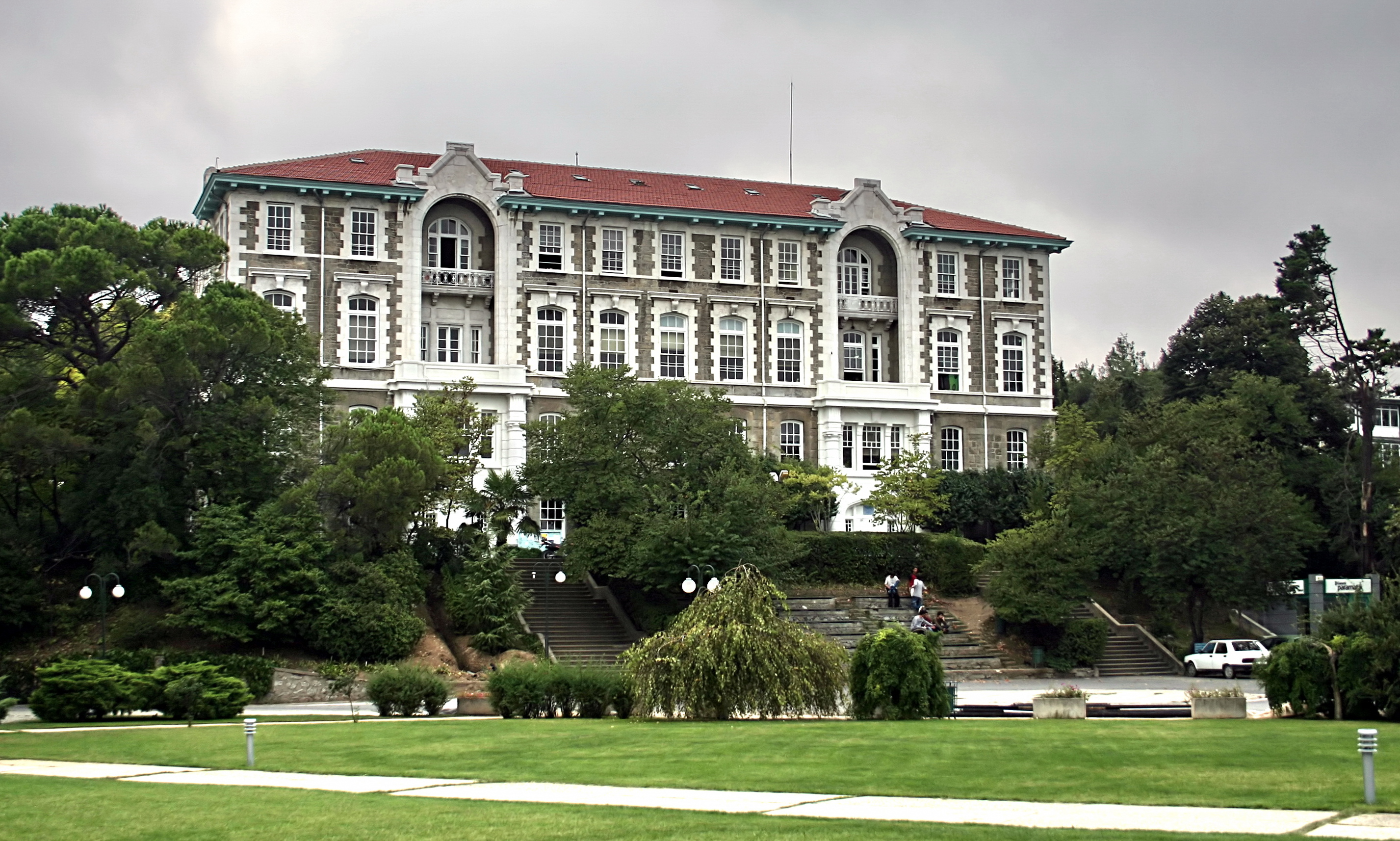
The former Robert College building on South Campus of Boğaziçi University, Istanbul

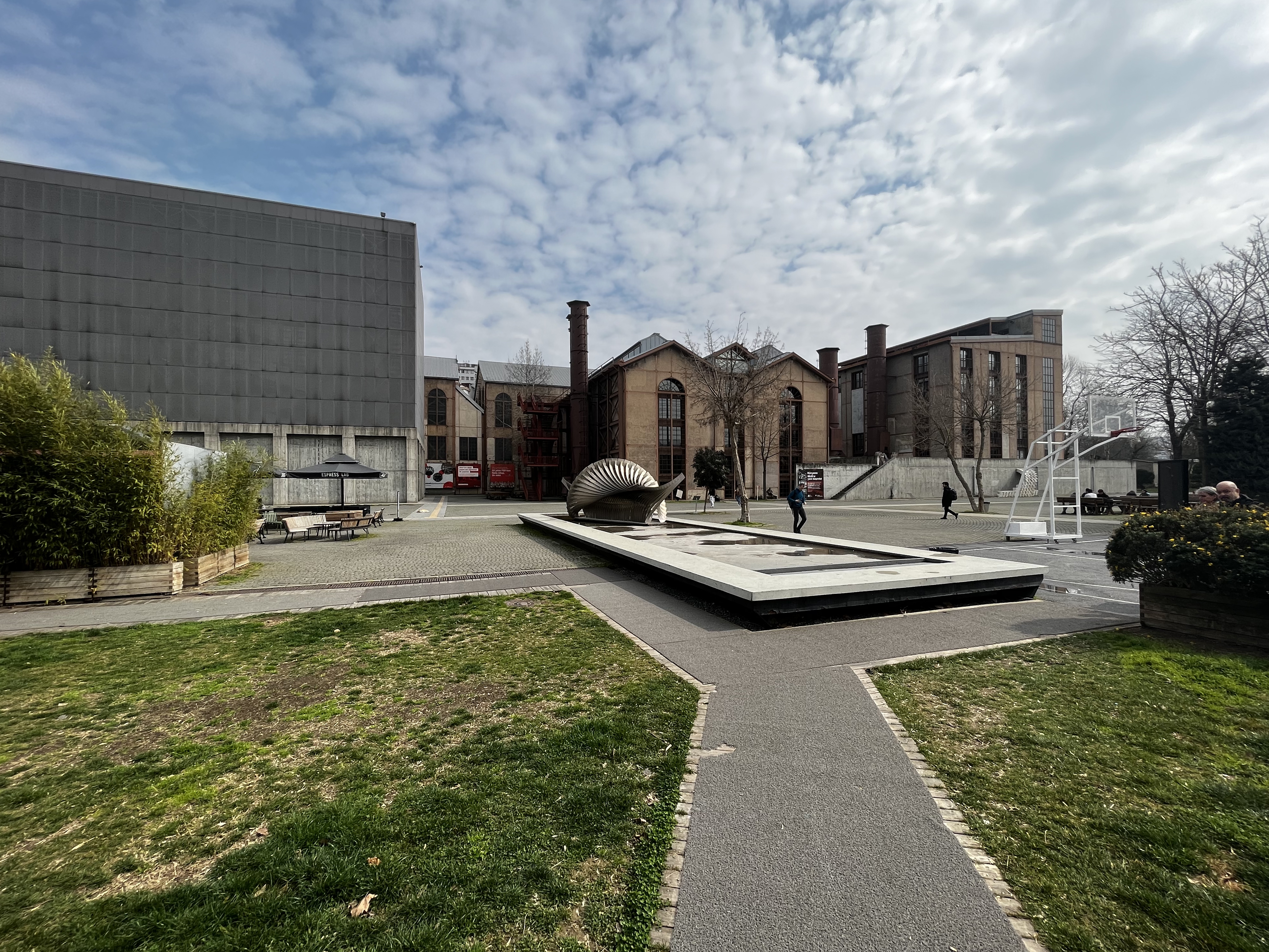
SantralIstanbul is an amphitheater, concert halls and a public library complex in Istanbul Bilgi University Campus, Istanbul.

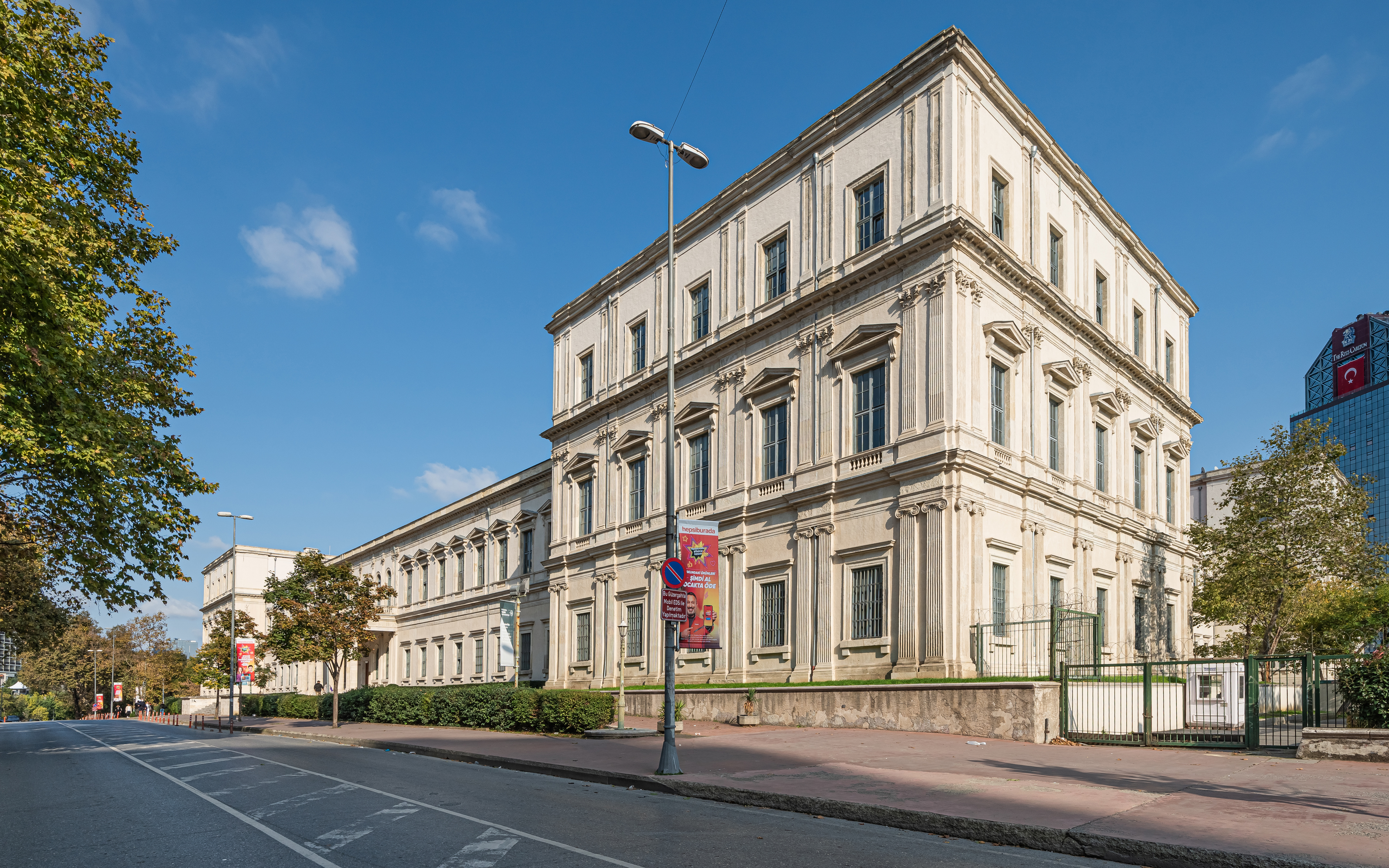
Istanbul Technical University building

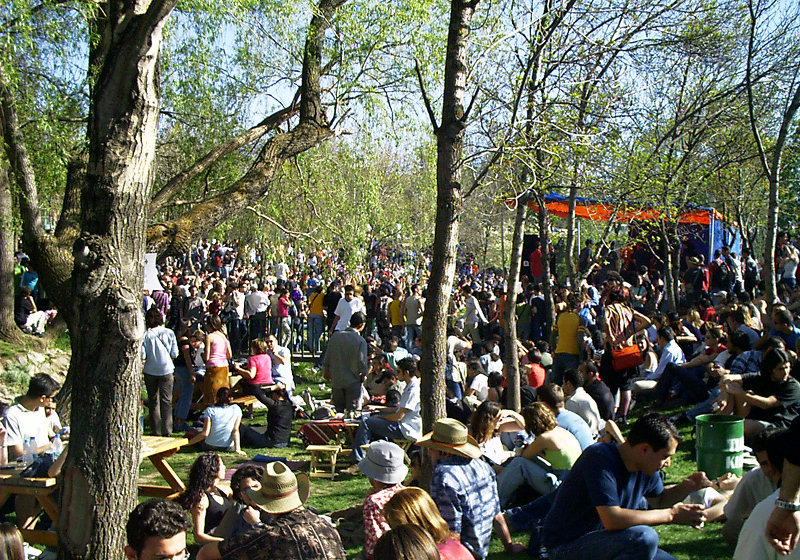
Students of Middle East Technical University, Ankara

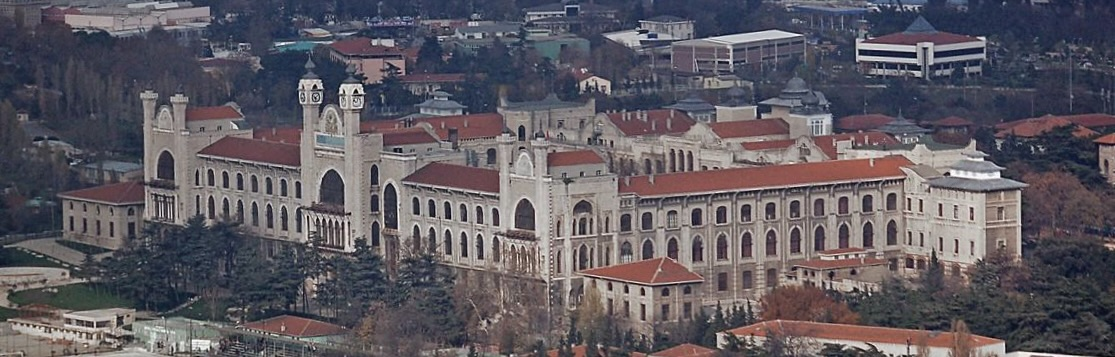
Haydarpaşa campus of Marmara University, originally the Imperial College of Medicine (Mekteb-i Tıbbiye-i Şahane), Istanbul.

Higher education includes all levels of institutions giving education past the secondary school level for a period of at least 17 years.

Higher education institutions include:

- Universities
- Faculties
- Institutes
- Higher education schools
- Vocational higher education schools
- Conservatories
- Application and research centers

In the 1930s, at the suggestion of Albert Einstein, the Atatürk government hired over a thousand established academics, including world-renowned émigré professors escaping the Nazi takeover in Germany. Most were in medicine, mathematics, and natural science, plus a few in the faculties of law and the arts. Germany's exiled professors served as directors in eight of twelve Istanbul's basic science Institutes, as well as six directors of Istanbul's seventeen clinics at the Faculty of Medicine.

In the academic year 2001–2002 there were 76 universities, 53 of which belonged to the state and 23 to foundations. In these institutions, 66,700 personnel were working, 63,000 in state universities and 3,700 in others.

After the national university entrance examination organized by the Measuring, Selection and Placement Center students, if they succeed, continue with their studies at a university. Foreign students take the YÖS Examination or provide equivalent credentials approved by the Council of Higher Education.

Universities provide two or four years of education for undergraduate studies, while graduate programs last at least two years. Some universities also require an additional year of foreign language (usually English) preparatory study before the start of studies unless an exemption examination is passed. Foreigners who couldn't be exempted are similarly subjected to a year of Turkish preparation study for the departments whose language of instruction is Turkish.

There are around 820 higher education institutions including universities with a total student enrollment of over 1 million. Tertiary education is the responsibility of the Higher Education Council, and funding is provided by the state for public institutions that make up the bulk of the tertiary education system. There are 167 universities in Turkey, which are classified as either public or foundational (private) and 373,353 students were graduated from these universities in 2006. Public universities typically charge very low fees while private foundation universities are highly expensive with fees that can reach $30,000 per annum. Since 1998, universities have been given greater autonomy and were encouraged to raise funds through partnerships with industry.

The quality of education at Turkish universities varies significantly, with some institutions offering education and facilities comparable to internationally renowned universities. Notably, many of the technical universities in Turkey are often compared to their counterparts in the United States. Some of these universities are regularly evaluated by the Accreditation Board for Engineering and Technology (ABET), and their engineering programs are frequently deemed substantially equivalent to similar programs in the United States.

The rectors of the universities are appointed by the President of Turkey.

Turkey is a member of the Socrates programme, Erasmus Programme and Erasmus+. Turkey is also a member of the Erasmus Student Network, a student organization with more than 15,000 volunteers across Europe. Turkey has become a hub for foreign students in recent years, with 795,962 foreign students in 2016. The government has announced a plan to draw around 500,000 foreign students at its universities by offering attractive scholarships. In 2021 Türkiye Scholarships, a government-funded program, received 165,000 applications from prospective students in 178 countries.

=== International students ===
In recent years, Turkey has become a popular destination for international students. The main reasons are the affordable tuition fees compared to destinations of similar reputation such as Eastern Europe and easier accessibility for international students. Applicants can take the YÖS exam, Turkish university entrance exam for foreign students, or apply with international university admissions such as SAT or high school diploma.

=== Research ===
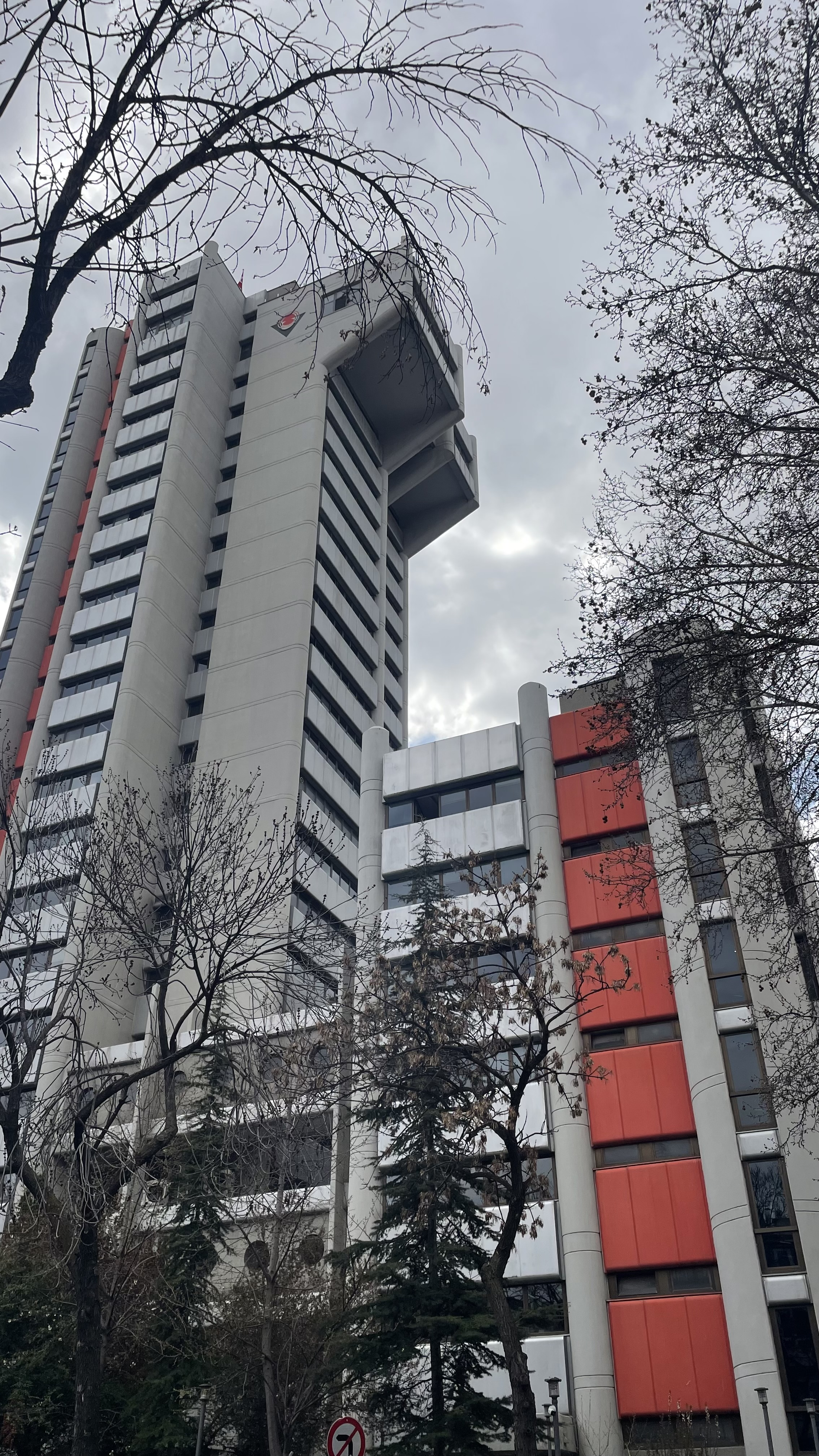
Headquarters of The Scientific and Technological Research Council of Turkey (TÜBİTAK) in Ankara.

The Scientific and Technological Research Council of Turkey (TÜBİTAK) coordinates basic and applied research and development, acting on proposed policies by the Turkish Academy of Sciences (TÜBA). There are more than 60 research institutes and organizations. Turkey's R&D strengths include agriculture, forestry, health, biotechnology, nuclear technologies, minerals, materials, IT, and defence.

== Private schools ==
In the Turkish education system, private schools may be grouped into four.

- Private Turkish schools: These schools, which are opened by real or corporate bodies of Turkish nationality, provide public education programs at pre-primary, primary and secondary education levels.
- Private schools for minorities: These were established in the Ottoman Empire period by Greek, Armenian and Jewish minorities and were placed under guarantee by the terms of the Lausanne Treaty. These schools are attended by students at pre-primary, primary and secondary education levels who belong to these minority classes and are of Turkish nationality.
- Private foreign schools: These are schools established during the Ottoman Empire by French, German, Italian, Austrian and American people who continue their activities under the terms of the Lausanne Treaty. Today these schools are attended by Turkish children.
- Private international education institutions: They have been opened and are active as per the provisions in the amended article 5 of the Law no. 625.

There are many dershane in cities. The law required them to be transformed into academic high schools in 2015.

== Religious education ==
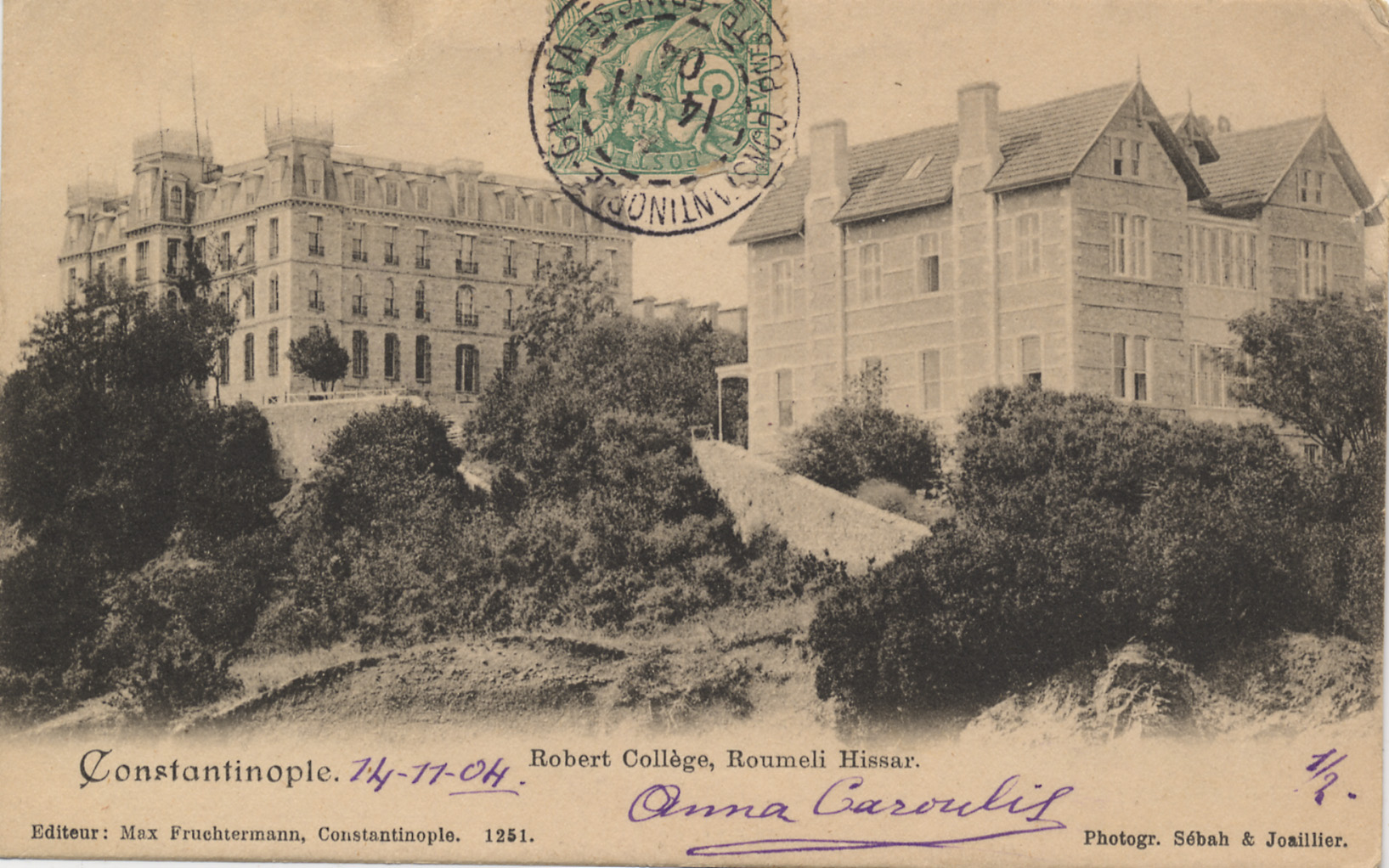
Robert College was founded in 1863 in Istanbul by Cyrus Haimlin and Christopher Robert. The school began its education program in the theology building of the American Missioners Commission. Today, the school is a secular leading-private school.

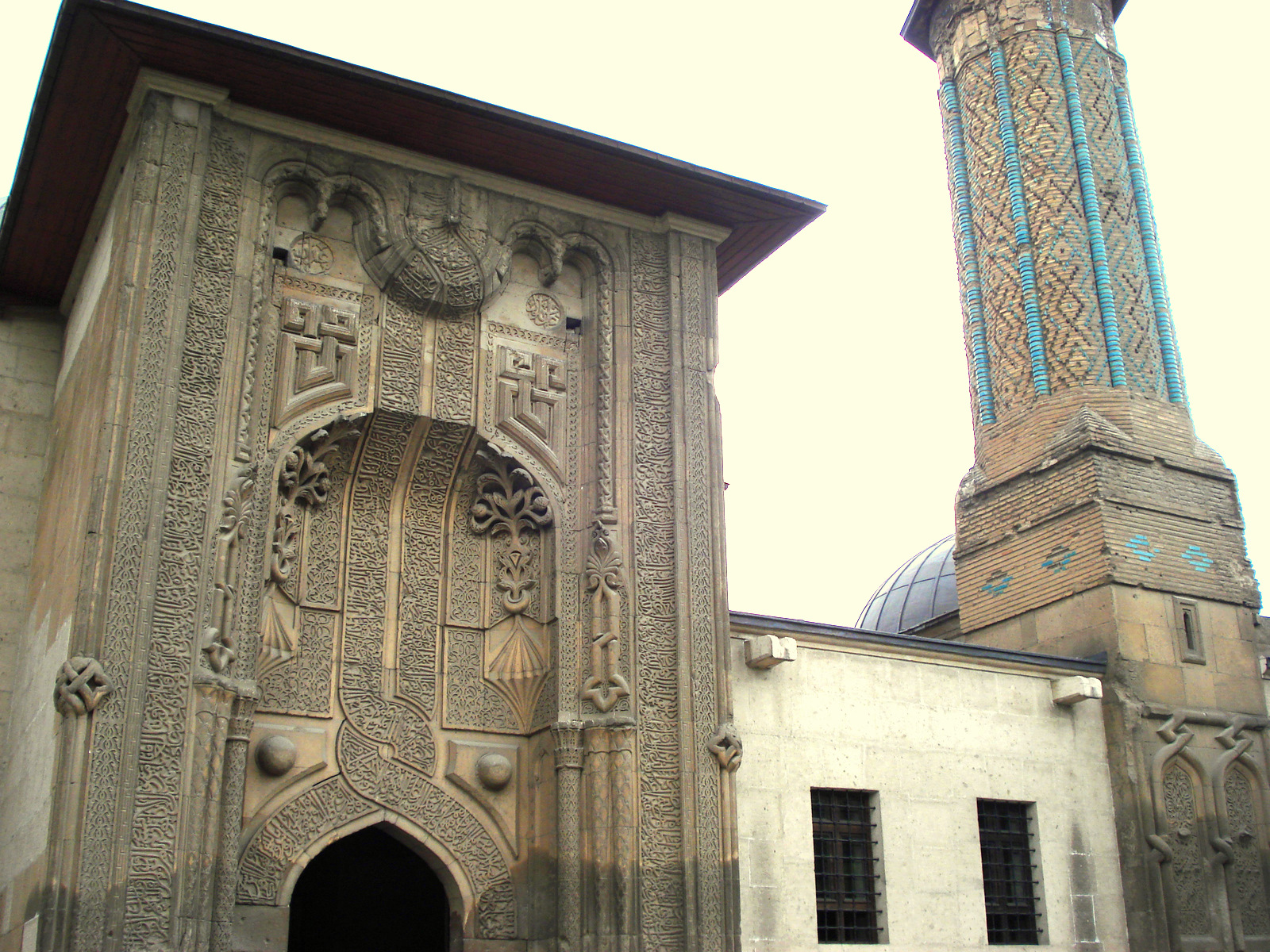
Ince Minaret Medrese is a 13th-century medrese (Islamic school) located in Konya, now housing the Museum of Stone and Wood Art.

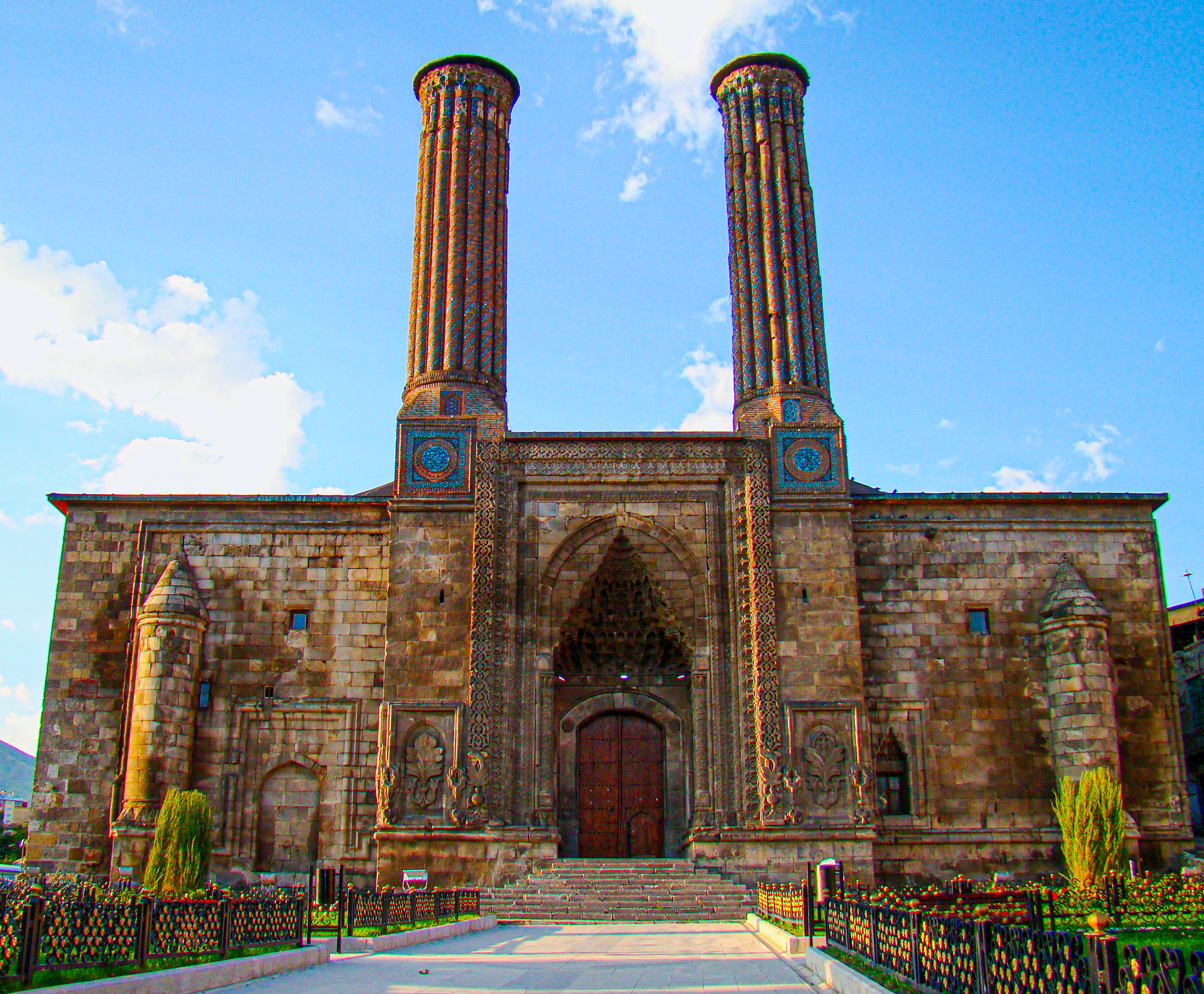
Çifte Minareli Medrese is an architectural monument of the late Seljuk period in Erzurum. Built as a theological school a few years before 1265.

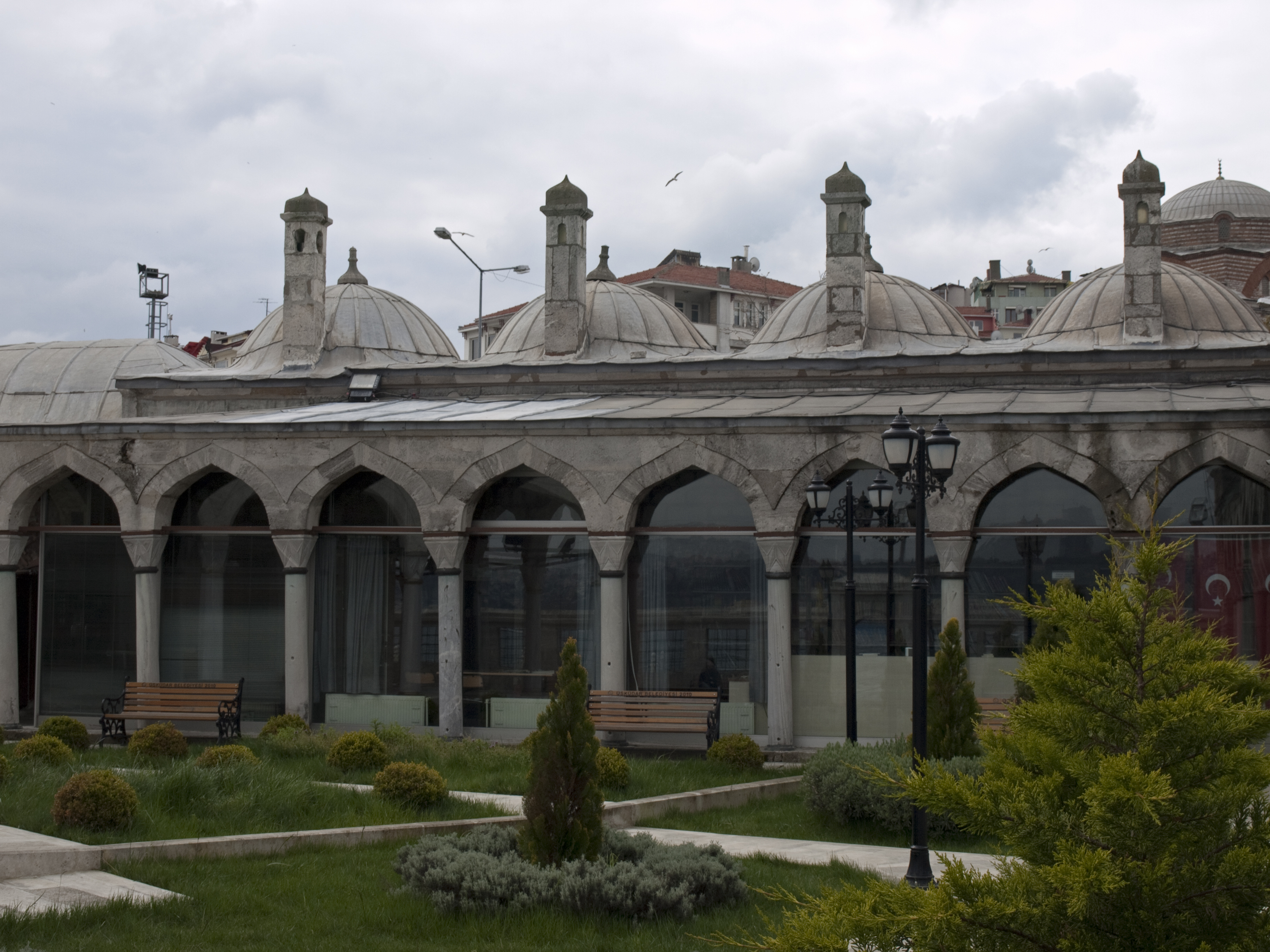
Şemsi Pasha Mosque and medrese (Islamic school) was built by Ottoman imperial architect Mimar Sinan in 1580, the most important architect of Ottoman Empire.

=== De-establishment ===
In 1927, all courses concerning religion were excluded from the curriculum of primary, secondary, and high schools on the basis that non-Muslims also live in Turkey. Between 1927 and 1949, religious instruction was not permitted in schools. In 1949, the Ministry of Education allowed a course on religion in 4th and 5th grades of primary school.

=== Re-establishment ===
In 1956, as a result of multi-party democracy, a new government was established. Being more sympathetic towards the religious sentiments of society, this new government introduced a religion course into secondary schools. This time, if the parents wanted to exempt their children from the course, they had to apply to the school with a written request. After nearly ten years, in 1967, the religion course was introduced to the 1st and 2nd grades of high school. Students, however, were enrolled for the course with the written request of their parents. In 1975, the course was extended to the third (last) grade of the high schools. And, finally, following the military coup in 1980, the religion course became schools was also constitutionally secured. The exact title of the course was, "The Culture of Religion and Knowledge of Ethics."

In 1985, the Institute for Creation Research, a United States creationist group, helped advise Turkey's education minister Vehbi Dinçerler on how to introduce creationism in high schools. Turkish academics have stated that the resulting ignorance of evolution led to Turkey coming last in a survey that measured knowledge of evolution in 34 industrialised nations.

Currently, religious education courses begin in the 4th grade (age 10) of primary school and continue throughout secondary and high school. From the 4th to the 8th grade, classes consist of two hours per week. At the high school level, there is one hour of class per week. Thus, a student who has graduated from high school receives 8 continuous years of religion courses. There are no fixed books for the course. Rather, each school decides which book to follow—provided that the book for each level is approved by the Ministry of Education. Nearly half of the content of these courses concerns religion and Islam (whom the majority are Muslims) with remaining topics ranging from secularism to humanism and from ethical values to etiquette. The major world religions such as Judaism, Christianity, Hinduism and Buddhism are included in the content of the course.

== Foreign languages ==
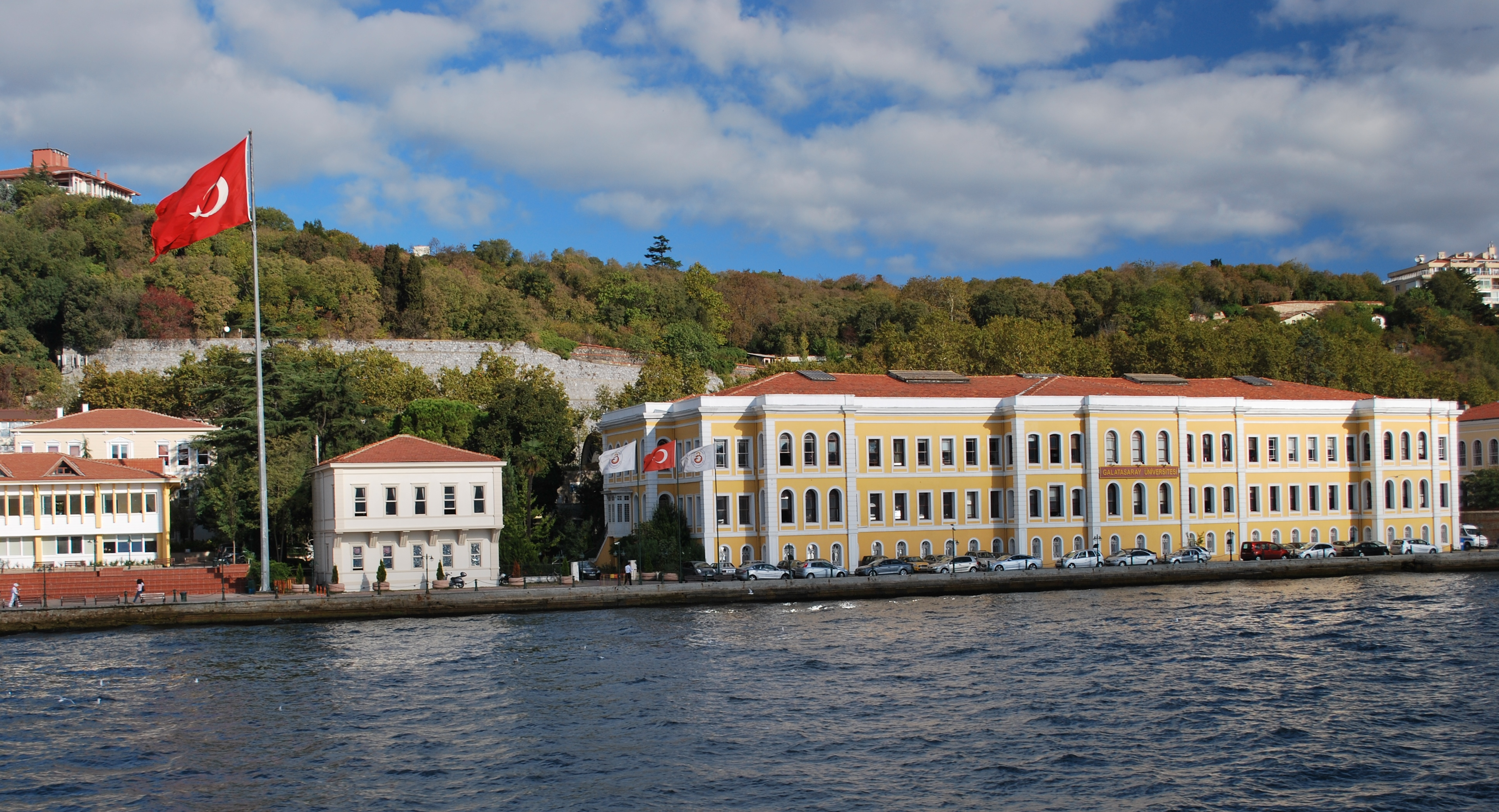
Galatasaray University and Galatasaray High School teaching in French.

The most common foreign language is English, which in public schools is taught from 2nd grade (age 8) onwards through to the end of high school. In high school, a second foreign language is introduced. However, the number of lessons given in public schools is minimal compared to private schools, which begin teaching English in kindergarten, have two or three times as many English lessons in the timetable, and in many cases employ native speakers of English as teachers.

In 2011 the Ministry of Education, under pressure from the Prime Minister to improve the learning of English in Turkey, announced that the approach to language would be thoroughly revised, part of which would include a plan to hire 40,000 foreigners as language assistants in public schools. As a result of the poor standards achieved by the public system many students take an intensive English language "prep year" when entering university. These are offered by both state and private universities throughout Turkey.

In 2012, the Ministry of Education included Kurdish (based on both Kurmanji and Zazaki dialects) to the academic programme of the basic schools as optional classes from the fifth year on.

Later, the Ministry of Education also included Abkhaz, Adyghe, Standard Georgian, and Laz languages in 2013, and Albanian as well as Bosnian languages in February 2017.

In 2015, the Ministry of Education announced that as of the 2016–17 academic year, Arabic courses (as a second language) will be offered to students in elementary school starting in second grade. The Arabic courses will be offered as an elective language course like German, French and English. According to a prepared curriculum, second and third graders will start learning Arabic by listening-comprehension and speaking, while introduction to writing will join these skills in fourth grade and after fifth grade students will start learning the language in all its four basic skills.

== Indoctrination ==
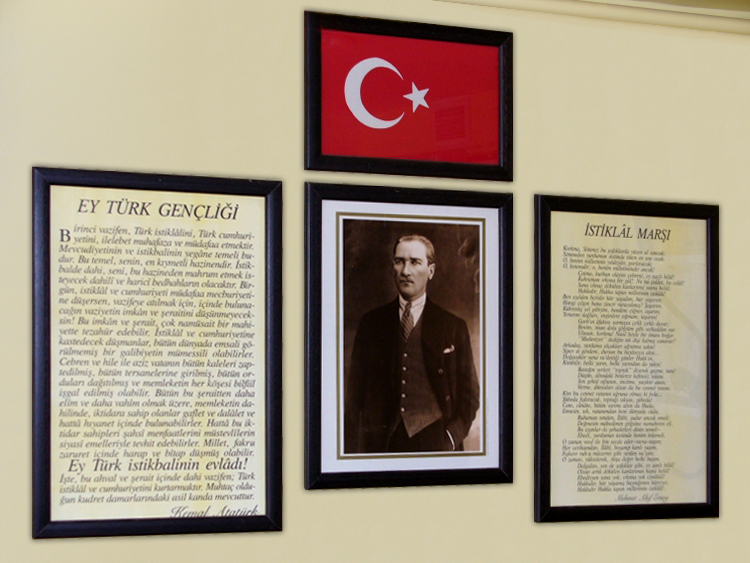
A Turkish flag, a portrait of Mustafa Kemal Atatürk, the lyrics of the Turkish national anthem, and Atatürk's speech of advice to Turkish youth hanging on a classroom wall.

Turkish education system requires students to be educated on the basis of Turkish nationalism in Atatürk's thought (Atatürk milliyetçiliği) and aims to create individuals who are committed to laique, democratic values of Turkey.During Atatürk's presidency, schools to Turkefy the Kurds such as the Elazig Girls' Institute were set up. In the late 1990s, the National Security Council, which at the time was dominated by a secular military, demanded the administration of the Prime Minister Necmettin Erbakan to carry out regulations aiming to curb rising Islamic fundamentalism.

Every weekday early in the morning student oath was to be sung by students until it was abolished in 2013. In every classroom, a portrait of Atatürk, lyrics of the National Anthem and text of Atatürk's Address To Turkish Youth are hung high up at the wall. In history lessons, nationalistic values are promoted and denialism of Armenian genocide is taught.

== Criticism ==
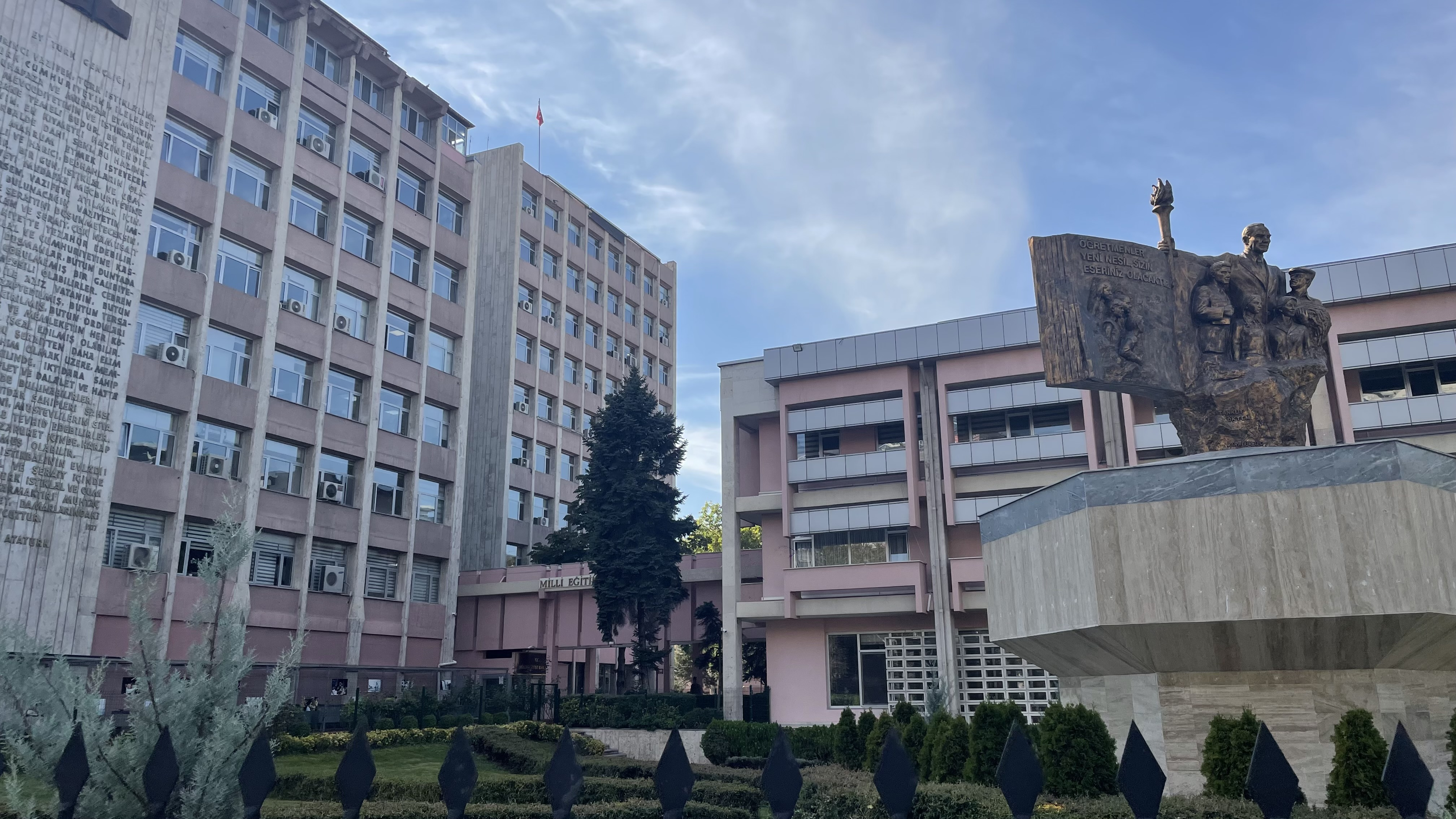
Ministry of Education in Ankara

=== Education ===
Constant alterations of education system in Turkey has caused controversy. In 2005 preparatory classes for foreign languages were abolished with only a few high school being exempt from. The examination system for entrance to high schools and universities has been constantly changed since the early 2000s. 17 thousand students getting full scores in first session of TEOG ("transition [exam] from basic education to secondary education") has also caused controversy. Counselor of Ministry of National Education Yusuf Tekin answered this concern by stating students who get full scores in both sessions must be treated as people actually taking the first place which 665 such students exist. Reduction of topics about Atatürk, downgrading in positive sciences teaching and promotion of religious content has drawn reactions.

=== Textbooks ===
Although the government distributes free textbooks, there is a high demand for private textbooks due to the low quality of state-approved textbooks. The purchase of private textbooks is not obligatory, nevertheless, families feel compelled to buy them so that their children receive a better education. As of 2019, the total cost of private textbooks for a student can be about ₺500. The usage of private textbooks in schools is officially prohibited.

=== Bias in curricula ===
Turkish schools, regardless of whether they are public or private, are required to teach history based on the textbooks approved by the Ministry of Education. The state uses its monopoly to increase support for the official position of Armenian genocide denial, demonizing Armenians and presenting them as enemies. For decades, these textbooks omitted any mention of Armenians as part of Ottoman history. Since the 1980s, textbooks discuss the "events of 1915", but deflect the blame from the Ottoman government to other actors, especially imperialist powers who allegedly manipulated the Armenians to achieve their nefarious goals of undermining the empire, and the Armenians themselves, for allegedly committing treason and presenting a threat to the empire. Some textbooks admit that deportations occur and Armenians died, but present this action as necessary and justified. Most recently, textbooks have accused Armenians of perpetrating genocide against Turkish Muslims. In 2003, students in each grade level were instructed to write essays refuting the genocide.

Teachers are instructed to tell seventh-year students:

State to your students that the Russians also made some Armenians revolt on this front and murder many of our civilian citizens. Explain that the Ottoman State took certain measures following these developments, and in May 1915 implemented the 'Tehcir Kanunu' [Displacement Law] regarding the migration and settlement of Armenians in the battleground. Explain that care was taken to ensure that the land in which the Armenians who had to migrate were to settle was fertile, that police stations were established for their security and that measures were taken to ensure they could practice their previous jobs and professions.

== Media of education ==
In addition to education in Turkish, the Treaty of Lausanne has guarantees of allowing education in other languages. Hebrew was the instructional language of Judaism, and so the Treaty of Lausanne protected instruction in Hebrew, but not in Judaeo-Spanish, a language passed along in families but never used in school instruction. As the Treaty of Lausanne went into effect and was intended to protect languages of instruction for ethnic minorities, French was not included, and so schools for Jewish children teaching in French converted into being Turkish medium schools. The quantity and quality of French instruction declined in those schools for Jewish children, and so many Jewish students began attending other language-medium private schools.

== Education for religious minorities ==
The Treaty of Lausanne had guarantees for education of religious minorities. After the establishment of the Republic of Turkey, the government made it illegal for schools to have classes which teach religion. By 1928 many schools for Jewish children had monetary collapses, and/or had ended operations. Eventually, remaining Jewish schools had curricula that resembled that of mainstream Turkish schools.

== See also ==
- Nation's schools
- Nesin Mathematics Village
