= Student Selection and Placement System =

Turkish higher education admission exam

Student Selection and Placement System (Turkish: Öğrenci Seçme ve Yerleştirme Sistemi, ÖSYS) or Higher Education Institutions Examination (Turkish: Yükseköğretim Kurumları Sınavı, YKS), formerly Higher Education Entrance Examination-Undergraduate Placement Examination, (Turkish: Yükseköğretime Geçis Sınavı-Lisans Yerleştirme Sınavı, YGS-LYS), is a standardized test for the admission to higher education in Turkey administered by ÖSYM. Within the Turkish education system, the only way to enter a university is through this exam. 1,692,000 high school graduates took the exam in 2011 and 2,255,386 in 2016. It is a multiple choice exam, with 5 options for each question. It has two parts, together called the Basic Proficiency Test-Field Proficiency Test (Turkish: Temel Yeterlilik Testi-Alan Yeterlilik Testi, TYT-AYT).

== History ==
=== 1974–1980: ÜSS ===
Interuniversity Selection Examination (Turkish: Üniversitelerarası Seçme Sınavı, ÜSS) was first applied in 1974. Before then, each university selected their students via their own criteria. With the increasing number of youth and the overloaded applications, the universities gathered and founded the Higher Education Council (Turkish: Yüksekögretim Kurulu, YÖK), and a subdivision named Interuniversity Student Selection and Placement Center (Turkish: Üniversitelerarası Öğrenci Seçme ve Yerleştirme Merkezi, ÜSYM).

=== 1981–1998: ÖSS and ÖYS ===
In 1981, the number of the exams were increased to two, namely the ÖSS and Student Placement Examination (Turkish: Öğrenci Yerleştirme Sınavı, ÖYS). If a student did not achieve the specified grade in ÖSS, they did not have the right to enter ÖYS, and thus, lost their chance to be accepted to a university. ÖSS consisted of questions about the ninth grade curriculum, and ÖYS was a test on the tenth and eleventh grade curriculum. ÖSS eliminated the students on the basis of the grade they had received in the exam, and ÖYS placed the students to the universities they wanted. This system continued until 1999 when ÖYS was dropped and the system reverted to the single ÖSS exam, with the same format and same questions.

=== 1999–2005: ÖSS and YDS ===
The ÖSS exam was a 180-minute exam with 180 questions testing students' analytical thinking and problem-solving abilities, as well as knowledge of the high school curriculum.

A foreign language exam (Turkish: Yabancı Dil Sınavı, YDS), was conducted a week after the ÖSS. It was composed of foreign language questions in English, French, and German.

The maximum score that a student could attain on the ÖSS was 380. The highest score on the exam was 300, and the final 80 was based on a student's high school score based on their GPA, graduation rank, and school's past success on the ÖSS exam.

If a student selected a university department related to their studies at high school (namely applied sciences, social sciences, or foreign languages), their score was multiplied by 0.8. If a student preferred to study at a different department from their high school concentration, their score was multiplied by 0.3.

=== 2006–2009: Major changes ===
Students who took ÖSS in 2006 saw some major changes. The exam now lasted 195 minutes, and had two parts: ÖSS 1 and ÖSS 2. ÖSS 1 had 120 questions on the ninth and tenth grade curriculum.

ÖSS 2 is composed of 120 questions out of which students have to answer 60. Students at foreign languages departments answered ÖSS 1 and foreign language questions; tested separately in YDS.

=== 2010–2017: YGS–LYS ===
From 2010 to 2018, students took the Higher Education Entrance Examination (YGS) in March. Those who pass the YGS are then entitled to take the Undergraduate Placement Examination (LYS), in June. Students who only take the YGS, in which students have to answer 160 questions in 160 minutes, are able to apply for associate degree programs. There were five LYS sessions, whereas the previous university entrance system, the ÖSS, was held once in a year throughout the country.

=== 2018–present: TYT–AYT ===
The Higher Education Institutions Examination (YKS) is a 3-session exam. All applicants applying to YKS are required to attend the Basic Proficiency Test (TYT). Other sessions are optional.

The first session is the Basic Proficiency Test (TYT), with 120 questions. The second session is the Field Qualification Tests (AYT), and the third session is the Foreign Language Test (YDT).

Results are announced in the second half of June and students have to make their university preferences by the last week of July. They are placed in courses according to their scores and this is announced at the end of August.

== Current system ==
=== Examination system ===
==== First Session: Basic Proficiency Test (TYT) ====
Applicants must apply for a two-round examination to attend higher education. Firstly, students take the Basic Proficiency Test (Temel Yeterlilik Testi, TYT). TYT is obligatory for university admission and represents the first session. The purpose of the test is to evaluate logical thinking, reasoning, evaluation, and thinking-based problem-solving skills of students. Questions are selected from the high school curriculum and participation in this session is mandatory. Initially, the minimum passing scores of 150 and 180 for the TYT and AYT exams, which were required for choosing associate and bachelor's degree programs, were abolished in 2022. It is sufficient for applicants to score 0.5 net points in both Turkish and Mathematics to enable preference selection. Additionally, students who scored 200 points and above in TYT could retain their score for two years, provided they did not partake in the selection. The exam was 135 minutes. In accordance with the guide published in 2022, the duration was extended to 165 minutes. Applicants’ right to use their TYT scores in subsequent years was also revoked.

Question distribution in TYT
Subjects	Scope of the tests	Number of questions
Turkish Test	Testing the correct usage of Turkish, basic grammar, sentence construction, paragraphs, spelling rules, spelling errors, explication, reading comprehension, vocabulary, etc.	40
Social Sciences Test	Testing of general condition, knowledge of principle and concepts, explication, etc. in the following lessons: History, Geography, Religious Culture and Moral Knowledge, Philosophy	History: 5; Geography: 5; Philosophy: 5; Religious Culture and Moral Knowledge: 5 (Note: Students exempt from the Religious Culture and Moral Knowledge (DKAB) courses can choose additional 5 Philosophy questions instead.)
Basic Mathematics Test	Testing of Basic Mathematics rules, feasibility of basic operations, ability to perform abstract operations based on basic mathematics, everyday use	40
Science Test	Testing and usage of basic concepts and principles in the following lessons: Physics, Chemistry, Biology	Physics: 7; Chemistry: 7; Biology: 6
		Total no. of questions: 120

==== Second Session: Field Proficiency Test (AYT) ====
The purpose of the Field Proficiency Test (Alan Yeterlilik Testleri, AYT) is to assess applicants' proficiency in their chosen field. Applicants are responsible for taking different tests based on their selected field: e.i. Mathematics and Science for SAY (Quantitative), Turkish and Social Science for SÖZ (Verbal), and Mathematics, Turkish, and Social Sciences for EA (Equal Weight). The questions are based on the four-year high school curriculum. Applicants are not required to take AYT following TYT. However, since most 4-year education universities require a TYT (40%) + AYT (60%) score, taking this exam is generally required. The exam's duration is 180 minutes.

Question distribution in AYT
Exam	Tests	Number of questions
Field Proficiency Tests (AYT)	Turkish Language and Literature, Social Sciences-1 Test	Turkish Language and Literature: 24; History-1: 10; Geography-1: 6
Field Proficiency Tests (AYT)	Social Sciences-2 Test	History-2: 11; Geography-2: 11; Philosophy Group: (Note: Psychology, Sociology, Logic.) 12; Religious Culture and Moral Knowledge: (Note: Or additional Philosophy Group questions.) 6
Field Proficiency Tests (AYT)	Mathematics Test	40
Field Proficiency Tests (AYT)	Science Test	Physics: 14; Chemistry: 13; Biology: 13
		Total no. of questions: 160

==== Foreign Language Test (YDT) ====
Following TYT, the Foreign Language Test (Yabancı Dil Testi, YDT) is directed at applicants who want to apply for fields that accept students via the DİL (Language) score. It is made up of 80 questions. According to preference, German, Arabic, French, English, and Russian can be selected for the exam. The exam's duration is 120 minutes.

=== Percentage weights of tests according to score types ===
Applicants can access information about which score types their target field(s) accept students based on from the YÖK Program Atlas. While the weight of each score type is different, the TYT score affects 40% of all AYT score types. The test percentages based on score types are listed below.

Test weights in TYT scores (%)
Turkish	Social Sciences	Basic Mathematics	Sciences
33	17	33	17

Test weights in YKS Quantitative (YKS-SAY) scores (%)
Score type	TYT	+	AYT tests			
Score type	TYT	+	Mathematics	Sciences		
Score type	TYT	+	Mathematics	Physics	Chemistry	Biology
YKS SAY	40	+	30	10	10	10

Test weights in YKS Equal Weight (YKS-EA) scores (%)
Score type	TYT	+	AYT tests			
Score type	TYT	+	Mathematics	Turkish Language and Literature – Social Sciences-1 Test		
Score type	TYT	+	Mathematics	Turkish Language and Literature	History-1	Geography-1
YKS EA	40	+	30	18	7	5

Test weights in YKS Verbal (YKS-SÖZ) scores (%)
Score type	TYT	+	AYT tests						
Score type	TYT	+	Turkish Language and Literature – Social Sciences-1 Test			Social Sciences-2 Test			
Score type	TYT	+	Turkish Language and Literature	History-1	Geography-1	History-2	Geography-2	Philosophy Group	DKAB / additional Philosophy Group
YKS SÖZ	40	+	18	7	5	8	8	9	5

Test weights in YKS Language (YKS-DİL) scores (%)
Score type	TYT	+	AYT tests
Score type	TYT	+	Selected Foreign Language Test
YKS DİL	40	+	60

=== Application process ===
==== ÖSYM AİS ====
ÖSYM AİS is the system that contains the information about applicants registered in the system. Applicants can apply for all exams arranged by the ÖSYM, view their results, and use preference selection. Additionally, archives of other ÖSYM exams taken by the applicants are also present in this system. The AİS passwords are assigned by ÖSYM centres and deputy directors of secondary education institutions. If an applicant wishes to change their profile picture in the system, they can consult an ÖSYM centre to perform this process. Moreover, the applicant picture that is present at AİS is printed on student cards given to those at universities.

==== Exam applications ====
According to the 2018 YKS applicant guide, in a secondary education institution (high schools or equivalent schools, open education high schools) students of last grade, those who have already graduated, those whose graduation is pending (those prevented from graduating due to failed courses), and graduates from a foreign secondary education institution equivalent can apply for the exam. Application to the YKS is mandatory for central admission (those who have the right to apply via TÜBİTAK competitions without exams included) and to be admitted to institutions that accept students based on special aptitude tests.

Applicants can make an application at the school they attend. Students from open education high schools can apply at select schools and institutions. Moreover, applications can be made at ÖSYM centres as well. If students from the last grade of a secondary education institution wish to apply at their own school, they can only do so during periods determined by the deputy directors. In this type of application, a student is given a form to fill, the student's picture is taken, and a fee set by the ÖSYM is charged to the student to assign them a password. If the applicant wishes, they can change the password and their exam location preference (e.g., Istanbul Districts 1, 2, 3, and 4) on ÖSYM AİS. The ÖSYM states warnings and recommendations about changing passwords via this system and not sharing it with third parties.

Applicants who have taken the exam before can make their application for it again individually using ÖSYM AİS. The initial requirement for this is to have a valid profile picture on the system. It is required for the system to contain a picture taken at an ÖSYM centre in the last 50 months. Meanwhile, the education information is to be automatically reflected on the system. Those who do not have a valid profile picture or wish to change the existing one, can finish this process at the ÖSYM application centres. Applicants lacking education information can consult related ÖSYM institutions.

=== Application fees ===
Applicants are required to pay the exam fee at the ÖSYM’s dedicated institutions after completing the application process at ÖSYM AİS or other application centres. Applicants who have not paid the fee despite completing the application process cannot take the exam. Exam fees vary from year to year. The institutions dedicated to the payment of the exam fees by the ÖSYM are written on the published applicant guide each year. Students can access this guide on the ÖSYM’s official website. In 2026, each session requires ₺700.

=== Admission ===
Various fields and programs have ranking requirements. According to this, in Equal Weight score types the minimum ranking limitation for law programs is 100,000; engineering programs that admit students based on their SAY score, the ranking requirement is 300,000, for architecture programs 250,000, for medical programs 50,000, for pharmacy programs 100,000, and for dentistry programs 80,000. In all teaching fields, including Psychological Counseling and Guidance (PDR), the minimum ranking limitation for relevant score types (e.i., SÖZ for Turkish teachers) is set at 300,000.

==== OBP calculation ====
The Secondary School Achievement Score (OBP) is a score calculated based on high school diploma grades. Following the calculation, the OBP is converted to a minimum 250 or maximum 500 points. The conversion process is obtained by multiplying each applicant's GPA by five. If the GPA is below 50 on a 100-point scale, it will be considered as 50, and the minimum OBP of 250 will be calculated for the applicant. For applicants whose grade was calculated via a 5 or 10-point scale, their GPA will be first converted to the 100-point scale and then the OBP will be calculated using the same method.

OBP is a value used in calculating admission scores. For applicants whose exam scores are calculated, 0.12 of their OBP is added to those scores. For example, if an applicant scored 350 and their total GPA is 80, their admission score increases to 398 through OBP contribution. The calculation process: Admission score = Exam Score + (GPA × 5) × 0.12.

For admission to various programs, the applicant's GPA is multiplied by 0.18 instead of 0.12. For this to happen, an applicant must have graduated from a vocational high school and chosen a two-year program related to their profession. The 0.18 contribution for a four-year program was only received by those who attended a vocational or Anatolian teacher high school and chose a qualified undergraduate program to continue their profession in the year of March 2012. Since then, the 0.18 contribution is not received for the four-year programs.

==== YÖK Program Atlas ====
An app created by the YÖK in 2016. Students can use the YÖK Atlas application to access statistical data on students admitted to all relevant undergraduate and associate degree programs at universities affiliated with the YÖK. Applicants who wish to be admitted to a specific field can find the answer for the net they must score, the points they must score, and how their rankings should be for admission to that field through average values via the Atlas app. Therewith, the demographic structure of the preferred field, the region and province of the admitted students (anonymously, as a graphic), the types of schools they graduated, the academic quantitative data of the field, and applicants' similar preferences are also shared. In the Atlas app, statistical data of the exams 2–3 years prior to the current exam are also reflected. Moreover, a system that assists applicants with creating a list of preferences and allows viewing the success of graduates from the same field they want admission in other ÖSYM exams is also present.

==== Preference selection ====
Applicants can view their exam location and results on ÖSYM AİS, and make their preference selection using the same system. Applicants may to select between 24–30 programs. These quantities vary depending on the year.

==== Minimum and maximum scores ====
The minimum score is the score of the last student admitted to a relevant field during the previous year. The minimum ranking is the ranking of the last student admitted. The maximum score and maximum ranking are the exact opposite. The minimum score is relevant in admissions, although the minimum ranking is perceived as more important. Generally, if the applicant's score is close to the minimum score, their ranking is also close to the minimum ranking. The scores and rankings for the relevant fields vary from year to year. This is due to the variance in exam difficulty and the average success of students who take the exam each year. However, since the best indicator of a school's capacity and enrollment rate is the ranking of the student who scored lowest in the previous year (the minimum score is the score this student received on the exam), looking at that student's ranking provides a more reliable way to make a selection. Consequently, examining the previous year's minimum success ranking in the exam instead of the minimum score provides a more accurate preference insight, this method does not guarantee complete accurate information. To gain accurate information, both minimum scores and rankings should be considered together, and conclusions should be drawn from comparisons with the previous years.

== Criticism ==
In 2005, "Life = 180 minutes?" was a slogan used by the Turkish Education Association criticizing the ÖSS system for attempting to encompass all the work of a student throughout their 12 years of academic life in a 3-hour multiple choice exam. The president of the ÖSYM exam board said that "ÖSS is the only available university entrance system until the number of people who apply to universities is lowered."

For a student, the education they receive at school is seen as not enough to succeed in ÖSS. Therefore, there is a huge sector in Turkey of private evening and weekend cram schools ("dershane") all around the country. These institutions prepare students solely for exams, including university entrance exams. All "dershane"s compete with each other in order to create the "champion", the one to score the highest mark in Turkey. The dershane sector is bolstered every year by huge media interest as the results of the exam are disclosed and the students who rank in the top few appear on TV and in the newspapers. In 2011, ÖSYM charged newspapers 150000 TL for past exam questions, while forbidding television channels other than the state-owned Turkish Radio and Television Corporation from broadcasting the questions.

== See also ==
- Education in Turkey
- The Twenty Classes
