= Foreign Language Knowledge Level Determination Exam =

Language proficiency test in Turkey

- Acronym: YDS
- Type: Standardised test (either computer-delivered or paper-based).
- Administrator: Measuring, Selection and Placement Center
- Skills tested: Reading of and translation from and into non-native languages
- Purpose: To assess the foreign language proficiency of Turkish speakers.
- Year started: 2013; 13 years ago
- Duration: 3 hours.
- Score range: 0 to 100, in 1.25 band increments.
- Score validity: 5 Years
- Restrictions on attempts: none
- Regions: Turkey
- Languages: Arabic; Bulgarian; English; French; German; Greek; Italian; Persian; Spanish; Russian Translation-based exams: Albanian; Armenian; Bosnian; Chinese; Danish; Dutch; Hungarian; Japanese; Korean; Polish; Portuguese; Romanian; Serbian; Ukrainian
- Prerequisites: No official prerequisite. Intended for Turkish speakers.
- Used by: Universities, institutions and government agencies in Turkey
- Website: www.osym.gov.tr

The Foreign Language Knowledge Level Determination Exam or YDS (Turkish: Yabancı Dil Bilgisi Seviye Tespit Sınavı) is a foreign language proficiency test administered by ÖSYM in Turkey in order to evaluate the foreign-language skills, especially of governmental employees. While anyone can take it, it is mostly taken by civil servants, academics and military personnel. The state pays extra money to public servants and employees of state agencies depending on their score on the test, and also uses this test to appoint employees to the positions located out of the country.

The test is administered every six months and is taken by more than 100,000 people. It can be taken electronically.

It is administered in several languages, but mainly in English. It is carried out in several cities throughout Turkey on the first Sundays of May and November.

The test consists of 80 multiple-choice questions to be finished within 180 minutes. The questions mainly deal with English vocabulary, English language grammatical structures, sentence completion, English to Turkish translation, Turkish to English translation, English paragraph completion, locating the irrelevant sentence in a paragraph, restatement, dialogue completion and reading comprehension passages.

The fact that the test evaluates only the reading comprehension skills while ignoring the listening, speaking and writing skills has been harshly criticised.
