= Measuring, Selection and Placement Center =

Turkish government body

- Ölçme, Seçme ve Yerleştirme Merkezi
- Established: 1973
- Founder: Law enacted by Grand National Assembly
- Purpose: Student and civil servant selection
- Location: Bilkent, Ankara, Turkey
- Owner: Turkey
- Website: www.osym.gov.tr
- Formerly called: Öğrenci Seçme ve Yerleştirme Merkezi

The Measuring, Selection and Placement Center (Turkish: Ölçme, Seçme ve Yerleştirme Merkezi, ÖSYM) is the body responsible for organizing the national level university entrance examination Student Selection and Placement System, and several other large scale examinations in Turkey. It was founded in 1974 and its headquarters is in Ankara.

ÖSYM also operates the world's one and only government-operated dedicated large scale (5600 people at a time) computer-based test center.

== Foreign language exams ==
- Foreign Language Exam (Turkish: Yabancı Dil Sınavı, YDS), there are also:
- YÖKDİL, a test in a similar format to YDS, but limited to Turkish universities in validity
- YKS-YDT, the foreign language part of the Student Selection and Placement System
- a section of the teacher's exam (ÖABT) for foreign language teachers.

== See also ==
- Education in Turkey
