= Malatya =

- Metropolitan center
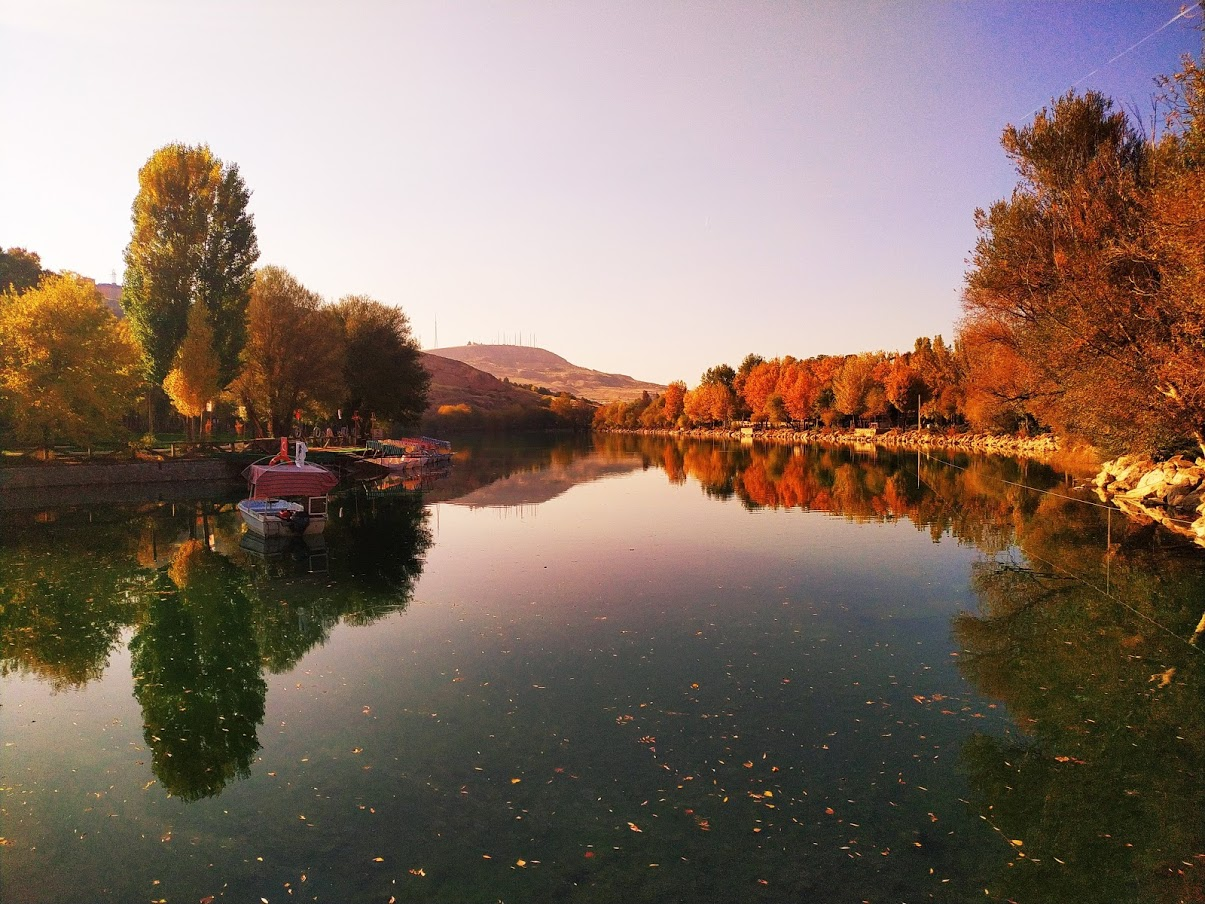
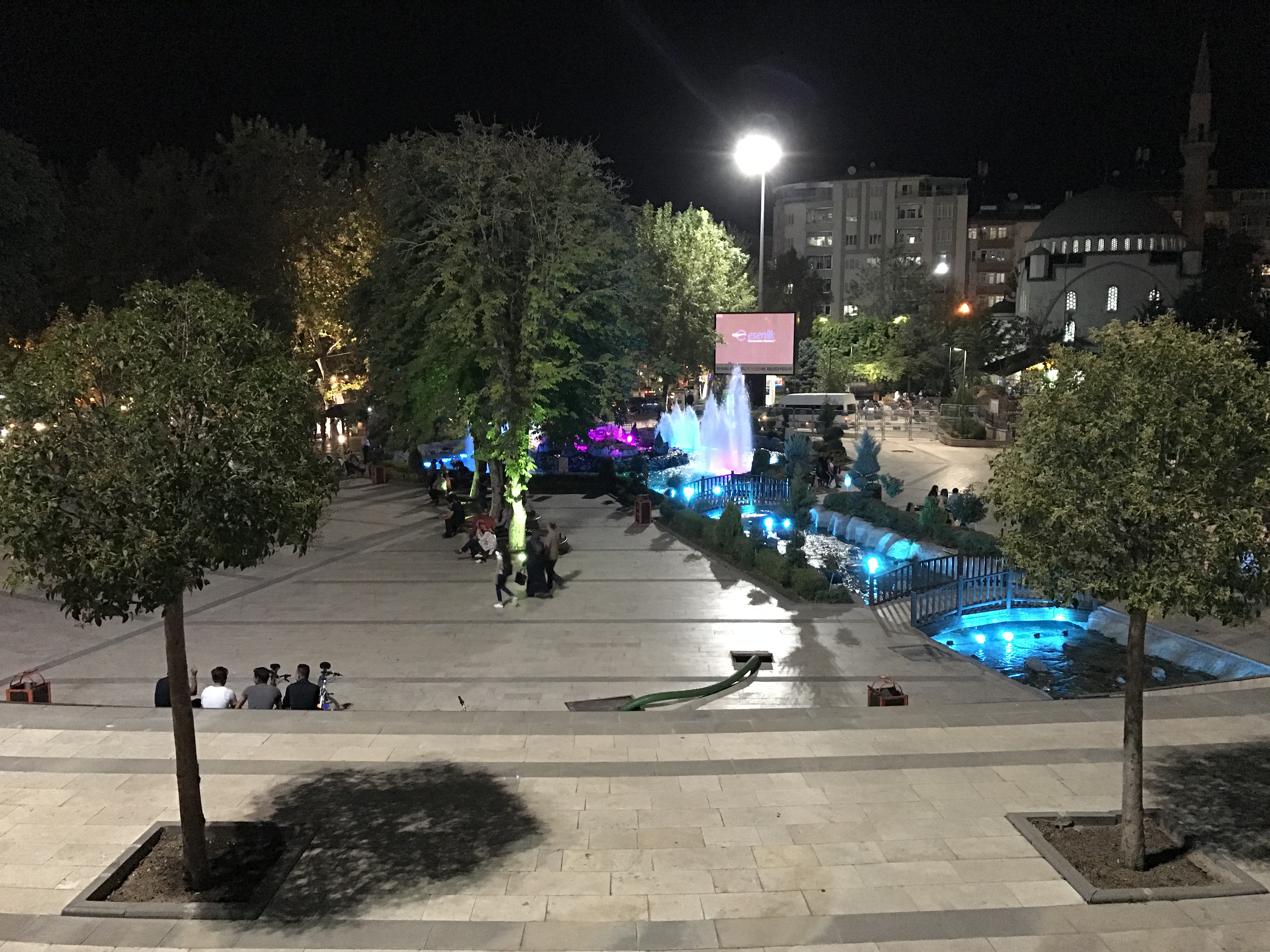
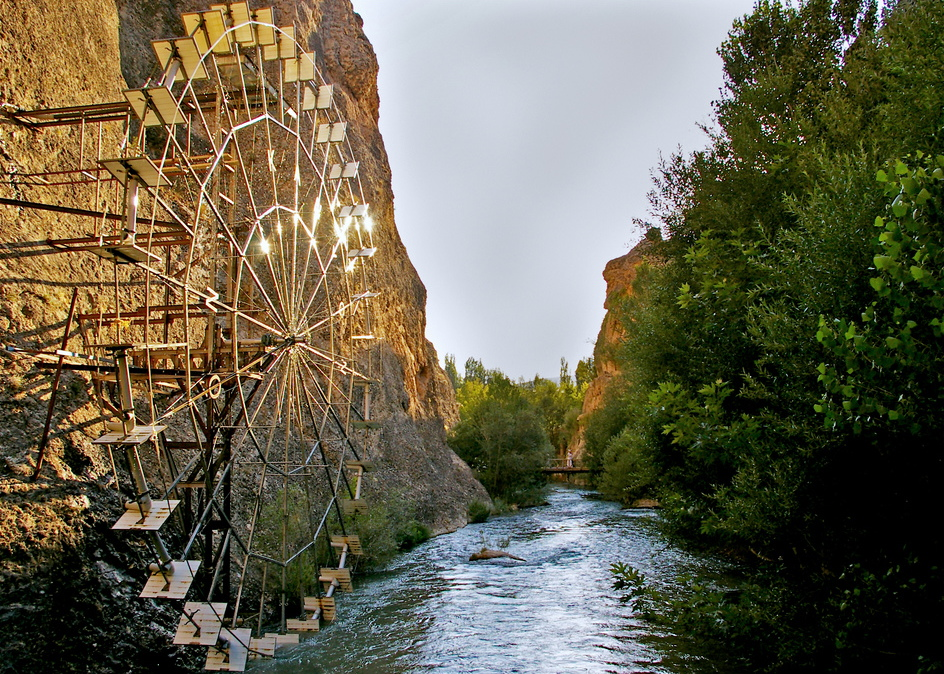
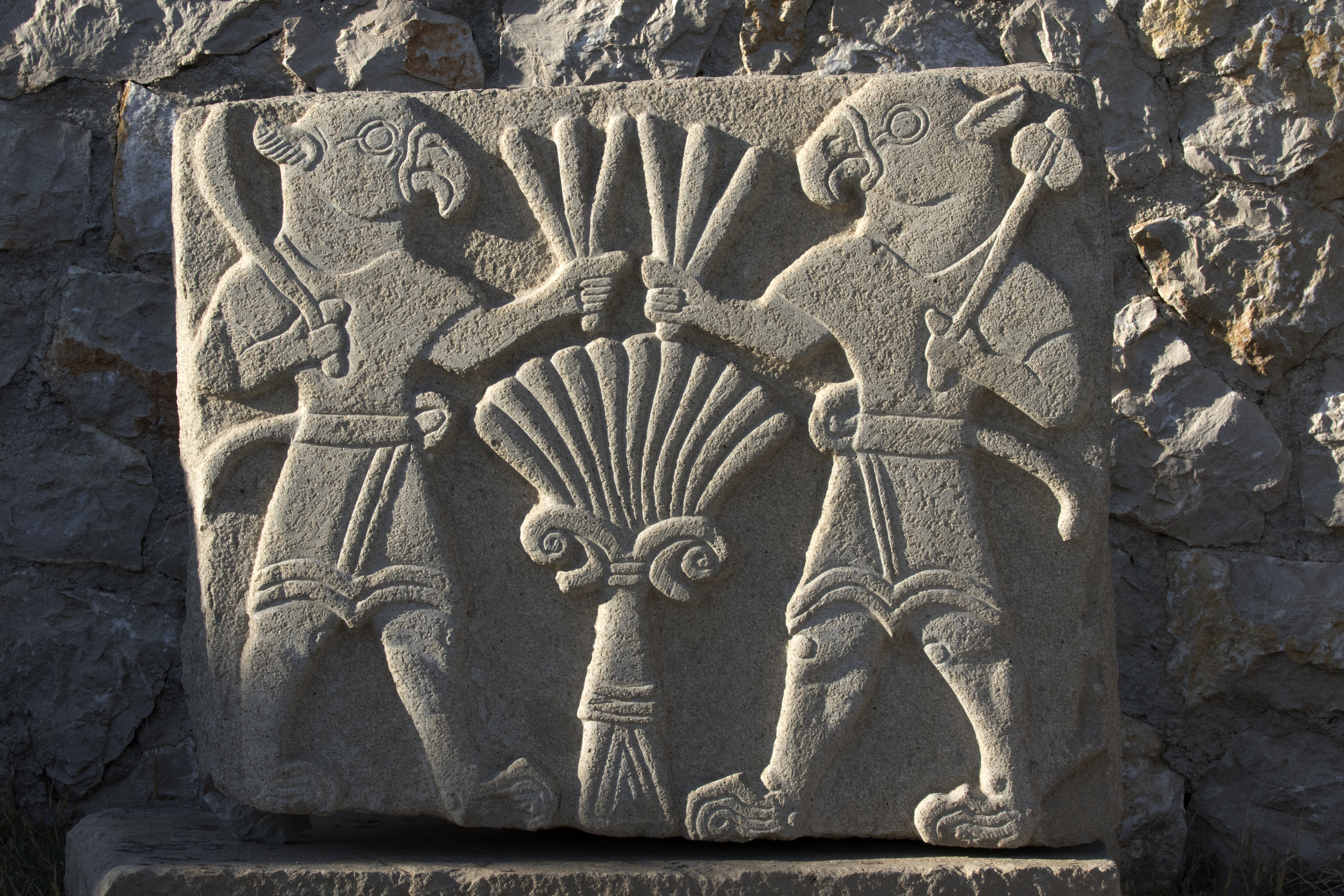
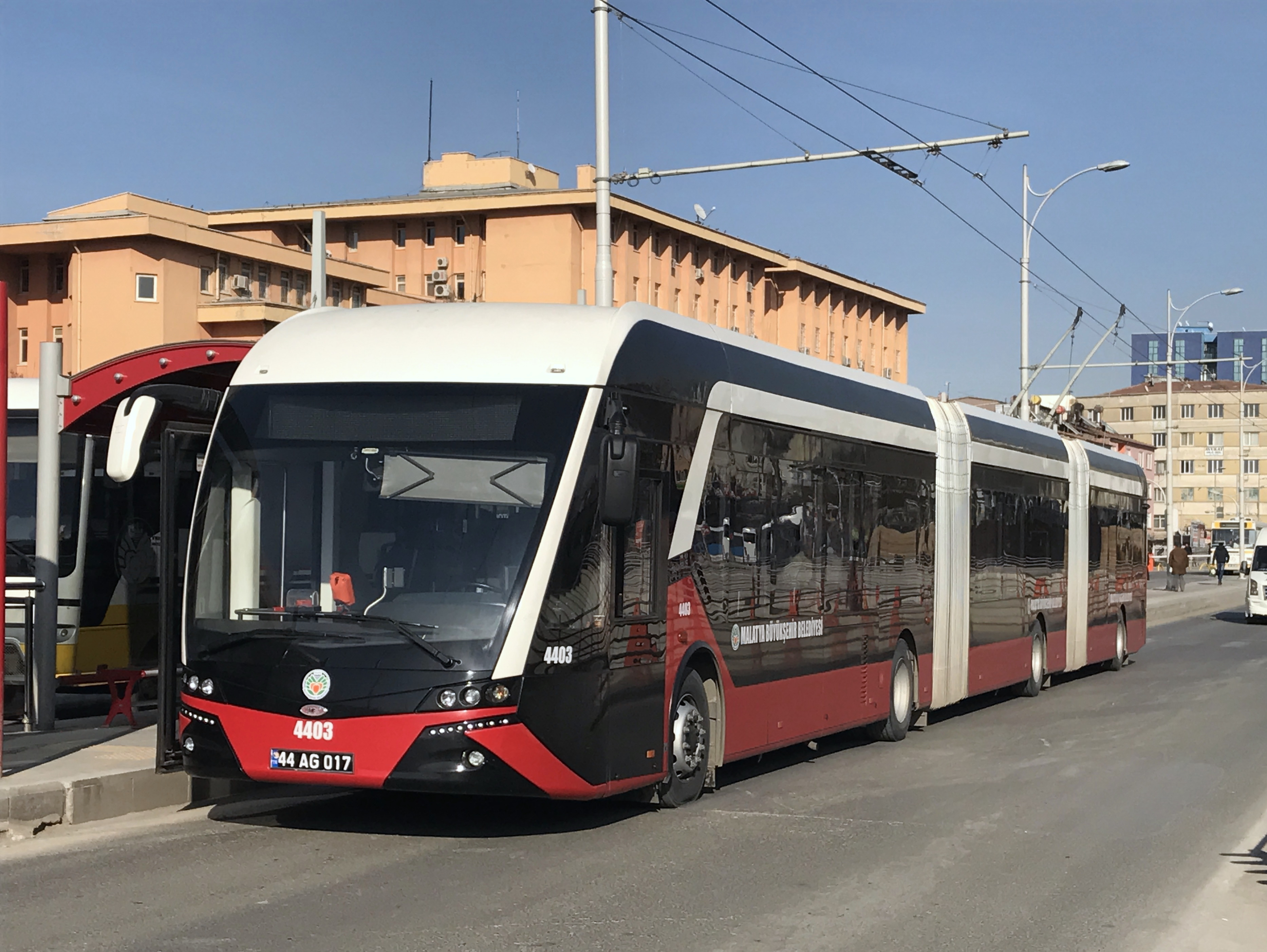
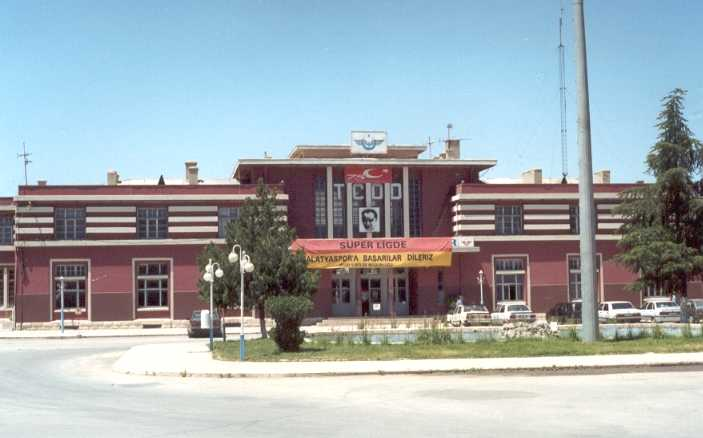
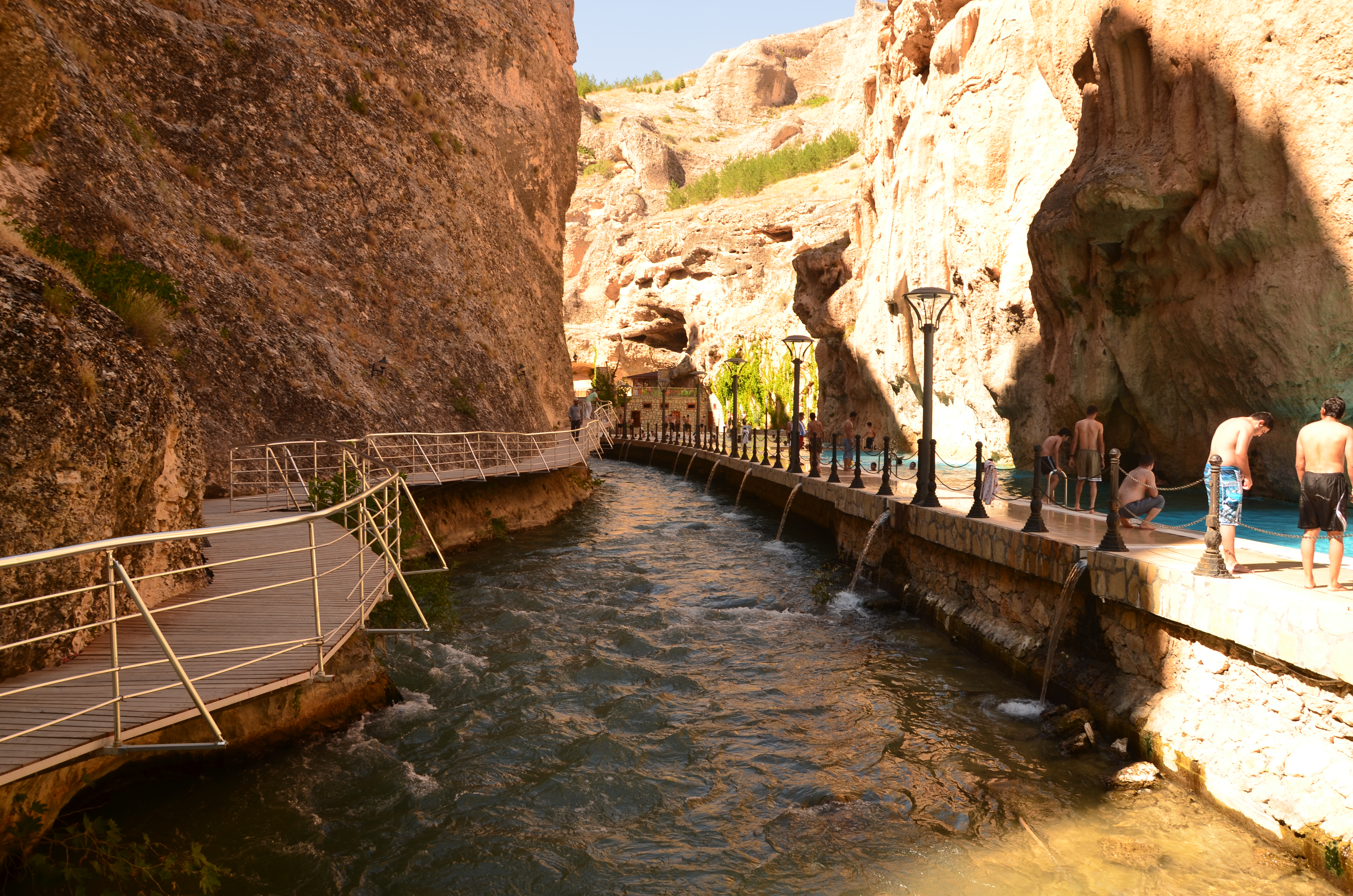
- Turgut Özal Nature Park Kernek Square Acizane Mill Arslantepe Mound Malatya Trambus Malatya railway station Tohma Canyon

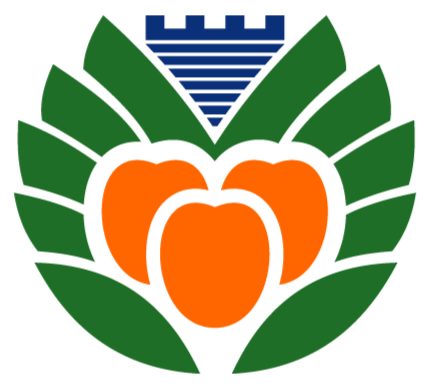
- Seal of Malatya Metropolitan Municipality
- Nickname(s): Land of Apricots (Turkish: Kayısı Diyarı)
- Motto(s): Malatya, the Epic City That Made Anatolia a Homeland
- Location of Malatya Malatya (Asia) Malatya (Europe)
- Coordinates: 38°21′0.65″N 38°19′0.01″E
- Country: Turkey
- Region: Eastern Anatolia Region
- Province: Malatya
- Central districts: Battalgazi, Yeşilyurt
- First settlement: c. 5000 BC (Arslantepe Mound)

Government
  - Type: Mayor–council
  - Body: Metropolitan Council
  - Mayor: Sami Er (AK Party)
  - Governor: Seddar Yavuz

Area
  - Total: 12,313 km^{2} (4,754 sq mi)
  - Rank: 23rd
- Elevation: 954 m (3,130 ft)

Population (2024)
  - Total: 742,185
  - Rank: 28th
  - Density: 60/km^{2} (160/sq mi)
- Time zone: UTC+03 (TRT)
- Postal code: 44XXX
- Area code: +90 422
- ISO 3166 code: TR-44
- Vehicle registration: 44
- Demonym: Malatyalı
- GDP (nominal): 2024
  - Total: ₺156.4 billion
  - Per capita: ₺210,748
- HDI (2022): ▲0.812 (very high) · 22nd
- Website: malatya.bel.tr

Malatya (Note: Ottoman Turkish: ملاطیه; Armenian: Մալաթիա Malat'ia; Kurdish: Meletî Greek: Μελιτηνή Melitini) is a metropolitan municipality and the capital of Malatya Province in the Eastern Anatolia Region of Turkey. It is a major regional center for industry, healthcare, education, and agriculture, and is the global hub for apricot production and export.

The name of the city is thought to derive from the Hittite word melid or milit, meaning "honey". Throughout history, the city has been known as Malidiya in Hittite, Meliddu in Akkadian, Meliṭeia in Urartian, and Melitene during the Roman period. The ancient geographer Strabon noted that the inhabitants of Melitene shared the same language and culture as the Cappadocians and Cataonians.

The ruins of ancient Melitene are located around Arslantepe in the present-day Battalgazi district. The historical city remained at Battalgazi (formerly known as Old Malatya) until the 19th century, when it gradually relocated to its modern site.

Malatya is one of the most prominent apricot-growing areas in the world. A significant portion of Turkey's dried apricot production is cultivated in Malatya, earning the city the nickname "Land of Apricots" (Kayısı Diyarı).

== History ==
=== Arslantepe ===
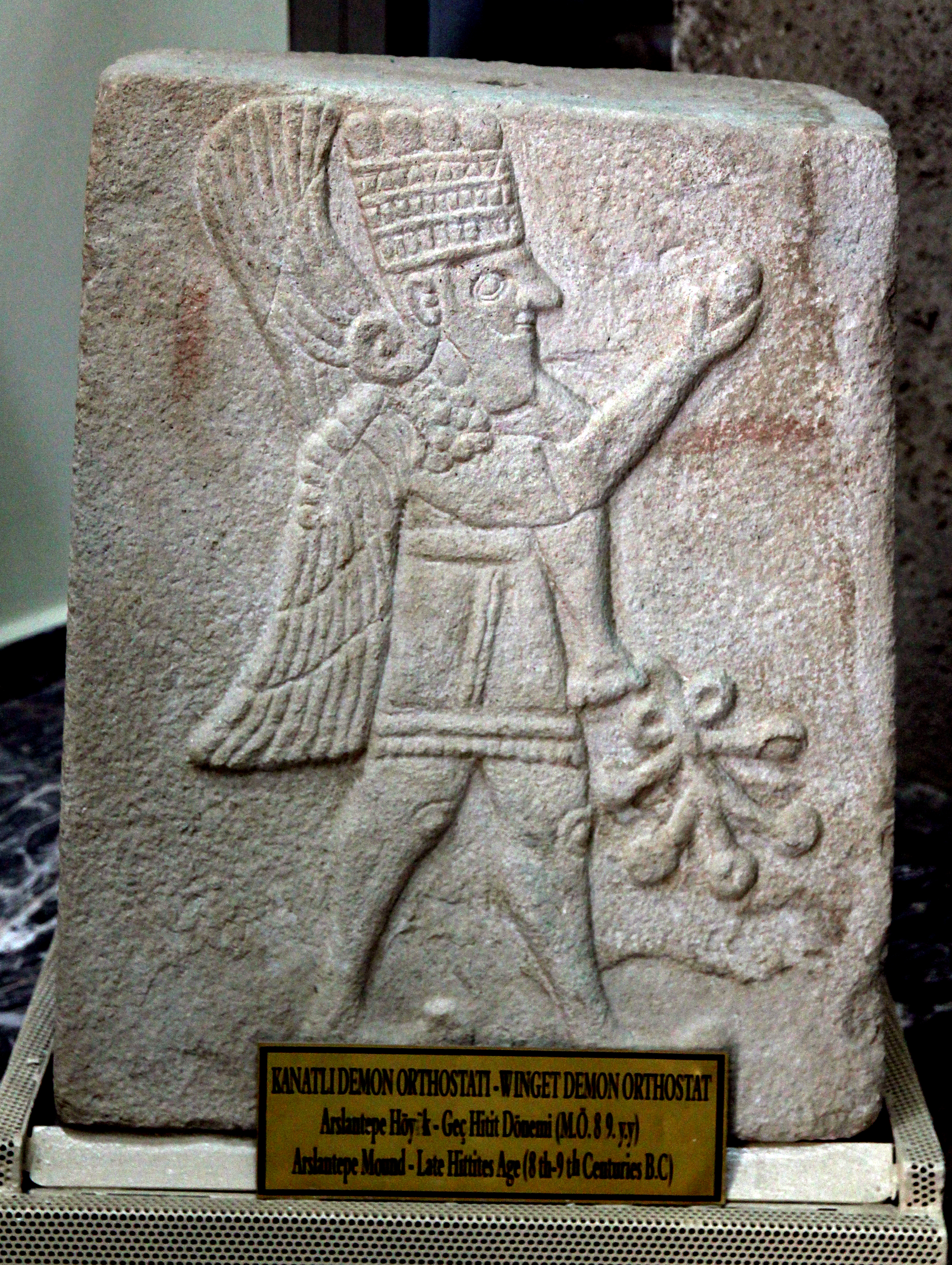
Archaeological Museum of Malatya, Türkiye, Late Hittite stele from Arslantepe

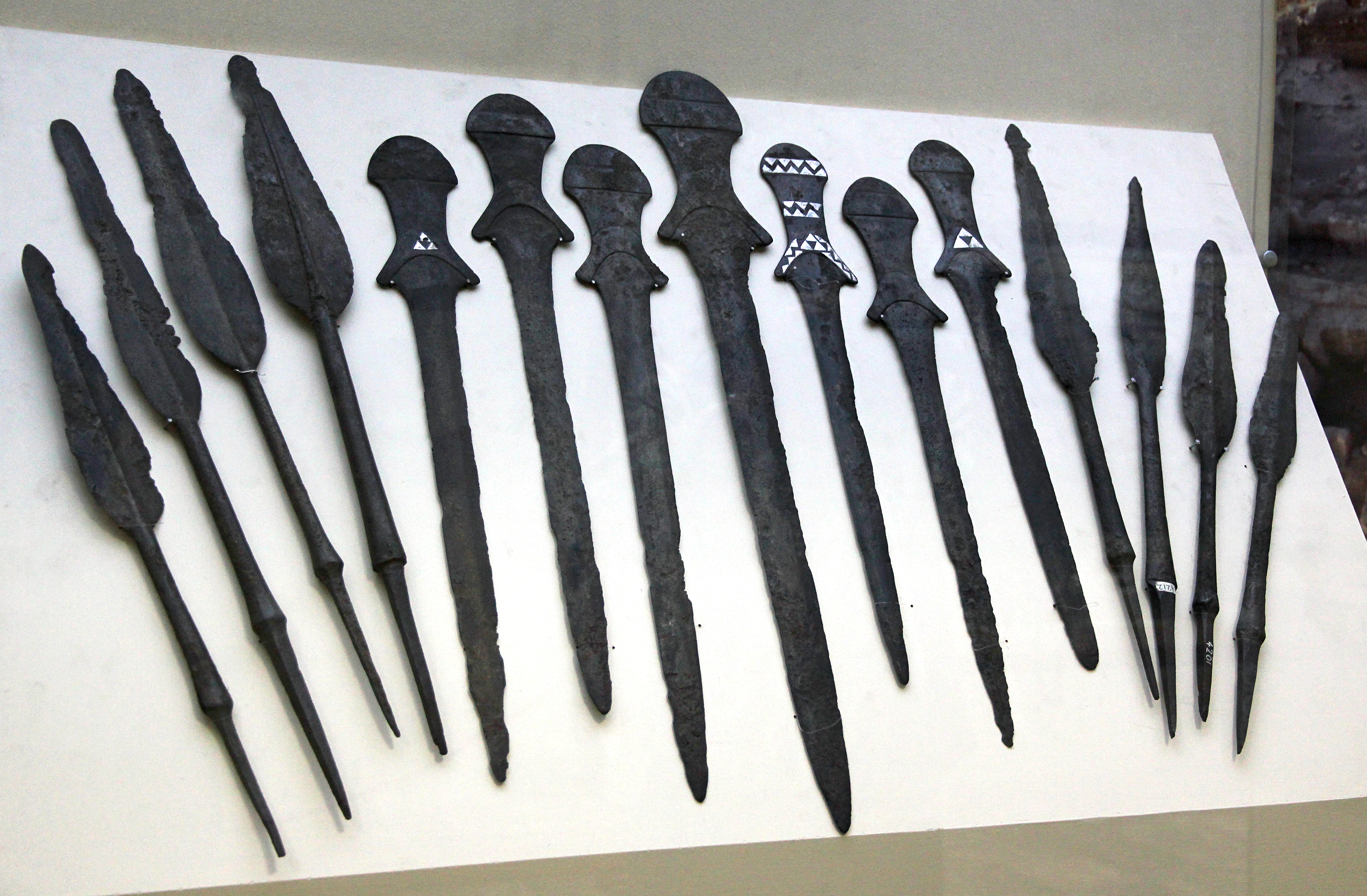
Bronze Age swords from Arslantepe, c.3000 BC, in the Malatya Museum

Arslantepe has been inhabited since the development of agriculture in the Fertile Crescent, nearly 6,000 years ago. From the Bronze Age, the site became an administrative center of a larger region in the kingdom of Isuwa. The city was heavily fortified. The Hittites conquered the city in the fourteenth century BC. In the Hittite language, melid or milit means "honey." The name was mentioned in the contemporary sources under several variations (e.g., Hittite: Malidiya and possibly also Midduwa; Akkadian: Meliddu; Urartian: Meliṭeia).

After the end of the Hittite Empire, the city became the center of the Neo-Hittite state of Kammanu. The city continued old Hittite traditions and styles. Researchers have discovered a palace inside the city walls with statues and reliefs. A palace was erected with monumental stone sculptures of lions and the ruler. Kammanu was a vassal state of Urartu between 804 and 743.

According to Igor Diakonoff and John Greppin, there was likely an Armenian presence in Melid by 1200 BC.

The Neo-Assyrian king Tiglath-Pileser I (1115–1077 B.C.) forced the kingdom of Malidiya to pay tribute to Assyria. The Neo-Assyrian king Sargon II (722–705) sacked the city in 712 BC. At the same time, the Cimmerians and Scythians invaded Anatolia and the city declined. Some occupation continued on the site into the Hellenistic and Roman periods—a smithy with four ovens has been excavated from the Roman period. There was a long gap in occupation between the mid-7th century and renewed use of the site in the late 12th or early 13th century.

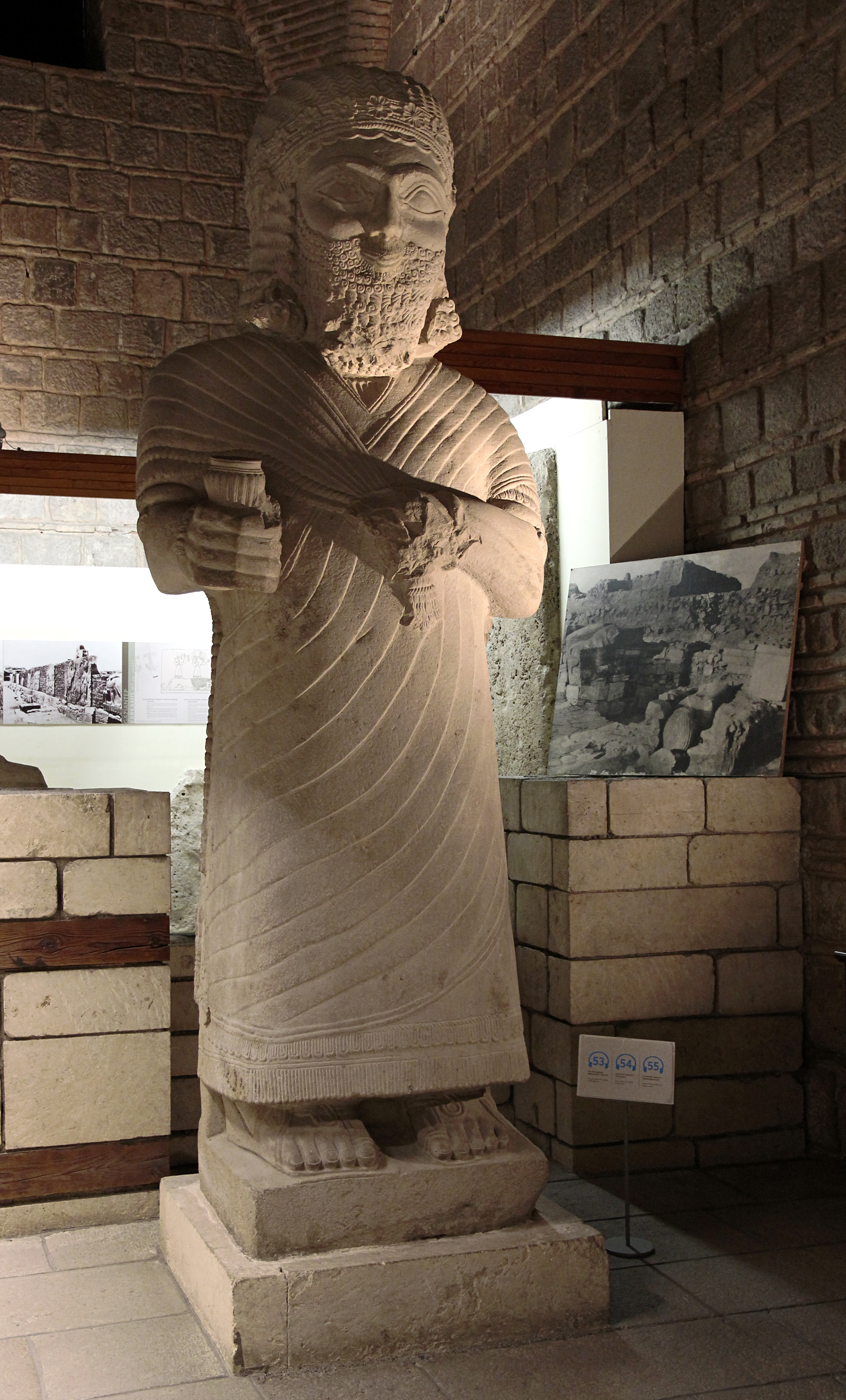
Statue Malatya A/12 from Arslantepe, probably of King Mutallu of Kummuh, Museum of Anatolian Civilizations, Ankara.

Archeologists first began to excavate the site of Arslantepe in the 1930s, led by French archaeologist Louis Delaporte. Since 1961 an Italian team of archaeologists, led by Marcella Frangipane in the early 21st century, has been working at the site.

From the 6th century BC, Melid was ruled by the Armenian Orontid Dynasty, who were subjects of the Achaemenid Empire. After periods of Achaemenid and Macedonian rule, Melid (Malatya) was part of the Kingdom of Lesser Armenia.

=== Melitene during the Roman Empire ===
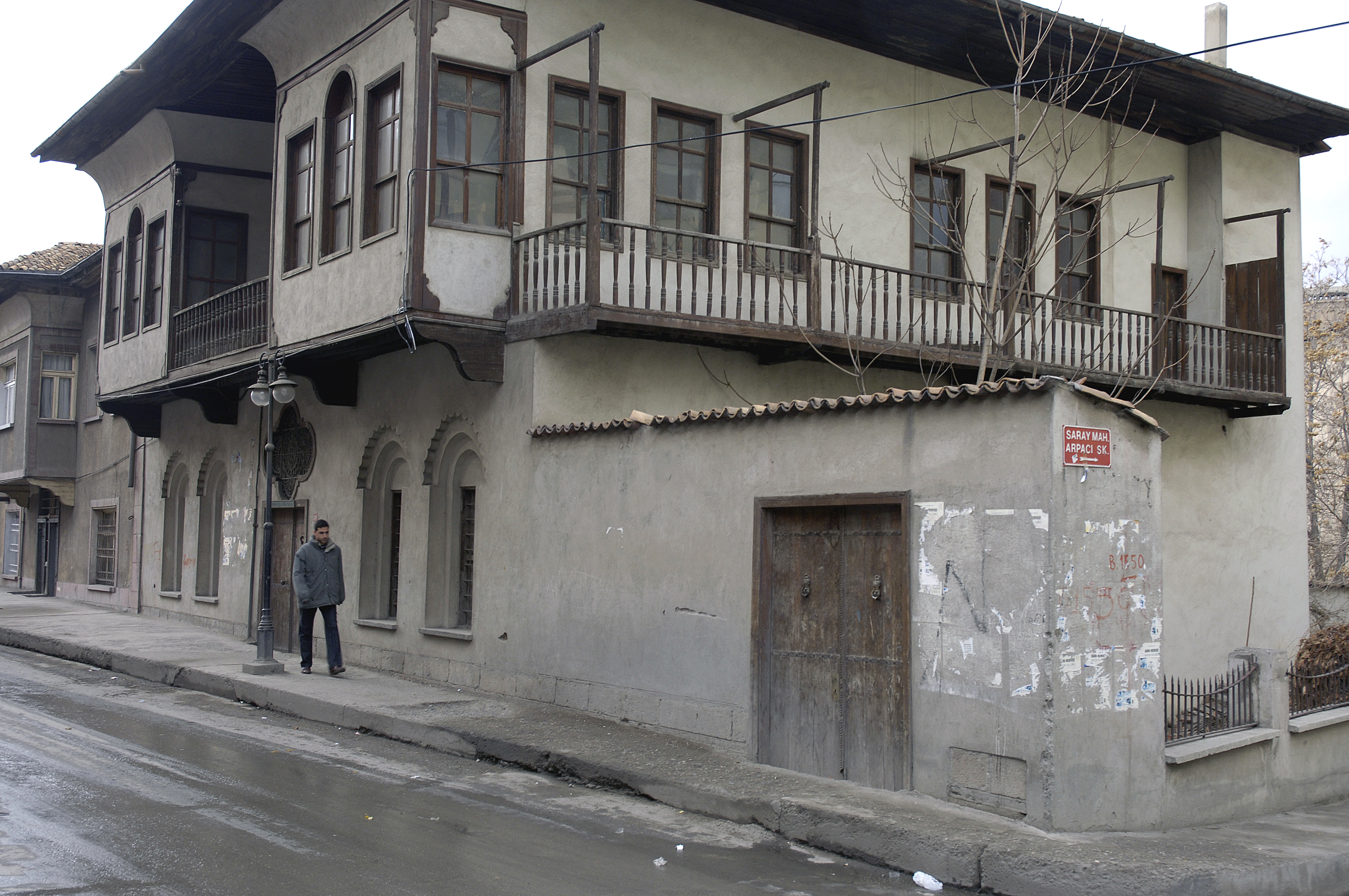
Malatya historic houses

Diodorus Siculus wrote that Ptolemaeus of Commagene attacked and captured Melitene from the Kingdom of Cappadocia, but couldn't keep it for long since Ariarathes V of Cappadocia marched against him with a strong army, and Ptolemaeus withdrew. The Kingdom of Cappadocia, ruled by the House of Ariobarzanes (95–36 BC), became a Roman client in 63 BC. After the Kingdom's annexation by the Roman Empire in 17 AD, the settlement was re-established as Melitene in 72 AD on a different site, as the base camp of Legio XII Fulminata (which continued to be based there until at least the early 5th century according to Notitia Dignitatum). The legionary base of Melitene controlled access to southern Armenia and the upper Tigris. It was the end point of the important highway running east from Caesarea (modern Kayseri). The camp attracted a civilian population and was probably granted city status by Trajan in the early 2nd century AD, with the rank of Municipium. It is known for being a prolific source of imperial coins minted from the 3rd to the early 5th centuries.

Procopius wrote admiringly of the temples, agoras and theatres of Melitene, but no evidence of them now remains. It was a major center in the province of Armenia Minor (Armenian: Փոքր Հայք Pokr Hayk,) created by Diocletian from territory separated from the province of Cappadocia. In 392 A.D., emperor Theodosius I divided Armenia Minor into two new provinces: First Armenia, with its capital at Sebasteia (modern Sivas); and Second Armenia, with its capital at Melitene.

=== Melitene during the Middle Ages ===
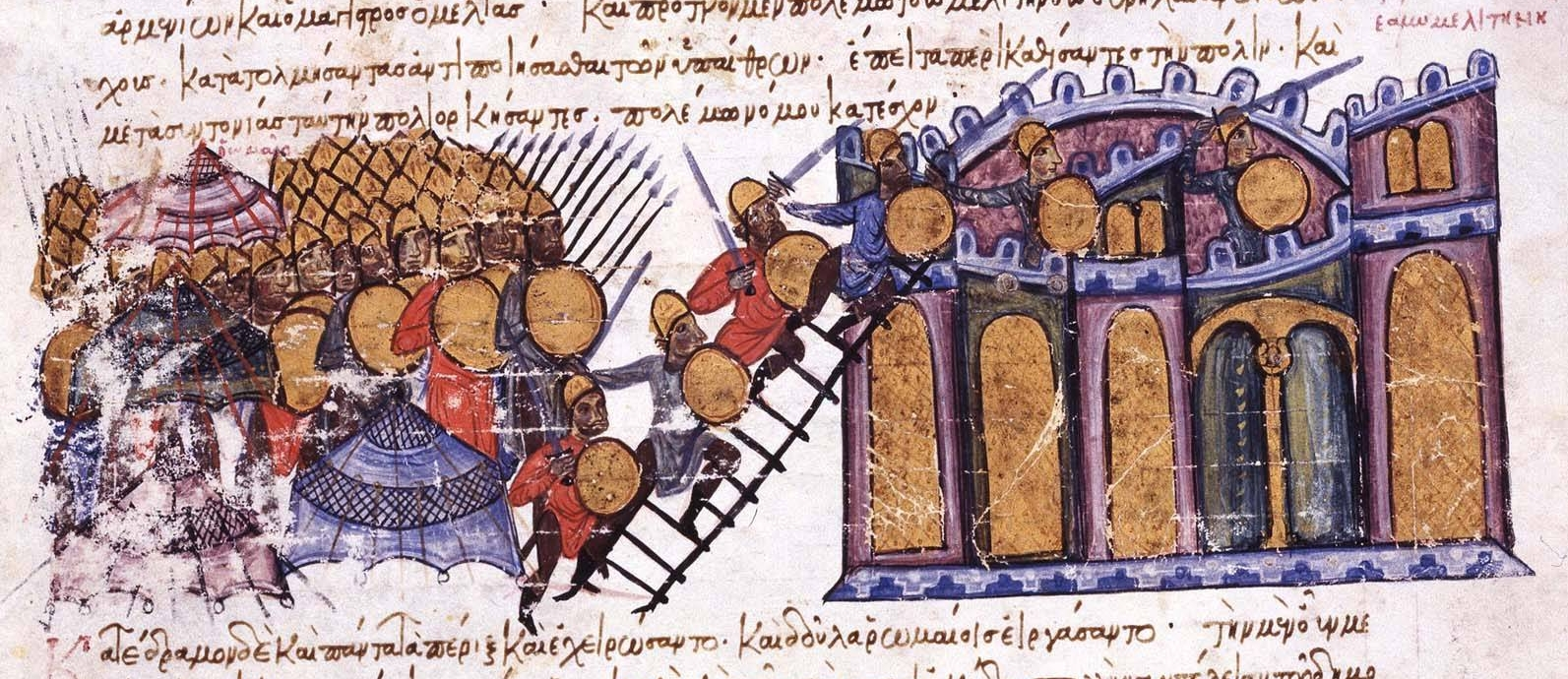
Capture of Melitene by the Byzantines in 934

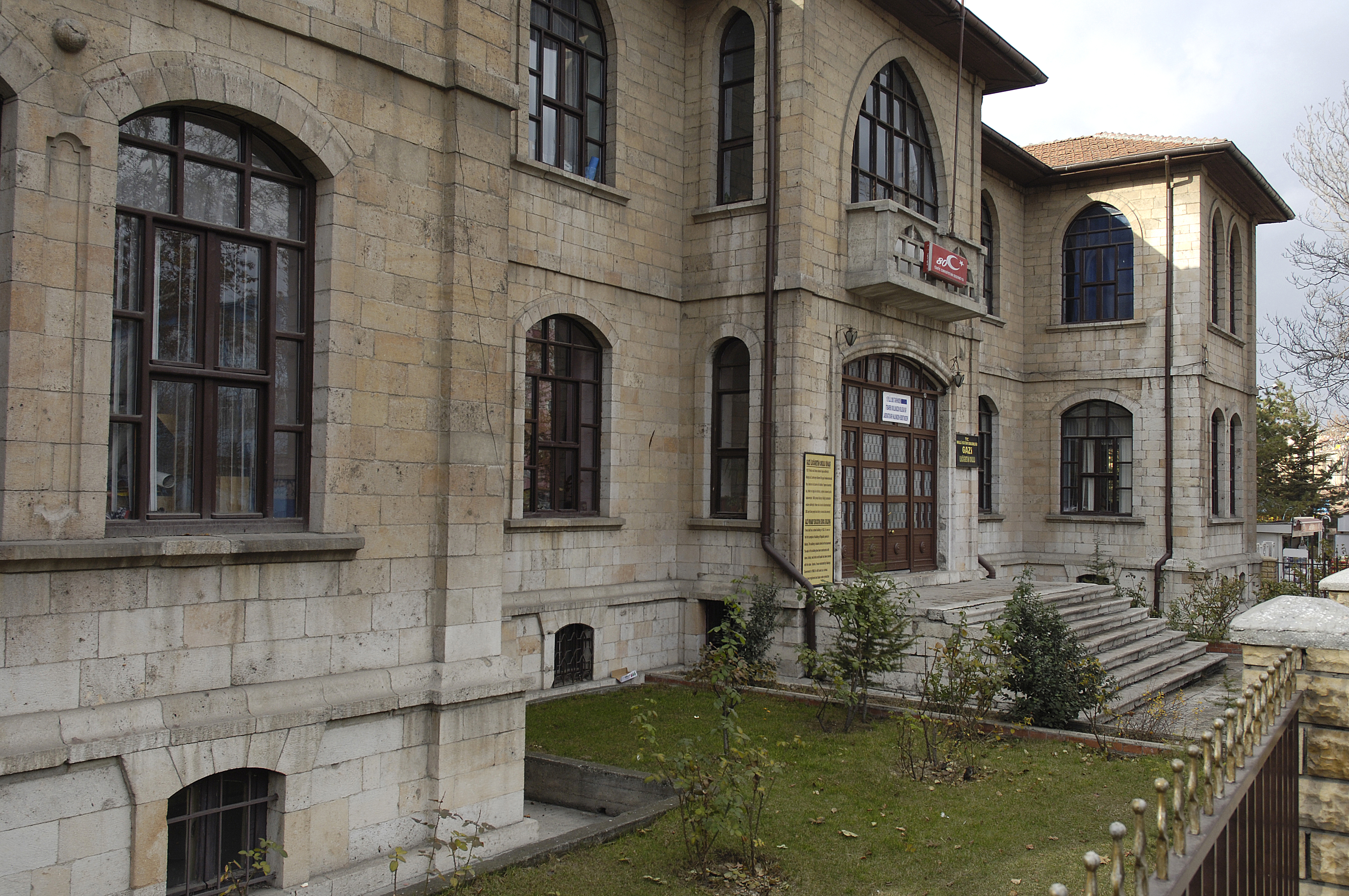
Malatya Gazi Primary School Building

During the reign of the Emperor Justinian I (527–565), administrative reforms were carried out in this region: The province of Second Armenia was renamed Third Armenia (Armenia Tertia), with its territory unchanged and its capital still at Melitene. Melitene's city walls were constructed in the 6th century by the emperors Anastasius and Justinian. Those that still stand mostly date from the Arab period, perhaps of the 8th century, though retaining the layout of and some remnants from earlier building phases. The city was sacked by the Sassanids in 575, but it recovered and was made in 591 the capital of Armenia Prima by emperor Maurice. The town contained many shrines to martyrs, including that of the widely venerated local saint Polyeuctus.

The city was captured by the Rashidun forces under Iyad ibn Ghanm, but the Byzantines quickly retook it until Mu'awiya I established a garrison in the town. The Arab colony was abandoned at some point during the reign of Abd al-Malik ibn Marwan until Hisham restored it, though it was destroyed by emperor Constantine V. The Abbasid al-Mansur then established it as a substantial outpost from which raids deep into the Byzantine Empire were conducted. Throughout the Dark Ages, the area between Melitene and Caeserea became a no-man's land of independent lords and villages. In the 9th century, under its semi-independent emir Umar al-Aqta, Malatya rose to become a major opponent of the Byzantine Empire until Umar was defeated and killed at the Battle of Lalakaon in 863. The Byzantines attacked the city many times, but did not finally take it until the campaigns of John Kourkouas in 927–934. After successively accepting and renouncing vassal status, the city was finally taken in May 934, its Muslim inhabitants driven out or forced to convert, and replaced by Greek and Armenian settlers.

The West Syrian diocese of Melitene has been established since the 6th century and was as well surrounded by other bishoprics belonging to nearby towns. In the 10th century the Emperor Nikephoros II Phokas convinced the Jacobite Patriarch of Antioch to move the head of the patriarchate into the region of Melitene. In the early 11th century, Melitene continued to act as a large commercial city that grew in wealth and prestige. The 12th-century historian Matthew of Edessa states that "its wealth was unlimited when it came to gold, silver, precious stones, pearls and brocades". The merchants of Melitene were so wealthy, that three sons of a Syriac Christian named Abu Imran were said to have built churches, nunneries, monasteries, and even struck the Byzantine imperial gold coinage for a year at their own expense. In addition, they are reported to have loaned emperor Basil II 100 centenaria of gold. Abu Salim, the eldest of the three brothers, is also stated to have ransomed 15,000 captured Christians from Turkish raiders at five dinars a head. The city was attacked and devastated by the Seljuks in 1058 and much of its population was either killed or sold into slavery. Matthew of Edessa states the following:

Melitene, from one end to the other, billowed with blood. Nor was there anyone to pity the old or the young. There one could see the bodies of glorious and distinguished (people) fallen and drenched in blood; children cut to pieces in the arms of their mothers, with blood and milk flowing together. Who can put into writing the divine wrath which the city of Melitene bore on that day? All the green plants of the fields were covered with blood, instead of sweet dew. After so much shedding of blood and captive-taking, they led before them into slavery beautiful and distinguished women, boys and girls, with an inestimable amount of gold and silver.

Around 1061/62, Melitene was refortified, through the funding of its own inhabitants, during the reign of Constantine X Doukas and enclosed an area of 35 hectars. That means it could have been home to 10,000-12,000 people and could have had a territorial population of an additional 80,000.

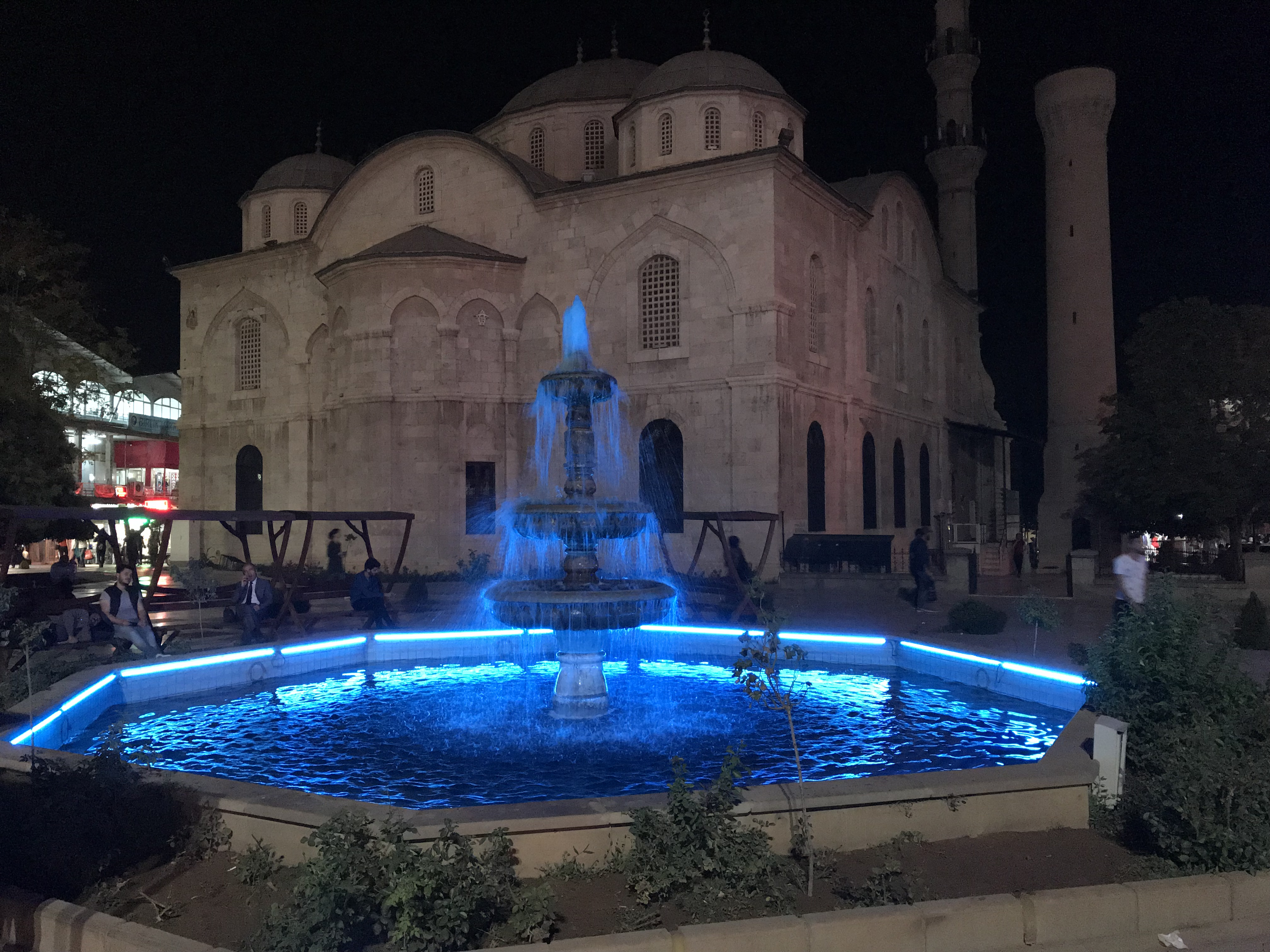
Yeni Cami is an example of Byzantine influence on Ottoman architecture. See Pammakaristos Church

In the period that followed the Turkish advance into the Byzantine Empire after the defeat at the Battle of Manzikert, Gabriel of Melitene, a Greek Orthodox Armenian who had risen from the ranks of the Byzantine army, governed the city. From 1086 to 1100 he preserved his independence with the aid of the Beylik of the Danishmends. After 1100, he sought to gain the favour of the commanders of the First Crusade, especially Bohemond I of Antioch and Baldwin of Boulogne.

The Danishmends took over Malatya one year later in 1101 following the Battle of Melitene. The Danishmends then fought repeatedly with the Anatolian Seljuk Sultanate about the possession of the city and were able to hold it until 1152, though the Seljuks did not gain full control until 1177. Under Danishmend and Seljuk rule, Malatya became a centre of knowledge as many Persian and Arabic scholars took residence in the city. The Seljuk Sultanate also undertook an extensive development of the city. After being ruled by the Ilkhanids for around 50 years at the end of the 13th century, the Muslim population of the city invited the Mamluk Sultanate to Malatya in 1315. On 28 April 1315, the Mamluk army entered the city; this was followed by the looting of the city by the army. The Eretnid dynasty gained sovereignty over the city for some time, but from 1338 onwards the Mamluks secured its control. However, for the latter part of the 14th century, the control of the city fluctuated between the Mamluks and the Dulkadirids.

Because of these wars, the metropolitan Theodosius of Melitene "had been deprived of the consecrated seat by the foreigners", and was instead bestowed the metropolitan of Keltzene in 1318-1319. The last mention of a metropolitan in Melitene was in 1329, after which the seat remained vacant and disappeared before the 15th century.

The city was captured by the Ottoman army led by Yavuz Sultan Selim on 28 July 1516 and remained under Ottoman rule until the establishment of the Republic of Turkey. Under the Ottomans, the city lost the quality of being on the frontiers, as well as the allure it held in the Middle Ages. It was plagued between the 16th and 18th centuries by successive rebellions.

=== Modern period ===
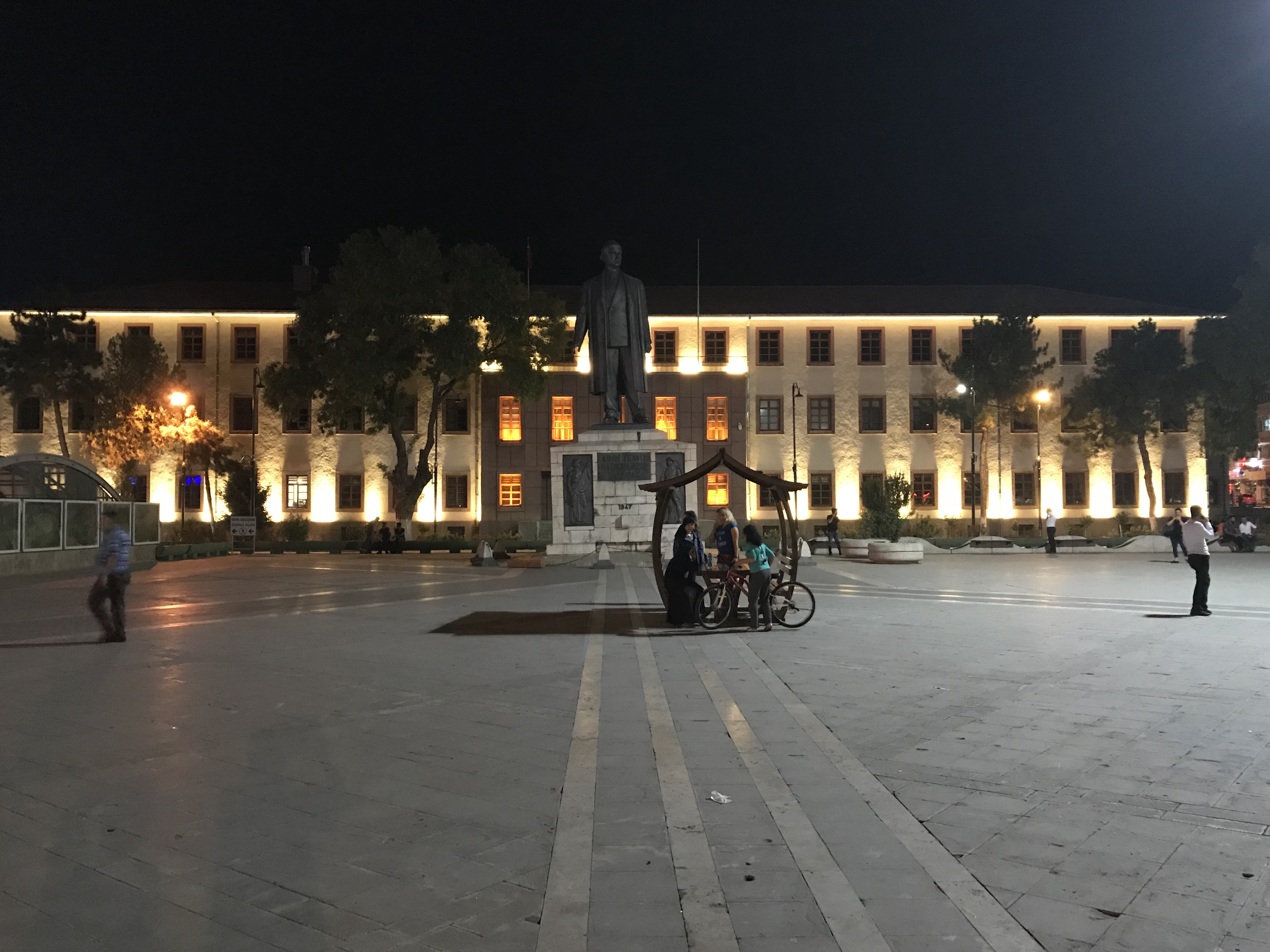
City Hall of Malatya

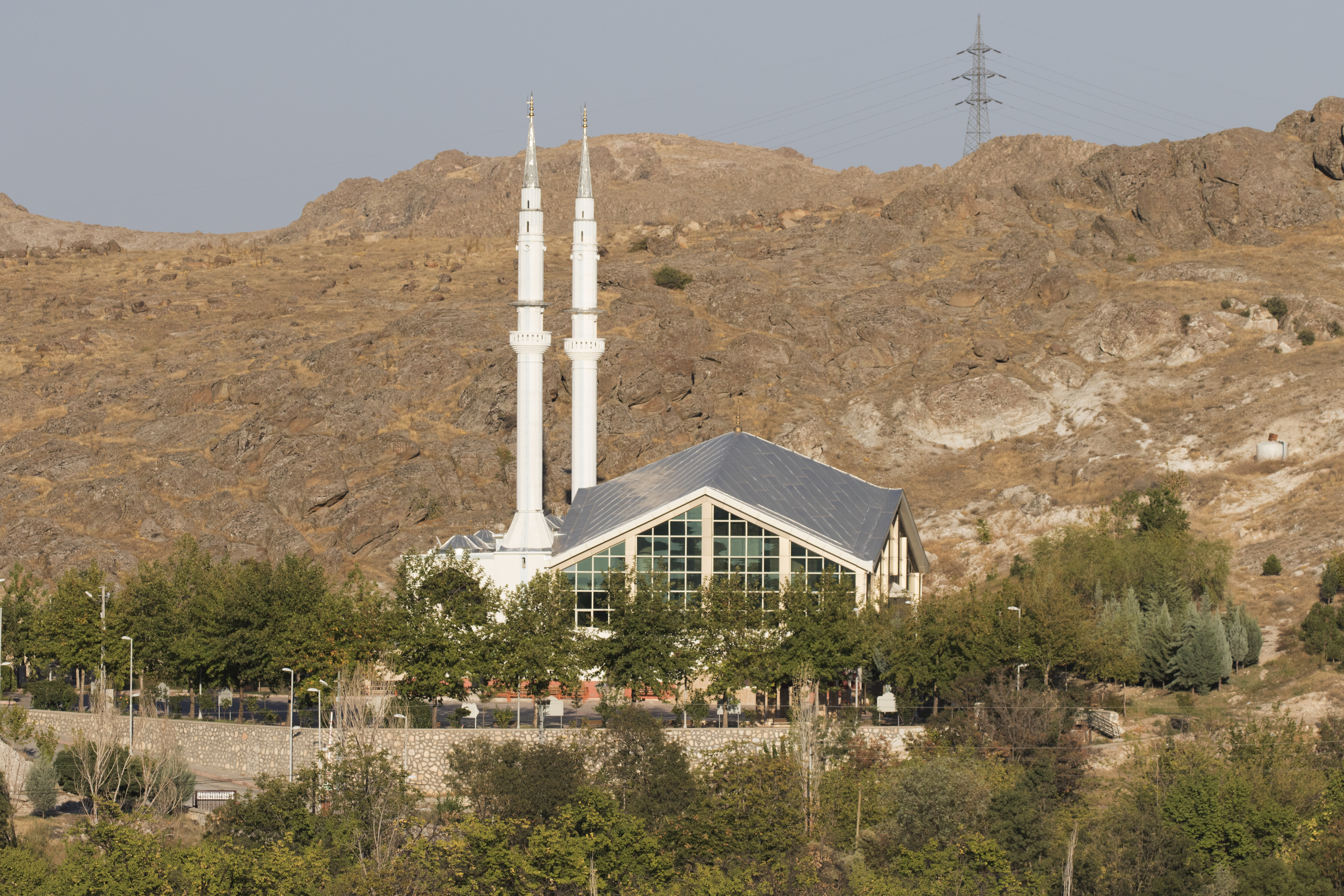
A modern mosque in Malatya

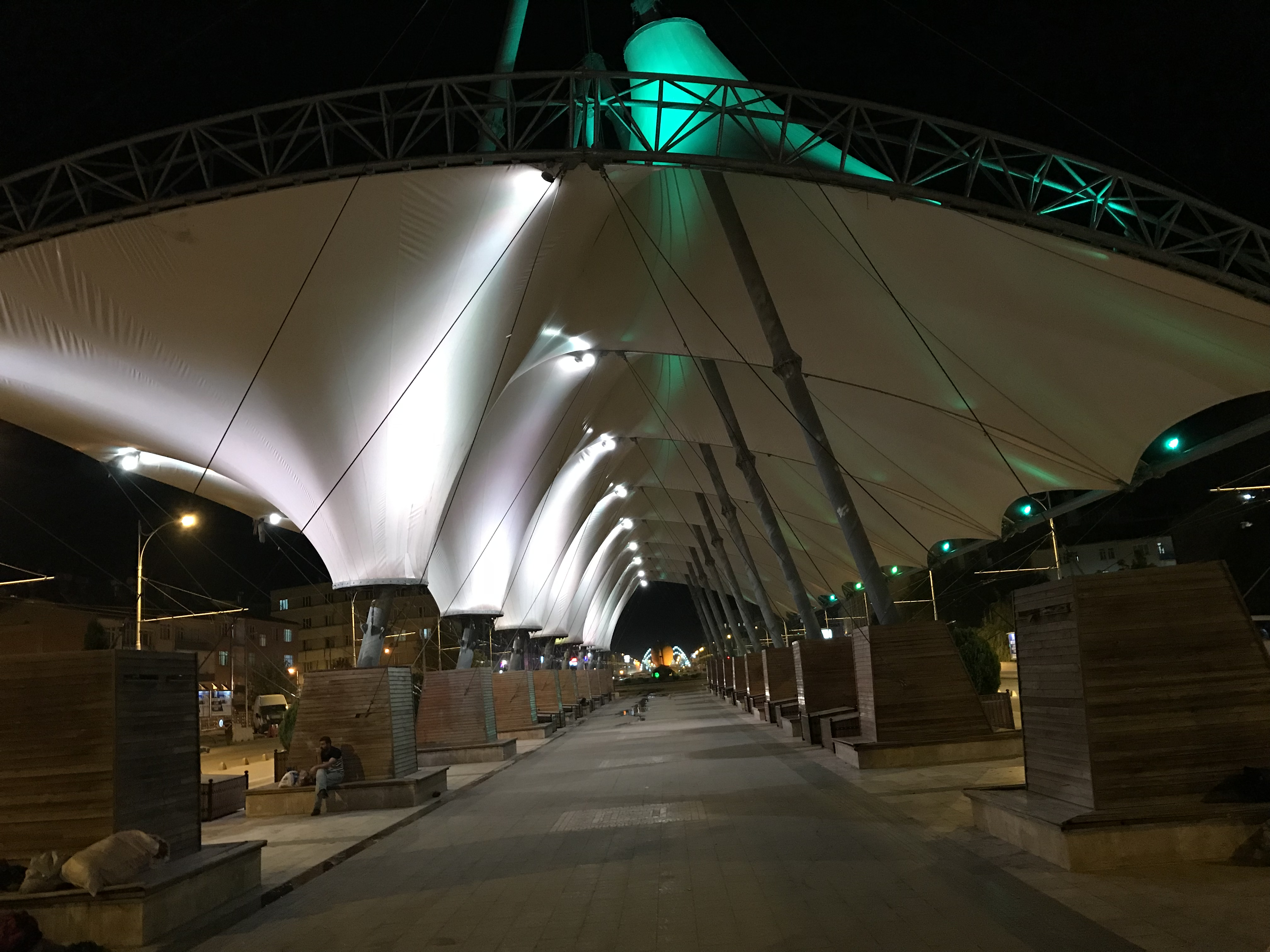
Malatya Main Bus Station

The current city of Malatya was founded in 1838, with the old site of Militene now designated as Old Malatya. The reason behind the displacement of the city center was that the Ottoman army settled and stayed, probably by seizing from its settlers, in the previous city center, in the winter of 1838–39, before taking the road for Battle of Nezib in 1849. Because of this, citizens of the Malatya established the new city based on a near town called Aspuzu. The city saw rapid expansion in the 19th century, and by the end of the century it had around 5,000 households, 50 mosques, six madrasas, nine inns and five hammams. Ottoman sources also recorded ten churches. In 1889 and 1890, Malatya was struck by two large fires that destroyed thousands of shops. The city was then hit by the 1893 Malatya earthquake, which killed 1,300, destroying 1,200 houses and four mosques. A cholera outbreak that subsequently took place in 1893 killed 896 people. The destroyed buildings were rebuilt in 1894. Malatya was the scene of anti-Armenian violence during the late nineteenth and early twentieth centuries. During the Hamidian massacres of 1895–1896, 7,500 Armenian civilians were massacred and Armenian villages in the rural countryside of Malatya were destroyed. In the aftermath, a Red Cross team sent to Malatya and led by Julian B. Hubbell concluded that 1,500 Armenian houses had been pillaged and 375 burned to the ground. According to the 1913 Catholic Encyclopedia, Malatya city was inhabited by 30,000 people with a clear ethnic Turkish majority, and an Armenian population of 3,000, of whom 800 were Catholics. Of the five churches in the city, three belonged to the Armenians. In the spring of 1915, the vast majority of the Armenians of the town were rounded up by Ottoman authorities and deported on death marches as part of the Armenian genocide. According to reports of the governor of the Malatya district, of the 6,935 registered Armenians in Malatya, 197 were left in the town as artisans. In the early Republican era, Malatya became the centre of Malatya Province and enjoyed a substantial growth in terms of population as well as covered area. This development was further accelerated by the construction of the Adana-Fevzipaşa-Malatya railroad in 1931, and a few years later in 1937, by the construction of the Sivas-Malatya railroad.

Until recently the city was home to departments of the Turkish Aeronautical Association, Turkish Hearths, and Turkish Red Crescent. In 2014 Malatya became a metropolitan municipality in Turkey, alongside 12 other cities, by a Turkish governmental law that was passed in 2012. Following the 2014 Turkish local elections the new municipality officially took office. Today the city is generally considered to be a notable trade and industrial hub, as well as a cultural centre point thanks to the İnönü University that was established on 28 January 1975.

== Demographics ==
According to German geographers Georg Hassel and Adam Christian Gaspari, Malatya was composed of 1,200 to 1,500 houses in the early 19th century, inhabited by Turks, Armenians, and Greeks. William Harrison Ainsworth visited the city of Malatya in 1837, noting a population of 8,000 Muslims, chiefly Turks, and 3,000 Armenians.

== Climate ==
Malatya has a cold semi-arid climate (Köppen climate classification: BSk) or a temperate continental climate (Trewartha climate classification: Dca), with hot, dry summers and cold, snowy winters.

Highest recorded temperature:42.7 °C (108.9 °F) on 14 August 2019
Lowest recorded temperature:−22.2 °C (−8.0 °F) on 28 December 1953

Climate data for Malatya (1991–2020, extremes 1929–2023)
Month	Jan	Feb	Mar	Apr	May	Jun	Jul	Aug	Sep	Oct	Nov	Dec	Year
Record high °C (°F)	15.4 (59.7)	20.3 (68.5)	27.2 (81.0)	33.7 (92.7)	36.3 (97.3)	40.0 (104.0)	42.5 (108.5)	42.7 (108.9)	39.6 (103.3)	34.4 (93.9)	25.0 (77.0)	18.0 (64.4)	42.7 (108.9)
Mean daily maximum °C (°F)	4.5 (40.1)	6.9 (44.4)	13.0 (55.4)	19.0 (66.2)	24.6 (76.3)	30.6 (87.1)	34.9 (94.8)	34.8 (94.6)	29.8 (85.6)	22.3 (72.1)	12.9 (55.2)	6.0 (42.8)	19.9 (67.8)
Daily mean °C (°F)	0.8 (33.4)	2.4 (36.3)	7.7 (45.9)	13.2 (55.8)	18.2 (64.8)	23.7 (74.7)	27.8 (82.0)	27.8 (82.0)	23.0 (73.4)	16.2 (61.2)	8.0 (46.4)	2.5 (36.5)	14.3 (57.7)
Mean daily minimum °C (°F)	−2.1 (28.2)	−1.3 (29.7)	3.0 (37.4)	7.7 (45.9)	12.2 (54.0)	16.9 (62.4)	20.7 (69.3)	20.9 (69.6)	16.4 (61.5)	10.8 (51.4)	4.0 (39.2)	−0.2 (31.6)	9.1 (48.4)
Record low °C (°F)	−19.5 (−3.1)	−21.2 (−6.2)	−13.9 (7.0)	−6.6 (20.1)	0.1 (32.2)	4.9 (40.8)	10.0 (50.0)	9.3 (48.7)	3.2 (37.8)	−1.2 (29.8)	−12.0 (10.4)	−22.2 (−8.0)	−22.2 (−8.0)
Average precipitation mm (inches)	40.6 (1.60)	41.5 (1.63)	43.3 (1.70)	49.5 (1.95)	45.0 (1.77)	13.6 (0.54)	4.6 (0.18)	3.3 (0.13)	10.8 (0.43)	35.1 (1.38)	37.4 (1.47)	41.1 (1.62)	365.8 (14.40)
Average precipitation days	10.10	10.30	10.67	10.57	10.33	4.80	1.17	1.13	2.40	7.00	7.63	10.20	86.3
Average snowy days	7.3	7.3	2.6	0.1	0.1	0	0	0	0	0.3	0.8	3.5	22
Average relative humidity (%)	72	67.3	58.5	53.4	50	38	30.8	31	36	51.8	64.5	74.8	52.3
Mean monthly sunshine hours	110.5	128.4	184.9	207.3	271.2	327.1	366.0	344.7	302.5	231.4	156.6	91.2	2,715.5
Mean daily sunshine hours	3.6	4.6	6.0	7.0	8.9	10.9	11.8	11.3	10.1	7.5	5.4	3.3	7.5
Source 1: Turkish State Meteorological Service
Source 2: NOAA NCEI(humidity, sun 1991-2020), Meteomanz(snowy days 2002–2012)

== Economy ==
The economy of the city of Malatya is dominated by agriculture, textile manufacturing, and construction. As with the general province, apricot production is important for subsistence in the central district. Malatya is the world leader in apricot production. The city has two organized industrial zones, where the chief industry is textile.

Historically, Malatya produced opium. The British, in 1920, described the opium from Malatya as having "the highest percentage of morphia".

== Culture ==
=== Cuisine ===
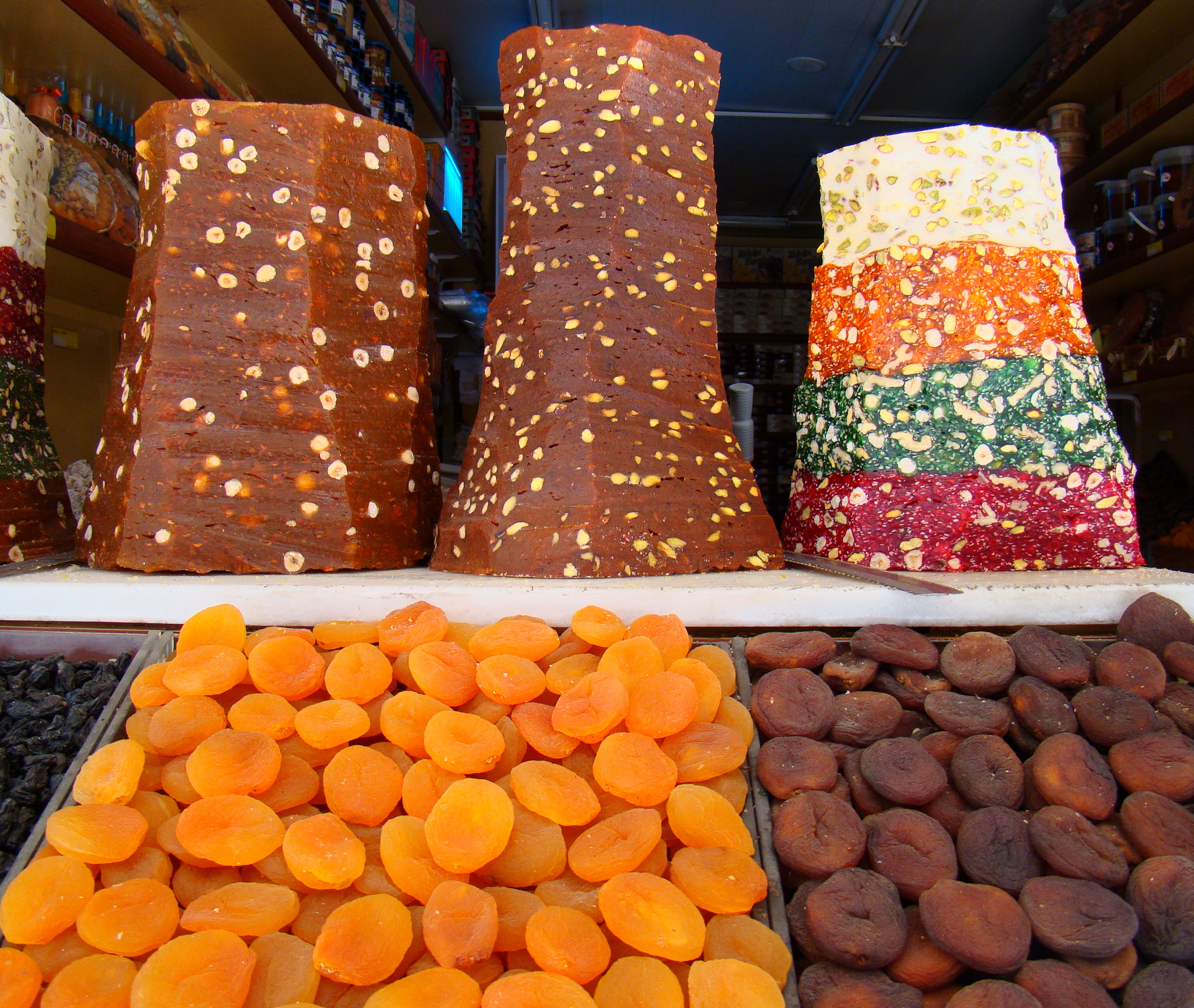
Apricot products in Malatya

Köfte (meatballs) are used in many meals from kebabs (meat broiled or roasted in small pieces) to desserts. There are over 70 kinds of köfte, usually made with wheat and other ingredients. Kağıt kebabı is a local specialty – a dish made of lamb and vegetables broiled in a wrapper, usually oily paper. Other important dishes are a variety of stuffed specialties, including stuffed mulberry leaves, stuffed cherry leaves , cabbage, chard, lettuce wraps with olive oil, vine leaves, cherry leaves, bean leaves, grape leaves, beets, onions, and zucchini flowers.

The Malatya region is known for its apricot orchards. About 50% of the fresh apricot production and 95% of the dried apricot production in Turkey, the world's leading apricot producer, is provided by Malatya. Overall, about 10–15% of the worldwide crop of fresh apricots, and about 65–80% of the worldwide production of dried apricots comes out of Malatya. Malatya apricots are often sun-dried by family-run orchards using traditional methods before export.

=== Festivals ===
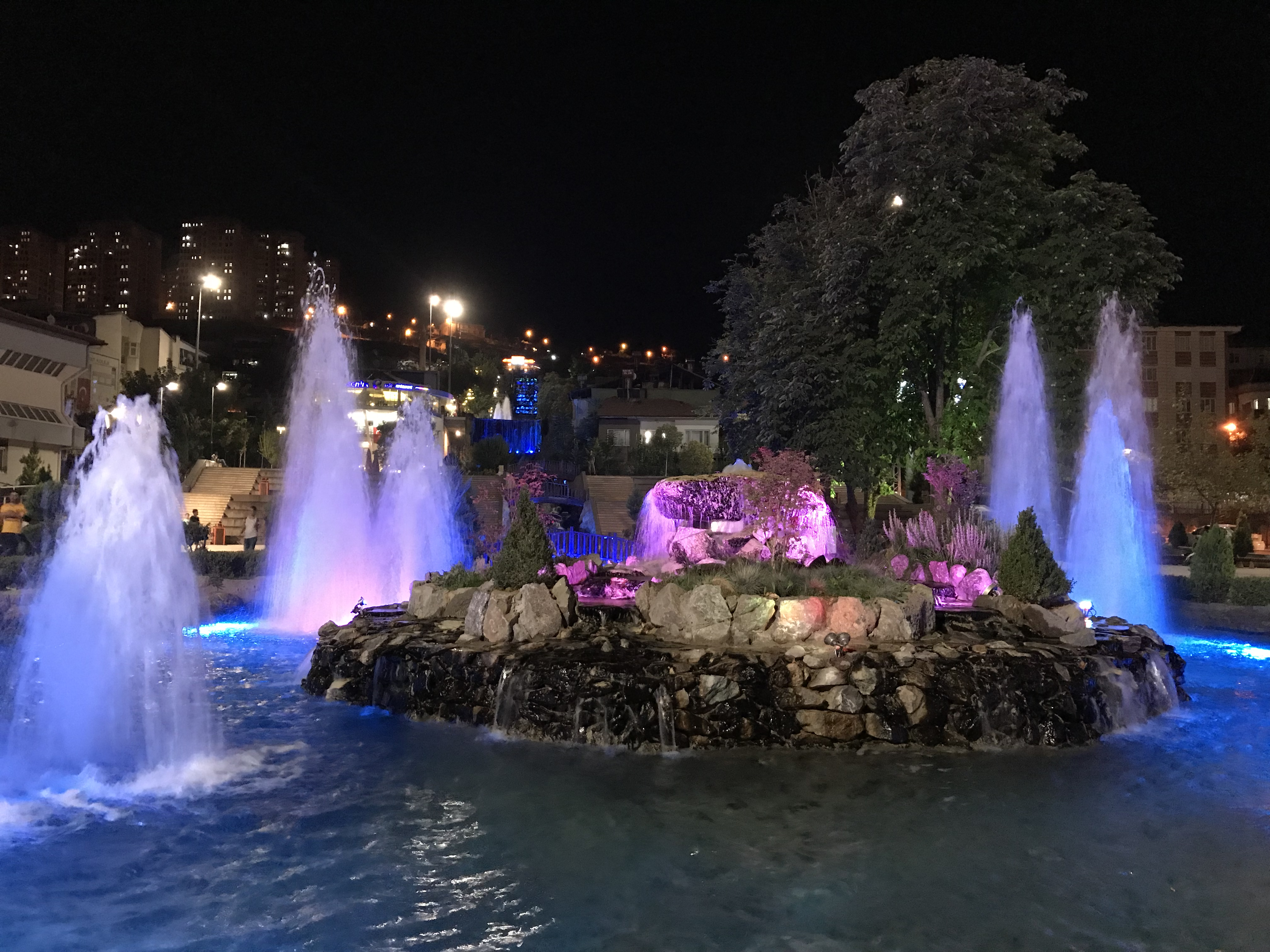
A night view of the fountains at the Park Kernek.

Malatya Fair and Apricot Festivities has been held since 1978, every year in July, to promote Malatya and apricots and to convene the producers to meet one another. During the festivities, sports activities, concerts and apricot contests are organized.

Near the Apricot Festivities, there are other annual activities in summer. Cherry Festivities at Yeşilyurt District of Malatya and Grape Festivities at Arapgir District are organized annually.

=== Sports ===
Malatya's initial team is Malatyaspor whose colors are red and yellow. Malatyaspor competes in Malatya First Amateur League. Malatyaspor plays their home games in Malatya İnönü Stadium in the city's center. Malatya's other team is Yeni Malatyaspor (formerly Malatya Belediyespor) whose colors are black and yellow (formerly green and orange). They compete in TFF 1.Lig .

The 2023-opened Orduzu Sports Complex is a multi-sport venue located in Orduzu neighborhood of Battalgazi district.

== Administration and politics ==
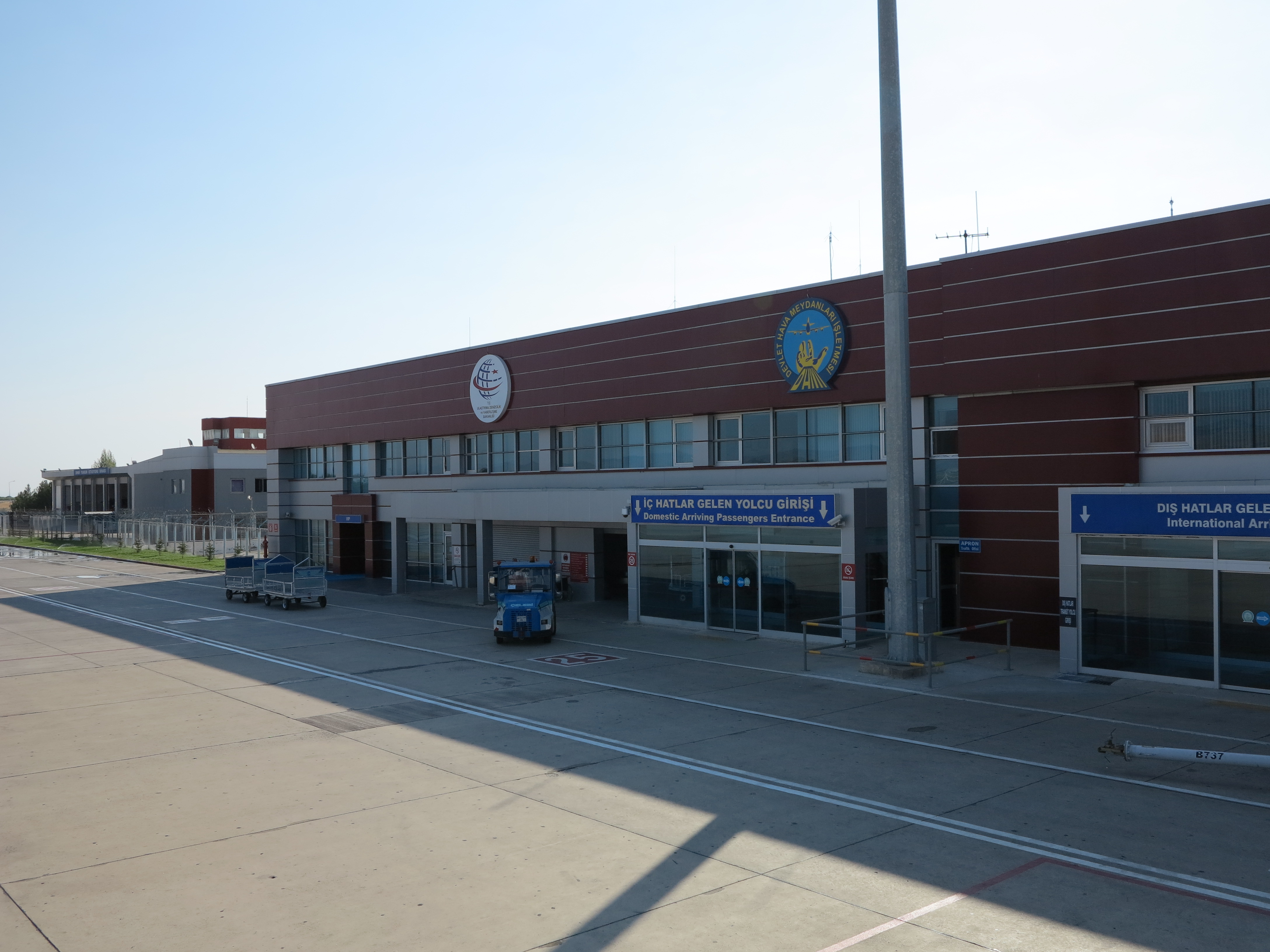
Malatya Erhaç Airport

Malatya is administered by a metropolitan municipality, which covers the whole province. There are two central districts, each with their own municipalities, that make up the city of Malatya: these are Battalgazi and Yeşilyurt. Battalgazi has a population of around 300,000 and covers 47 central neighbourhoods, three rural former municipalities and 28 villages. Yeşilyurt contains 36 central neighborhoods, three rural former municipalities and 16 villages, and has a population of around 250,000. The metropolitan municipality was won in 2014 by Ahmet Çakır of the ruling AK Party with 62.9% of the vote; the candidate of the CHP was in the second place with 16.7% of the vote. Battalgazi was won by Selahattin Gürkan of the AK Party with 63.1% of the vote and Yeşilyurt was won Hacı Uğur Polat of the AK Party with 62.4% of the vote. The two central districts voted overwhelmingly in favour of the AK Party in the June 2015 election with AK Party winning 66.2% of the vote in Battalgazi and 56.9% in Yeşilyurt. These percentages further increased in the November 2015 election to 74.7% and 66.2% respectively. In both elections, CHP had the second place in both districts with its votes remaining in the range of 10–18%.

=== Mayors ===
- 1977–1978 Hamit Fendoğlu Independent
- 1984–1989 Erdem Seyhan Semercioğlu ANAP
- 1989–1999 Ahmet Münir Erkal ANAP, Refah Party, FP
- 1999–2004 Mehmet Yaşar Çerçi MHP
- 2004–2009 Hüseyin Cemal Akın AK Party
- 2009–2018 Ahmet Çakır AK Party
- 2018–2019 Hacı Uğur Polat AK Party
- 2019–2024 Selahattin Gürkan AK Party
- 2024–present Sami Er AK Party

== Education ==
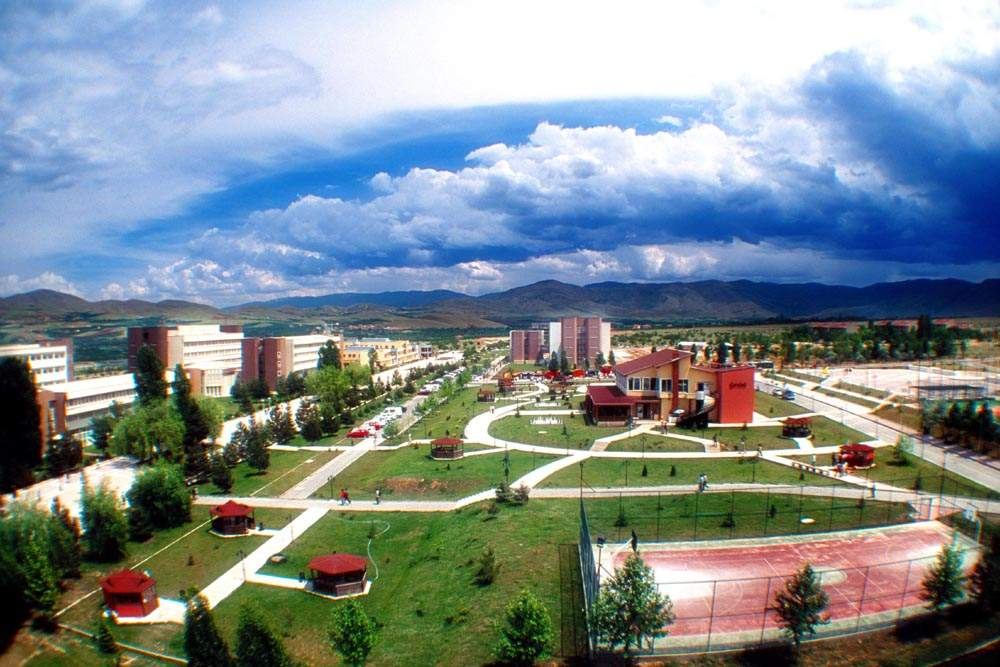
İnönü University Center Campus

İnönü University, one of the largest universities in eastern Turkey, is in Malatya. It was established on 28 January 1975 and has three institutions and nine faculties, with more than 2,500 faculty and 20,000 students. Its larger campus is in the eastern part of Malatya.

Malatya has 162 high schools, and some of the well-known, national high school entrance examination-based high schools in Malatya are Fethi Gemuhluoglu High School of Science, Private Turgut Özal Anatolian High School, Malatya Science High School and Malatya Anatolian High School.

== Landmarks ==
- Great Mosque of Malatya
- New Mosque

== Transport ==
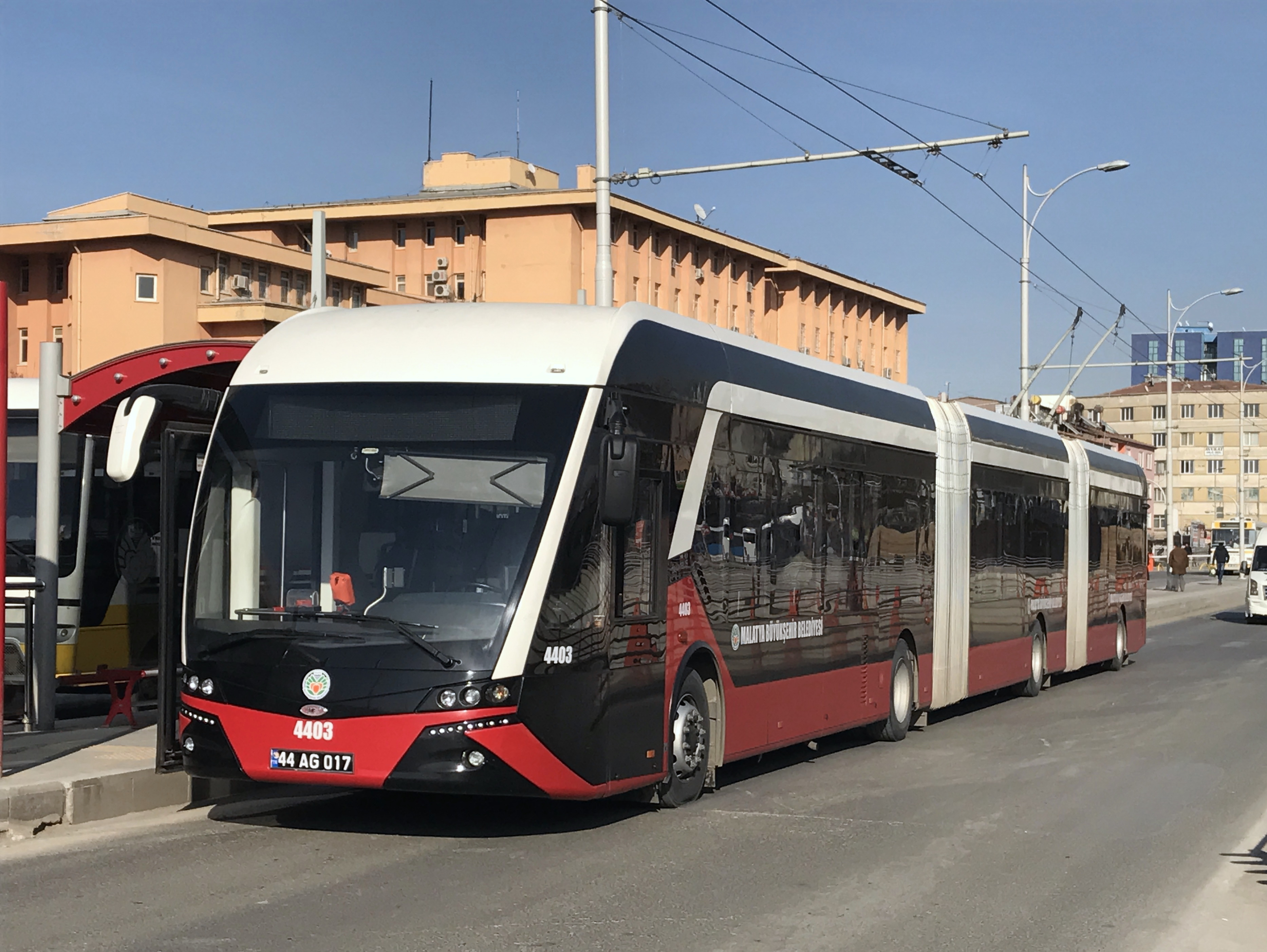
The "Trambus" trolleybus system opened in 2015.

By its relative advance in industrial growth, Malatya is a pole of attraction for its surrounding regions, in commercial and inward immigration. The city is at a key junction in Turkey's road and rail network. By rail, it serves as the junction for Aleppo through Syria–Samsun line. The bus terminal is 5 km (3.1 mi) west of the city center; there are regular intercity services to and from Ankara, Istanbul and Gaziantep. The railway station is 3 km (1.9 mi) west of the city center, and daily express trains run to Elazığ, Diyarbakır, Istanbul and Ankara. These stations are easily reached by taxis and dolmuş services.

Construction of a trolleybus line was under way in 2013, and the line opened in March 2015, operating under the name Trambus. It serves a route that is around 21.5 km (13.4 mi) in length and connects Maşti bus station (Maşti Otogar), in the west, with İnönü University (İnönü Üniversitesi), in the east.

Malatya's airport, Erhaç Airport, is 26 km (16 mi) west of the city center. There are daily domestic flights from Istanbul, Ankara and İzmir. Since 2007 there have been international flights during the summer months. These flights are especially from German cities to Malatya, and most of the passengers are Turkish citizens or their descendants who are living and working in Germany.

== Notable people ==
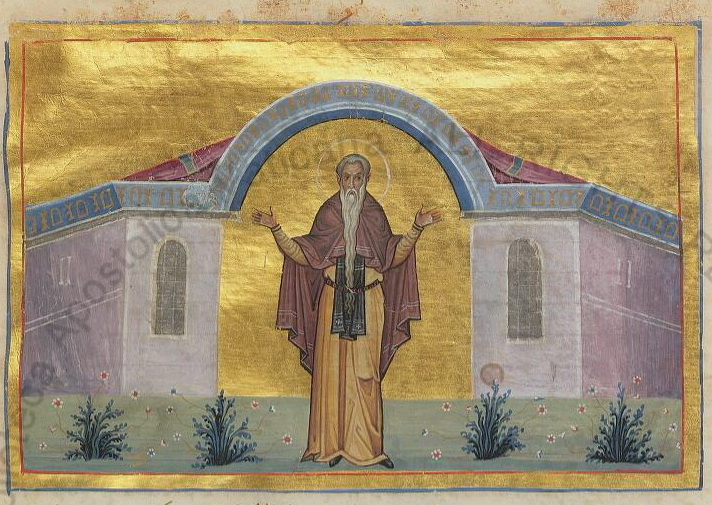
Euthymius the Great as depicted in the Menologion of Basil II

- Euthymius the Great (377–473) – Armenian Christian abbot, hermit and saint
- Battal Gazi (died 740) – Turkish warrior
- Samonas (born c. 875) – Byzantine Arab official
- John VIII bar Abdoun (died 1033) – 67th Syriac Orthodox Patriarch of Antioch
- John X bar Shushan (11th century) –71st Syriac Orthodox Patriarch of Antioch
- Michael the Syrian (1126–1199), 79th Syriac Orthodox Patriarch of Antioch and historian
- Morphia of Melitene (died c. 1127) – Queen of the Kingdom of Jerusalem
- Dionysius bar Salibi (died 1171) – Syriac Orthodox writer and metropolitan bishop of Amid
- Theodoros bar Wahbun (12th century) – Syriac Orthodox monk, writer and anti-Patriarch
- Michael II the Younger (1199–1215) – Syriac Orthodox anti-Patriatch
- Barhebraeus (1226–1286) – Scholar, historian, polymath and maphrian of the Syriac Orthodox Church of Antioch
- Mahmud Nedim Zabcı (1882–1955) – Turkish politician
- Manuel Azadigian (1901–1924) – Armenian-American painter
- Turgut Özal (1927–1993) – Turkish politician, bureaucrat, engineer and statesman
- Hüseyin Cemal Akın (born 1949) – Turkish lawyer and politician
- Bülent Ersoy (born 1952) – Turkish singer and actress
- Hrant Dink (1954–2007) – Turkish-Armenian intellectual, journalist, founder and editor-in-chief of Agos
- Sebouh Chouldjian (1959–2020) – Armenian Apostolic metropolitan bishop of the Diocese of Gougark
- Memet Kiliç (born 1967) – German-Turkish politician
- Murat Göğebakan (1968–2014) – Turkish rock musician and composer
- Bilkay Öney (born 1970) – German-Turkish politician

== Twin towns – sister cities ==
Malatya is twinned with:

- Ganja, Azerbaijan
- Mostar, Bosnia and Herzegovina
- Konya, Turkey
- Bursa, Turkey
