= Ahmet Çakır =

Turkish politician

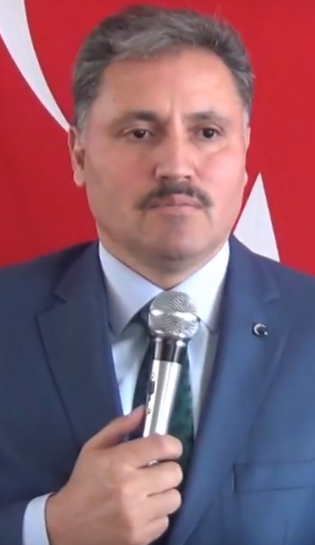

Mayor of Malatya
- In office 29 March 2009 – 26 April 2018
- Preceded by: Hüseyin Cemal Akın
- Succeeded by: Hacı Ugur Polat

Personal details
- Born: 1964 (age 60–61) Malatya, Turkey
- Political party: Justice and Development Party (AK Party)

Ahmet Çakır (born 1964) is a Turkish politician who served as mayor of Malatya from March 2009 to April 2018.

== Early life and career ==
Ahmet Çakır was born in 1964 in Darende district in Malatya, Turkey. Çakır completed his primary, secondary and high school education in Darende. He graduated from faculty of economics at Anadolu University. He was a member of Malatya Independent Industrialists and Businessmen Association (MÜSİAD). Çakır is married and has two children.

== Political career ==
Çakır, along with Recep Tayyip Erdoğan, co-founded the Justice and Development Party (AK Party) on August 14, 2001. In the 2009 regional elections, Çakır ran and won for the post of mayor of Malatya from the AK Party.
