= Hüseyin Cemal Akın =

Turkish politician (born 1949)

Member of Parliament
- Incumbent
- Assumed office 2011

Mayor of Malatya
- In office 28 March 2004 – 29 March 2009
- Preceded by: M. Yaşar Çerçi
- Succeeded by: Ahmet Çakır

Personal details
- Born: 1949 (age 76–77) Malatya or Malatya Province
- Party: AK Party
- Education: Malatya Middleschool; Malatya High School; Ankara University Law Faculty
- Occupation: Politician
- Profession: Lawyer

Hüseyin Cemal Akın (born 1949, Malatya) is a Turkish lawyer, politician, former mayor of Malatya and former Member of Parliament for the AK Party. His mayoral term was from 2004 to 2009.

== Early life and career ==
Hüseyin Cemal Akın was born in Malatya in 1949. He was the son of his father Osman Avni, and mother Çerkez Meliha. He graduated from the Ankara University, Law School and worked for some time as an independent lawyer. He served to terms in the Malatya Baro Presidency.

== Political career ==
He was the deputy to the party leader of the Demokrat Parti and in the 1999 Turkish general election became a candidate for the Demokrat Partis' Malatya MP seat but was not chosen. He joined the AK Parti and worked in the creation of the Malatya II Organisation and in the 2002 Turkish general election became an AK Parti, Member of Parliament candidate.

=== Mayor of Malatya ===
In the 2004 Turkish local elections he became the AK Parti Malatya Municipal Mayor candidate and won the position with %51.461 of the vote. He won despite having little to no name recognition compared to his biggest rival in this election MHP candidate Mehmet Yaşar Çerçi. At this time due to the popularity of the AK Parti and its charismatic leader Tayyip Erdoğan anyone associated with the AKP would win elections as was in Akıns case. His tenure in this position lasted until 29 March 2009.

=== Member of Parliament ===
In the 2011 Turkish general election Akin joined parliament as the AK Parti Malatya MP. He was assigned to the position of the environmental committee at the Grand National Assembly.

== Personal life ==
Akin is fluent in the English language and is married with three children.

In 2012 he was wounded in a traffic accident and taken to the hospital.

Akin became a grandfather in 2013 and had a second grandchild in January 2018.
