= Mahmud Nedim Zabcı =

Turkish politician (1882–1955)

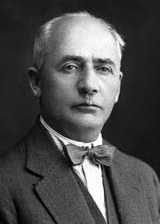

Member of the Grand National Assembly

Personal details
- Born: 1882 Malatya, Ottoman Empire
- Died: 8 February 1955 (aged 72–73) Istanbul, Turkey

Mahmud Nedim Zabcı (1882 – 8 February 1955) was a Turkish educator, economist and politician.
