= Ariobarzanes of Cappadocia =

Ariobarzanes of Cappadocia may refer to:

- Ariobarzanes I of Cappadocia, king of Cappadocia from 93 BC to ca. 63 or 62 BC
- Ariobarzanes II of Cappadocia, son and successor of Ariobarzanes I, murdered some time before 51 BC
- Ariobarzanes III of Cappadocia, son and successor of Ariobarzanes II, who ruled from ca. 51 BC until his execution in 42 BC

== See also ==
- Ariobarzanes (disambiguation)
