= Evangelia Balta =

Greek historian

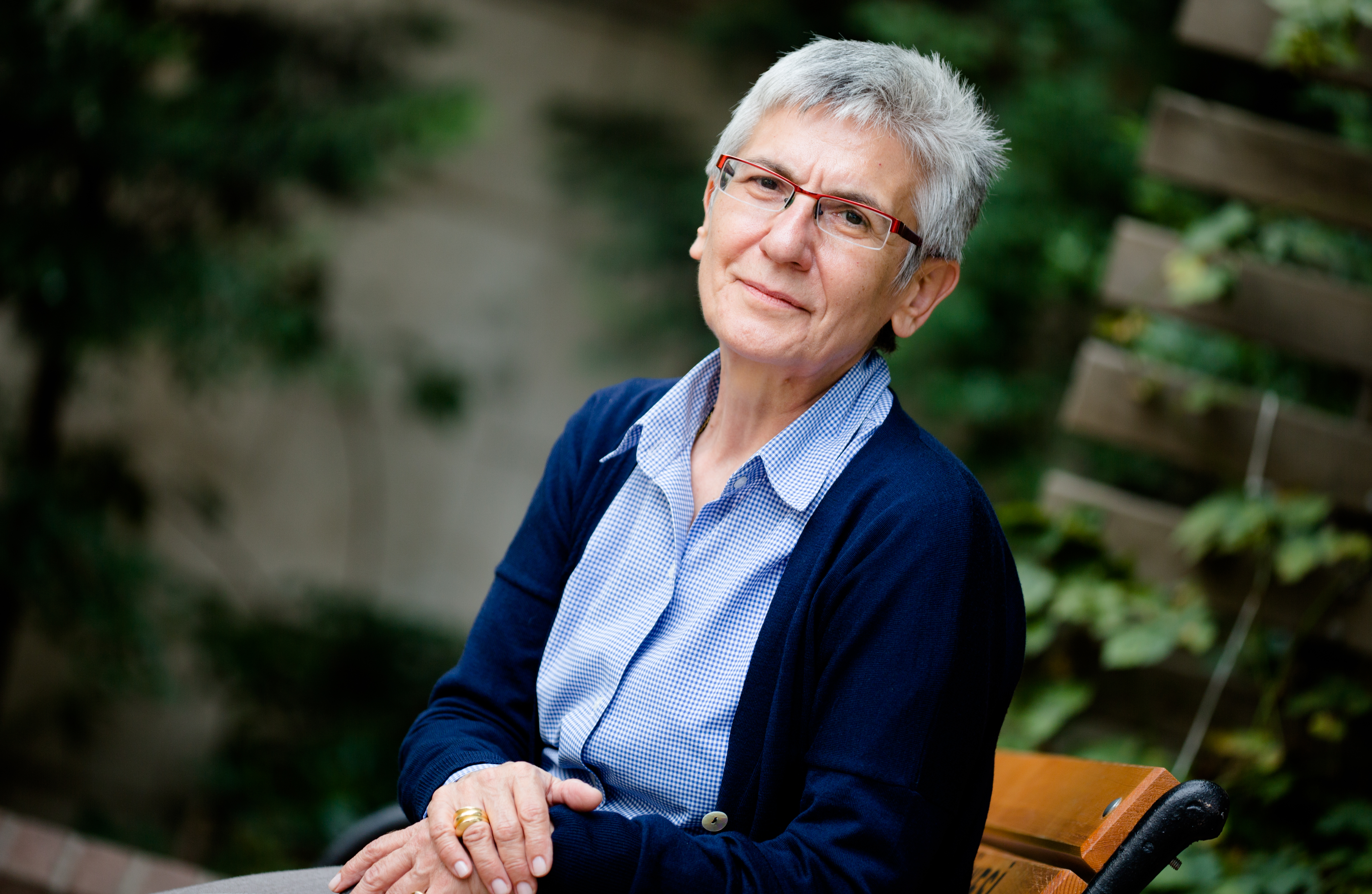
- Evangelia Balta (2016)
- Born: July 24, 1955; Kavala, Kingdom of Greece
- Occupation: Historian
- Awards: Order of Merit of the Republic of Turkey
- Website: evangeliabalta.com

Evangelia Balta (born 24 July 1955, Kavala) is a Greek historian. Her researches focus on Ottoman socio-economic history, Rûm Orthodox culture in Anatolia, and Karamanlidika Studies. She is an honorary member of the Turkish Historical Society and was awarded an Order of Merit of the Republic of Turkey.

Balta was born in Kavala in 1955. She studied at Aristotle University of Thessaloniki in 1973–77 and at Paris I-Sorbonne, Department of Ecole Pratique des Hautes Etudes IV with a scholarship from the Onassis Foundation for her master's and doctoral degrees from 1980-1983. Balta worked at the Historical Archive of Macedonia in 1979 and at the Centre for Asia Minor Studies in 1978 as well as from 1984-1987. She taught at the Ionian University in 1985-1987. Since 1987 she has been a researcher at the National Hellenic Research Foundation (NHRF). She was a member of Koç University's Research Center for Anatolian Civilizations (RCAC) in 2009–2010. In the following years, she organized three international symposia on Karamanlı Turkish, which has been her field of work since 1978. She has organized seminars on the Cunda Islands for Karamanlidika Studies since 2001.

== Works ==
In Turkish

- Karamanlı Yazınsal Mirasının Ocaklarında Madencilik, 2019, Yapı Kredi Yayınları.
- 19. Yüzyıl Osmanlıca ve Karamanlıca Yayınlarda Ezop’un Hayatı ve Masalları (perp.), 2019, Libra Kitap.
- Karamanlıca Kitaplar Çözümlemeli Bibliyografya Cilt I: 1718-1839 (Karamanlıdıka Bibliographie Analytique Tome I: 1718-1839), 2018, Türkiye İş Bankası Kültür Yayınları.
- Gerçi Rum İsek de, Rumca Bilmez Türkçe Söyleriz: Karamanlılar ve Karamanlıca Edebiyat Üzerine Araştırmalar, 2012, Türkiye İş Bankası Kültür Yayınları.
- Ürgüp - Prokopi, 2010, Birzamanlar Yayıncılık.
- Nüfus Mübadelesi, 2010, İnkılap Yayınevi.
- Liva-i Resmo Tahrir Defteri, (with Mustafa Oğuz), 2009, Türk Tarih Kurumu Yayınları.

Other in Turkish

- Epameinondas Kyriakidis, Beyoğlu Sırları (serial novel/1888-1889), Karamanli Turkish:Evangelinos Misailidis, perps.: Evangelia Balta & Sada Payır, İstos, 2020.
- Alexandros Rizos Rangavis, Mukavelat Muharriri: Yunan edebiyatından Türkçeye çevrilmiş ve Karamanlıca yazıyla 1889-1890 yıllarında tefrika edilmiş bir roman, (perps.) Evangelia Balta ve Niki Stavridi, The Isis Press, 2018.
- Stavros Stavridis, Anatol Türküleri: 1896 Osmanlı İmparatorluğu’nda İ̇lk Türkü Mecmuası (perp.) Evangelia Balta ve Ari Çokona, Literatür, 2017

In English

- The Exchange of Populations Historiography and Refugee Memory, 2014, İstos.
- Karamanlidika Studies, 2025, Koç Üniversitesi Yayınları
