= Ottoman Turkish =

Standardized register of Turkish in the Ottoman Empire

- Turki
- لسان عثمانی Lisân-ı Osmânî تركی Türkî / تركجه Türkçe
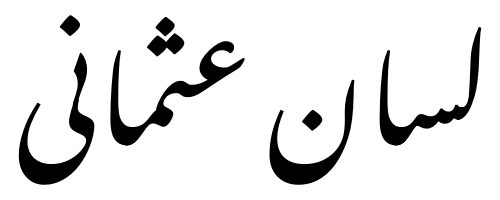
- Ottoman Turkish written in Nastaliq style (لسان عثمانی)
- Region: Ottoman Empire
- Ethnicity: Ottoman Turks
- Era: c. 15th century; displaced as a literary standard by modern Turkish in 1928
- Language family: Turkic: Common Turkic; Oghuz; Western Oghuz; Ottoman Turkish
- Early form: Old Anatolian Turkish
- Writing system: Ottoman Turkish alphabet Armeno-Turkish alphabet

Official status
- Official language in: Beylik of Tunis; Cretan State; Emirate of Jabal Shammar; Khedivate of Egypt; Ottoman Empire; Provisional National Government of the Southwestern Caucasus; Provisional Government of Western Thrace; Turkish Provisional Government; Turkey (until 1928) (Note: The national language was called "Turkish" in the 1921 and 1924 constitutions of the Republic of Turkey.)

Language codes
- ISO 639-2: ota
- ISO 639-3: ota
- Glottolog: otto1234
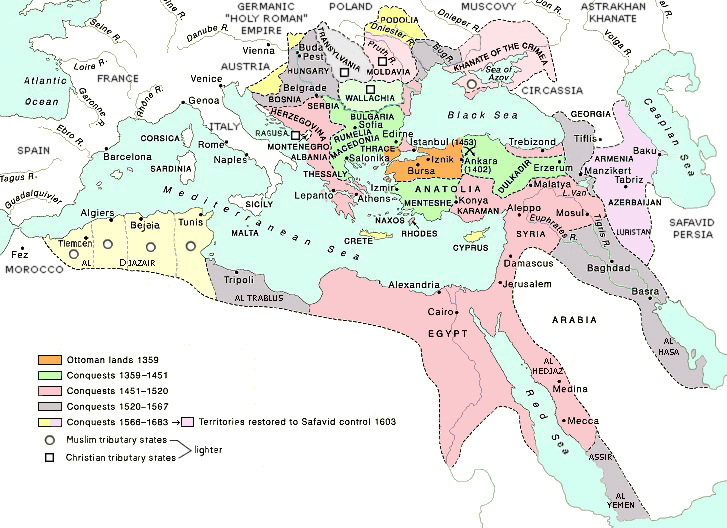
- The Ottoman Empire at its peak. During this time Ottoman Turkish culture including the language also developed in the conquered areas.

Ottoman Turkish (لسان عثمانی, Lisân-ı Osmânî, Turkish pronunciation: [liˈsaːnɯ osˈmaːniː]; Turkish: Osmanlıca; Osmanlı Türkçesi) was the standardized register of the Turkish language in the Ottoman Empire (14th to 20th centuries CE). It borrowed extensively, in all aspects, from Arabic and Persian. It was written in the Ottoman Turkish alphabet. Ottoman Turkish was largely unintelligible to rural Turks, who continued to use kaba Türkçe ("raw/vulgar Turkish"; compare Vulgar Latin and Demotic Greek), which used far fewer foreign loanwords and is the basis of the modern standard.

Terms for the language included lisân-ı Türkî or zebân-ı Türkî ("Turkish language"), or, alternatively during the Ottoman era, lisân-ı Rûm or zebân-ı Rûm ("the language of Rum"). The Tanzimât era (1839–1876) saw the application of the term "Ottoman" when referring to the language (لسان عثمانی lisân-ı Osmânî or عثمانلیجه Osmanlıca). Modern Turkish uses the same terms when referring to the language of that era (Osmanlıca and Osmanlı Türkçesi). More generically, the Turkish language was called تركجه Türkçe or تركی Türkî "Turkish".

== History ==
Historically, Ottoman Turkish was transformed in three eras:

- Eski Osmanlı Türkçesi اسكی عثمانلی توركچه‌سی (Old Ottoman Turkish): the version of Ottoman Turkish used until the 16th century. It was almost identical with the Turkish used by Seljuk empire and Anatolian beyliks and was often regarded as part of Eski Anadolu Türkçesi اسكی آناطولی توركچه‌سی (Old Anatolian Turkish).
- Orta Osmanlı Türkçesi اورتا عثمانلی توركچه‌سی (Middle Ottoman Turkish) or Klasik Osmanlıca (Classical Ottoman Turkish): the language of poetry and administration from the 16th century until Tanzimat.
- Yeni Osmanlı Türkçesi یڭی عثمانلی توركچه‌سی (New Ottoman Turkish): the version shaped from the 1850s to the 20th century under the influence of journalism and Western-oriented literature.

Ottoman Turkish was developed and extensively promoted as an imperial and court language during the reign of Mehmed II, with whose encouragement the language became heavily Persianised.

=== Language reform ===
In 1928, following the fall of the Ottoman Empire after World War I and the establishment of the Republic of Turkey, widespread language reforms (a part in the greater framework of Atatürk's reforms) instituted by Mustafa Kemal Atatürk saw the replacement of many Persian and Arabic origin loanwords in the language with their Turkish equivalents. One of the main supporters of the reform was the Turkish nationalist Ziya Gökalp. It also saw the replacement of the Perso-Arabic script with the extended Latin alphabet. The changes were meant to encourage the growth of a new variety of written Turkish that more closely reflected the spoken vernacular and to foster a new variety of spoken Turkish that reinforced Turkey's new national identity as being a post-Ottoman state.

See the list of replaced loanwords in Turkish for more examples of Ottoman Turkish words and their modern Turkish counterparts. Five examples of Arabic loanwords are found below with their Turkic-derived synonyms, the Arabic loanwords are still used alongside the Turkic words in Modern Turkish.

English	Ottoman	Modern Turkish
duty	وظیفه vazife	görev
positive	مثبت müspet	olumlu
hardship	مشكل müşkül	güçlük
province	ولایت vilâyet	il
war	حرب harp	savaş

== Legacy ==
Historically speaking, Ottoman Turkish is the predecessor of modern Turkish. However, the standard Turkish of today is essentially Türkiye Türkçesi (Turkish of Turkey) as written in the Latin alphabet and with an abundance of neologisms added, which means there are now far fewer loan words from other languages, and Ottoman Turkish was not instantly transformed into the Turkish of today. At first, it was only the script that was changed, and while some households continued to use the Arabic system in private, most of the Turkish population was illiterate at the time, making the switch to the Latin alphabet much easier. Then, loan words were taken out, and new words fitting the growing amount of technology were introduced. Until the 1960s, Ottoman Turkish was at least partially intelligible with the Turkish of that day. One major difference between Ottoman Turkish and modern Turkish is the latter's abandonment of compound word formation according to Arabic and Persian grammar rules. The usage of such phrases still exists in modern Turkish but only to a very limited extent and usually in specialist contexts; for example, the Persian-derived genitive construction تقدیر الهی (takdîr-i ilâhî) (which reads literally as "the preordaining of the divine" and translates as "divine dispensation" or "destiny") is used, as opposed to the normative modern Turkish construction, ilâhî takdîr (literally, "divine preordaining").

In 2014, Turkey's Education Council decided that Ottoman Turkish should be taught in Islamic high schools and as an elective in other schools, a decision backed by President Recep Tayyip Erdoğan, who said the language should be taught in schools so younger generations do not lose touch with their cultural heritage.

== Writing system ==
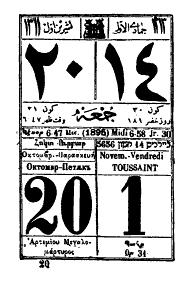
Calendar in Thessaloniki 1896, a cosmopolitan city; the first three lines in Ottoman script

Most Ottoman Turkish was written in the Ottoman Turkish alphabet (Ottoman Turkish: الفبا, romanized: elifbâ), a variant of the Perso-Arabic script. The Armenian, Greek and Rashi script of Hebrew were sometimes used by Armenians, Greeks and Jews. (See Karamanli Turkish, a dialect of Ottoman written in the Greek script; Armeno-Turkish alphabet)

== Grammar ==
The actual grammar of Ottoman Turkish is not different from the grammar of modern Turkish. The focus of this section is on the Ottoman orthography; the conventions surrounding how the orthography interacted and dealt with grammatical morphemes related to conjugations, cases, pronouns, etc.

=== Cases ===
- Nominative and Indefinite accusative/objective: -∅, no suffix. گول göl 'the lake' 'a lake', چوربا çorba 'soup', گیجه gece 'night'; طاوشان گترمش ṭavşan getirmiş 'he/she brought a rabbit'.
- Genitive: suffix ڭ/نڭ –(n)ıñ, –(n)iñ, –(n)uñ, –(n)üñ. پاشانڭ paşanıñ 'of the pasha'; كتابڭ kitabıñ 'of the book'.
- Definite accusative: suffix ی –ı, -i: طاوشانی گترمش ṭavşanı getürmiş 'he/she brought the rabbit'. The variant suffix –u, –ü does not occur in Ottoman Turkish orthography (unlike in Modern Turkish), although it's pronounced with the vowel harmony. Thus, گولی göli 'the lake' vs. Modern Turkish gölü.
- Dative: suffix ه –e: اوه eve 'to the house'.
- Locative: suffix ده –de, –da: مكتبده mektebde 'at school', قفصده ḳafeṣde 'in (the/a) cage', باشده başda 'at a/the start', شهرده şehirde 'in town'. The variant suffix used in Modern Turkish (–te, –ta) does not occur.
- Ablative: suffix دن –den, -dan: ادمدن adamdan 'from the man'.
- Instrumental: suffix or postposition ایله ile. Generally not counted as a grammatical case in modern grammars.

The table below lists nouns with a variety of phonological features that come into play when taking case suffixes; it includes a typical singular and plural noun, containing back and front vowels, words that end with the letter ـه (-a or -e) (back and front vowels), words that end in a ـت (-t) sound, and words that end in either ـق or ـك (-k). These words are to serve as references, to observe orthographic conventions:

- Which vowels are written using the 4 letters: elif ا, vav و, he ه, and ye ی, and which are not.
- When words or morphemes are connected to each other, and when they are separated with the use of Zero-width non-joiner.
- When a final letter is softened when followed by a vowel sound, and when not; both in Ottoman orthography and in modern Latin orthography.
- When harmony of vowel roundness exists in spoken pronunciation and modern Latin orthography, but not in Ottoman orthography.
- When the letters ڭ (ñ) and ن (n) are used.

Declension of nouns for case
Case	Morpheme	اُوق		اُوقلَر		اَو		اَولَر		قورت		چارطاق		ایپك		پاره		پیده		كوپری	
Case	Morpheme	ok 'arrow'		oklar 'arrows'		ev 'house'		evler 'houses'		kurt 'wolf'		çartak 'gazebo'		ipek 'silk'		para 'money'		pide 'pita'		köprü 'bridge'	
Nom	—	اوق	ok	اوقلر	oklar	او	ev	اولر	evler	قورت	kurt	چارطاق	çartak	ایپك	ipek	پاره	para	پیده	pide	كوپری	köprü
Acc	ـی	اوقی	oku	اوقلری	okları	اوی	evi	اولری	evleri	قوردی	kurdu	چارطاغی	çartağı	ایپگی	ipeği	پاره‌یی	parayı	پیده‌یی	pideyi	كوپریی	köprüyü
Acc	-ı -i -u -ü	اوقی	oku	اوقلری	okları	اوی	evi	اولری	evleri	قوردی	kurdu	چارطاغی	çartağı	ایپگی	ipeği	پاره‌یی	parayı	پیده‌یی	pideyi	كوپریی	köprüyü
Dat	ـه	اوقه	oka	اوقلره	oklara	اوه	eve	اولره	evlere	قورده	kurda	چارطاغه	çartağa	ایپگه	ipeğe	پاره‌یه	paraya	پیده‌یه	pideye	كوپریه	köprüye
Dat	-a -e	اوقه	oka	اوقلره	oklara	اوه	eve	اولره	evlere	قورده	kurda	چارطاغه	çartağa	ایپگه	ipeğe	پاره‌یه	paraya	پیده‌یه	pideye	كوپریه	köprüye
Loc	ـده	اوقده	okta	اوقلرده	oklarda	اوده	evde	اولرده	evlerde	قورتده	kurt'ta	چارطاقده	çartakta	ایپكده	ipekte	پاره‌ده	parada	پیده‌ده	pidede	كوپریده	köprüde
Loc	-da -de -ta -te	اوقده	okta	اوقلرده	oklarda	اوده	evde	اولرده	evlerde	قورتده	kurt'ta	چارطاقده	çartakta	ایپكده	ipekte	پاره‌ده	parada	پیده‌ده	pidede	كوپریده	köprüde
Abl	ـدن	اوقدن	oktan	اوقلردن	oklardan	اودن	evden	اولردن	evlerden	قورتدن	kurttan	چارطاقدن	çartaktan	ایپكدن	ipekten	پاره‌دن	paradan	پیده‌دن	pideden	كوپریدن	köprüden
Abl	-dan -den -tan -ten	اوقدن	oktan	اوقلردن	oklardan	اودن	evden	اولردن	evlerden	قورتدن	kurttan	چارطاقدن	çartaktan	ایپكدن	ipekten	پاره‌دن	paradan	پیده‌دن	pideden	كوپریدن	köprüden
Gen	ـڭ	اوقڭ	okun	اوقلرڭ	okların	اوڭ	evin	اولرڭ	evlerin	قوردڭ	kurdun	چارطاغڭ	çartağın	ایپگڭ	ipeğin	پاره‌‌نڭ	paranın	پیده‌‌نڭ	pidenin	كوپرینڭ	köprünün
Gen	-ın -in -un -ün	اوقڭ	okun	اوقلرڭ	okların	اوڭ	evin	اولرڭ	evlerin	قوردڭ	kurdun	چارطاغڭ	çartağın	ایپگڭ	ipeğin	پاره‌‌نڭ	paranın	پیده‌‌نڭ	pidenin	كوپرینڭ	köprünün
Inst	ـله	اوقله	okla	اوقلرله	oklarla	اوله	evle	اولرله	evlerle	قورتله	kurtla	چارطاقله	çartakla	ایپكله	ipekle	پاره‌‌‌یله	parayla	پیده‌‌یله	pideyle	كوپریله	köprüyle
Inst	-la -le -lu -lü	اوقله	okla	اوقلرله	oklarla	اوله	evle	اولرله	evlerle	قورتله	kurtla	چارطاقله	çartakla	ایپكله	ipekle	پاره‌‌‌یله	parayla	پیده‌‌یله	pideyle	كوپریله	köprüyle

=== Possessives ===
Table below shows the suffixes for creating possessed nouns. Each of these possessed nouns, in turn, take case suffixes as shown above.

Declension of nouns for possession
Person	Morpheme	اُوق		اُوقلَر		اَو		اَولَر		قورت		چارطاق		ایپك		پاره		پیده		كوپری	
Person	Morpheme	ok 'arrow'		oklar 'arrows'		ev 'house'		evler 'houses'		kurt 'wolf'		çartak 'gazebo'		ipek 'silk'		para 'money'		pide 'pita'		köprü 'bridge'	
—	—	اوق	ok	اوقلر	oklar	او	ev	اولر	evler	قورت	kurt	چارطاق	çartak	ایپك	ipek	پاره	para	پیده	pide	كوپری	köprü
1st Person Sg.	ـم	اوقم	okum	اوقلرم	oklarım	اویم	evim	اولرم	evlerim	قوردم	kurdum	چارطاغم	çartağım	ایپگم	ipeğim	پاره‌م	param	پیده‌م	pidem	كوپری‌م	köprüm
1st Person Sg.	-m -ım -im -um -üm	اوقم	okum	اوقلرم	oklarım	اویم	evim	اولرم	evlerim	قوردم	kurdum	چارطاغم	çartağım	ایپگم	ipeğim	پاره‌م	param	پیده‌م	pidem	كوپری‌م	köprüm
2nd Person Sg.	ـڭ	اوقڭ	okun	اوقلرڭ	okların	اویڭ	evin	اولرڭ	evlerin	قوردڭ	kurdun	چارطاغڭ	çartağın	ایپگڭ	ipeğin	پاره‌ڭ	paran	پیده‌ڭ	piden	كوپری‌ڭ	köprün
2nd Person Sg.	-n -ın -in -un -ün	اوقڭ	okun	اوقلرڭ	okların	اویڭ	evin	اولرڭ	evlerin	قوردڭ	kurdun	چارطاغڭ	çartağın	ایپگڭ	ipeğin	پاره‌ڭ	paran	پیده‌ڭ	piden	كوپری‌ڭ	köprün
3rd Person Sg.	ـی / ـسی	اوقی	oku	اوقلری	okları	اوی	evi	اولری	evleri	قوردی	kurdu	چارطاغی	çartağı	ایپگی	ipeği	پاره‌سی	parası	پیده‌سی	pidesi	كوپریسی	köprüsü
3rd Person Sg.	-(s)ı -(s)i -(s)u -(s)ü	اوقی	oku	اوقلری	okları	اوی	evi	اولری	evleri	قوردی	kurdu	چارطاغی	çartağı	ایپگی	ipeği	پاره‌سی	parası	پیده‌سی	pidesi	كوپریسی	köprüsü
1st Person Pl.	ـمز	اوقمز	okumuz	اوقلرمز	oklarımız	اومز	evimiz	اولرمز	evlerimiz	قوردمز	kurdumuz	چارطاغمز	çartağımız	ایپگمز	ipeğimiz	پاره‌مز	paramız	پیده‌مز	pidemiz	كوپریمز	köprümüz
1st Person Pl.	-(ı)mız -(i)miz -(u)muz -(ü)müz	اوقمز	okumuz	اوقلرمز	oklarımız	اومز	evimiz	اولرمز	evlerimiz	قوردمز	kurdumuz	چارطاغمز	çartağımız	ایپگمز	ipeğimiz	پاره‌مز	paramız	پیده‌مز	pidemiz	كوپریمز	köprümüz
2nd Person Pl.	ـڭز	اوقڭز	okunuz	اوقلرڭز	oklarınız	اوڭز	eviniz	اولرڭز	evleriniz	قوردڭز	kurdunuz	چارطاغڭز	çartağınız	ایپگڭز	ipeğiniz	پاره‌ڭز	paranız	پیده‌ڭز	pideniz	كوپریڭز	köprünüz
2nd Person Pl.	-(ı)nız -(i)niz -(u)nuz -(ü)nüz	اوقڭز	okunuz	اوقلرڭز	oklarınız	اوڭز	eviniz	اولرڭز	evleriniz	قوردڭز	kurdunuz	چارطاغڭز	çartağınız	ایپگڭز	ipeğiniz	پاره‌ڭز	paranız	پیده‌ڭز	pideniz	كوپریڭز	köprünüz
3rd Person Pl.	ـلری	اوقلری	okları	اوقلرلری	okları	اولری	evleri	اولرلری	evleri	قورتلری	kurtları	چارطاقلری	çartakleri	ایپكلری	ipekleri	پاره‌لری	paraları	پیده‌لری	pideleri	كوپریلری	köprüleri
3rd Person Pl.	-ları -leri	اوقلری	okları	اوقلرلری	okları	اولری	evleri	اولرلری	evleri	قورتلری	kurtları	چارطاقلری	çartakleri	ایپكلری	ipekleri	پاره‌لری	paraları	پیده‌لری	pideleri	كوپریلری	köprüleri

For third person (singular and plural) possessed nouns, that end in a vowel, when it comes to taking case suffixes, a letter ـنـ (-n-) comes after the possessive suffix. For singular endings, the final vowel ـی (-ı or -i) is removed in all instances. For plural endings, if the letter succeeding the additional ـنـ (-n-) is a vowel, the final vowel ـی (-ı or -i) is kept; otherwise it is removed (note the respective examples for kitaplarını and kitaplarından).

	Nom	Acc	Dat	Loc	Abl	Gen
his/her book	كتابی	كتابنی	كتابنه	كتابنده	كتابندن	كتابنڭ
his/her book	kitabı	kitabını	kitabına	kitabında	kitabından	kitabının
his/her books	كتابلری	كتابلرینی	كتابلرینه	كتابلرنده	كتابلرندن	كتابلرینڭ
his/her books	kitapları	kitaplarını	kitaplarına	kitaplarında	kitaplarından	kitaplarının
his/her maternal aunt	تیزه‌سی	تیزه‌‌سنی	تیزه‌‌سنه	تیزه‌‌سنده	تیزه‌‌سندن	تیزه‌‌سنڭ
his/her maternal aunt	teyzesi	teyzesini	teyzesine	teyzesinde	teyzesinden	teyzesinin
his/her maternal aunts	تیزه‌لری	تیزه‌لرینی	تیزه‌لرینه	تیزه‌لرنده	تیزه‌لرندن	تیزه‌لرینڭ
his/her maternal aunts	teyzeleri	teyzelerini	teyzelerine	teyzelerinde	teyzelerinden	teyzelerinin

=== Verbs ===
Below table shows the positive conjugation for two sample verbs آچمق açmak (to open) and سولمك sevilmek (to be loved). The first verb is the active verb, and the other has been modified to form a passive verb. The first contains back vowels, the second front vowels; both containing non-rounded vowels (which also impacts pronunciation and modern Latin orthography).

		Person	آچمق açmak 'to open'				سولمك sevilmek 'to be loved'			
		Person	Singular		Plural		Singular		Plural	
Indicative	Present Imperfect am/is/are opening am/is/are being loved	1	آچیورم	açıyorum	آچیورز	açıyoruz	سولیورم	seviliyorum	سولیورز	seviliyoruz
Indicative	Present Imperfect am/is/are opening am/is/are being loved	2	آچیورسن	açıyorsun	آچیورسڭز	açıyorsunuz	سولیورسن	seviliyorsun	سولیورسڭز	seviliyorsunuz
Indicative	Present Imperfect am/is/are opening am/is/are being loved	3	آچیور	açıyor	آچیورلر	açıyorlar	سولیور	seviliyor	سولیورلر	seviliyorlar
Indicative	Past Imperfect was/were opening was/were being loved	1	آچیوردم	açıyordum	آچیوردق	açıyorduk	سولیوردم	seviliyordum	سولیوردك	seviliyorduk
Indicative	Past Imperfect was/were opening was/were being loved	2	آچیوردڭ	açıyordun	آچیوردڭز	açıyordunuz	سولیوردڭ	seviliyordun	سولیوردڭز	seviliyordunuz
Indicative	Past Imperfect was/were opening was/were being loved	3	آچیوردی	açıyordu	آچیوردیلر	açıyordular	سولیوردی	seviliyordu	سولیوردیلر	seviliyordular
Indicative	Present Aorist shall habitually open shall habitually be loved	1	آچارم	açarım	آچارز	açarız	سولورم	sevilirim	سولورز	seviliriz
Indicative	Present Aorist shall habitually open shall habitually be loved	2	آچارسن	açarsın	آچارسڭز	açarsınız	سولورسن	sevilirsin	سولورسڭز	sevilirsiniz
Indicative	Present Aorist shall habitually open shall habitually be loved	3	آچار	açar	آچارلر	açarlar	سولور	sevilir	سولورلر	sevilirler
Indicative	Past Perfect opened was loved	1	آچدم	açtım	آچدق	açtık	سولدم	sevildim	سولدك	sevildik
Indicative	Past Perfect opened was loved	2	آچدڭ	açtın	آچدڭز	açtınız	سولدڭ	sevildin	سولدڭز	sevildiniz
Indicative	Past Perfect opened was loved	3	آچدی	açtı	آچدیلر	açtılar	سولدی	sevildi	سولدیلر	sevildiler
Indicative	Future will open will be loved	1	آچه‌جغم	açacağım	آچه‌جغز	açacağız	سوله‌جگم	sevileceğim	سوله‌جگز	sevileceğiz
Indicative	Future will open will be loved	2	آچه‌جقسن	açacaksın	آچه‌جقسڭز	açacaksınız	سوله‌جكسن	sevileceksin	سوله‌جكسڭز	sevileceksiniz
Indicative	Future will open will be loved	3	آچه‌جق	açacak	آچه‌جقلر	açacaklar	سوله‌جك	sevilecek	سوله‌جكلر	sevilecekler
Inferential	Perfect have/has opened, I believe was/were loved, I believe	1	آچمشم	açmışım	آچمشز	açmışız	سولمشم	sevilmişim	سولمشز	sevilmişiz
Inferential	Perfect have/has opened, I believe was/were loved, I believe	2	آچمشسن	açmışsın	آچمشسڭز	açmışsınız	سولمشسن	sevilmişsin	سولمشسڭز	sevilmişsiniz
Inferential	Perfect have/has opened, I believe was/were loved, I believe	3	آچمش	açmış	آچمشلر	açmışlar	سولمش	sevilmiş	سولمشلر	sevilmişler
Inferential	Perfect have/has opened, I believe was/were loved, I believe	3	آچمشدر	açmışdır	آچمشلر	açmışlar	سولمشدر	sevilmişdir	سولمشلر	sevilmişler
Necessitative	Aorist must open must be loved	1	آچملویم	açmalıyım	آچملویز	açmalıyız	سولملویم	sevilmeliyim	سولملویز	sevilmeliyiz
Necessitative	Aorist must open must be loved	2	آچملوسن	açmalısın	آچملوسڭز	açmalısınız	سولملوسن	sevilmelisin	سولملوسڭز	sevilmelisiniz
Necessitative	Aorist must open must be loved	3	آچملو	açmalı	آچملولر	açmalılar	سولملو	sevilmeli	سولملولر	sevilmeliler
Necessitative	Past must've open must've been loved	1	آچملویدم	açmalıydım	آچملویدق	açmalıydık	سولملویدم	sevilmeliydim	سولملویدق	sevilmeliydik
Necessitative	Past must've open must've been loved	2	آچملویدڭ	açmalıydın	آچملویدڭز	açmalıydınız	سولملویدڭ	sevilmeliydin	سولملویدڭز	sevilmeliydiniz
Necessitative	Past must've open must've been loved	3	آچملویدی	açmalıydı	آچملویدیلر	açmalıydılar	سولملویدی	sevilmeliydi	سولملویدیلر	sevilmeliydiler
Optative	Present that may open that may be loved	1	آچه‌یم	açayım	آچه‌یز	açayız	سوله‌یم	sevileyim	سوله‌یز	sevileyiz
Optative	Present that may open that may be loved	1	آچه‌یم	açayım	آچه‌لم	açalım	سوله‌یم	sevileyim	سوله‌لم	sevilelim
Optative	Present that may open that may be loved	2	آچه‌سن	açasın	آچه‌سڭز	açasınız	سوله‌سن	sevilesin	سوله‌سڭز	sevilesiniz
Optative	Present that may open that may be loved	3	آچه	aça	آچه‌لر	açalar	سوله	sevile	سوله‌لر	sevileler
Conditional	Aorist if open if be loved	1	آچسم	açsam	آچسق	açsak	سولسم	sevilsem	سولسك	sevilsek
Conditional	Aorist if open if be loved	2	آچسن	açsan	آچسڭز	açsanız	سولسن	sevilsen	سولسڭز	sevilseniz
Conditional	Aorist if open if be loved	3	آچسه	açsa	آچسه‌لر	açsalar	سولسه	sevilse	سولسه‌لر	sevilseler
Conditional	Past if opened if were loved	1	آچسیدم	açsaydım	آچسیدق	açsaydık	سولسیدم	sevilseydim	سولسیدك	sevilseydik
Conditional	Past if opened if were loved	2	آچسیدڭ	açsaydın	آچسیدڭز	açsaydınız	سولسدیڭ	sevilseydin	سولسیدڭز	sevilseydiniz
Conditional	Past if opened if were loved	3	آچسیدی	açsaydı	آچسیدیلر	açsaydılar	سولسیدی	sevilseydi	سولسیدیلر	sevilseydiler
Imperative		1	—		آچالم	açalım	—		سوله‌لم	sevilelim
Imperative		2	آچ	aç	آچڭز	açınız	سول	sevil	سولڭز	seviliniz
Imperative		2	آچڭ	açın	آچڭز	açınız	سولڭ	sevilin	سولڭز	seviliniz
Imperative		3	آچسون	açsın	آچسونلر	açsınlar	سولسون	sevilsin	سولسونلر	sevilsinler

==== Negation and complex verbs ====
Below table shows the conjugation of a negative verb, and a positive complex verb expressing ability. In Turkish, complex verbs can be constructed by adding a variety of suffixes to the base root of a verb. The two verbs are یازممق yazmamaq (not to write) and سوه‌بلمك sevebilmek (to be able to love).

		Person	یازممق yazmamaq 'not to write'				سوه‌بلمك sevebilmek 'to be able to love'			
		Person	Singular		Plural		Singular		Plural	
Indicative	Present Imperfect am/is/are not writing can love	1	یازمیورم	yazmayorum	یازمیورز	yazmayoruz	سوه‌بیلیورم	sevebiliyorum	سوه‌بیلیورز	sevebiliyoruz
Indicative	Present Imperfect am/is/are not writing can love	2	یازمیورسن	yazmayorsun	یازمیورسڭز	yazmayorsunuz	سوه‌بیلیورسن	sevebiliyorsun	سوه‌بیلیورسڭز	sevebiliyorsunuz
Indicative	Present Imperfect am/is/are not writing can love	3	یازمیور	yazmayor	یازمیورلر	yazmayorlar	سوه‌بیلیور	sevebiliyor	سوه‌بیلیورلر	sevebiliyorlar
Indicative	Past Imperfect was/were not writing was/were able to love	1	یازمیوردم	yazmıyordum	یازمیوردق	yazmıyorduk	سوه‌بیلیوردم	sevebiliyordum	سوه‌بیلیوردك	sevebiliyorduk
Indicative	Past Imperfect was/were not writing was/were able to love	2	یازمیوردڭ	yazmıyordun	یازمیوردڭز	yazmıyordunuz	سوه‌بیلیوردڭ	sevebiliyordun	سوه‌بیلیوردڭز	sevebiliyordunuz
Indicative	Past Imperfect was/were not writing was/were able to love	3	یازمیوردی	yazmıyordu	یازمیوردیلر	yazmıyordular	سوه‌بیلیوردی	sevebiliyordu	سوه‌بیلیوردیلر	sevebiliyordular
Indicative	Present Aorist do not write shall be able to love	1	یازمم	yazmam	یازمیز	yazmayız	سوه‌بلورم	sevebilirim	سوه‌بلورز	sevebiliriz
Indicative	Present Aorist do not write shall be able to love	2	یازمازسن	yazmazsın	یازمازسڭز	yazmazsınız	سوه‌بلورسن	sevebilirsin	سوه‌بلورسڭز	sevebilirsiniz
Indicative	Present Aorist do not write shall be able to love	3	یازماز	yazmaz	یازمازلر	yazmazlar	سوه‌بلور	sevebilir	سوه‌بلورلر	sevebilirler
Indicative	Past Perfect used not to write could love	1	یازمادم	yazmadım	یازمادق	yazmadık	سوه‌بلدم	sevebildim	سوه‌بلدك	sevebildik
Indicative	Past Perfect used not to write could love	2	یازمادڭ	yazmadın	یازمادڭز	yazmadınız	سوه‌بلدڭ	sevebildin	سوه‌بلدڭز	sevebildiniz
Indicative	Past Perfect used not to write could love	3	یازمادی	yazmadı	یازمادیلر	yazmadılar	سوه‌بلدی	sevebildi	سوه‌بلدیلر	sevebildiler
Indicative	Future shall not write will be able to love	1	یازمیه‌جغم	yazmayacağım	یازمیه‌جغز	yazmayacağız	سوه‌بله‌جگم	sevibileceğim	سوه‌بله‌جگز	sevibileceğiz
Indicative	Future shall not write will be able to love	2	یازمیه‌جقسن	yazmayacaksın	یازمیه‌جقسڭز	yazmayacaksınız	سوه‌بله‌جكسن	sevibileceksin	سوه‌بله‌جكسڭز	sevibileceksiniz
Indicative	Future shall not write will be able to love	3	یازمیه‌جق	yazmayacak	یازمیه‌جقلر	yazmayacaklar	سوه‌بله‌جك	sevibilecek	سوه‌بله‌جكلر	sevibilecekler
Necessitative	Aorist must open must be loved	1	یازمه‌ملییم	yazmamalıyım	یازمه‌ملییز	yazmamalıyız	سوه‌بلملییم	sevibilmeliyim	سوه‌بلملییز	sevibilmeliyiz
Necessitative	Aorist must open must be loved	2	یازمه‌ملیسن	yazmamalısın	یازمه‌ملیسڭز	yazmamalısınız	سوه‌بلملیسن	sevibilmelisin	سوه‌بلملیسڭز	sevibilmelisiniz
Necessitative	Aorist must open must be loved	3	یازمه‌ملی	yazmamalı	یازمه‌ملیلر	yazmamalılar	سوه‌بلملی	sevibilmeli	سوه‌بلملیلر	sevibilmeliler
Optative	Present that may not open that may not be able to love	1	یازمیه‌یم	yazmayayım	یازمیه‌یز	yazmayayız	سوه‌بله‌یم	sevibileyim	سوه‌بله‌یز	sevibileyiz
Optative	Present that may not open that may not be able to love	1	یازمیه‌یم	yazmayayım	یازمیه‌لم	yazmayalım	سوه‌بله‌یم	sevibileyim	سوه‌بله‌لم	sevibilelim
Optative	Present that may not open that may not be able to love	2	یازمیه‌سن	yazmayasın	یازمیه‌سڭز	yazmayasınız	سوه‌بله‌سن	sevibilesin	سوه‌بله‌سڭز	sevibilesiniz
Optative	Present that may not open that may not be able to love	3	یازمیه	yazmaya	یازمیه‌لر	yazmayalar	سوه‌بله	sevibile	سوه‌بله‌لر	sevibileler
Imperative		1	—		یازمیه‌لم	yazmayalım	—		سوبله‌لم	sevibilelim
Imperative		2	یازمه	yazma	یازمیڭز	yazmayınız	سوبل	sevibil	سوبلڭز	sevibiliniz
Imperative		2	یازمیڭ	yazmayın	یازمیڭز	yazmayınız	سوبلڭ	sevibilin	سوبلڭز	sevibiliniz
Imperative		3	یازمسون	yazmasın	یازمسونلر	yazmasınlar	سوبلسون	sevibilsin	سوبلسونلر	sevibilsinler

==== Compound verbs ====
Another common category of verbs in Turkish (more common in Ottoman Turkish than in modern Turkish), is compound verbs. This consists of adding a Persian or Arabic active or passive participle to a neuter verb, to do (ایتمك etmek) or to become (اولمق olmaq). For example, note the following two verbs:

- راضی اولمق razı olmaq (to consent);
- قتل ایتمك katletmek (to slaughter); تشكر ایتمك teşekkür etmek (to thank);
- ایو اولنمق iyi olunmak (to get better).

Below table shows some sample conjugations of these two verbs. The conjugation of the verb etmek is not straightforward, because the root of the verb ends in a [t]. This sound transforms into a [d] when followed by a vowel sound. This is reflected in conventions of Ottoman orthography as well.

		Person	اولمق olmaq 'to become'				ایتمك etmek 'to do'			
		Person	Singular		Plural		Singular		Plural	
Indicative	Present Imperfect	1	اولیورم	oluyorum	اولیورز	oluyoruz	ایدیورم	ediyorum	ایدیورز	ediyoruz
Indicative	Present Imperfect	2	اولیورسن	oluyorsun	اولیورسڭز	oluyorsunuz	ایدیورسن	ediyorsun	ایدیورسڭز	ediyorsunuz
Indicative	Present Imperfect	3	اولیور	oluyor	اولیورلر	oluyorlar	ایدیور	ediyor	ایدیورلر	ediyorlar
Indicative	Past Imperfect	1	اولیوردم	oluyordum	اولیوردق	oluyorduk	ایدیوردم	ediyordum	ایدیوردق	ediyorduk
Indicative	Past Imperfect	2	اولیوردڭ	oluyordun	اولیوردڭز	oluyordunuz	ایدیوردڭ	ediyordun	ایدیوردڭز	ediyordunuz
Indicative	Past Imperfect	3	اولیوردی	oluyordu	اولیوردیلر	oluyordular	ایدیوردی	ediyordu	ایدیوردیلر	ediyordular
Indicative	Present Aorist	1	اولورم	olurum	اولورز	oluruz	ایدرم	ederim	ایدرز	ederiz
Indicative	Present Aorist	2	اولورسن	olursun	اولورسڭز	olursunuz	ایدرسن	edersin	ایدرسڭز	edersiniz
Indicative	Present Aorist	3	اولور	olur	اولورلر	olurlar	ایدر	eder	ایدرلر	ederler
Indicative	Past Perfect	1	اولدم	oldum	اولدق	olduk	ایتدم	ettim	ایتدك	ettik
Indicative	Past Perfect	2	اولدڭ	oldun	اولدڭز	oldunuz	ایتدڭ	ettin	ایتدڭز	ettiniz
Indicative	Past Perfect	3	اولدی	oldu	اولدیلر	oldular	ایتدی	etti	ایتدیلر	ettiler
Indicative	Future	1	اوله‌جغم	olacağım	اوله‌جغز	olacağız	ایده‌جگم	edeceğim	ایده‌جگز	edeceğiz
Indicative	Future	2	اوله‌جقسن	olacaksın	اوله‌جقسڭز	olacaksınız	ایده‌جكسن	edeceksin	ایده‌جكسڭز	edeceksiniz
Indicative	Future	3	اوله‌جق	olacak	اوله‌جقلر	olacaklar	ایده‌جك	edecek	ایده‌جكلر	edecekler
Necessitative	Aorist	1	اولملویم	olmalıyım	اولملویز	olmalıyız	ایتملییم	etmeliyim	ایتملییز	etmeliyiz
Necessitative	Aorist	2	اولملوسن	olmalısın	اولملوسڭز	olmalısınız	ایتملیسن	etmelisin	ایتملیسڭز	etmelisiniz
Necessitative	Aorist	3	اولملو	olmalı	اولملولر	olmalılar	ایتملی	etmeli	ایتملیلر	etmeliler
Necessitative	Past	1	اولملویدم	olmalıydım	اولملویدق	olmalıydık	ایتملییدم	etmeliydim	ایتملییدق	etmeliydik
Necessitative	Past	2	اوللویدڭ	olmalıydın	اولملویدڭز	olmalıydınız	ایتملییدڭ	etmeliydin	ایتكلییدڭز	etmeliydiniz
Necessitative	Past	3	اولملویدی	olmalıydı	اولملویدیلر	olmalıydılar	ایتملییدی	etmeliydi	ایتملییدیلر	etmeliydiler
Optative	Present	1	اوله‌یم	olayım	اوله‌یز	olayız	ایده‌یم	edeyim	ایده‌یز	edeeyiz
Optative	Present	1	اوله‌یم	olayım	اوله‌لم	olalım	ایده‌یم	edeyim	ایده‌لم	edelim
Optative	Present	2	اوله‌سن	olasın	اوله‌سڭز	olasınız	ایده‌سن	edesin	ایده‌سڭز	edesiniz
Optative	Present	3	اوله	ola	اوله‌لر	olalar	ایده	ede	ایده‌لر	edeler
Imperative		1	—		اوله‌لم	olalım	—		ایده‌لم	edelim
Imperative		2	اول	ol	اولڭز	olunuz	ایت	et	ایدڭز	ediniz
Imperative		2	اولڭ	olun	اولڭز	olunuz	ایدڭ	edin	ایدڭز	ediniz
Imperative		3	اولسون	olsun	اولسونلر	olsunlar	ایتسون	etsin	ایتسونلر	etsinler

==== 'to be' and 'not to be' Verbs ====
In Turkish, there is a verb representing to be, but it is a defective verb. It does not have an infinitive or several other tenses. It is usually a suffix.

		Person	'to be'			
		Person	Singular		Plural	
Indicative	Present	1	ـم	-ım, -im, -um, -üm	ـز	-ız, -iz, -uz, -üz
Indicative	Present	1	ـیم	-yım, -yim, -yum, -yüm	ـیز	-yız, -yiz, -yuz, -yüz
Indicative	Present	2	ـسن	-sın, -sin, -sun, -sün	ـسڭز	-sınız, -siniz, -sunuz, -sünüz
Indicative	Present	3	ـدر	-dır, -dir, -dur, -dür -tır, -tir, -tur, -tür	ـدرلر	-dırlar, -dirler, -durlar, -dürler -tırlar, -tirler, -turlar, -türler
Indicative	Past	1	ـدیم	-dım, -dim, -dum, -düm -tım, -tim, -tum, -tüm	ـدك	-dık, -dik, -duk, -dük -tık, -tik, -tuk, -tük
Indicative	Past	1	ـیدیم	-ydım, -ydim, -ydum, -ydüm	ـیدك	-ydık, -ydik, -yduk, -ydük
Indicative	Past	2	ـدڭ	-dın, -din, -dun, -dün -tın, -tin, -tun, -tün	ـدڭز	-dınız, -diniz, -dunuz, -dünüz -tınız, -tiniz, -tunuz, -tünüz
Indicative	Past	2	ـیدڭ	-ydın, -ydin, -ydun, -ydün	ـیدڭز	-ydınız, -ydiniz, -ydunuz, -ydünüz
Indicative	Past	3	ـدی	-dı, -di, -du, -dü -tı, -ti, -tu, -tü	ـدیلر	-dılar, -diler, -dular, -düler -tılar, -tiler, -tular, -tüler
Indicative	Past	3	ـیدی	-ydı, -ydi, -ydu, -ydü	ـیدیلر	-ydılar, -ydiler, -ydular, -ydüler
Conditional	Aorist	1	ـسم	-sam, -sem	ـسك	-sak, -sek
Conditional	Aorist	1	ـیسم	-ysam, -ysem	ـیسك	-ysak, -ysek
Conditional	Aorist	2	ـسن	-san, -sen	ـسڭز	-sanız, -seniz, -sanuz, -senüz
Conditional	Aorist	2	ـیسن	-ysan, -ysen	ـیسڭز	-ysanız, -yseniz, -ysanuz, -ysenüz
Conditional	Aorist	3	ـسه	-sa, -se	ـسه‌لر	-salar, -seler
Conditional	Aorist	3	ـیسه	-ysa, -yse	ـیسه‌لر	-ysalar, -yseler
Conditional	Past	1	ـسیدم	-saydım, -seydim, -saydum, -seydüm	ـسیدك	-saydık, -seydik, -sayduk, -seydük
Conditional	Past	1	ـیسیدم	-ysaydım, -yseydim, -ysaydum, -yseydüm	ـیسیدك	-ysaydık, -yseydik, -ysayduk, -yseydük
Conditional	Past	2	ـسیدڭ	-saydın, -seydin, -saydun, -seydün	ـسیدڭز	-saydınız, -seydiniz, -saydunuz, -seydünüz
Conditional	Past	2	ـیسیدڭ	-ysaydın, -yseydin, -ysaydun, -yseydün	ـیسیدڭز	-ysaydınız, -yseydiniz, -ysaydunuz, -yseydünüz
Conditional	Past	3	ـسیدی	-saydı, -seydi, -saydu, -seydü	ـسیدیلر	-saydılar, -seydiler, -saydular, -seydüler
Conditional	Past	3	ـیسیدی	-ysaydı, -yseydi, -ysaydu, -yseydü	ـیسیدیلر	-ysaydılar, -yseydiler, -ysaydular, -yseydüler

Negative verb to be is created with the use of the word دگل değil, followed by the appropriate conjugation of the to be verb; or optionally used as a standalone for 3rd person.

- بن ایشجی دگلم / ben işçi değilim: 'I am not a worker'
- او چفتجی دگلدر / o çiftçi değildir: 'he is not a farmer'
- او چفتجی دگل / o çiftçi değil: 'he is not a farmer'
- اگر كندم ایچون حاضر دگلسیدم / eğer kendim için hazır değilseydim.: 'if I'm not ready for myself'

==== 'to exist/have' and 'not to exist/have' Verbs ====
Generally, the verbs 'to exist' and 'to have' are expressed using what's called an existential copula, the word وار var.

- او وار / ev var: 'there is a house'

The verb 'to have' is expressed in the same way, except that the object noun will take a possessive pronoun, producing sentences that will literally mean "there exists house of mine".

- اوم وار / evim var: 'I have a house'

The verbs 'to exist' and 'to have' conjugated for other tenses, are expressed in the same way, with a possessive pronoun if needed, and copula وار var, followed by the 3rd person singular form of the verb 'to do: ایتمك etmek attached as a suffix (or separate as a stanadalone verb); as conjugated in the above section.

- اوڭ واردی / evin vardı: 'you had a house'
- بناء وارملییدی / bina varmalıydı: 'there had to be a building'

The verbs 'not to exist' and 'not to have' are created in the exact same manner and conjugation, except that the copula یوق yok is used.

- او یوق / ev yok: 'there isn't a house'
- اوم یوق / evim yok: 'I don't have a house'
- اوڭ یوقدی / evin yoktu: 'you didn't have a house'
- بناء یوقملییدی / bina yokmalıydı: 'there must not have been a building'

=== Verb construction ===
Turkish being an agglutinative language as opposed to an analytical one (generally), means that from a single root verb, with the addition of a variety of morphemes and suffixes, multiple new and different verbs meanings can be expressed in single but larger words.

Below table is a sample from the verb تپمك (tepmek, "to kick"), whose root (which is also 2nd person imperative) is تپ (tep). Each of the produced new verbs below can be made into an infinitive with the addition of ـمك (-mek) at the end.

Classes		Active		
Classes		Transitive or Intransitive	Transitive or Intransitive	Intransitive
Classes		Determinate	Indeterminate	Reciprocal
Affirmative	Simple	تپ (tep) kick	تپن (tepin) kick about, dance	تپش (tepiş) mutually kick one another
Affirmative	Causative (Permissive)	تپدر (teptir) make/let s.o. kick/be kicked	تپندر (tepindir) make s.o. kick about	تپشدر (tepiştir) make s.o.s kick one another mutually
Negative	Simple	تپمه (tepme) don't kick	تپنمه (tepinme) don't kick about, don't dance	تپشمه (tepişme) don't mutually kick one another
Negative	Causative (Permissive)	تپدرمه (teptirme) make/let not s.o. kick/be kicked	تپندرمه (tepindirme) make not s.o. kick about	تپشدرمه (tepiştirme) make not s.o.s kick one another mutually
Impotential	Simple	تپه‌مه (tepeme) be unable to kick	تپنه‌مه (tepineme) be unable to kick about, dance	تپشه‌مه (tepişeme) be unable to mutually kick one another
Impotential	Causative (Permissive)	تپدره‌مه (teptireme) be unable to make/let s.o. kick/be kicked	تپندره‌مه (tepindireme) be unable to make s.o. kick about	تپشدره‌مه (tepiştireme) be unable to make s.o.s kick one another mutually
Classes		Passive		
Classes		Transitive or Intransitive	Transitive or Intransitive	Intransitive
Classes		Determinate	Indeterminate	Reciprocal
Affirmative	Simple	تپل (tepil) be kicked	تپنل (tepinil) be kicked about	تپشل (tepişil) be mutually kick in
Affirmative	Causative (Permissive)	تپدرل (teptiril) be made to be kicked	تپندرل (tepindiril) be made to be kicked about	تپشدرل (tepiştiril) be made to kick one another mutually
Negative	Simple	تپلمه (tepilme) not be kicked	تپنلمه (tepinilme) not be kicked about	تپشلمه (tepişilme) not be mutually kicked
Negative	Causative (Permissive)	تپدرلمه (teptirilme) be not made to be kicked	تپندرلمه (tepindirilme) be not made to be kicked about	تپشدرلمه (tepiştirilme) be not made to be one another mutually kicked
Impotential	Simple	تپله‌مه (tepilme) be unable to be kicked	تپنله‌مه (tepinileme) be unable to be kicked about	تپشله‌مه (tepişileme) be unable to be mutually kicked
Impotential	Causative (Permissive)	تپدرله‌مه (teptirileme) be unable to be made to be kicked	تپندرله‌مه (tepindirileme) be unable to be made to be kicked about	تپشدرله‌مه (tepiştirileme) be unable to be made to be mutually kicked

== Structure ==
Redhouse's Turkish Dictionary, Second Edition (1880)

Ottoman Turkish was highly influenced by Arabic and Persian. Arabic and Persian words in the language accounted for up to 88% of its vocabulary. As in most other Turkic and foreign languages of Islamic communities, the Arabic borrowings were borrowed through Persian, not through direct exposure of Ottoman Turkish to Arabic, a fact that is evidenced by the typically Persian phonological mutation of the words of Arabic origin.

The conservation of archaic phonological features of the Arabic borrowings furthermore suggests that Arabic-incorporated Persian was absorbed into pre-Ottoman Turkic at an early stage, when the speakers were still located to the north-east of Persia, prior to the westward migration of the Islamic Turkic tribes. An additional argument for this is that Ottoman Turkish shares the Persian character of its Arabic borrowings with other Turkic languages that had even less interaction with Arabic, such as Tatar, Bashkir, and Uyghur. From the early ages of the Ottoman Empire, borrowings from Arabic and Persian were so abundant that original Turkish words were hard to find. In Ottoman, one may find whole passages in Arabic and Persian incorporated into the text. It was however not only extensive loaning of words, but along with them much of the grammatical systems of Persian and Arabic.

In a social and pragmatic sense, there were (at least) three variants of Ottoman Turkish:

- Fasih Türkçe فصیح تركجه (Eloquent Turkish): the language of poetry and administration, Ottoman Turkish in its strict sense;
- Orta Türkçe اورتا تركجه (Middle Turkish): the language of higher classes and trade;
- Kaba Türkçe قبا تركجه (Rough Turkish): the language of lower classes.

A person would use each of the varieties above for different purposes, with the fasih variant being the most heavily suffused with Arabic and Persian words and kaba the least. For example, a scribe would use the Arabic asel (عسل) to refer to honey when writing a document but would use the native Turkish word bal (بال) when buying it.

== Numbers ==
Cardinal numbers
0	٠	صفر	sıfır
1	١	بر	bir
2	٢	ایكی	iki
3	٣	اوچ	üç
4	٤	درت	dört
5	٥	بش	beş
6	٦	آلتی	altı
7	٧	یدی	yedi
8	٨	سكز	sekiz
9	٩	طقوز	dokuz
10	١٠	اون	on
11	١١	اون بر	on bir
12	١٢	اون ایكی	on iki

== Transliterations ==
The transliteration system of the İslâm Ansiklopedisi has become a de facto standard in Oriental studies for the transliteration of Ottoman Turkish texts. In transcription, the New Redhouse, Karl Steuerwald, and Ferit Devellioğlu dictionaries have become standard. Another transliteration system is the Deutsche Morgenländische Gesellschaft (DMG), which provides a transliteration system for any Turkic language written in Arabic script. There are few differences between the İA and the DMG systems.

İA-Transliteration
ا	ب	پ	ت	ث	ج	چ	ح	خ	د	ذ	ر	ز	ژ	س	ش	ص	ض	ط	ظ	ع	غ	ف	ق	ك	گ	ڭ	ل	م	ن	و	ه	ی
ʾ, ā	b	p	t	s̱	c	ç	ḥ	ḫ	d	ẕ	r	z	j	s	ş	ṣ	ż	ṭ	ẓ	ʿ	ġ	f	ḳ	k, g, ñ, ğ	g	ñ	l	m	n	v	h	y

== See also ==
- Old Anatolian Turkish language
- Culture of the Ottoman Empire
- List of Persian loanwords in Turkish
