= Pro-Iranism =

Pro-Iranism may refer to:

- Iranian nationalism, nationalism among the people of Iran and individuals whose national identity is Iranian
- Pan-Iranism, ideology that advocates solidarity and reunification of Iranian peoples
- Persophilia, appreciation or interest in Iranian culture, people or history
