= Karamanli Turkish =

Greek-written Turkish dialect of the Karamanlides

Karamanlı Turkish
- Karamanlıca - Karamanlı Türkçesi
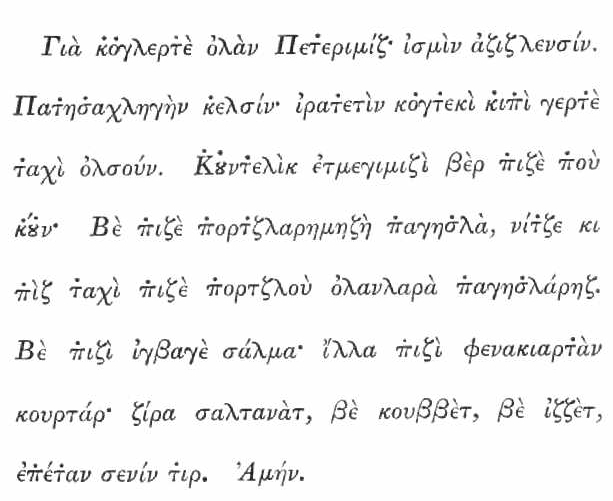
- The Lord's Prayer in Karamanli
- Native to: Greece, Bulgaria, North Macedonia, Turkey
- Ethnicity: Karamanlides
- Era: 19th century
- Language family: Turkic: Common Turkic; Oghuz; Western Oghuz; Turkish; Anatolian; Western Anatolian; Konya–Mersin group; Karamanlı Turkish
- Writing system: Greek

Language codes
- ISO 639-3: –
- Glottolog: kara1469

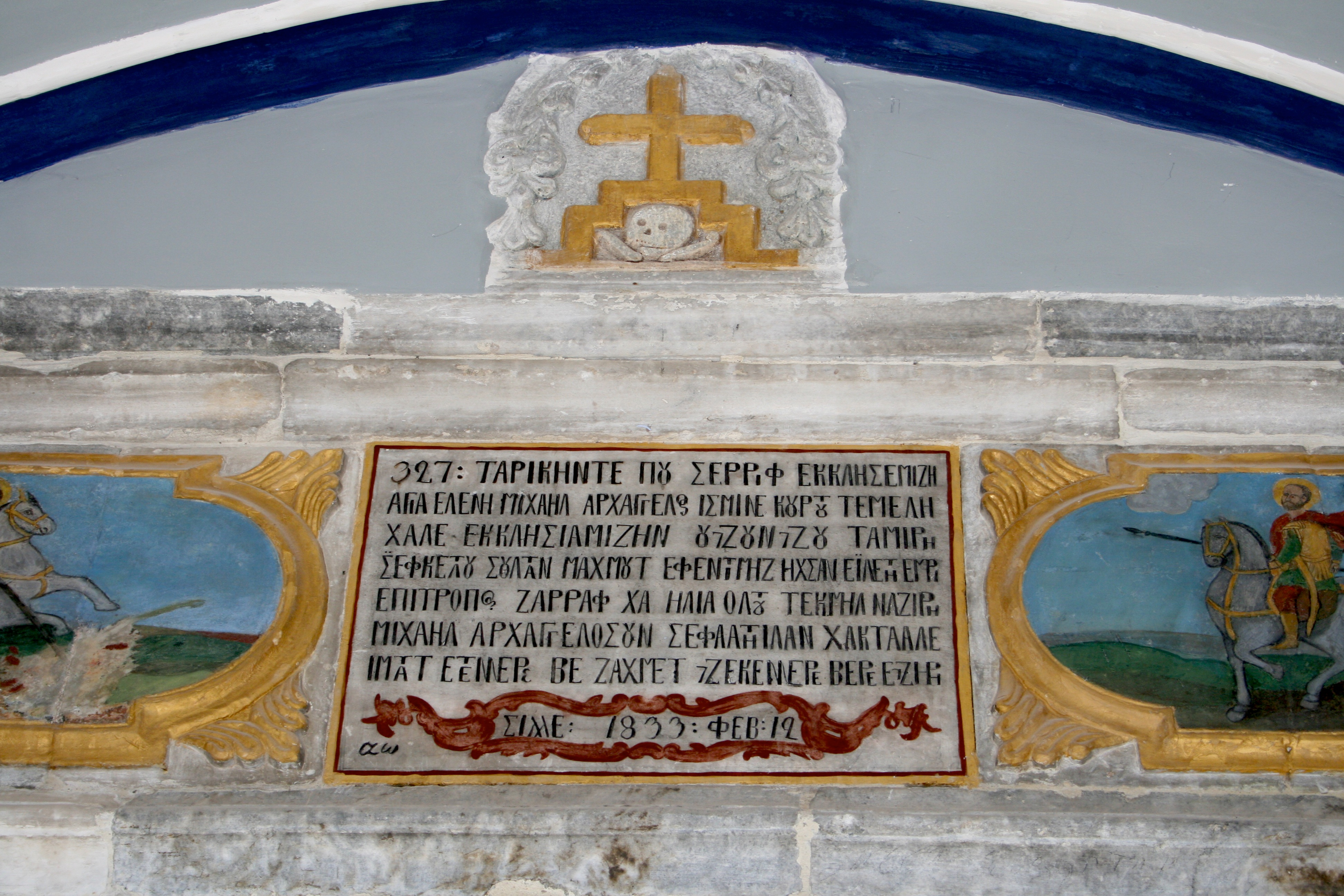
An inscription in Karamanlı Turkish on the entrance of the former Greek Orthodox church of Agia Eleni in Sille, near Konya.

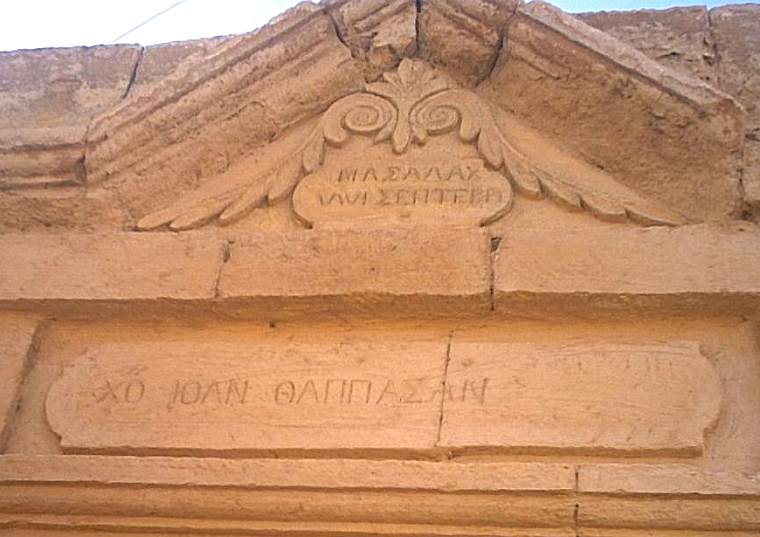
Karamanlidika inscription found on the door of a house in İncesu, Turkeyˈ

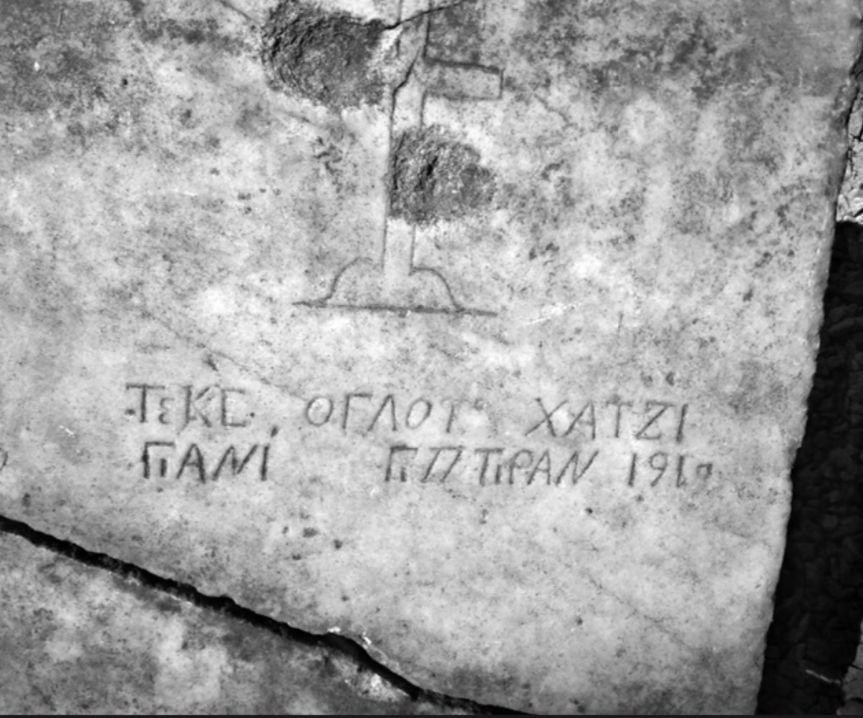
An inscription in Karamanli Turkish found on a tombstone in Elmalık, Yalova Province; it says ΤΕΚΕ ΟΓΛΟΥ ΧΑΤΖΙ ΓΙΑΝΙ ΓΙΠΤΙΡΑΝ 1910 'commissioned by Tekeoglou (or son of Teke) Hatzi Yani in 1910'.

Karamanli Turkish (Turkish: Karamanlı Türkçesi; Greek: Καραμανλήδικα, romanized: Karamanlídika) is an extinct dialect of the Turkish language spoken by the Karamanlides. Although the official Ottoman Turkish was written in the Arabic script, the Karamanlides used the Greek alphabet to write their form of Turkish. Karamanli Turkish had its own literary tradition and produced numerous published works in print during the 19th century, some of them published by the British and Foreign Bible Society as well as by Evangelinos Misailidis in the Anatoli or Misailidis publishing house.

Karamanli writers and speakers were expelled from Turkey as part of the Greek-Turkish population exchange in 1923. Some speakers preserved their language in the diaspora. The written form stopped being used immediately after Turkey adopted the Latin alphabet.

A fragment of a manuscript written in Karamanli was also found in the Cairo Geniza.

== Orthography ==
The Karamanli Turkish alphabet
Greek letter	Latin equivalent	Pronunciation
Α	a	[a]
Π̇	b	[b]
ΔΖ/ṪΖ	c	[d͡ʒ]
ΤΖ	ç	[t͡ʃ]
Δ/Ṫ	d	[d]
Ε	e	[e]
Φ	f	[f]
Γ	g	[g]
Κ̇	g (before e, i, ö, ü)	[ɟ]
Γ/ΓΧ	ğ	[-/j]
Χ	h	[h]
Ι/Η	ı	[ɯ]
Ι	i	[i]
Κ/Ξ/ΧẊ	k	[k/c]
Λ	l	[l]
Μ	m	[m]
Ν	n	[n]
Ο	o	[o]
Ȯ/ΙΟ/Ω	ö	[ø]
Π	p	[p]
Ρ	r	[r]
Σ/Ξ	s	[s]
Σ̇	ş	[ʃ]
Τ/Θ	t	[t]
ΟΥ	u	[u]
Ο̇Υ	ü	[y]
Β	v	[v]
Γ	y	[j]
Ζ	z	[z]

== Media ==
There was a Karamanli Turkish newspaper, Anatoli, published from 1850 to 1922, made by Evangelinos Misailidis. Other publications in Karamanli were Anatol Ahteri, Angeliaforos, Angeliaforos coçuklar içun, Şafak, and Terakki. The second and third were created by the American Board of Commissioners for Foreign Missions. Demetrius Nicolaides also applied to make his own Karamanli publication, Asya ("Asia"), but was denied; he instead made an Ottoman Turkish newspaper called Servet. Evangelina Baltia and Ayșe Kavak, authors of "Publisher of the newspaper Konstantinoupolis for half a century," wrote that they could find no information explaining why Nicolaides' proposal was turned down.

=== Works and translations in Karamanli Turkish ===
==== Books and translations ====
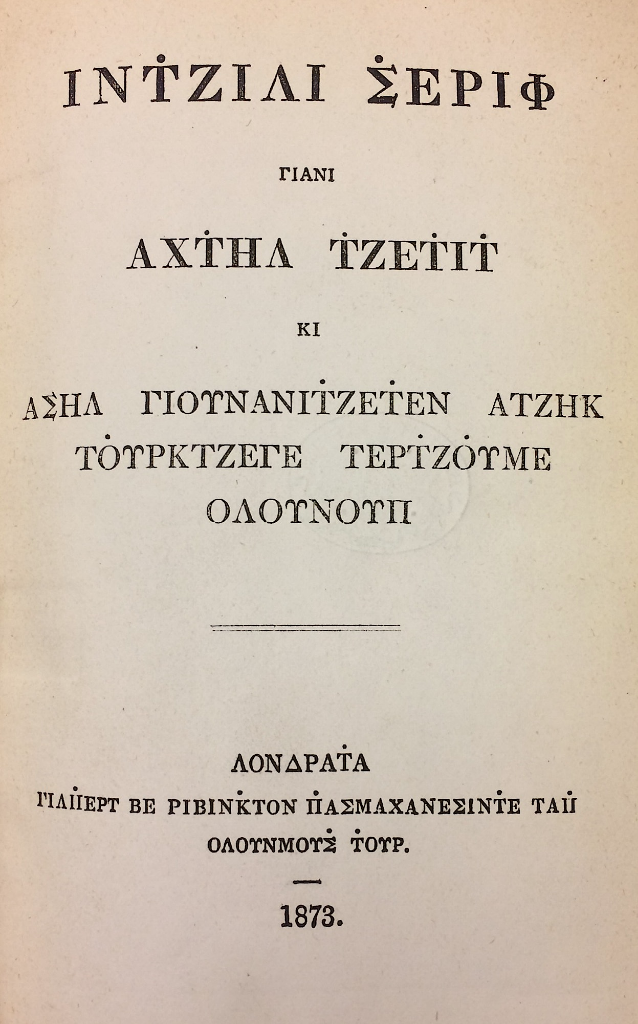
The New Testament in Karamanli Turkish.

Up to 500 works of literature are thought to have been printed in Karamanli. One of the largest distributors of these works was the British and Foreign Bible Society which published numerous editions of the Old Testament and the New Testament. A Karamanli author named Anastasios Karakioulaphis translated Aristotle's Physiognomica from Greek to Karamanli. Other translations include Confucius' works and Xavier de Montepin's novels. A great deal of books and works in the Karamanli dialect are preserved in the Centre of Asia Minor Studies in Athens, Greece.

==== Inscriptions ====
Karamanli inscriptions have been found in many cemeteries in Turkey, most of them in Balıklı. Many of these inscriptions often talk about the humble origins of unimportant craftsmen from central Anatolia. According to historian Richard Clogg, these inscriptions offer a "glimpse of a long past world of Greek and Turkish symbiosis".

== Sample text ==
"Kamayim vurdum yere" is a folk dance belonging to the Karamanlides & Turkish-speaking Cappadocian Greeks.

Lyrics	Transliteration
Καμαΐμ βουρντούμ γερέ	Kamayim vurdum yere
Κανληνήμ ντόλτου ντερέ	Kanlınım doldu dere
Αχ μεντίλ μεντίλ μεντίλ	Ah mendil mendil mendil
Γκάλντηρ κολλάρην μεντίλ	Galdır kolların mendil
Χεπ σιοζλέρνιν μπιρ γιαλάντηρ	Hep sözlerin bir yalandır
Γκιρ κογιουνουμά ινάντηρ	Gir koyunuma inandır
Τσαγρήν ανάν μη γκέλσιν;	Çağrın anan mı gelsin?
Μπενίμ ακράμπαμ νερέ;	Benim akrabam nere?
Καμά τσεκέριμ καμά	Kama çekerim kama
Μπιρ κηζ βερίν αρκαμά	Bir kız verin arkama
Μπιρ κηζ μπανά τσοκ μουντούρ	Bir kız bana çok mudur
Μα λενιζντέ γιοκ μου ντούρ;	Ma'lenızde yök mu dur?

== See also ==
- Armeno-Turkish alphabet
- Ottoman Turkish alphabet
- Tsalka language
- Urum language

== Sources ==
- Evangelia Balta, Karamanlı Yazınsal Mirasının Ocaklarında Madencilik, 2019, Yapı Kredi Yayınları. (in Turkish)
- —, 19. Yüzyıl Osmanlıca ve Karamanlıca Yayınlarda Ezop’un Hayatı ve Masalları (prep.), 2019, Libra Kitap.
- —, Karamanlıca Kitaplar Çözümlemeli Bibliyografya Cilt I: 1718-1839 (Karamanlıdıka Bibliographie Analytique Tome I: 1718-1839), 2018, Türkiye İş Bankası Kültür Yayınları.
- —, Gerçi Rum İsek de, Rumca Bilmez Türkçe Sözleriz: Karamanlılar ve Karamanlıca Edebiyat Üzerine Araştırmalar, 2012, Türkiye İş Bankası Kültür Yayınları.
