= Hurûf-ı munfasıla =

Writing system created by Enver Pasha

- Script type: Alphabet
- Creator: Enver Pasha
- Period: 1917–1918
- Languages: Ottoman Turkish

Related scripts
- Parent systems: Egyptian hieroglyphs: Proto-Sinaitic; Phoenician; Aramaic; Syriac; Nabataean; Arabic; Persian; Ottoman Turkish; Hurûf-ı munfasıla

Hurûf-ı munfasıla (Ottoman Turkish: حروف منفصله, lit. 'separate letters', also hatt-ı cedîd, hatt-ı Enverî, Enver script, Enveriye, army alphabet or German script) is an Ottoman Turkish writing system created by Enver Pasha. Based on the Arabic script, the system was created to simplify the spelling of Ottoman Turkish by more closely approximating its phonetic structure.

In contrast with the impure abjad system of Arabic used in the Ottoman Turkish alphabet, hurûf-ı munfasıla ascribes distinct symbols to each vowel. The writing system also discards the initial, medial, and final letter forms of the Ottoman Turkish alphabet, with only the isolated form of each letter being used. The system consists of a total of 45 characters, including 35 consonants and 10 vowels.

Enver Pasha prepared a book called Elifbâ (lit. 'alphabet') to teach this system in 1917. It is unknown whether the script was officially ended or abandoned.

In his autobiography, Ruşen Eşref Ünaydın conveyed the opinion of Mustafa Kemal Atatürk, who would later instate the reform of the Turkish alphabet, on this system in 1918 as follows:

This work, although done with good intentions, was done haphazardly and at an inappropriate time... Is the time of war a time to deal with letters? For what purpose? To facilitate communication? Hasn't this system made communication slower and more difficult compared to the old system? At a time when speed is crucial, what is the advantage of an endeavor that slows things down and confuses people's minds? But since you have started something, at least have the courage to do it properly.

== See Also ==
- Unified Arabic
