= Turkish alphabet reform =

Conversion of Turkish to Latin script alphabet

The Turkish alphabet reform (Turkish: Harf Devrimi or Harf İnkılâbı) was the process of adopting and applying a new alphabet in Turkey, which occurred with the enactment of Law No. 1353 on "Acceptance and Application of Turkish Letters" on 1 November 1928. The law was published in the Official Gazette on 3 November 1928, and came into effect on that day. With the approval of this law, the validity of the Ottoman Turkish alphabet, which was based on the Arabic script, came to an end, and the modern Turkish alphabet based on the Latin script was introduced.

The Turkish alphabet differs somewhat from the alphabets used in other languages that use the Latin script. It includes letters modified to represent the sounds of the Turkish language (e.g., Ç, Ö, Ü), including some unused in other languages (Ş, Ğ, contrasting dotted and undotted İ / I). The pronunciation of some letters in the Turkish alphabet also differs from the pronunciation of said letters in most other languages using the Latin alphabet. For example, the pronunciation of the letter C in the Turkish alphabet is /d͡ʒ/, the equivalent of J in English, whereas in the English alphabet, it represents the /k/ or /s/ sound.

== History ==
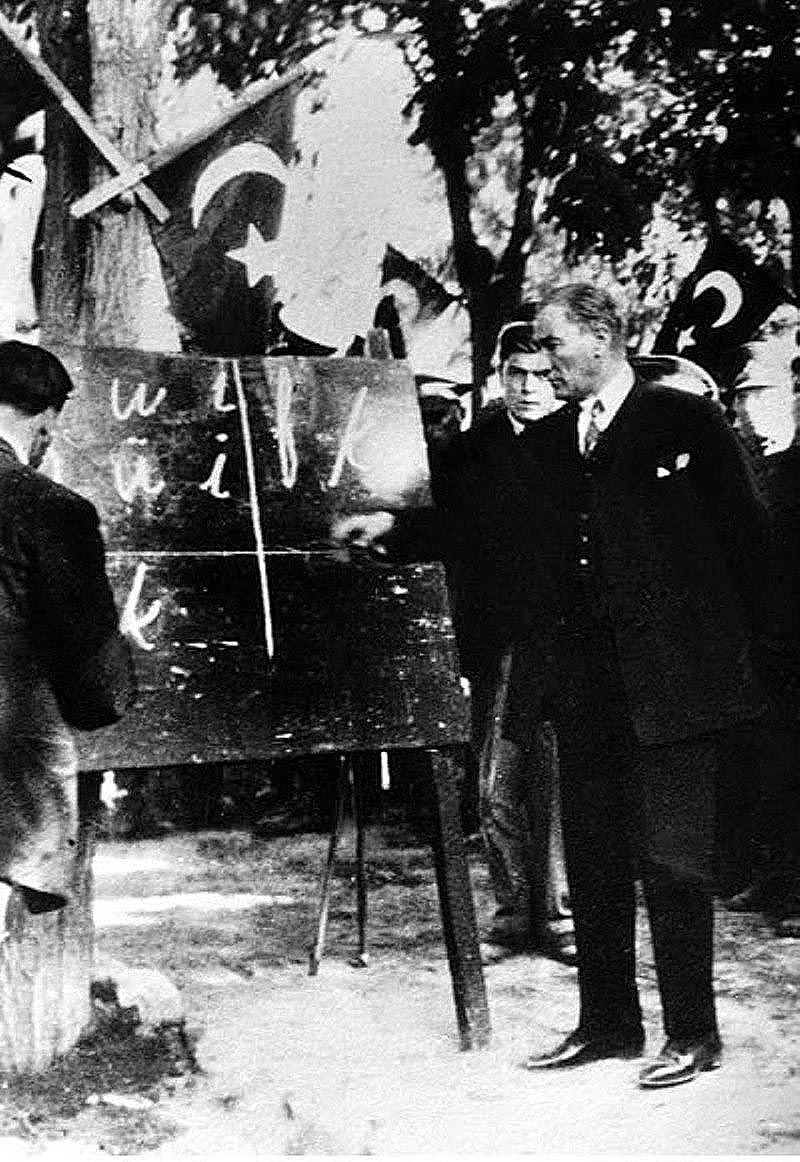
Mustafa Kemal introducing the new Turkish alphabet to the people of Kayseri, 20 September 1928

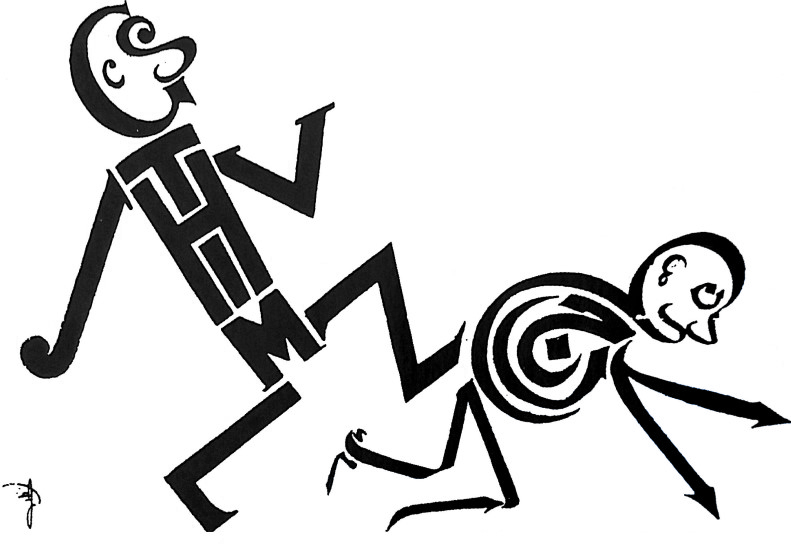
A cartoon published by Ramiz Gökçe in Akbaba on 13 August 1928, depicting the reformist period.

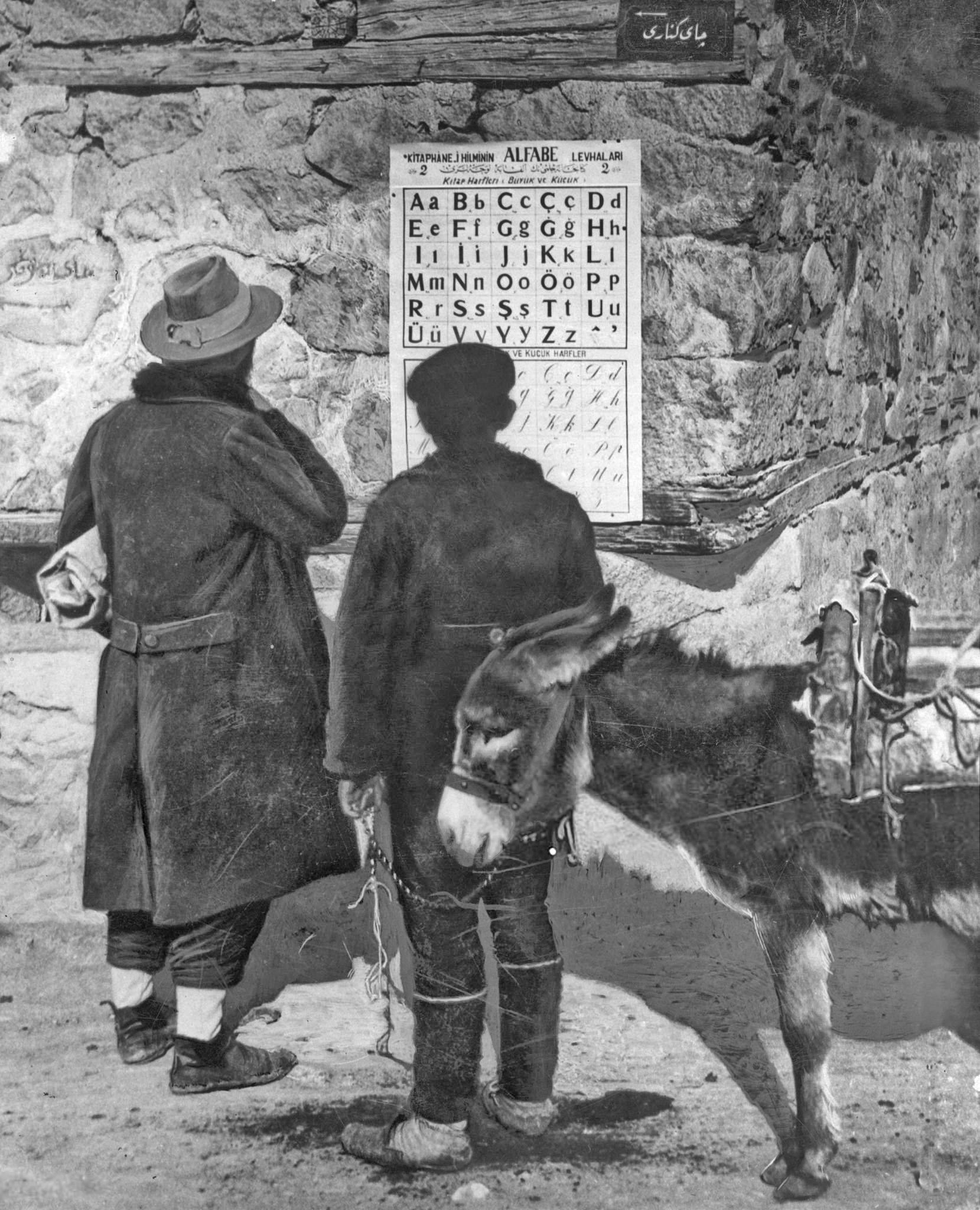
Two Turks exploring the new alphabet displayed on the poster outside the municipal building, 1928.

Turks, since the 10th century, along with the adoption of Islam, also adapted the Arabic script to the Turkish phonology. Over the following 900 years, both western (Ottoman) and eastern dialects of Turkish were written using a modified form of the Arabic script.

Year	Literacy rate
1923	2.5%
1927^{1}	10.5% (1927 official census)
1935^{2}	20.4% (1935 census)

^{1} Census data from one year before the alphabet reform
^{2} Seven years after the introduction of the new Turkish alphabet

In the Ottoman Empire, proposals for alphabet reform began to be heard from the mid-19th century onwards.

== Reasons and arguments ==
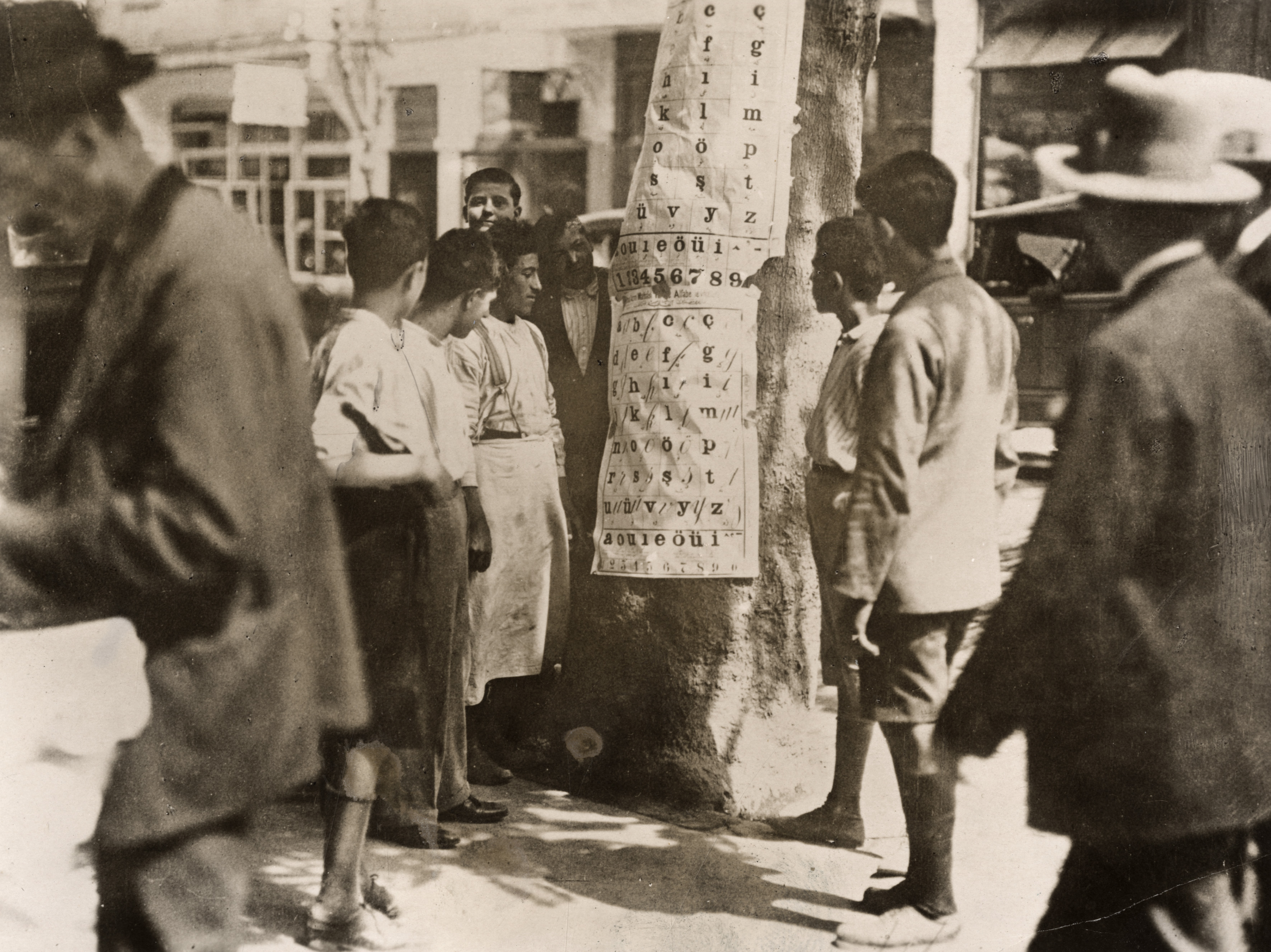
A group of children exploring a poster hung on a tree to help people learn the new alphabet, 1930.

One of the most prominent reasons for the alphabet reform is the belief that the Arabic script was not suitable for the Turkish language. The main argument was that the Arabic script was inadequate in representing the vowel sounds of Turkish. One of the first to express this belief was Kâtip Çelebi. During the Tanzimat period, Ahmed Cevdet Pasha suggested the need for a new writing system to represent sounds that could not be expressed with the Arabic script.

In 1851, Münif Pasha stated that reading and writing with Arabic letters was difficult and that education could not be properly conducted, thus emphasizing the need for reform. Another reason is the belief that the Arabic script hinders education. Milaslı İsmail Hakkı Bey stated that without the alphabet revision, progress would not be possible, and with the revision, progress like that of the Japanese would be possible. Celal Nuri said, "People cannot easily learn these letters and what is written with them". Hüseyin Cahit Yalçın also said, "We cannot reduce illiteracy in our country. Because our alphabet prevents it".

The difficulty in spelling might be due to the absence of vowels in the Arabic alphabet: The Arabic letter wāw (و) represented the phonemes /v/ (nowadays spelled v), /o/ (o), /œ/ (ö), /u/ (u), and /y/ (ü); the letter yāʼ (ﻱ) represented the phonemes /j/ (y), /ɯ/ (ı), and /i/ (i). The kāf (كـ) letter could represent the sounds /k/ (k), /ɡ/ (g), /n/ (n), and occasionally /j/ (y). The existence of multiple letters for /d/ (d), /h/ (h), /s/ (s), /k/ (k), /t/ (t), and /z/ (z) in the Arabic alphabet was unnecessary for Istanbul Turkish. For example, the dāl (ﺩ) and ḍād (ض) letters both represented the /d/ (d) sound, and ḥāʾ (ح) and ḫāʾ (خ) represented the /h/ (h) sound.

The method of separating letters during the reform of the Arabic letters, known as hurûf-ı munfasıla, was tried. It was based on the belief that an alphabet in which the letters are separated is easier to learn.

=== Other early proposals ===
From the 1850s–1860s onwards, most of the Turkish intellectual class knew French. With the spread of telegraphy, a form of Turkish written in the Latin alphabet and according to French spelling became a part of daily life. The habit of using this writing was due to the use of this script on shop signs and advertisements.

There was a decision made at the First All-Union Turkological Congress in Baku to adopt the Latin script instead of the Arabic script for all Turkic languages. It is known that Atatürk closely followed this congress. During the Stalinist era, the Soviet Union forced Turkic states to switch to the Cyrillic script to sever the connection amongst Turkic republics and hinder any pan-Turkic nationalism. After the dissolution of the USSR in 1991, Azerbaijan, Uzbekistan, Turkmenistan, and Kazakhstan switched back to the Latin alphabet.

During the Second Constitutional Era, efforts to define Turkish national identity independently from Islam gained traction, particularly among those close to the Committee of Union and Progress.

=== Early reform proposals ===
The idea of adapting the Latin script to Turkish was first proposed in the 1860s by Iranian Azerbaijani Mirza Fatali Akhundov. Akhundov also prepared an alphabet based on the Cyrillic script.

The adoption of a new Albanian alphabet based on Latin script between 1908 and 1911 created debates. In 1911, Elbasan claimed that Latin script was contrary to Sharia law. Hüseyin Cahit Yalçın later defended the Latin-based Albanian alphabet and suggested that Turks should do the same. In 1911, the Albanian branch of the Committee of Union and Progress accepted the Latin-based alphabet. In 1914, five unsigned articles published in the journal "Hürriyet-i Fikriye" by Kılıçzade Hakkı proposed the gradual adoption of Latin letters, arguing that this change was inevitable. However, the journal was banned by the Committee of Union and Progress government due to these articles.

The first Turkish newspaper printed in the Latin alphabet was published in Manastir-Bitola in 1911. Named "Eças" and pronounced "esas" in French spelling, this newspaper was published on Saturdays by Zekeriya Sami Efendi, but only a few issues have survived to the present day.

=== Atatürk and the alphabet reform ===
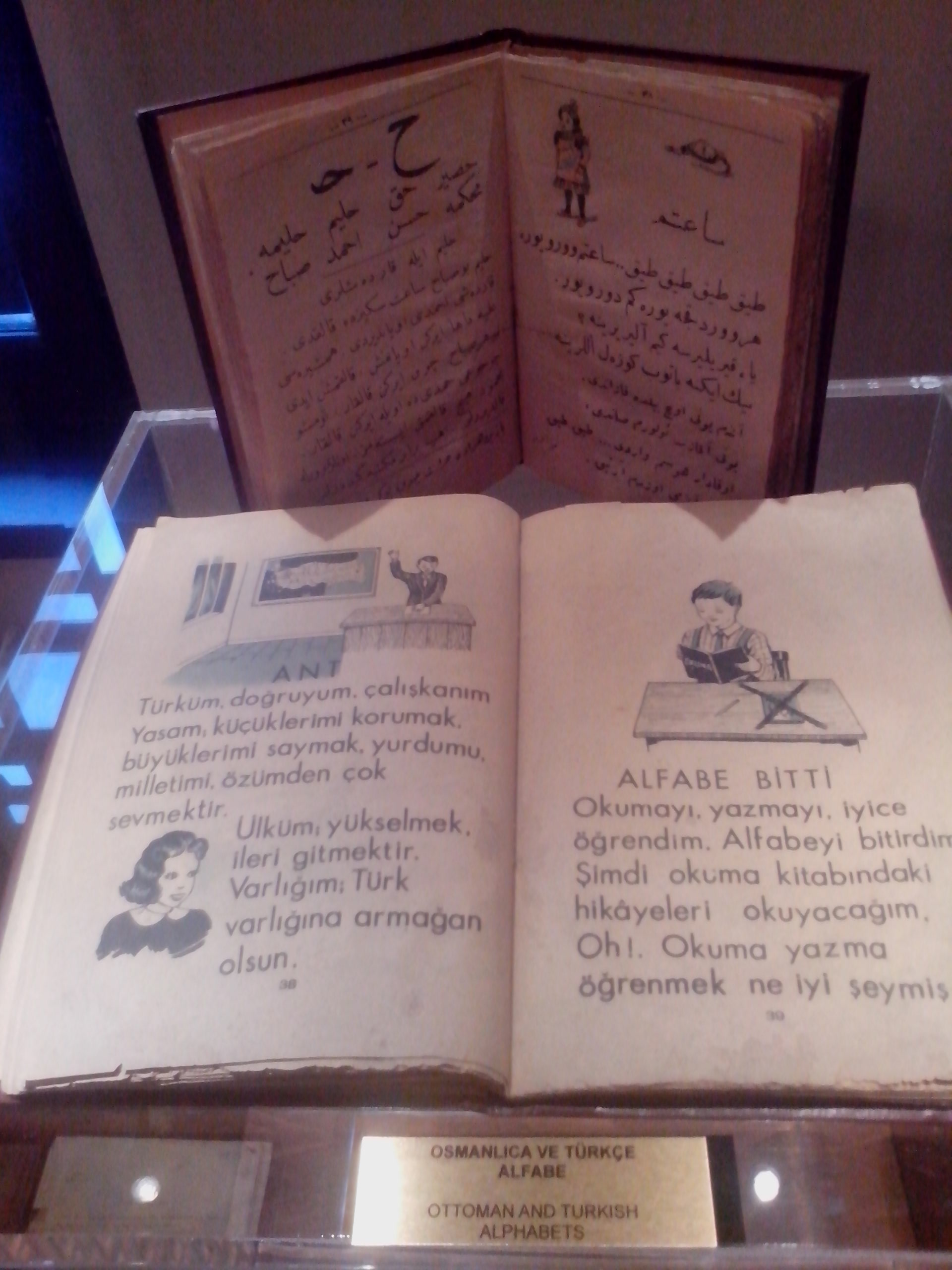
A book used to teach the modern Turkish alphabet alongside a book used to teach the Ottoman Turkish alphabet in the 1930s, displayed at the Republic Museum.

Mustafa Kemal Atatürk became interested in this issue during his time in Syria between 1905 and 1907. In 1922, Atatürk discussed this issue with Halide Edib Adıvar and emphasized that such a change would require strict measures.

In September 1922, during a meeting attended by Istanbul press members, Hüseyin Cahit Yalçın asked Atatürk why they did not accept the Latin script. Atatürk responded, "It's not the right time yet". A similar proposal was made at the İzmir Economic Congress in 1923, but it was rejected by the congress president, Kâzım Karabekir, on the grounds that it would harm the unity of Islam. The discussion received widespread coverage in the press. On 28 May 1928, the Grand National Assembly of Turkey passed a law allowing the use of international numerals in official institutions and organizations starting from 1 June 1928. Around the same time, a commission was established for the alphabet reform.

One of the issues discussed by the commission was the proposal to replace the old "qāf" (ق) and "kāf" (كـ) letters in the Arabic script with "Q" and "K" letters in the new Turkish alphabet, respectively. However, this proposal was rejected by Atatürk, and the letter "q" was removed from the alphabet. According to Falih Rıfkı Atay, who was a member of the commission, Atatürk stated, "This will either be done in three months or never". After the new Turkish alphabet was completed, Atatürk introduced the letters to attendees at the Republican People's Party gala in Gülhane on 9 August 1928.

On 11 August, the new alphabet was introduced to presidential staff and members of parliament, and on 15 August, it was introduced to university professors and writers. In August and September, Atatürk introduced the new alphabet to the public in different cities. At the end of this process, changes were made based on the commission's recommendations, such as omitting the short dash used to add certain suffixes to the word root and adding circumflexes. From 8 to 25 October 1928, all government officials underwent an examination on the use of the new letters.

== Banned letters ==
The law has been used to prosecute people, particularly Kurds, for using letters which are not in the prescribed Turkish alphabet. In 2005, twenty people were fined for holding up placards in the Kurdish language with the letters "q" and "w" on them. In 2007 Osman Baydemir, then mayor of Diyarbakır, was taken to court for using the letter "w" on New Year cards, although the case was later stopped. Reforms in 2013 supposedly legalised use of the letters, but in 2022 the Constitutional Court of Turkey upheld a ban on them being used in names.

== Criticism ==
Peyami Safa, who was vehemently opposed to the alphabet reform, requested that the instruction of the Arabic script and Ottoman Turkish be instituted in secondary education, precisely as is practiced within universities.

In 2019, during a commemoration program for Mustafa Kemal Atatürk, Recep Tayyip Erdoğan claimed in his speech that the literacy rate in the Ottoman Empire was higher than 50%, surpassing countries like Russia and Italy at the time. He asserted that the alphabet reform led to a decline in literacy rates and that "everything was reset" with the alphabet reform. These statements were criticized by various academics and media organizations as being inaccurate. The phrase "We were made ignorant overnight!" (Turkish: Bir gecede cahil kaldık!) has become a common expression used by critics of the alphabet reform.

Responding to these criticisms, educators pointed out that at the time of the alphabet reform, only about 6–7% of the Muslim population was literate, refuting the notion that 94% of the population became illiterate overnight. They argued that Ottoman society was primarily oral rather than written, and thus, there was no significant loss in societal memory. Additionally, they emphasized that those who were literate before the alphabet reform quickly adapted to the new alphabet.

== See also ==
- Turkish language reform
