= Armeno-Turkish alphabet =

Armenian script sometimes used for Turkish until 1928

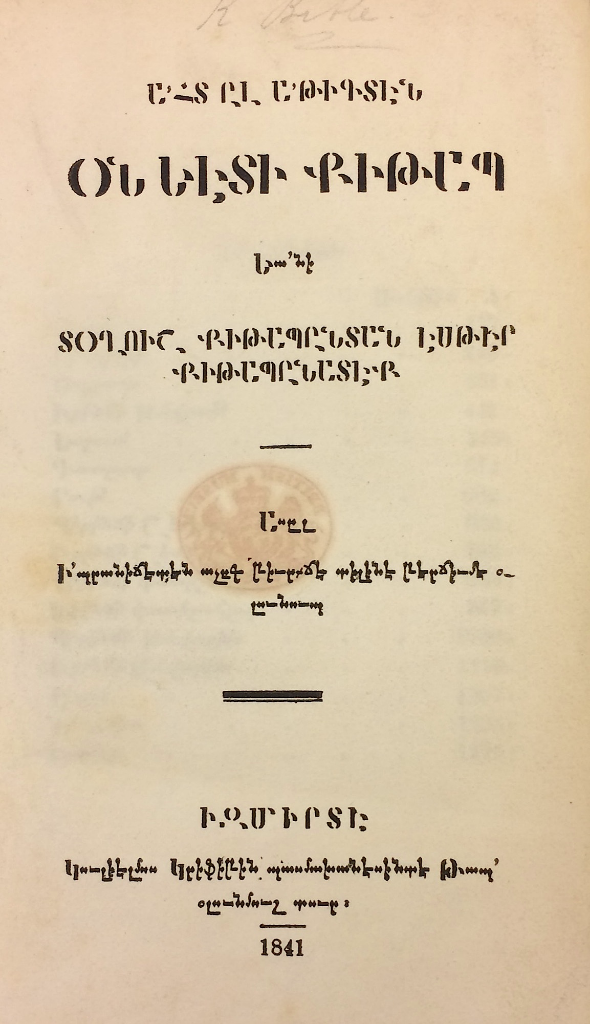
- Front page of the Old Testament written in Armeno-Turkish alphabet
- Script type: Alphabet
- Creator: Mesrop Mashtots
- Languages: Ottoman Turkish language

Related scripts
- Parent systems: Armenian script: Armeno-Turkish alphabet
- Sister systems: Latin; Coptic; Georgian; Cyrillic

The Armeno-Turkish alphabet is a version of the Armenian script sometimes used to write Ottoman Turkish until 1928, when the Latin-based modern Turkish alphabet was introduced. The Armenian script was not just used by ethnic Armenians to write the Turkish language, but also by the non-Armenian Ottoman Turkish elite.

== Introduction ==
The Armeno-Turkish alphabet is a version of the Armenian script that was sometimes used to write the Turkish language, particularly Ottoman Turkish, until the adoption of the modern Latin-based Turkish alphabet in 1928. It was used primarily during the period of the Ottoman Empire, especially in printed materials produced by and for Armenian-speaking communities.

The system is an example of script adaptation in a multilingual society, where different writing systems were used side by side for various languages and communities. Although mainly associated with ethnic Armenians, Armeno-Turkish was also used in some non-Armenian contexts where readers were literate in the Armenian script but spoke Turkish.

== History ==
The Armeno-Turkish alphabet developed in the multilingual environment of the Ottoman Empire, where different writing systems were used by various religious and linguistic communities. Rather than functioning as an isolated tradition, Armeno-Turkish emerged through interaction between Armenian literacy, spoken Ottoman Turkish, and the wider imperial print culture.

From the 18th century onward, Armenian printing presses in cities such as Istanbul and İzmir began producing Turkish-language texts written in the Armenian script. These presses were closely connected to Armenian educational and religious institutions, which supported literacy in Armenian while also enabling the use of Turkish in written form. As a result, Armeno-Turkish functioned as a bridge between spoken Turkish and Armenian written culture.

During the 19th century, the system expanded alongside the growth of print culture in the Ottoman Empire. It was used in newspapers, religious texts, instructional materials, and literary works. Its development is linked to widespread bilingualism among Armenians in the Ottoman Empire, many of whom moved between Armenian cultural life and Turkish-speaking urban environments.

Armeno-Turkish also reflects broader networks of communication in the Ottoman world, connecting printing houses, translators, and missionary organizations involved in publishing and education. These interconnections allowed texts to circulate across linguistic and cultural boundaries.

One of the most well-known works written in Armeno-Turkish is Vartan Pasha’s 1851 novel Akabi Hikâyesi, often considered one of the earliest novels written in Turkish in the Ottoman Empire, though printed in Armenian script.

Armeno-Turkish was also used in translation and missionary publishing activities, particularly in educational and religious texts aimed at Turkish-speaking audiences. This demonstrates its role within interconnected systems of religion, education, and print culture. An American correspondent in Marash in 1864 called the alphabet "Armeno-Turkish", describing it as consisting of 31 Armenian letters and "infinitely superior" to the Arabic or Greek alphabets for rendering Turkish.

== Usage ==
This Armenian script was used alongside the Arabic script for official documents of the Ottoman Empire written in Ottoman Turkish. For instance, the first novel to be written in Turkish in the Ottoman Empire was Vartan Pasha's 1851 Akabi Hikâyesi, written in the Armenian script. In the early 19th century, American Evangelical missionaries began printing vernacular Turkish translations of the Bible written in the Armenian alphabet. The Armeno-Turkish alphabet was primarily used for writing Ottoman Turkish among Armenian communities in the Ottoman Empire. It functioned as a practical writing system in a multilingual environment where Turkish was widely spoken, but literacy traditions differed depending on community and education. It was used in printed and handwritten materials such as newspapers, religious texts, novels, educational books, translations, and commercial documents.

Its usage became particularly widespread during the 18th and 19th centuries with the expansion of Armenian printing presses in major Ottoman cities such as Istanbul and İzmir. These presses supported a bilingual reading public in which many Armenians spoke Turkish in everyday life while remaining literate in the Armenian script, making Armeno-Turkish a functional bridge between spoken language and written communication.

Armeno-Turkish was also used in missionary and educational publishing, especially for Turkish-language religious texts aimed at local audiences. In some contexts, it was considered effective for representing Turkish pronunciation more clearly than the Arabic-based Ottoman script, which had different phonetic limitations.

The use of Armeno-Turkish declined in the early 20th century following political changes in the late Ottoman period and the adoption of the Latin-based Turkish alphabet in 1928.

== Alphabet ==
Letter	Name	Additional information	Ottoman Turkish (Arabic) alphabet	Modern Latin alphabet	IPA
Ա ա	այբ ayp	—	ا	a	/a/
(Բ բ)	բեն pen	not used in Turkish words	—	(b)	—
Գ գ	գիմ kim	used before hard vowels	ق	k (before a, ı, o, u)	/k/
Դ դ	դա ta	some authors used before hard vowels	ط	t (before a, ı, o, u)	/t/
Ե ե	եչ yeç	not used in diphthongs	ی	y	/j/
Զ զ	զա za	—	ز, ذ, ظ, ض	z	/z/
Է է	է e	—	ا	e	/e/
Ը ը	ըթ ıt	—	ی	ı	/ɯ/
Թ թ	թօ to	—	ط, ت	t (before e, i, ö, ü)	/t/
Ժ ժ	ժէ je	—	ژ	j	/ʒ/
Ի ի	ինի ini	—	ی	i	/i/
Լ լ	լիւն lün	—	ل	l	/ɫ/, /l/
Խ խ	խէ he	only used for Arabic kha	خ	h	/h/
(Ծ ծ)	ծա dza	not used in Turkish words	—	(dz)	—
Կ կ	կեն gen	—	گ	g or ğ (before e, i, ö, ü)	/ɟ/, /ː/
Հ հ	հօ ho	—	ه, ح	h	/h/
(Ձ ձ)	ձա tsa	not used in Turkish words	—	(ts)	—
Ղ ղ	ղատ gat	—	غ	g or ğ (before a, ı, o, u)	/ɡ/, /ː/
Ճ ճ	ճէ ce	—	ج	c	/d͡ʒ/
Մ մ	մեն men	—	م	m	/m/
Յ յ	հի hi	only used in diphthongs	ی	y	/j/
Ն ն	նու nu	—	ن	n	/n/
Շ շ	շա şa	—	ش	ş	/ʃ/
Ո ո	ո vo	only used in digraphs	—	—	—
Չ չ	չա ça	—	چ	ç	/t͡ʃ/
Պ պ	պէ be	—	ب	b	/b/
(Ջ ջ)	ջէ çe	not used in Turkish words	—	(ç)	—
(Ռ ռ)	ռա ra	not used in Turkish words	—	(r)	—
Ս ս	սէ se	—	س, ث, ص	s	/s/
Վ վ	վեւ vev	—	و	v	/v/
Տ տ	տիւն dün	—	د, ط	d	/d/
Ր ր	րէ re	—	ر	r	/ɾ/
(Ց ց)	ցօ tso	not used in Turkish words	—	(ts)	—
Ւ ւ	հիւն hün	only used in digraphs	—	—	—
Փ փ	փիւր pür	—	پ	p	/p/
Ք ք	քէ ke	—	ك	k (before e, i, ö, ü)	/c/
Օ օ	օ o	—	و	o	/o/
Ֆ ֆ	ֆէ fe	—	ف	f	/f/

=== Digraphs ===
Although the Armenian alphabet fits the Turkish phonology very well, a few digraphs are needed to write all Turkish sounds, especially vowels. Some of them are also present in Armenian orthography.

Digraph	Additional information	Ottoman Turkish (Arabic) alphabet	Modern Latin alphabet	IPA
Ու ու	—	و	u	/u/
Իւ իւ	—	و	ü	/y/
Էօ էօ	—	و	ö	/ø/
Նկ նկ	not present in modern Turkish	ڭ	(n)	/n/, (/ŋ/)

== See also ==
- Karamanli Turkish
- Ottoman Turkish alphabet
