= Nasri Khattar =

Lebanese architect and type designer

- نصري خطار
- Born: 1911
- Died: 1998 (aged 86–87)
- Education: Yale School of Architecture

Nasri Khattar (1911–1998) (Arabic: نصري خطار was an architect and type designer from Lebanon. He is famous for pioneering an Arabic typeface he called "Unified Arabic," a typeface that condensed the possible forms of Arabic letters, making it more suitable for printing technologies of the time. Khattar was nominated for the Nobel Peace Prize in 1986 for his lifelong work on the Unified Arabic project.

Khattar drew inspiration from old letters, which were separated. He gave each letter of the Arabic abjad a single form instead of the four possible forms of an Arabic letter depending on its position within the word: initial, medial, final, and isolated. This helped reduce the number of glyphs necessary to print Arabic to 33.

For each letter, he combined elements of the glyph for the individual form with elements of the glyphs for connected forms. He said that his writing system was economical because it would save paper and that it was easy to read and learn, but that it was for printing only—which is to say that handwriting would not change.

His idea was patented in 1947 and launched in 1957.

In 2013, the type foundry 29LT released a set of fonts reviving Nasri Khattar's Unified Arabic project after his daughter Camille Khattar Hedrick entrusted the firm to do so.

== Works ==
- الأبجدية الموحدة لتسهيل الحروف الهجائية – نصري خطار- 1947.
- شوف بابا شوف – نصري خطار- 1955
