= Ottoman Turkish alphabet =

Arabic-based script for Ottoman Turkish

- Script type: Abjad
- Period: 1299–1928
- Direction: Right-to-left script
- Languages: Ottoman Turkish

Related scripts
- Parent systems: Egyptian hieroglyphs: Proto-Sinaitic; Phoenician; Aramaic; Nabataean; Arabic; Perso-Arabic; Ottoman Turkish alphabet
- Child systems: Arebica; Albanian Arabic alphabet; Enver's alphabet

ISO 15924
- ISO 15924: Arab (160), Arabic

Unicode
- Unicode alias: Arabic
- Unicode range: U+0600 .. U+06FF; U+FB50 .. U+FDFF; U+FE70 .. U+FEFF

The Ottoman Turkish alphabet (Ottoman Turkish: الفبا, romanized: elifbâ) is a version of the Arabic script used to write Ottoman Turkish for over 600 years until 1928, when it was replaced by the Latin-based modern Turkish alphabet.

Though Ottoman Turkish was primarily written in this script, non-Muslim Ottoman subjects sometimes wrote it in other scripts, including Armenian, Greek, Latin and Hebrew alphabets.

== History ==
=== Origins ===
The various Turkic languages have been written in a number of different alphabets, including Arabic, Cyrillic, Greek, Latin and other writing systems.

The earliest known Turkic alphabet is the Orkhon script. When Turks adopted Islam, they began to use Arabic script for their languages, especially under the Kara-Khanids. Though the Seljuks used Persian as their official language, in the late Seljuk period, Turkish began to be written again in Anatolia in the nascent Ottoman state.

The Ottoman Turkish alphabet is a form of the Perso-Arabic script that, despite not being able to differentiate O and U, was otherwise generally better suited to writing Turkic words rather than Perso-Arabic words. Turkic words had all of their vowels written in and had systematic spelling rules and seldom needed to be memorized. Other Oghuz Turkic languages such as Azerbaijani and Turkmen enjoyed a high degree of written mutual intelligibility as the Ottoman Alphabet catered to anachronistic Turkic consonants and spellings that demonstrated Anatolian Turkish' shared history with Azerbaijani and Turkmen. The Ottoman Turkish alphabet however was poorly suited to Arabic and Persian loanwords which needed to be memorized by students learning Turkish as it would omit vowels making them difficult to read. Arabic has several consonants that do not exist in Turkish, making several Arabic letters superfluous.

The introduction of the telegraph and the printing press in the 19th century exposed further weaknesses in the Arabic script.

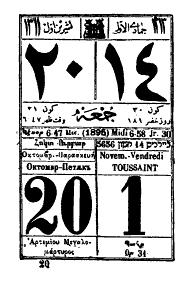
A calendar page for November 1, 1895 (October 20 OS) in cosmopolitan Thessaloniki. The first 3 lines in Ottoman Turkish Arabic script give the date in the Rumi, 20 Teşrin-i Evvel 1311, and Islamic, 14 Jumādā al-Ūlā 1313, calendars; the Julian and Gregorian (in French) dates appear below.

Enver Pasha's hurûf-ı munfasıla of 1917

Some Turkish reformers promoted the Latin script well before Atatürk's reforms. In 1862, during an earlier period of reform, the statesman Münif Pasha advocated a reform of the alphabet. At the start of the 20th century, similar proposals were made by several writers associated with the Young Turk movement, including Hüseyin Cahit, Abdullah Cevdet and Celâl Nuri. In 1917, Enver Pasha introduced a revised alphabet, the hurûf-ı munfasıla representing Turkish sounds more accurately; it was based on Arabic letter forms, but written separately, not joined cursively. It was for a time the official script of the Army.

The romanization issue was raised again in 1923 during the İzmir Economic Congress of the new Turkish Republic, sparking a public debate that was to continue for several years. A move away from the Arabic script was strongly opposed by conservative and religious elements. It was argued that romanization of the script would detach Turkey from the wider Islamic world, substituting a foreign (European) concept of national identity for the confessional community.

Others opposed romanization on practical grounds, as there was no suitable adaptation of the Latin script that could be used for Turkish phonemes. Some suggested that a better alternative might be to modify the Arabic script to introduce extra characters for better representing Turkish vowels.

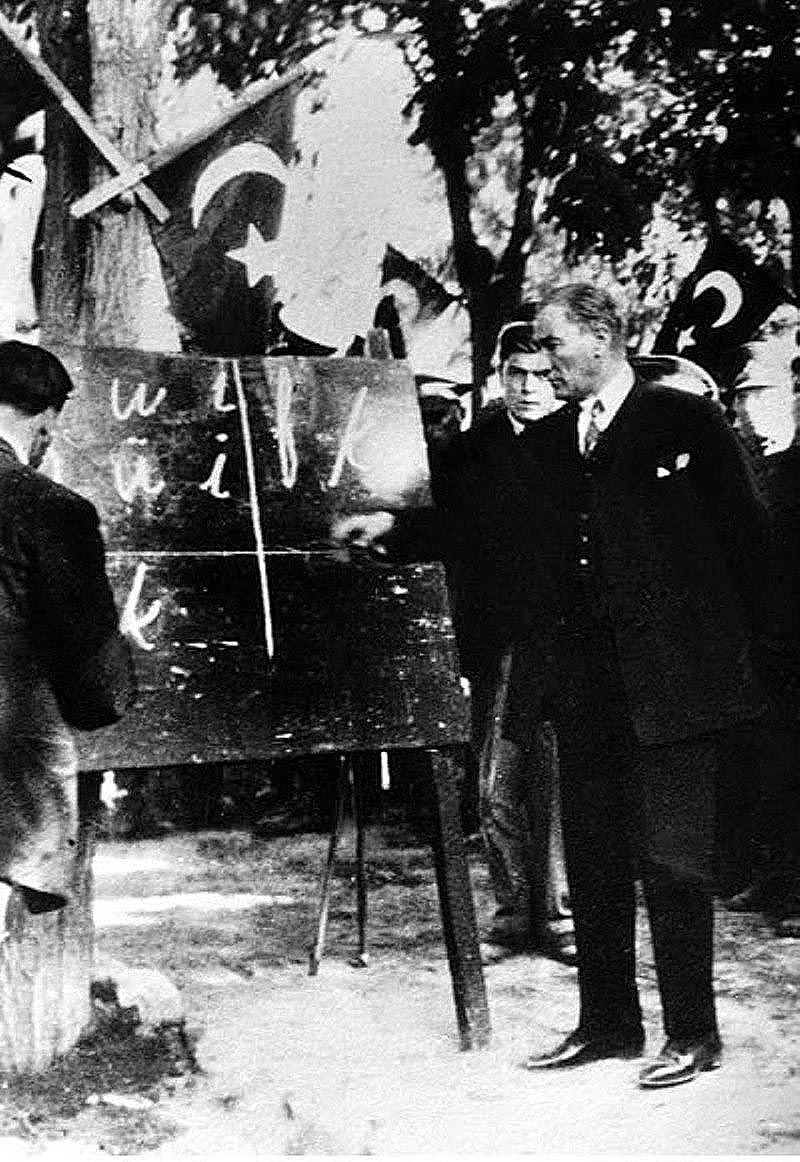
Atatürk introducing the new Turkish alphabet to the people of Kayseri, September 20, 1928

In 1926, the Turkic republics of the Soviet Union adopted the Latin script, giving a major boost to reformers in Turkey.

=== Replacement ===
Ottoman Turkish script was replaced by the Latin-based new Turkish alphabet. Its use became compulsory in all public communications in 1929. The change was formalized by the Law on the Adoption and Implementation of the Turkish Alphabet, passed on November 1, 1928, and effective on January 1, 1929.

== Alphabet ==
As with Arabic, Persian and Urdu, texts in the Ottoman Turkish alphabet are written right to left. The appearance of a letter changes depending on its position in a word:

- isolated (in a one-letter word);
- final (in which case it is joined on the right to the preceding letter);
- medial (joined on both sides); and
- initial (joined on the left to the following letter).

Some letters cannot be joined to the left and so do not possess separate medial and initial forms. In medial position, the final form is used. In initial position, the isolated form is used.

There were no standardised romanisation rules for Ottoman Turkish, and throughout the many centuries that the language was in use, transcriptions varied greatly. A notable example is the Treaty of Küçük Kaynarca, which was variously transcribed as "Kuchuk Kainardji", "Kuchuk Kainarji", "Koutchouk-Kaïnardji", "Kütschük Kainardschi", or "Chiuciuc Cainarggi" depending on the source and the linguistic background of the translator.

Isolated	Final	Medial	Initial	Name	Modern Turkish	ALA-LC	IPA
ا	ـا	—		elif	a, e, â	—, ā, '	æ, e, —, (ʔ), aː
ء	—			hemze	—, '		—, (ʔ)
ب	ـب	ـبـ	بـ	be	b (p)	b	b (p)
پ	ـپ	ـپـ	پـ	pe	p		p
ت	ـت	ـتـ	تـ	te	t		t
ث	ـث	ـثـ	ثـ	se	s	s̠	s
ج	ـج	ـجـ	جـ	cim	c		d͡ʒ
چ	ـچ	ـچـ	چـ	çim	ç		t͡ʃ
ح	ـح	ـحـ	حـ	ha	h	ḥ	h
خ	ـخ	ـخـ	خـ	hı	h	ḫ	h (x)
د	ـد	—		dal	d		d
ذ	ـذ	—		zel	z	z̠	z
ر	ـر	—		re	r		ɾ
ز	ـز	—		ze	z		z
ژ	ـژ	—		je	j		ʒ
س	ـس	ـسـ	سـ	sin	s		s
ش	ـش	ـشـ	شـ	şın	ş	ș	ʃ
ص	ـص	ـصـ	صـ	sad	s	ṣ	s
ض	ـض	ـضـ	ضـ	dad	d, z	ż	z (d)
ط	ـط	ـطـ	طـ	tı	t	ṭ	t (d)
ظ	ـظ	ـظـ	ظـ	zı	z	ẓ	z
ع	ـع	ـعـ	عـ	ayn	', —	‘	—, ◌ː, ʔ
غ	ـغ	ـغـ	غـ	gayn	g, ğ, (v)	ġ	g, ɣ, ◌ː, v
ف	ـف	ـفـ	فـ	fe	f		f
ق	ـق	ـقـ	قـ	qaf	k	q	k (q)
ك	ـك	ـكـ	كـ	kef	k, g, ğ, (y, v), n, (ñ)		c, k, ɟ, g, j, v, n, (ŋ), j
گ	ـگ	ـگـ	گـ	gef (Note: In most texts, kef, gef, and sağır kef are written the same way although one Ottoman variant of gef has a "mini-kaf" of ﻙ as well as the doubled upper stroke of گ. In general, /g/ and /ŋ/ sounds are represented by kef ك. The letter ڭ (kef with three dots above) also appears to be denoting the sound /g/ in Early Ottoman Turkish manuscripts, also known as kef-i Farisi ("Persian kef").), kāf-ı fārsī	g, ğ, (y, v)	g	ɟ, g, j, v
ڭ	ـڭ	ـڭـ	ڭـ	nef, ñef, sağır kef, kāf-ı nūnī	n	ñ	n, (ŋ)
ل	ـل	ـلـ	لـ	lam	l		l
م	ـم	ـمـ	مـ	mim	m		m
ن	ـن	ـنـ	نـ	nun	n		n
و	ـو	—		vav	v, o, ö, u, ü, û	v, ū, aw, avv, ūv	v, o, œ, u, y, uː
ه	ـه	ـهـ	هـ	he (Note: Persian and Ottoman use the order vāv, he, ye, though in Arabic, they are he, vāv, ye.)	h, e, a	h (Note: The Library of Congress recommends for he (هـ) in a word in the construct state to be romanised t and when a word ending in he is used adverbially, it should be romanised tan.)	h, æ, e, a
ی	ـی	ـیـ	یـ	ye	y, ı, i, î	y, ī, ay, á, īy	j, ɯ, i, iː

=== Notes ===
Position in word:	Isolated	Final	Medial	Initial
Glyph form: (Help)	ة	ـة	ـة	ة

== Sound–letter correspondence ==
The orthography of Ottoman Turkish, like many other abjads, is complex:

- Many Turkish sounds can be written with several different letters. For example, the phoneme /s/ can be written as ⟨ث⟩, ⟨س⟩, or ⟨ص⟩.
- Conversely, some letters have more than one value: ⟨ک⟩ k may be /k/, /ɡ/, /n/, /j/, or /ː/ (lengthening the preceding vowel; modern ğ)
- Vowels are written ambiguously or not at all. For example, the text ⟨کورك⟩ kwrk can be read as /ɟevɾec/ 'biscuit', /cyɾc/ 'fur', /cyɾec/ 'shovel', /cøryc/ 'bellows', /ɟørek/ 'view', which in modern orthography are written gevrek, kürk, kürek, körük, görek.

The Persian consonant (ژ) is not native to Turkish but is still pronounced distinctively with the letter J in the modern Turkish Latin alphabet.

=== Vowels ===
Turkish has 8 total vowels which are evenly split between front and back vowels. One of the shortcomings of the Ottoman Turkish alphabet is that it could not differentiate between the front and back vowels with the exception of A and E. This situation required readers to infer the frontness or backness of vowels based on consonants and the vowels A and E.

Another shortcoming was that it could not differentiate between O/Ö and U/Ü in the first syllable (O/Ö do not exist in the second syllable in Turkic, Arabic, or Persian words with the exception of one suffix -iyor/ıyor). Although this issue only existed in the first syllable, the O/Ö sounds were generally more common than U/Ü in the first syllable.

=== Arabic and Persian Borrowings ===
They are written in their original orthography: for example, and if using Arabic vowel points (harakat), sabit 'firm' is written as ⟨ثَابِت⟩ s̱âbit, with ⟨ث⟩ s̱ representing /s/ (in Arabic /θ/), ⟨ا⟩ representing the long vowel /aː/ as in Arabic, ⟨ب⟩ representing /b/, ⟨ـِ⟩ representing the short vowel /i/, and ⟨ت⟩ representing /t/. However, as in Arabic and Persian, harakat are generally found only in dictionaries and didactic works, therefore the same word sabit will generally be found written thus: ⟨ثابت⟩ (with no indication of the short /i/). As in Persian, the alif hamza ⟨أ⟩ is rarely used in initial position and is replaced instead by a plain alif ⟨ا⟩; the ta marbuta (⟨ة⟩, appearing in final position of Arabic words) is also rarely used itself and is instead replaced by a plain ha ⟨ه⟩. The letters ث ح ذ ض ظ ع are found only in borrowings from Arabic; ژ is only in borrowings from Persian and French.

=== Consonants ===
Consonant letters are classified in three series, based on vowel harmony: soft, hard, and neutral. The soft consonant letters, ت س ک گ ه, are found in front vowel (e, i, ö, ü) contexts; the hard, ح خ ص ض ط ظ ع غ ق, in back vowel (a, ı, o, u) contexts; and the neutral, ب پ ث ج چ د ذ ر ز ژ ش ف ل م ن, in either. In Perso-Arabic borrowings, the vowel used in Turkish depends on the softness of the consonant. Thus, ⟨كلب⟩ klb 'dog' (Arabic /kalb/) is /kelb/, while ⟨قلب⟩ ḳlb 'heart' (Arabic /qalb/) is /kalb/. Conversely, in Turkish words, the choice of consonant reflects the native vowel.

On the other hand, both soft and hard consonants (especially in Perso-Arabic borrowings) forcibly become either hard (a, o, u) or soft (i) when vowels are etymologically long, e.g. ⟨ایمان⟩ 'iman' (faith), ⟨حساب⟩ 'hesap' (arithmetic), ⟨صحیح⟩ 'sahih' (authentic, true), ⟨عید⟩ 'id' (Islamic holiday), etc.

Despite these rules, there might be few exceptions that break these rules, e.g. ⟨عمر⟩ 'Ömer' (where it should theoretically pronounced 'Omer'), ⟨ایوب⟩ 'Eyüp' (where it should theoretically pronounced 'Eyyup'), ⟨تمام⟩ 'tamam' (where it should be theoretically 'temam', just like سلام 'selam'),

Phoneme	/t/	/d/	/s/	/z/	/k/	/ɡ/	/∅/	/h/
Soft (front)	ت	د	س	ز	ک	گ	ء	ه
Hard (back)	ط	ط ض	ص	ظ ض	ق	غ	ع	ح خ

All other letters are considered by default soft [front].

=== Vowels Letters ===
In Turkish words, vowels are sometimes written using the vowel letters as the second letter of a syllable: elif ⟨ا⟩ for /a/; ye ⟨ی⟩ for /i/, /ɯ/; vav ⟨و⟩ for /o/, /œ/, /u/, /y/; he ⟨ه⟩ for /a/, /e/. The corresponding harakat are there: üstün ⟨○َ⟩ (Arabic fatḥah) for /a/, /e/; esre ⟨○ِ⟩ (Arabic kasrah) for /ɯ/, /i/; ötre ⟨○ُ⟩ (Arabic ḍammah) for /o/, /œ/, /u/, /y/. The names of the harakat are also used for the corresponding vowels.

Name	Arabic name	Point	Letter	Front reading	Back reading
üstün	fatḥah	َ○	ا elif ه he	/e/	/a/
esre	kasrah	ِ○	ی ye	/i/	/ɯ/
ötre	ḍammah	ُ○	و vav	/œ/, /y/	/o/, /u/

=== Orthographic conventions ===
The rule for vowels in native Turkish words are the following:

1. Never introduce a vowel letter into a Turkish or foreign Ottoman word without removing a possible doubt as to pronunciation;
2. Never leave out a vowel in such a word, if by omission a doubt is created as to the pronunciation.

The above rules have the two following exceptions:

1. In any syllable which is composed of two consonants, if the vowel is soft üstün (see vowel table above), none of the orthographic (vowel) letters is added; but if it is composed of one letter, he (ـه ه) is added to indicate the vowel;
  - گلدی (gel-di)
  - بش (beş)‌
  - ایسته‌مک (is-te-mek) (the letter he distinguishes it from i-set-mek, and other possible misreadings)
1. None of the grammatical affixes take the orthographic or vowel letters. (This contrasts with other historic and modern Arabic-based Turkic orthographies, such as Chagatai)
  - گلدم (gel-dim)
  - باشلر (baş-lar)
  - اوچلک (üç-lük)
  - آلمق (al-mak)

== Dictionary notations ==
As mentioned in previous sections, in written Ottoman Turkish conventions, some letters, especially the letter ⟨ک⟩ k could represent many phonemes: /k/, /ɡ/, /n/, /j/, or /ː/ (lengthening the preceding vowel; modern ğ). Same applied to vowels, if they were even written using elif ⟨ا⟩ for /a/; ye ⟨ی⟩ for /i/, /ɯ/; vav ⟨و⟩ for /o/, /œ/, /u/, /y/; he ⟨ه⟩ for /a/, /e/. In many cases they were not.

Therefore, some Ottoman Turkish dictionaries and language textbooks sought to address this issue by introducing new notations and letters. None of these proposed notations ever gained wider popularity, and none came to be adopted by the society at large. For example, in the Ottoman Turkish-Turkish compiled by Ottoman Albanian lexicographer Şemseddin Sâmi, these notations have been defined and have been used. The necessity arose from the fact that this was a solely Turkish dictionary, and thus Şemseddin Sâmi avoided using any Latin or other foreign notations.

The other book with such notations is a book called the Ottoman Turkish Guide (Osmanlıca. 1: Rehberi). This book was first published in 1976, and has been continuously published over the years well into the 21st century. This book by Ali Kemal Belviranlı, is an alphabet premier book and guide, and its primary purpose is to help and teach modern native Turkish speakers who are literate in the modern Latin alphabet, to learn and be able to read and decipher older Turkish language documents that were written in the Ottoman Turkish alphabet. This book also employs specific notations and letters in order to distinguish between different phonemes, so as to match with the Modern Turkish alphabet.

Azerbaijani Turkish orthography, which at the time was similar to Ottoman Turkish orthography, has undergone a similar process in Iran, of letters being assigned diacritics and notations to distinguish them. Those modifications have over the decades gained widespread legitimacy and acceptance. These are also shown for comparison in the table below.

Letter	IPA	Ottoman Turkish Dictionary (Ş. Sâmi)	Ottoman Turkish Guide (A. K. Belviranlı)	Modern Azerbaijani (Iran)
U u	[u]	و		وُ
O o	[o]	وۤ		وْ
Ü ü	[y]	ۏ	ۉ	وٚ
Ö ö	[œ]	ۊ	ۆ	ؤ
I ı (Note: Due to the conservative nature of Ottoman Turkish orthography, and its inspiration from Arabic conventions, many vowels, including the vowels Iı, Aa, and others, were not written out all the time, which made reading of words containing these vowels difficult for non-native speakers.)	[ɯ]	◌ٖ / یٖـ / یٖ		یٛـ / یٛ
A a	[a]	◌َ / ◌ٰ / ـا / هٰ ـهٰ		ـا
K k (Note: When adjacent to the central and back vowels /a, ɯ, o, u/, the letter Kk in modern Turkish Latin script corresponded to the Arabic letter qaf ⟨ق⟩ whose pronunciation would either be [k] or [q]. This table excludes this specific context for the letter Kk, and only covers them when adjacent to front vowels /e, i, œ, y/.)	[k~c]	ك		ک
G g (Note: When adjacent to the central and back vowels /a, ɯ, o, u/, the letter Gg in modern Turkish Latin script corresponded to the Arabic letter ğayn ⟨غ⟩ whose pronunciation original pronunciation would either be [ɣ] or [g]. This table excludes this specific context for the letter Gg, and only covers them when adjacent to front vowels /e, i, œ, y/.)	[g~ɟ]	گ	گ (Note: In the Ottoman Turkish Guide by A. K. Belviranlı the distinction between the letters Gg and Ğğ did not exist in the earlier version (1976). In the earlier version, both of these letters were represented by the letter gâf ⟨گ⟩.)	گ
Ğ ğ (Note: When adjacent to the central and back vowels /a, ɯ, o, u/, the letter Ğğ in modern Turkish Latin script corresponded to the Arabic letter ğayn ⟨غ⟩ whose pronunciation original pronunciation would either be [ɣ] or [g], and modern pronunciation [ː] or [.] (lengthening of the preceding vowel or a syllable break). This table excludes this specific context for the letter Ğğ, and only covers them when adjacent to front vowels /e, i, œ, y/.)	‌ [ː], [.], [j] ([g ~ ɟ])	ࢰ	ࢰ	گ
N n (ñ)	[n] ([ŋ])	ڭ		ن

== Other scripts ==
Other scripts were sometimes used by non-Muslims to write Ottoman Turkish since the Arabic alphabet was identified with Islam.

The first novel to be written in the Ottoman Empire was Akabi (1851), which was written in the Armenian script by Vartan Pasha. Similarly, when the Armenian Duzian family managed the Ottoman mint during the reign of Sultan Abdülmecid I (r. 1839–61), they kept records in Ottoman Turkish but used the Armenian script.

The Greek alphabet and the Rashi script of Hebrew were used by Greeks, Orthodox Turks and Jews for Ottoman. Greek-speaking Muslims would write Greek using the Ottoman Turkish script. Karamanlides (Orthodox Turks in Central Anatolia around Karaman region) used Greek letters for Ottoman Turkish.

== Numerals ==
Ottoman Turkish used Eastern Arabic numerals. The following is the list of basic cardinal numerals with the spelling in the modern Turkish alphabet:

Arabic form	Number	Ottoman Turkish	Modern Turkish
٠	0	صفر	sıfır
١	1	بیر	bir
٢	2	ایكی	iki
٣	3	اوچ	üç
٤	4	دورت	dört
٥	5	بش	beş
٦	6	آلتی	altı
٧	7	یدی	yedi
٨	8	سکیز	sekiz
٩	9	دوقوز	dokuz
١٠	10	اون	on
١٠٠	100	يوز	yüz
١٠٠٠	1000	بیڭ	bin
