= Unified Arabic =

Typeface script for Arabic

Unified Arabic is a script typeface designed by Lebanese architect and type designer Nasri Khattar in 1932, with the intention of making Arabic easier to print. It consists of 30 letterforms and focuses on letters more suitable for learners. Khattar, a graduate of Yale University, was initially unsuccessful at convincing the Academy of the Arabic Language in Cairo to adopt his proposal, but gained the support of Christian missionary Frank Laubach. in 1947, Khattar and Laubach worked with IBM to design six typewriters for King Farouk of Egypt, and a second attempt to bring the script before the academy also failed, despite being considered. A new proposal to the Ford Foundation resulted in a grant for US$75,000.00 for Khattar, as well as a salary. Ultimately, the typeface did not gain traction.

== See Also ==
- Hurûf-ı munfasıla
