= Persophilia =

Affinity towards the Persian people

Persophilia (Persian: پارسی دوستی, pârsi dusti) is the feeling or expression of interest in, respect for, and appreciation of Persians on the part of a non-Persian. More specifically, a Persophile is someone who has a strongly positive predisposition or sympathy towards Persia and the Persian people, with an admiration for their language and literature, culture (art, music, cuisine, etc.), history, or government. The earliest use of the word may have been by the Royal Numismatic Society of the United Kingdom in 1838, referring to the pro-Persian policy of a Cypriot king of Marion. The opposite sentiment is known as Persophobia.

== Origins ==
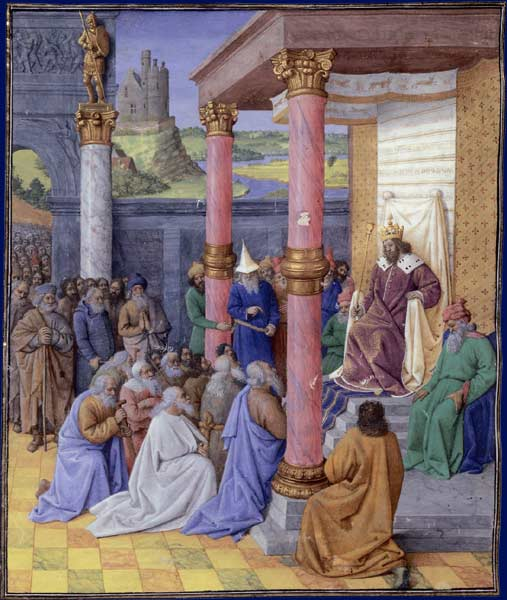
A painting of Cyrus the Great, the founder of the Achaemenid Empire and one of the most admired figures in Persian history.

=== Ancient Iran ===
Foreign admiration of Persian society was especially prevalent during and after the reign of Cyrus the Great, who founded the Achaemenid Empire around 550 BC. He is held in high regard in Judaism for the role he played in ending the Babylonian captivity and enabling the return to Zion, as the eponymous Edict of Cyrus granted permission to the Jewish people to return to the Land of Israel and rebuild the Temple in Jerusalem following the fall of Babylon, thus marking the beginning of the Second Temple period; Cyrus is the only non-Jew to be revered as a Messiah (מָשִׁיחַ) in the Hebrew Bible, as noted in Isaiah 45:1, which states that he was anointed by Yahweh. Many leaders of ancient Greece who gave themselves Persian titles or names during the Achaemenid era were considered Persophiles. Alexander the Great, who lived two centuries after Cyrus, was an avid admirer of Cyrus' style of governance and of Persian customs as a whole, and implemented the same model for his Macedonian Empire, while striving to mix Greek culture with Persian culture in order to tie the two civilizations together. Likewise, the Macedonian satrap Peucestas gained the support of his subjects in Persis due to his Persophilic tendencies. In Phoenicia, some kings of Sidon, namely those who implemented policies giving special rights to the Persians, may also be referred to as Persophiles.

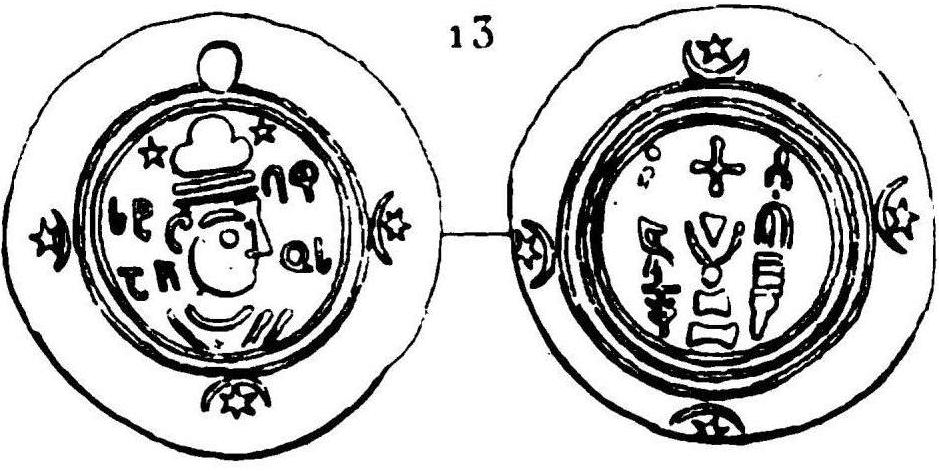
Visualization of the "Ibero-Sasanian" coin, which was introduced by Stephen I of Iberia. On the reverse, there is a Christian cross and a Zoroastrian atar, with the former representing the Georgian people and their Kingdom of Iberia and the latter representing the Persian people and their Sasanian Empire.

In the Caucasus, some historical leaders are notable for their pro-Persian policies, such as Stephen I of Iberia, who sided with the Sasanian Empire during the Byzantine–Sasanian War of 602–628, in spite of the fact that his father had openly favoured the Byzantine Empire.

=== Medieval and modern eras ===
Harun al-Rashid and Al-Ma'mun, two Arabs who ruled the Abbasid Caliphate in the 8th and 9th centuries, are described by British scholar Percy Sykes as Persophiles, owing to their pro-Persian policies. Persia became part of the artistic, cultural, and literary legacy throughout the Islamic world. The Persianate refers to this greater Persian cultural sphere, including its Turco-Persian and Indo-Persian subsets.

The Persian language, as well as other aspects of Persian society, enjoyed a special status in the Indian subcontinent, particularly among local Muslims. Persophilia is considered to have reached its peak under the Mughal Empire, where it was used in cultural and legal contexts, and so valued by Mughal ministers like Abdul Rahim Khan-i-Khanan, although the language later declined vis-à-vis English, which was asserted throughout British India. However, it remained a popular choice for Indian Muslim poetry, alongside the Urdu language.

One of the most prominent contemporary Persophiles was the British Iranologist Edward Granville Browne, who participated in the Persian Constitutional Revolution in 1906.

The phenomenon of Persophilia has been explored by several Persian academics, such as Hamid Dabashi, who published Persophilia: Persian Culture on the Global Scene in 2015.

== Notable Persophiles ==
- Alexander the Great
- Pausanias the Regent
- Xenophon of Athens
- Ralph Waldo Emerson
- Johann Wolfgang von Goethe
- Georg Wilhelm Friedrich Hegel
- Edward FitzGerald
- Friedrich Nietzsche
- Mehmed Tahir Münif Pasha
- Muhammad Iqbal
- Arthur Upham Pope
- Howard Baskerville
- Richard Nelson Frye
- Peter Avery
- Coleman Barks
- John W. Limbert
- Garnik Asatrian
- Dick Davis
- Henry Corbin
- Hakim Bey

== See also ==
- Persianization
  - Persianate society
- Medism
