= Şafak =

Şafak is a word in Turkish meaning dawn. It is also used as a unisex given name and a surname. Notable people with the name include:

== People ==
=== Given name ===
- Şafak Edge (born 1992), Turkish basketball player
- Şafak Pavey (born 1976), Turkish politician
- Şafak Pekdemir (born 1988), Turkish actress
- Şafak Sezer (born 1970), Turkish actor

=== Middle name ===
- İfayet Şafak Çalıkuşu (born 2002), Turkish curler

=== Surname ===
- Elif Şafak (born 1971), Turkish writer
