= Stavridis =

Stavridis (Greek: Σταυρίδης) is a Greek family name with the etymological meaning "son of Stavros." The genitive case form Stavridou (Σταυρίδου) or Stavridi (Σταυρίδη) is applied to female name bearers. Notable people with this name include:

- Eleftherios Stavridis (1893–1966), Greek journalist and politician
- Eleni Stavridou (born 1973), Greek diver
- James G. Stavridis (born 1955), retired United States Navy admiral
- Minas Stavridis (1945–2025), Greek footballer
- Nikos Stavridis (1910–1987), Greek actor in film and theater
- Vasilios Stavridis (1925–2016), Greek theologian and university teacher
