= List of Persian loanwords in Turkish =

A great number of words of Persian origin have entered the Turkish language. The following is a list of a number of these loanwords.

Persian	Turkish (Turkish alphabet)	Persian (Perso-Latin alphabet)	Meaning and usage
آهسته	aheste	āhesteh	slow
آهنگین	ahenkli	ahangin	musical
آینه	ayna	Ayineh	mirror
استاد	usta, üstad	ostâd	master
آشنا	aşina	âšnâ	familiar
افسانه	efsane	afsâne	legend
ادعانامه	iddianame	eddeâ-nâme	indictment
امید	ümit	omid	hope
بادجا	baca	bâdjâ	chimney
بادآورده	bedava	bâd âvarde	free (money)
بازار	pazar	bâzâr	market, marketplace
باغچه	bahçe	bâqče	garden
تاج	taç	tâj	crown
جان	can	jân	life, soul
چوپان	çoban	čupân	shepherd
مژده	müjde	možde	good news
میخانه	meyhane	meyxâne	tavern
شکنجه	işkence	šekanje	torture
نماز	namaz	namâz	salah
فریاد	feryat	faryâd	bellow
یار	yar	yâr	beloved
هر	her	har	every
هرکس	herkes	harkas	everyone
هیچ	hiç	hič	any, non
سبزی	sebze	sabzi	vegetable
میوه	meyve	mive	fruit
قرمز	kırmızı	qermez	red
پنیر	peynir	panir	cheese
قهرمان	kahraman	qahremân	hero
رنگ	renk	rang	colour
دیگر	diğer	digar	other
آرزو	arzu	ârezu	wish
جگر	ciğer	jegar	liver
برنج	pirinç	berenj	rice

== See also ==
- List of replaced loanwords in Turkish
