= Mehmed Tahir Münif Pasha =

Mehmed Tahir Münir Pasha
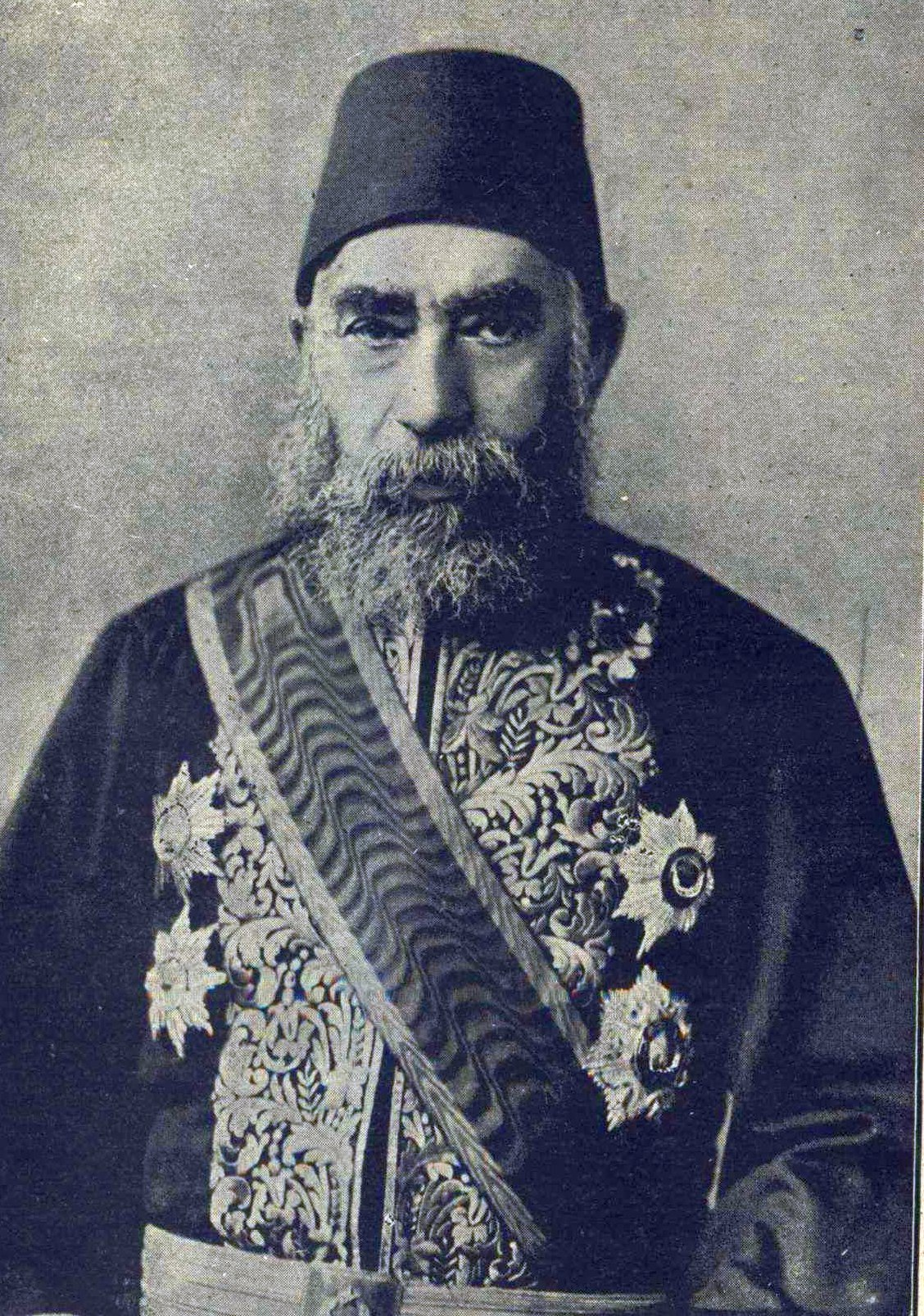
- Munif Pasha, 28 December 1909

Ottoman ambassador to Qajar Iran
- In office 1872–1877
- Monarchs: Abdulaziz; Murad V Abdul Hamid II
- In office 1896–1897
- Monarch: Abdul Hamid II

Personal details
- Born: 1828
- Died: 1910 (aged 81–82)

Mehmed Tahir Münif Pasha (1828-1910) was an Ottoman writer and statesman. A veteran official, he served thrice as Minister of Education (1877; 1878–1880 and 1885–1891) and twice as ambassador to Qajar Iran (1872–1877, and 1896–1897). During his first ambassadorship to Iran, he was awarded the Order of the Lion and the Sun medal. He also served as a trusted advisor to Sultan Abdul Hamid II, until he fell out of grace.

He was responsible for establishing the Cemiyet-i İlmiye-i Osmaniye ("The Ottoman Scientific Society") and Mecmūa-i Fünūn ("Science Journal").

Münif Pasha was a Persophile and had long-standing involvement interacting with Iranian statesmen. Unlike most of his fellow Ottoman statesmen at the time, Münif strongly advocated for upholding closer relations with the Ottoman Empire's eastern neighbors, including Iran. However, although Münif Pasha admired Iranian culture and history and was interested in these subjects, during his first ambassadorship in the 1870s he also experienced what he described as "unparalleled backwardness" in Qajar Iran, referring to the misrule and poverty he saw.
