= Atatürk's reforms =

Radical reforms that created the Turkish nation state

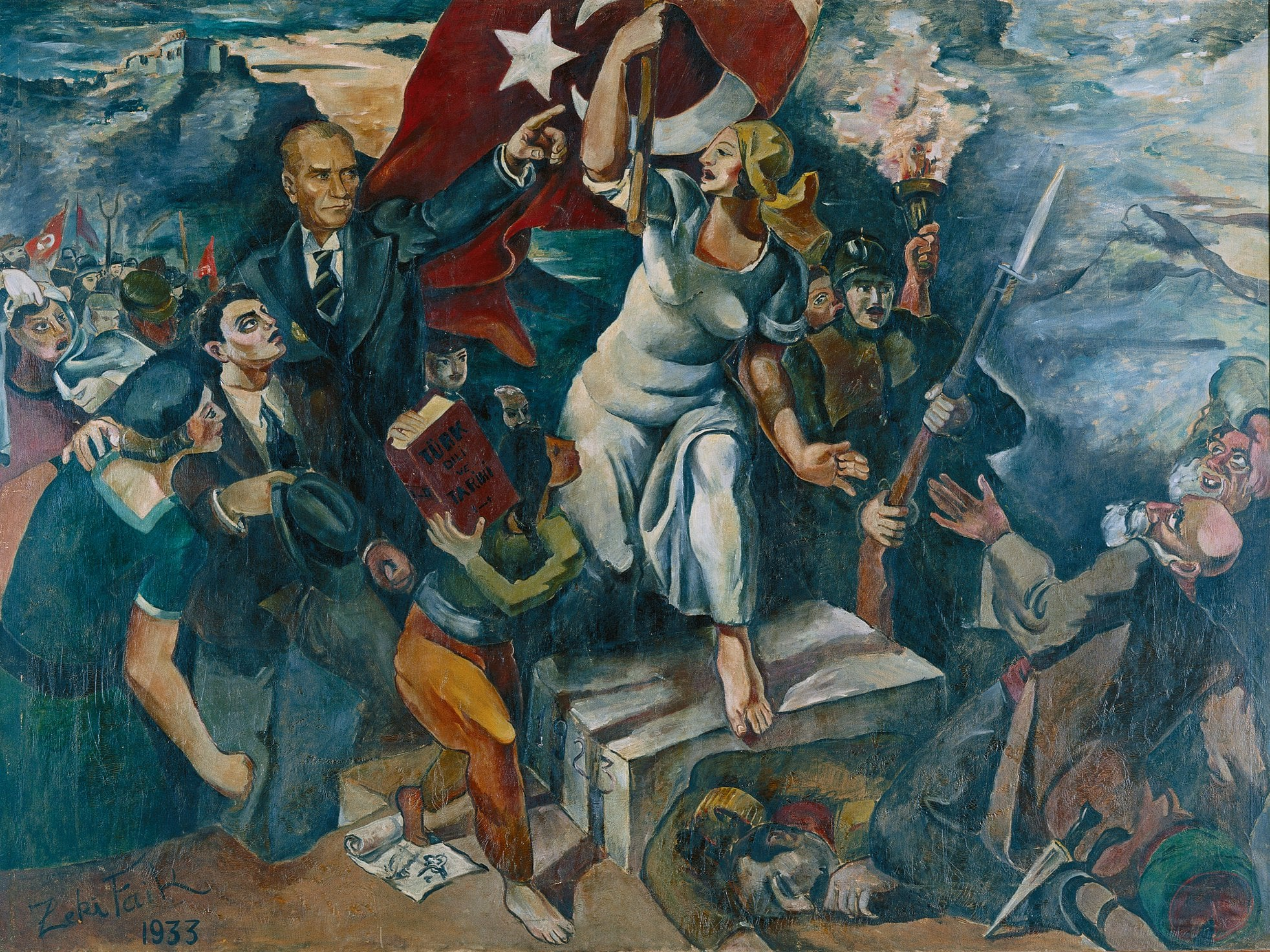
On the Path to Revolution symbolizes the Turkish woman as the pioneer of liberties.

Atatürk's reforms (Turkish: Atatürk İnkılapları or Atatürk Devrimleri, 'Atatürk's Revolution'), also referred to as the Turkish Revolution (Türk Devrimi), were a series of political, legal, religious, cultural, social, and economic policy changes, designed to transform the new Republic of Turkey into a secular, modern nation-state, implemented under the leadership of Mustafa Kemal Atatürk in accordance with the Kemalist framework. The principal political entity, the Republican People's Party (CHP), ruled Turkey as a one-party state from 1923 to 1945, apart from short-lived attempts to establish opposition parties.

Following Atatürk's death in 1938, his successor İsmet İnönü took over the leadership and integrated further Kemalist reforms. İnönü's work was, however, stranded by World War II. The CHP eventually lost the elections to the Democratic Party in 1950, bringing the one-party period to an end.

Central to the reforms was the belief that Turkish society had to modernize, which meant implementing widespread reform affecting not only politics, but the economic, social, educational, and legal spheres of Turkish society. The reforms involved a number of fundamental institutional changes that brought an end to many traditions, and followed a carefully planned program to unravel the complex system that had developed over previous centuries.

The reforms began with the modernization of the constitution, including enacting the new Constitution of 1924 to replace the Constitution of 1921, and the adaptation of European laws and jurisprudence to the needs of the new republic. This was followed by a thorough secularization and modernization of the administration, with a particular focus on the education system. The literacy rate within the Republic of Turkey, rose from 9% to 33% in only 10 years.

The political reforms developed in stages. By 1928, the constitutional reference to Islam as the state religion had been removed, and the new republic adopted the principle of secular government. Sovereignty formally rested with the Turkish nation and was exercised through the Grand National Assembly of Turkey. In practice, however, political power remained with the Republican People's Party during the one-party period, and opposition to the government was restricted. The reforms established the legal and administrative framework of a unitary nation-state, while their democratic and social character has remained a subject of debate.

Historically, Atatürk's reforms followed the Tanzimat ("reorganization") period of the Ottoman Empire, which began in 1839, the reforms in education and administration carried out under Abdul Hamid II, and the attempts at secularization and modernization under the Young Turks and the Committee of Union and Progress. Historians including Erik-Jan Zürcher and Şerif Mardin have emphasized the continuities between the Ottoman reform movement and the early Republic, rather than treating 1923 as the beginning of Turkish modernization.

Historians differ on how far these changes transformed society, with some regarding the Kemalist reforms as a continuation of the Young Turk movement rather than a social revolution, and arguing that they failed to reach much of rural Turkey, where most of the population lived. Others criticize the "reforms" arguing that the one-party regime developed in an authoritarian, and potentially totalitarian, direction from the outset, questioning the democratic and secular reputation of Kemalism and noting its corporatist conception of state and society.

== Goals ==
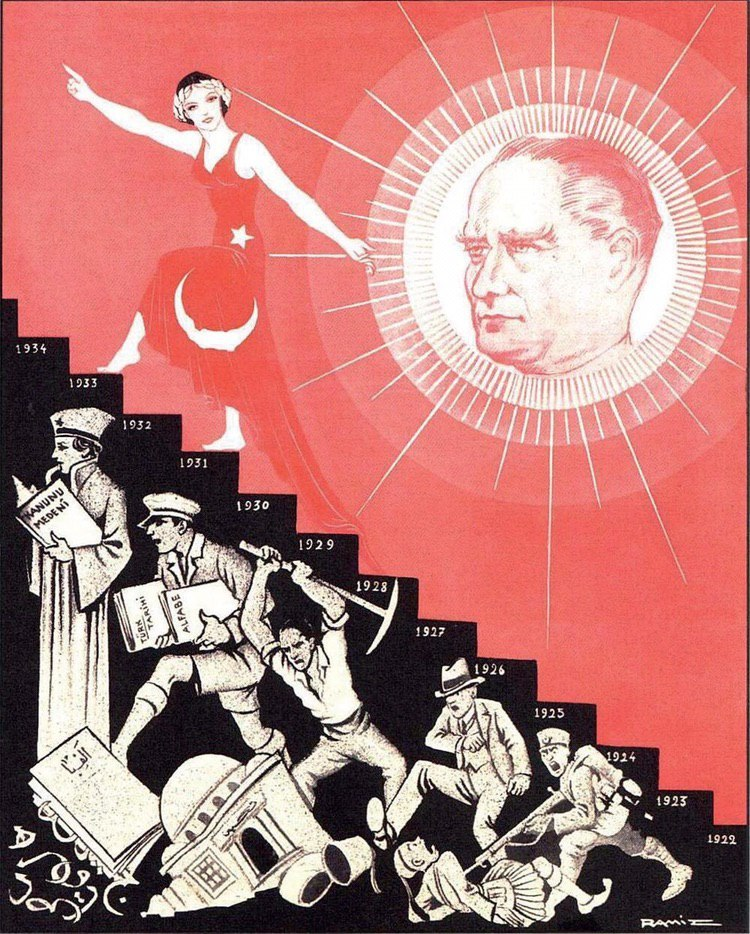
A propaganda poster describing the Turkish Revolution, from right to left: Victory against the Greek occupation, the Hat Revolution, the abolition of Sufi orders, the Alphabet Revolution, and the Turkish civil code.

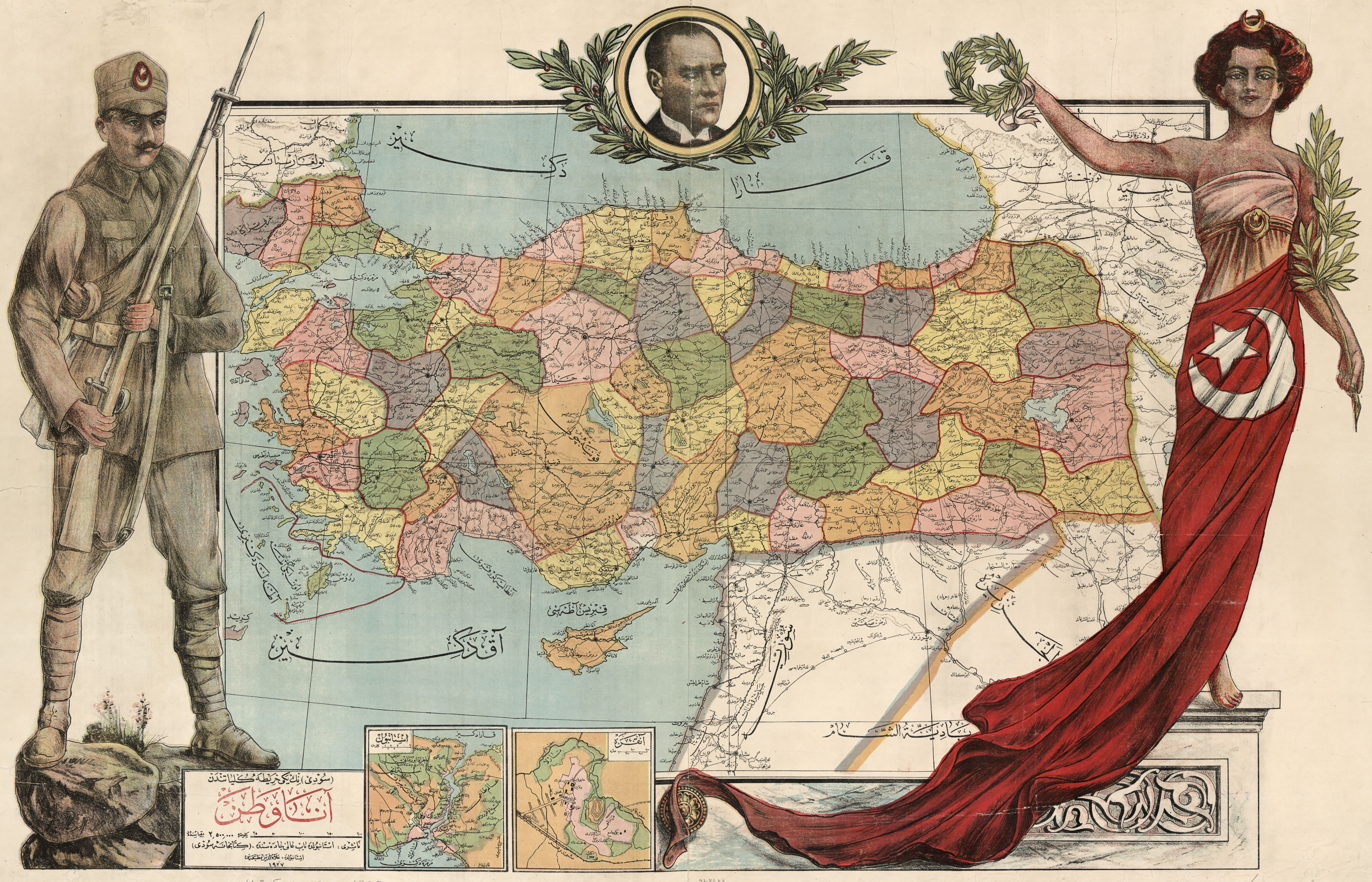
Map of Turkey in 1927 which was published before the alphabet reform

=== National unity ===
The goal of Atatürk's reforms was to maintain the independence of Turkey from the direct rule of external forces (Allies of World War I). Atatürk united much of the Turkish Muslim population from 1919 to 1922 in the Turkish War of Independence, and expelled foreign forces occupying what the Turkish National Movement considered to be the Turkish homeland. That fighting spirit became the unifying force which established the identity of a new state, and in 1923, the Treaty of Lausanne was signed, ending the Ottoman Empire and internationally recognizing the newly founded Republic of Turkey. From 1923 to 1938, a series of radical political and social reforms were instituted. They transformed the legal and political institutions of Turkey, including the expansion of civil and political rights for women. The reforms also aimed at establishing a common national identity, although their treatment of ethnic and religious minorities has been the subject of criticism.

=== Turkification and national identity ===
The reforms also sought to create a common Turkish national identity. In Eastern Anatolia, however, this policy involved the suppression of other languages and identities. Historian Uğur Ümit Üngör argues that the Young Turk and Kemalist governments used education and cultural policies to impose Turkish identity on the Kurdish population. In his study of a boarding school for Kurdish girls, he found that the principal objective was forced assimilation rather than education, and that coercion produced resistance to these policies.

One aspect of the nationalization policy was the pressure exerted on citizens who did not speak Turkish. The "Citizen, Speak Turkish!" campaign encouraged the use of Turkish in public and was supported not only by official policy but by nationalist groups and individuals. Senem Aslan argues that the campaign shows how Turkification was carried out by social organizations as well as the state.

The new national identity was not always understood in civic terms. Nazan Maksudyan, studying the Turkish Review of Anthropology between 1925 and 1939, found that the concept of Turkish nationality also contained a racial component. She argues that physical anthropology was used to support a nationalist conception in which the supposed "Turkish race" occupied a dominant position.

The same policies could also involve forced population movements. The Settlement Law of 1934 provided for the resettlement of populations considered insufficiently Turkish. Historian Pınar Dinç describes the intended evacuation of Dersim and the forced assimilation of non-Turkish communities as part of the Republic's policies in the region. These were followed by the military operations and mass killings of 1937–1938, which Dinç characterizes as genocide.

=== Reformation of Islam ===
Historian Rossella Bottoni argues that many secularizing reforms associated with Atatürk had precedents in the nineteenth-century Ottoman Empire, particularly in dress, education and the administration of justice. In her view, the main differences were the ideological character of Republican secularism and the way the new laws were prepared and implemented.

The Ottoman Empire was an Islamic state in which the head of the state, the Sultan, also held the position of Caliph. The social system was organized around the millet structure. The millet structure allowed a great degree of religious, cultural, and ethnic continuity across the society, but at the same time permitted the religious ideology to be incorporated into the administrative, economic, and political system.

There were two sections of the elite group at the helm of the discussions for the future. These were the "Islamist reformists" and the "Westernists". Many basic goals were common to both groups. Some secular intellectuals, and even certain reform-minded Muslim thinkers, accepted the view that social progress in Europe had followed the Protestant Reformation, as expressed in François Guizot's Histoire de la civilisation en Europe (1828). The reform-minded Muslim thinkers concluded from the Lutheran experience that the reform of Islam was imperative. Abdullah Cevdet, İsmail Fenni Ertuğrul, and Kılıçzâde İsmail Hakkı (İsmail Hakkı Kılıçoğlu), who were Westernist thinkers, took their inspiration rather from the subsequent marginalization of religion in European societies. To them, a reformed religion had only a temporary role to play as an instrument for the modernization of society, after which it would be cast aside from public life and limited to personal life.

=== Modernization ===
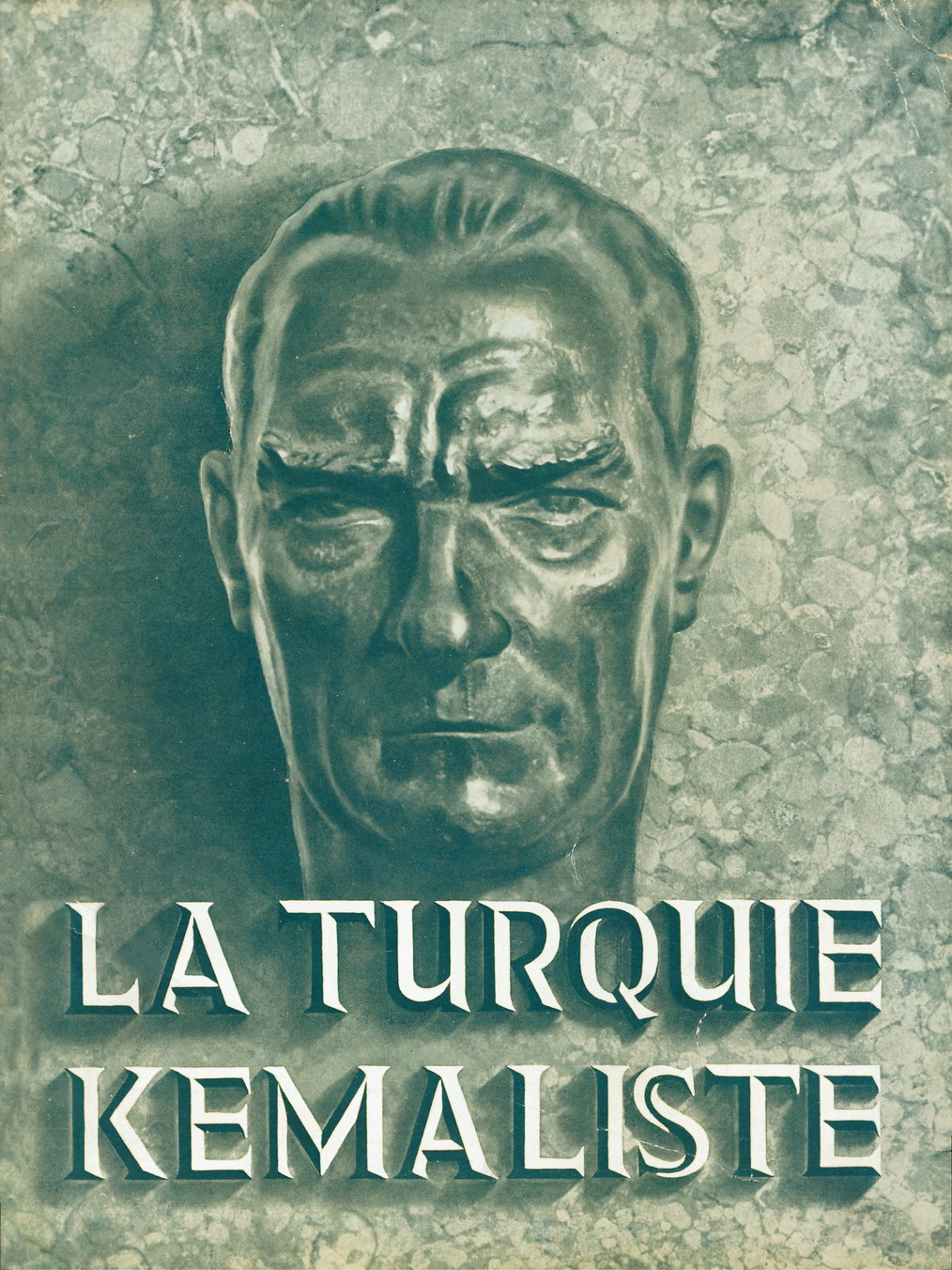
La Turquie Kemaliste (1933–1949) was a public diplomacy campaign to promote Turkey and Kemalism into European audiences.

The Young Turks and other Ottoman intellectuals asked the question of the position of the empire regarding the West (primarily taken to mean Christian Europe). The West represented intellectual and scientific ascendancy, and provided the blueprint for the ideal society of the future.

== Political reforms ==
=== Republicanism ===
Until the proclamation of the republic, the Ottoman Empire was still in existence, with its heritage of religious and dynastic authority. The Ottoman monarchy was abolished by the Ankara Government, but its traditions and cultural symbols remained active among the people (though less so among the elite).

On 1 November 1922, the Ottoman Sultanate was abolished by the Turkish Grand National Assembly and Sultan Mehmed VI departed the country. This allowed the Turkish nationalist government in Ankara to become the sole governing entity in the nation. The reforms formally transferred sovereignty from the Ottoman dynasty to the "Turkish nation", represented by the Grand National Assembly, although political competition remained restricted under one-party rule. The Republic of Turkey ("Türkiye Cumhuriyeti") was proclaimed on 29 October 1923, by the Turkish Grand National Assembly.

The Turkish Constitution of 1921 was the fundamental law of Turkey for a brief period. It was ratified by the Grand National Assembly of Turkey in the middle of the Turkish War of Independence. It was a simple document consisting of only 23 short articles. The major driving force behind the preparation of the 1921 Constitution was that its sovereignty derived from the nation and not from the Sultan, the absolute monarch of the Ottoman Empire. The 1921 Constitution also served as the legal basis for the Turkish War of Independence during 1919–1923, since it refuted the principles of the Treaty of Sèvres of 1918 signed by the Ottoman Empire, by which a great majority of the Empire's territory would have to be ceded to the Entente powers that had won the First World War. In October 1923 the constitution was amended to declare Turkey to be a republic.

In April 1924, the constitution was replaced by an entirely new document, the Turkish Constitution of 1924.

=== One-party rule and opposition ===
The proclamation of the Republic did not lead to sustained multi-party government. The Progressive Republican Party was established in 1924 but was banned in June 1925, following the suppression of the Sheikh Said rebellion. The Law on the Maintenance of Order and the Independence Tribunals were used against the government's political opponents and the critical press. Adanır argues that the Kurdish revolt gave the government the opportunity to suppress opposition outside the affected regions as well.

Opposition to some of the cultural reforms was also prosecuted. According to Adanır, around 50 people were sentenced to death between November 1925 and February 1926 in connection with protests against the compulsory introduction of Western-style hats. In his analysis of Atatürk's political outlook, Adanır further describes his style of rule as paternalistic, patriarchal, autocratic and elitist, arguing that neither Parliament nor the ruling party could act as an independent check on his authority.

=== Civic independence (popular sovereignty) ===
The establishment of popular sovereignty involved confronting centuries-old traditions. The reform process was characterized by a struggle between progressives and conservatives. The changes were both conceptually radical and culturally significant. In the Ottoman Empire, the people of each millet had traditionally enjoyed a degree of autonomy, with their own leadership, collecting their own taxes and living according to their own system of religious/cultural law. The Ottoman Muslims had a strict hierarchy of ulama, with the Sheikh ul-Islam holding the highest rank. A Sheikh ul-Islam was chosen by a royal warrant among the qadis of important cities. The Sheikh ul-Islam issued fatwas, which were written interpretations of the Quran that had authority over the community. The Sheikh ul-Islam represented the law of shariah. This office was in the Evkaf Ministry. Sultan Mehmed VI's cousin Abdulmecid II continued on as Ottoman Caliph.

Besides the political structure; as a part of civic independence, religious education system was replaced by a national education system on 3 March 1924, and The Islamic courts and Islamic canon law gave way to a secular law structure based on the Swiss Civil Code, which is detailed under their headings.

==== Abolition of Caliphate (1924) and Millet System ====
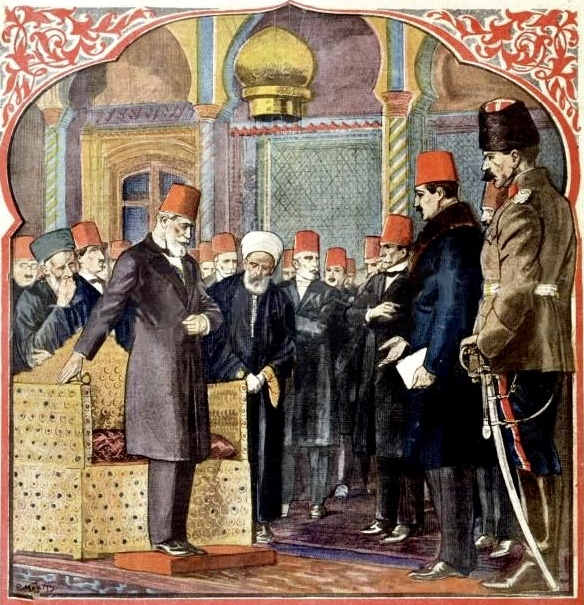
Abolition of the Caliphate, The Last Caliph, Le Petit Journal illustré, 16 March 1924

Reformers followed the European model (French model) of secularization. In the European model of secularizing; states typically involves granting individual religious freedoms, disestablishing state religions, stopping public funds to be used for a religion, freeing the legal system from religious control, freeing up the education system, tolerating citizens who change religion or abstain from religion, and allowing political leadership to come to power regardless of religious beliefs. In establishing a secular state, the Ottoman Caliphate, held by the Ottomans since 1517, was abolished and to mediate the power of religion in the public sphere (including recognized minority religions in the Treaty of Lausanne) left to the Directorate for Religious Affairs. Under the reforms official recognition of the Ottoman millets withdrawn. Shar’iyya wa Awqaf Ministry followed the Office of Caliphate. This office was replaced by the Presidency of Religious Affairs.

The abolishing of the position of Caliphate and Sheikh ul-Islam was followed by a common, secular authority. Many of the religious communities failed to adjust to the new regime. This was exacerbated by emigration or impoverishment, due to deteriorating economic conditions. Families that hitherto had financially supported religious community institutions such as hospitals and schools stop doing so.

==== Directorate for Religious Affairs ====
Atatürk's reforms define laïcité (as of 1935) as permeating both the government and the religious sphere. Minority religions, like the Armenian or Greek Orthodoxy are guaranteed protection by the constitution as individual faiths (personal sphere), but this guarantee does not give any rights to any religious communities (social sphere). (This differentiation applies to Islam and Muslims as well. Atatürk's reforms, as of 1935, assume the social sphere is secular.) The Treaty of Lausanne, the internationally binding agreement of the establishment of the Republic, does not specify any nationality or ethnicity. Treaty of Lausanne simply identifies non-Muslims in general and provides the legal framework which gives certain explicit religious rights to Jews, Greeks, and Armenians without naming them.

The Directorate of Religious Affairs (Diyanet) was an official state institution established in 1924 under article 136, which received the powers of the Shaykh al-Islam. As specified by law, the duties of the Diyanet are “to execute the works concerning the beliefs, worship, and ethics of Islam, enlighten the public about their religion, and administer the sacred worshiping places”. The Diyanet exercised state oversight over religious affairs and ensuring that people and communities did not challenge the Republic's "secular identity".

=== Public administration ===
==== New capital ====
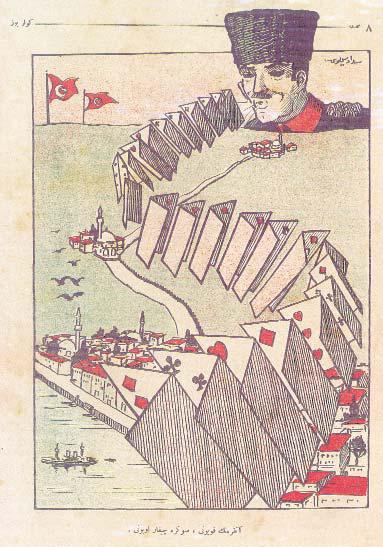
"The Sheep of Ankara, shows its hand last." by Sedat Simavi, in Istanbul magazine Güleryüz in October 1922

The reform movement chose Ankara as its new capital in 1923, as a rejection of the perceived corruption and decadence of cosmopolitan Istanbul and its Ottoman heritage, as well as electing to choose a capital more geographically centered in Turkey. During the disastrous 1912–13 First Balkan War, Bulgarian troops had advanced to Çatalca, mere miles from Istanbul, creating a fear that the Ottoman capital would have to be moved to Anatolia; the reform movement wanted to avoid a similar incident with Turkey.

==== Advances in the press ====
The Anadolu Agency was founded in 1920 during the Turkish War of Independence by Journalist Yunus Nadi Abalıoğlu and writer Halide Edip. The agency was officially launched on 6 April 1920, 17 days before the Turkish Grand National Assembly convened for the first time. It announced the first legislation passed by the Assembly, which established the Republic of Turkey.

However, Anadolu Agency acquired an autonomous status after Atatürk reformed the organizational structure to turn the Anadolu Agency into a Western news agency. This new administrative structure declared the "Anadolu Agency Corporation" on 1 March 1925. Anadolu Agency Corporation acquired an autonomous status with an unexampled organizational chart, something that did not even exist in the Western countries in those days.

==== Statistical and census information ====
Ottomans had censuses (1831 census, 1881–82 census, 1905–06 census, and 1914 census) performed, and financial information collected under Ottoman Bank for the purpose of payments on Ottoman public debt. One of the Atatürk's major achievement is the establishment of a principal government institution in charge of statistics (economic and financial statistical data) and census data.

Modern statistical services began with the establishment of The Central Statistical Department in 1926. It was established as a partially centralized system. Turkish Statistical Institute is the Turkish government agency commissioned with producing official statistics on Turkey, its population, resources, economy, society, and culture. It was founded in 1926 and has its headquarters in Ankara. In 1930, the title of the department was changed to The General Directorate of Statistics (GDS), and The National Statistical System was changed to a centralized system. In earlier years, statistical sources were relatively simple and data collection was confined to activities related to some of the relevant functions of the government with population censuses every five years, and with agriculture and industry censuses every ten years. Gradually the activities of the GDS widened in accordance with the increasing demand for new statistical data and statistics. In addition to those censuses and surveys, many continuous publications on economic, social and cultural subjects were published by this institute to provide necessary information.

1927 Census (First systematic census)

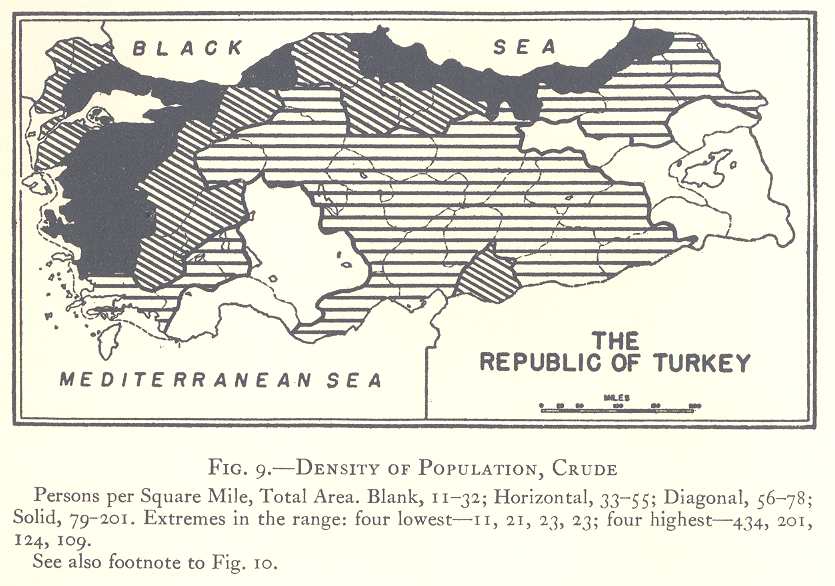
Population distribution

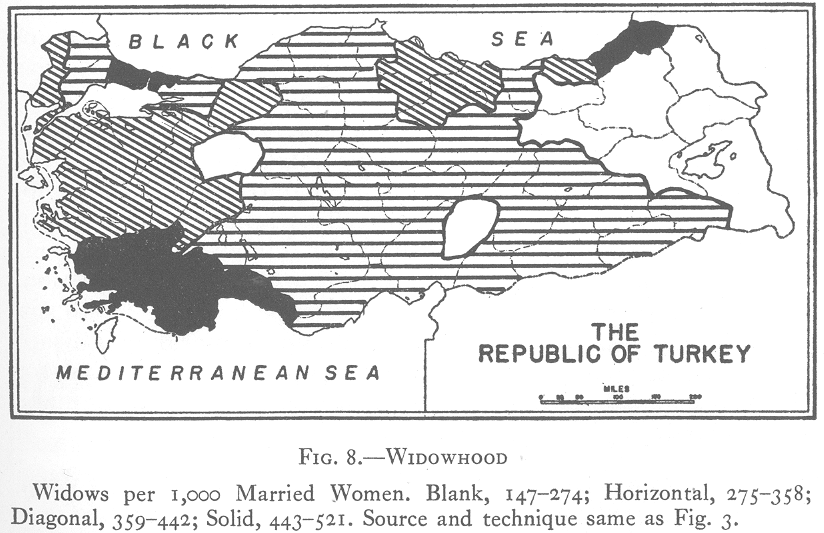
Widowhood

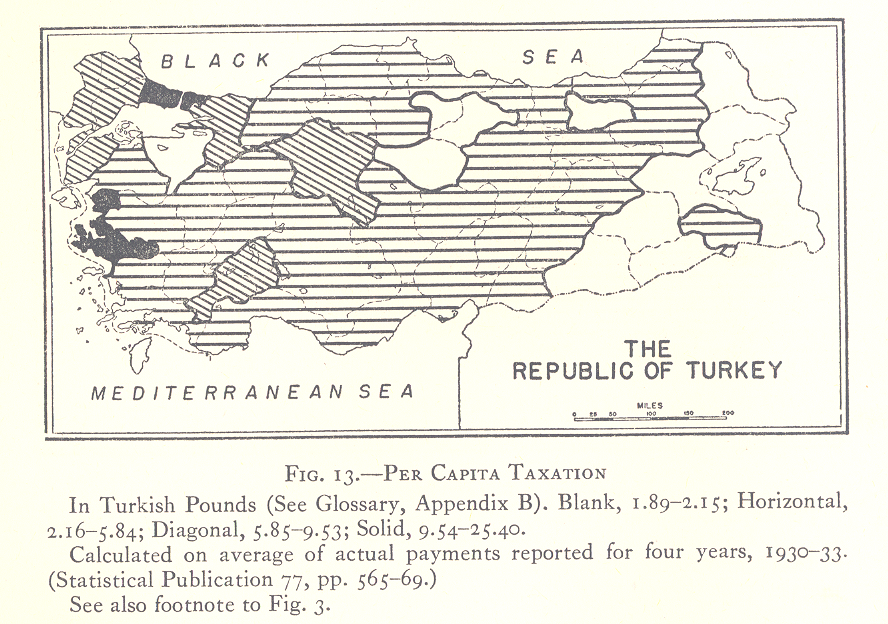
Taxation

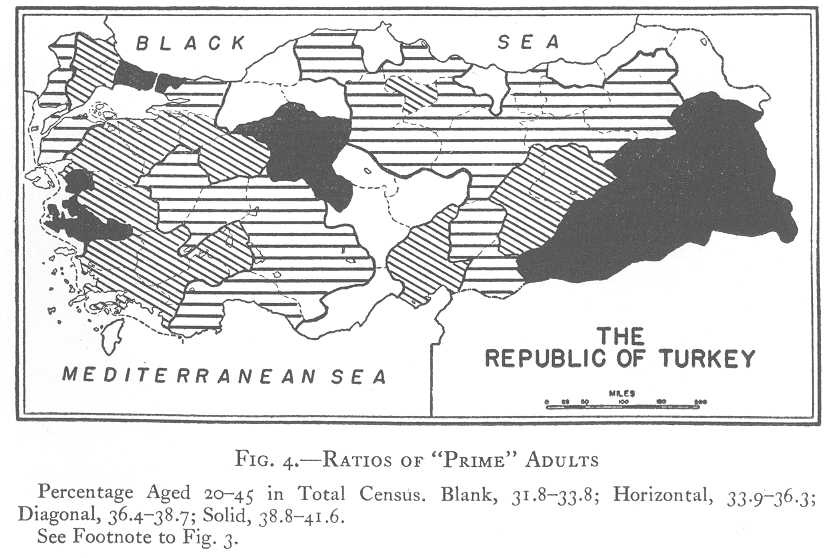
Adults (able to work)

== Social reforms ==
Some social institutions had religious overtones, and held considerable influence over public life. Social change also included centuries old religious social structures that has been deeply rooted within the society, some were established within the state organisation of the Ottoman Empire. The Kemalist reforms brought effective social change on women's suffrage.

=== Religious reform ===
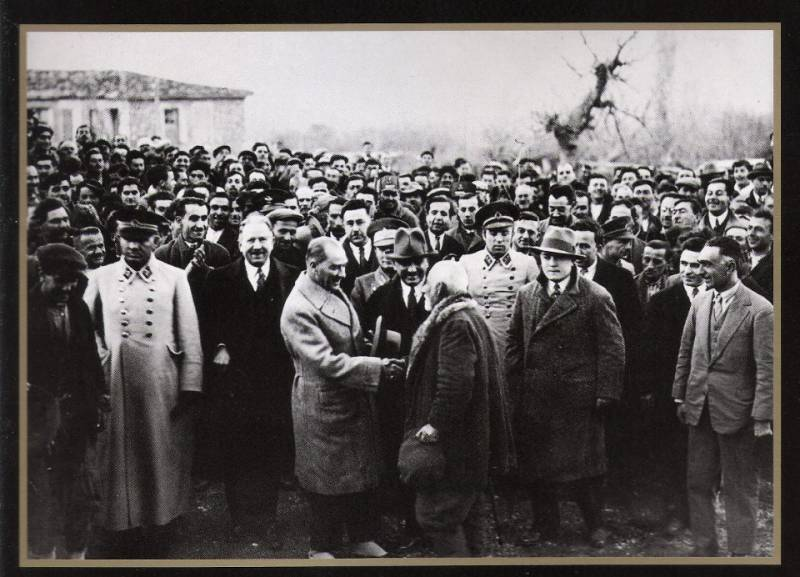
Atatürk speaking with a civilian in 1931

In the Ottoman public sphere religious groups exerted their power. The public sphere, can be defined an area in social life where individuals come together to freely discuss and identify societal problems, and through that discussion influence political action. It is "a discursive space in which individuals and groups congregate to discuss matters of mutual interest and, where possible, to reach a common judgment." Atatürk's Reforms target the structure of the public space. The construction of a secular nation-state required important changes in state organization, though Atatürk's reforms benefited from the elaborate blueprints for a future society prepared by the Ottoman proponents of positivism during the Second Constitutional Era.

Gavin D. Brockett disputes the usual account of the religious reforms as a conflict between secular progress and Islamic "reaction". In his view, this interpretation misrepresents Turkish history and rests on a flawed view of religion and society.

Umut Azak writes that Kemalist secularism did not mean that the state abandoned religion altogether. Instead, the regime sought to promote a reformed and nationalized "Turkish Islam", while maintaining a fear of religious "reaction" that continued to shape the official understanding of secularism.

==== Religious insignia ====
The imposition of Western-style clothing by the government was not new. Kaya İmrag traces the Ottoman drive for modernization to Selim III and the government's intervention in civilian clothing to Mahmud II, and describes the Republican dress reforms as a continuation of Ottoman modernization. In 1829, Mahmud II regulated the clothing of government officials and required the fez as part of the new dress. İmrag also notes that changes in headgear had been attempted under Abdülhamid II and the Young Turks. The Ottoman Empire had a social system based on religious affiliation. Religious insignia extended to every social function. It was common to wear clothing that identified the person with their own particular religious grouping and accompanied headgear which distinguished rank and profession throughout the Ottoman Empire. The turbans, fezes, bonnets and head-dresses surmounting Ottoman styles showed the sex, rank, and profession (both civil and military) of the wearer. These styles were accompanied with strict regulation beginning with the reign of Süleyman the Magnificent. Sultan Mahmud II followed on the example of Peter the Great in Russia in modernizing the Empire and used the dress code of 1826 which developed the symbols (classifications) of feudalism among the public. These reforms were achieved through introduction of the new customs by decrees, while banning the traditional customs. The view of their social change proposed that if the permanence of secularism was to be assured by removal of persistence of traditional cultural values (the religious insignia), a considerable degree of cultural receptivity by the public to the further social change could be achieved.

Atatürk's Reforms defined a non-civilized person as one who functioned within the boundaries of superstition. The ulema, according to this classification, was not befit for 'civilized' life, as many argued that they were acting according to superstitions developed throughout centuries. On 25 February 1925, parliament passed a law stating that religion was not to be used as a tool in politics. Kemalist ideology waged a war against superstition by banning the practices of the ulema and promoting the 'civilized' way ("Westernization"). The ban on the ulema's social existence came in the form of dress code. The strategic goal was to change the large influence of the ulema over politics by removing them from the social arena. However, there was the danger of being perceived as anti-religious. Kemalists defended themselves by stating "Islam viewed all forms of superstition (non-scientific) nonreligious". The ulema's power was established during the Ottoman Empire with the conception that secular institutions were all subordinate to religion; the ulema were emblems of religious piety, and therefore rendering them powerful over state affairs. Kemalists claimed:

The state will be ruled by positivism not superstition.

An example was the practice of medicine. Kemalists wanted to get rid of superstition extending to herbal medicine, potion, and religious therapy for mental illness, all of which were practiced by the ulema. They excoriated those who used herbal medicine, potions, and balms, and instituted penalties against the religious men who claimed they have a say in health and medicine. On 1 September 1925, the first Turkish Medical Congress was assembled, which was only four days after Mustafa Kemal was seen on 27 August at İnebolu wearing a modern hat and one day after the Kastamonu speech on 30 August.

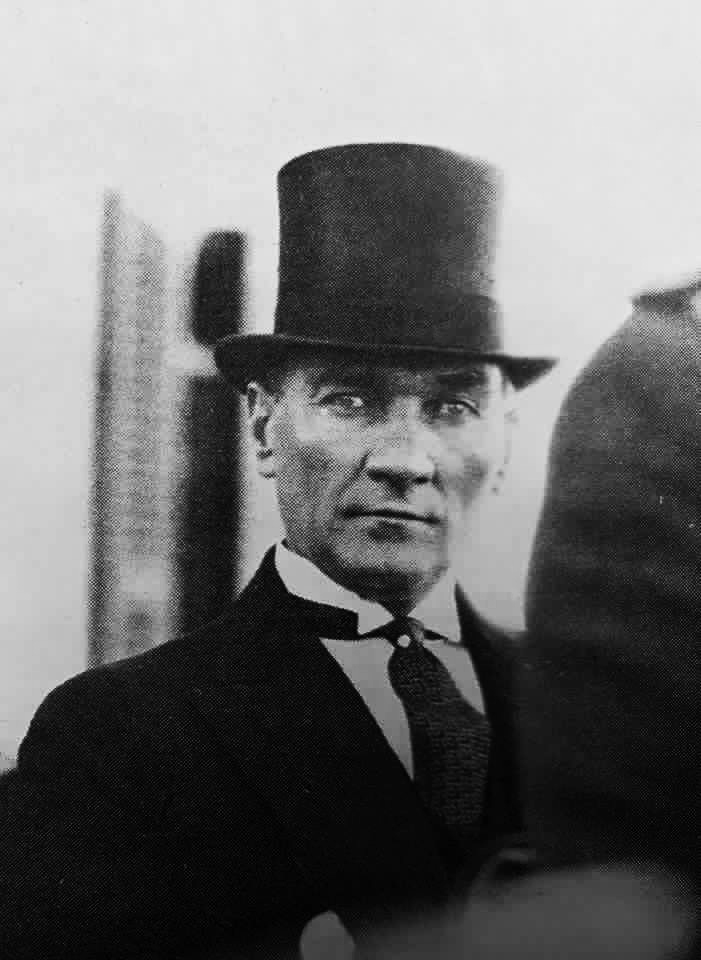
Atatürk with his top hat

Official measures were gradually introduced to eliminate the wearing of religious clothing and other overt signs of religious affiliation. Beginning in 1923, a series of laws progressively limited the wearing of selected items of traditional clothing. Mustafa Kemal first made the hat compulsory to the civil servants. The guidelines for the proper dressing of students and state employees (public space controlled by state) was passed during his lifetime. After most of the relatively better educated civil servants adopted the hat with their own he gradually moved further. On the 25 November 1925 the parliament passed the Hat Law which introduced the use of Western style hats instead of the fez. Legislation did not explicitly prohibit veils or headscarves and focused instead on banning fezzes and turbans for men. The law had also influence of school text books. Following the issuing of the Hat Law, images in school text books that had shown men with fezzes, were exchanged with images which showed men with hats. Another control on the dress was passed in 1934 with the law relating to the wearing of 'Prohibited Garments'. It banned religion-based clothing, such as the veil and turban, outside of places of worship, and gave the government the power to assign only one person per religion or sect to wear religious clothes outside of places of worship.

Signs of religious affiliation and clothing

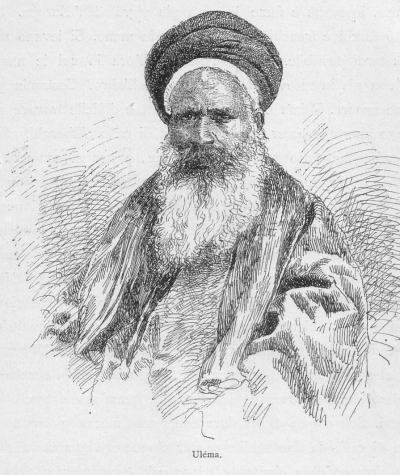
A member of the ulema, who was distinguished by his headgear, could not use it after the Hat Law of 1925

The Law Relating to Prohibited Garments of 1934 banned religion-based clothing for men in public. However, the government did not interfere with women's clothing, but some municipalities did ban the niqāb.

==== Religious texts, prayer, references ====
Translation of religious information

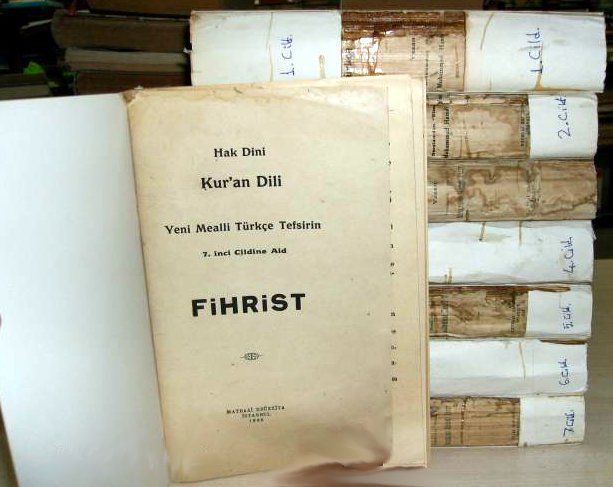
The original 1935 print of the first Quran in Turkish language, ordered by Atatürk

All printed Qurans in Turkey were in Classical Arabic (the sacred language of Islam) at the time. Translated Qurans existed in private settings. A major point of Atatürk's Reform was, according to his understanding; "...teaching religion in Turkish to Turkish people who had been practicing Islam without understanding it for centuries" Turkish translations published in Istanbul created controversy in 1924. Several renderings of the Quran in the Turkish language were read in front of the public. These Turkish Qurans were fiercely opposed by religious conservatives. This incident impelled many leading Muslim modernists to call upon the Turkish Parliament to sponsor a Quran translation of suitable quality. The Parliament approved the project and the Directorate of Religious Affairs enlisted Mehmet Akif Ersoy to compose a Quran translation and an Islamic scholar Elmalılı Hamdi Yazır to author a Turkish language Quranic commentary (tafsir) titled "Hak Dini Kur'an Dili." Ersoy declined the offer and destroyed his work, to avoid the possible public circulation of a transliteration which might be remotely faulty. Only in 1935 did the version read in public find its way to print.

The program also involved implementing a Turkish adhan, as opposed to the conventional Arabic call to prayer. The Arabic adhan was replaced with the following:

Tanrı uludur
Şüphesiz bilirim, bildiririm
Tanrı'dan başka yoktur tapacak.
Şüphesiz bilirim, bildiririm;
Tanrı'nın elçisidir Muhammed.
Haydin namaza, haydin felaha,
Namaz uykudan hayırlıdır.

Following the conclusion of said debates, the Diyanet released an official mandate on 18 July 1932 announcing the decision to all the mosques across Turkey, and the practice was continued for a period of 18 years. Following the victory of the Democrat Party in the country's first multi-party elections in 1950, a new government was sworn in, led by Adnan Menderes, which restored Arabic as the liturgical language.

The reformers dismissed the imam assigned to the Turkish Grand National Assembly, saying that prayer should be performed in a mosque, not in the parliament. They also removed the "references to religion" from the decorum. The only Friday sermon (khutba) ever delivered by a Turkish head of state was given by Atatürk; this took place at a mosque in Balıkesir during the election campaign. The reformers said that "to repeat the sermons [by a politician in the parliament] of a thousand years ago was to preserve backwardness and promote nescience."

==== Religious organizations ====
Eliminating religious "associations" from political arena

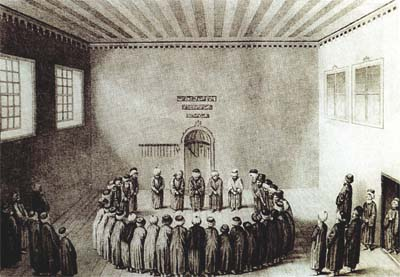
The Sufi orders—congregations formed around a master—which meet for majalis, in meeting places known as tekke

The abolishment of Caliphate removed the highest religious-political position. This act left Muslim associations who were institutionalized under the convents and the dervish lodges without higher organizing structure.

The reformers assumed that the original sources, now available in Turkish, would render the orthodox religious establishment (the ‘ulamā’) and the Ṣūfī ṭarīqas obsolete, and thus help to privatize religion as well as produce a reformed Islam. In 1925 institutions of religious covenants and dervish lodges were declared illegal.

The reformers imagined that the elimination of the orthodox and Ṣūfī religious establishments, along with traditional religious education, and their replacement with a system in which the original sources were available to all in the vernacular language, would pave the way for a new vision of Islam open to progress and modernity and usher in a society guided by modernity.

Along with the multi-party period, with Democrats both taking part and winning for the first time in the 1950 Turkish general election, religious establishments started becoming more active in the country.

==== Religious holiday (Work week) ====
Turkey adapted the European workweek and weekend as the complementary parts of the week devoted to labor and rest, respectively. In the Ottoman Empire, the workweek was from Sunday to Thursday and the weekend was Friday and Saturday.

A law enacted in 1935 changed the weekend, which now began Friday afternoon (not Thursday afternoon) and ended on Sunday.

=== Women's rights ===
During a meeting in the early days of the new republic, Atatürk proclaimed:

To the women: Win for us the battle of education and you will do yet more for your country than we have been able to do. It is to you that I appeal.
To the men: If henceforward the women do not share in the social life of the nation, we shall never attain to our full development. We shall remain irremediably backward, incapable of treating on equal terms with the civilizations of the West.

In the following years of Atatürk's Reforms women's rights campaigners in Turkey differed from their sisters (and sympathetic brothers) in other countries. Rather than fighting directly for their basic rights and equality, they saw their best chance in the promotion and maintenance of Atatürk's Reforms, with its espousal of secular values and equality for all, including women.

==== Equal participation ====
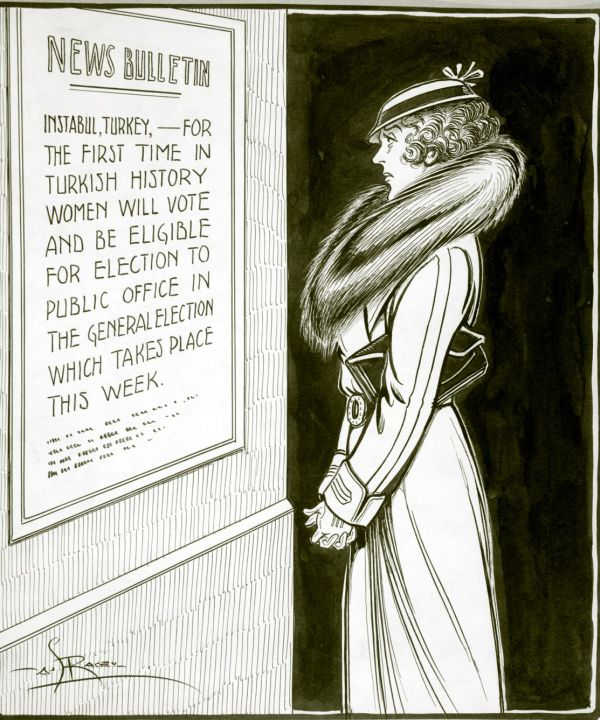
Canadian political cartoon of a woman in Quebec reading a sign that reads: "News bulletin: for the first time in Turkish history women will vote and be eligible to the public office in the general election which takes place this week." Women were granted the right to vote in Turkey in 1930, but the right to vote was not extended to women in provincial elections in Quebec until 1940.

In Ottoman society, women had no political rights, even after the Second Constitutional Era in 1908. During the early years of the Turkish Republic educated women struggled for political rights. One notable female political activist was Nezihe Muhittin who founded the first women's party in June 1923, which however was not legalized because the Republic was not officially declared.

With intense struggle, Turkish women achieved voting rights in local elections by the act of 1580 on 3 April 1930. Four years later, through legislation enacted on 5 December 1934, they gained full universal suffrage, earlier than most other countries. The reforms in the Turkish civil code, including those affecting women's suffrage, were "breakthroughs not only within the Islamic world but also in the w Western world".

In 1935, in the general elections Eighteen female MPs joined the parliament, at a time when women in a significant number of other European countries had no voting rights.

Deniz Kandiyoti argued that the legal changes did not necessarily bring about the liberation of women in their social and family lives, despite the new rights granted by the Republic.

==== Equality of the sexes ====
Beginning with the adoption of the Turkish Civil Code in 1926, a modified Swiss Penal Code, women gained extensive civil rights. This continued with women gaining the right to vote and stand for elections at the municipal and federal levels in 1930 and 1934, respectively. Various other legal initiatives were also put into effect in the years following to encourage equality.

The Turkish Civil Code also allowed equal rights to divorce to both men and women, and gave equal child custody rights to both parents.

Polygamy was permitted in the Ottoman Empire under special circumstances, with certain terms and conditions. Atatürk's reforms made polygamy illegal, and became the only nation located in the Middle East that had abolished polygamy, which was officially criminalized with the adoption of the Turkish Civil Code in 1926, a milestone in Atatürk's reforms. Penalties for illegal polygamy was set up to be 2 years imprisonment.

Under Islamic law, a woman's inheritance was half the share of a man, whereas under the new laws man and women inherited equally.

Besides the advancements, men were still officially heads of the household in the law. Women needed the head of the household's permission to travel abroad.

Atatürk's Reforms aimed to break the traditional role of the women in the society. Women were encouraged to attend universities and obtain professional degrees. Women soon became teachers at coed schools, engineers, and studied medicine and law. Between 1920 and 1938, ten percent of all university graduates were women.

In 1930, the first female judges were appointed.

==== Women's role models ====
Atatürk's regime promoted female role models who were, in his words, "the mothers of the nation." This woman of the republic was 'cultured, educated, and modern'; to promote this image, the Miss Turkey pageants were first organized in 1929.

Women's role models

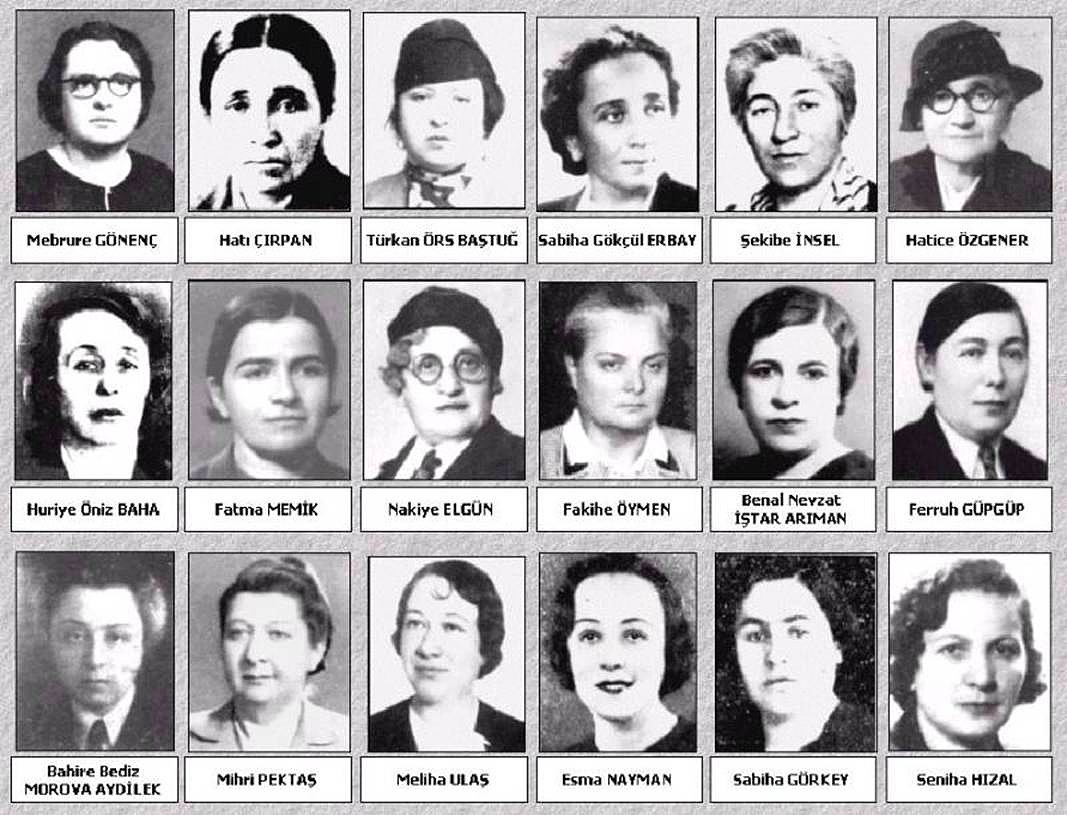
Eighteen female MPs, 1935 general elections

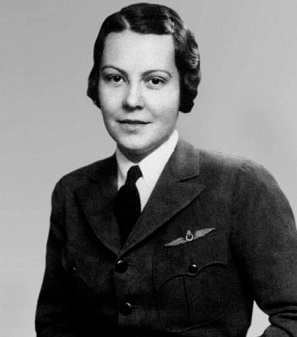
Sabiha Gökçen, first female fighter pilot in personalized uniform ordered by Atatürk

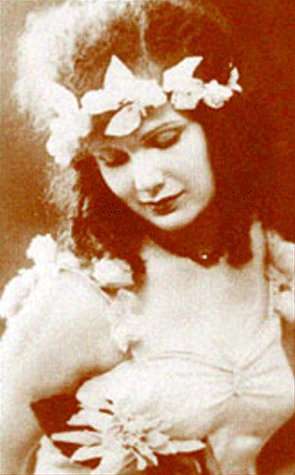
Feriha Tevfik, first ever Miss Turkey, 1929

=== Social structure ===
==== Personal names ====
Under the Ottoman Empire many people, especially Muslims, did not use surnames. The Surname Law was adopted on 21 June 1934. The law requires all citizens of Turkey to adopt the use of hereditary, fixed, surnames. Much of the population, particularly in the cities as well as Turkey's Christian and Jewish citizens, already had surnames, and all families had names by which they were known locally.

==== Measurement (Calendar, time, and the metric system) ====
The reform of calendars, working hours and public holidays also had an Ottoman background. François Georgeon traces measures to regulate public time from the Tanzimat reforms of 1840 to the Republican legislation of 1925, treating them as part of a longer process of state modernization. The clocks, calendars and measures used in the Ottoman Empire were different from those used in the European states. This made social, commercial and official relations difficult and caused considerable confusion. In the last period of the Ottoman Empire, some studies were made to eliminate this difference.

First, a law enacted on 26 December 1925 and banned the use of Hijri and Rumi calendars. Turkey began to use Gregorian calendar officially on 1 January 1926. One calendar prevented the complications of multiple calendars in state affairs.

The clock system used by the contemporary world was accepted instead of the Turkish 'sunset clock'. With the time scale taken from the West, one day was divided into 24 hours and daily life was organized accordingly.

With a change made in 1928, international figures were adopted. A law adopted in 1931 changed the old weight and length measurements. Previously used measurement units such as arshin, endaze, okka have been removed. Instead, meters were accepted as length measurements and kilograms as weight measures. With these changes in length and weight measurements, unity was achieved in the country.

==== Fine art drive ====
The fundamental changes within the regime and the society were supplemented with a series of cultural reforms, in an attempt to embrace a national identity. Countering the customs practiced over the previous centuries by which the architecture was inspired by Islamic values, the emerging first national architectural movement was promoted by the Turkish government. Many structures over the country, especially in Ankara, Turkey's new capital under construction, were built to reflect distinct characteristics of the Turkish culture, a blend of Anatolian Seljuk and Ottoman heritage.

With an influx of many public institutions being moved from Istanbul, to the new capital, Ankara, Mustafa Kemal Atatürk paid an attention on the course of transforming the city into a planned metropolitan area. In 1928, the central government established a dedicated body, the City of Ankara Directorate of Construction. Invited to Turkey, urban planner Hermann Jansen arranged a layout that determines the spatial development plan for Ankara. Henri Prost was appointed with similar plans to reconstruct Istanbul. However, the efforts were stranded with the struggles of World War II.

First national architectural movement

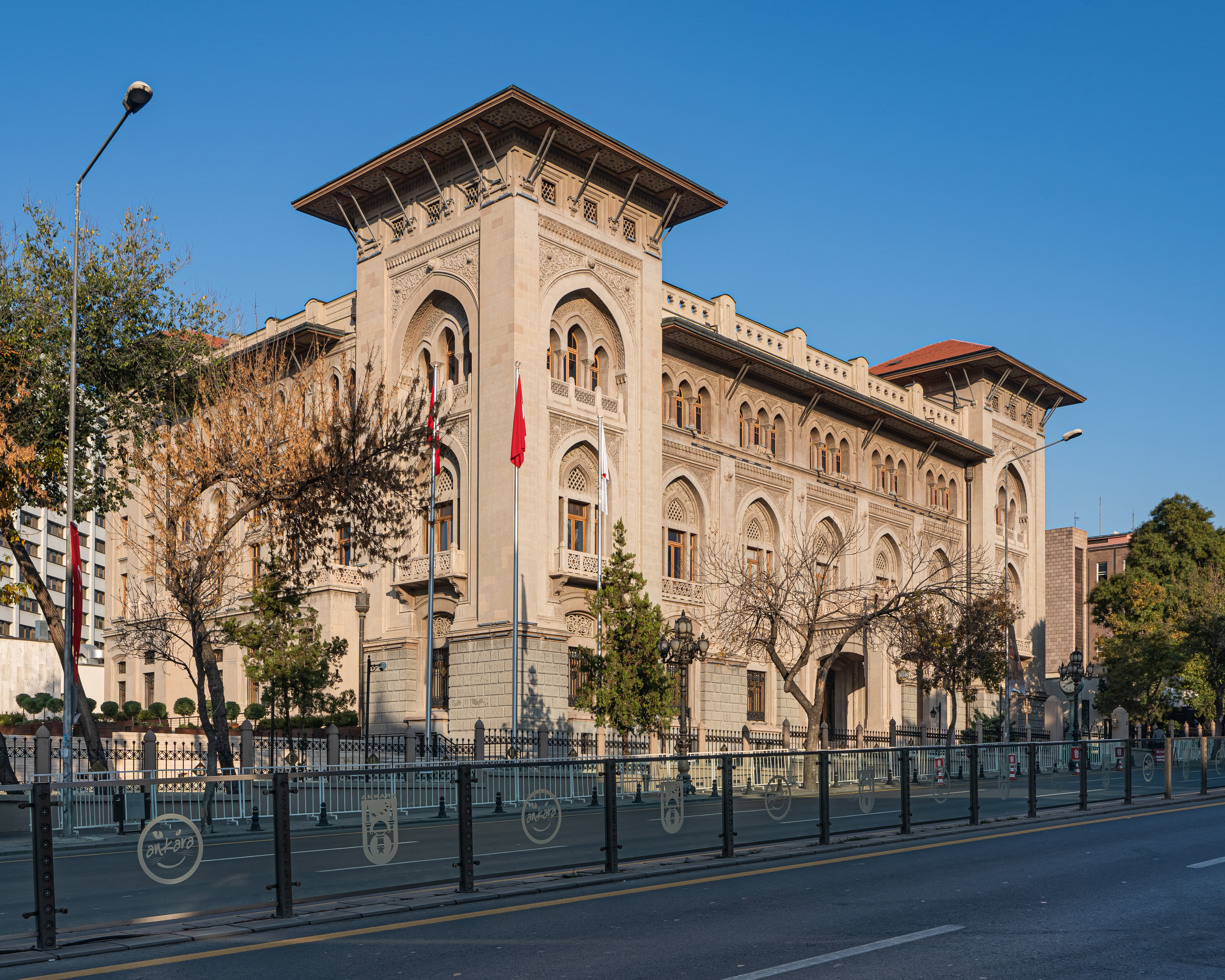
Former Ziraat Bankası headquarters, built in 1929

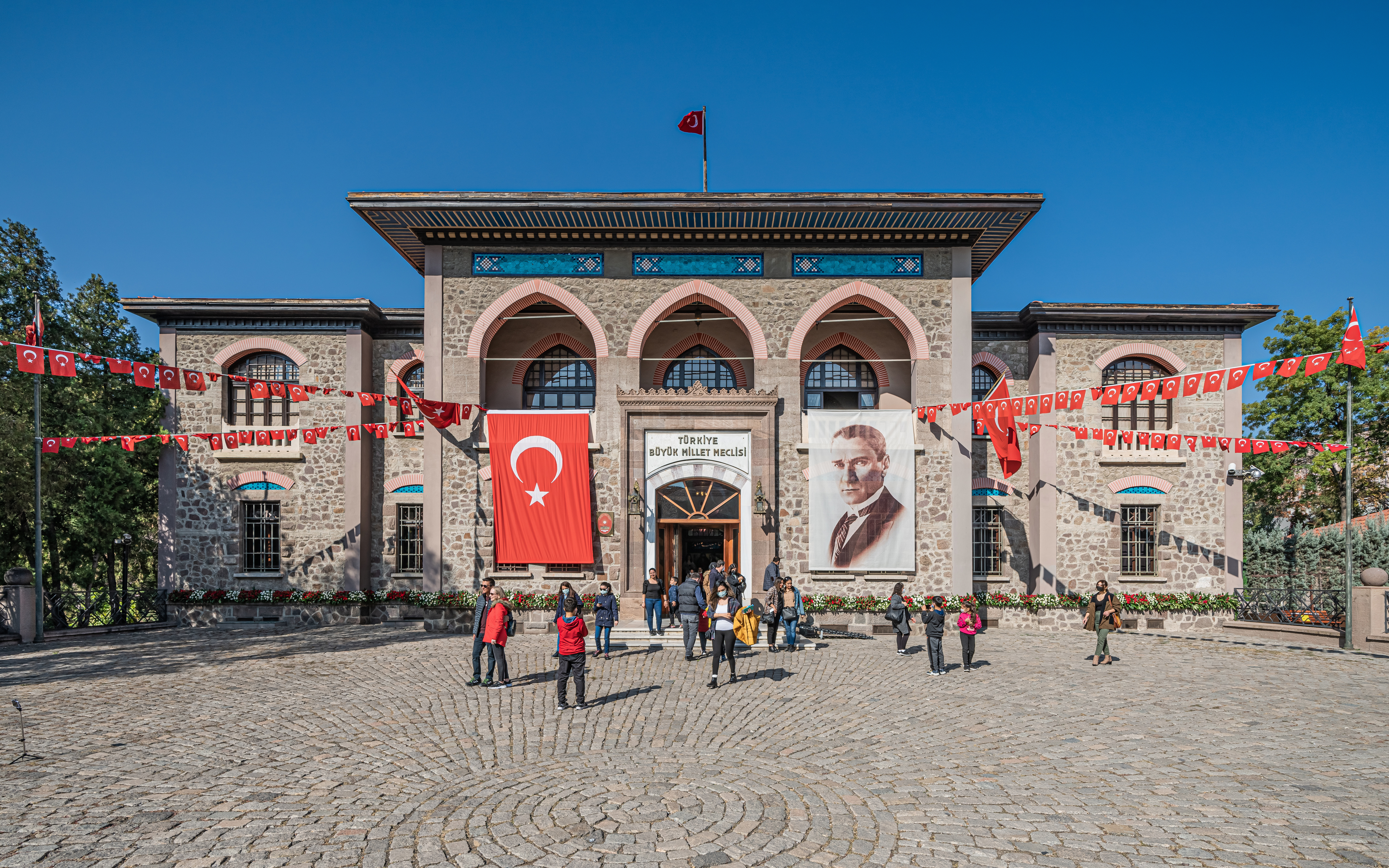
Republic Museum, formerly used as the Turkish Parliament, built in 1924

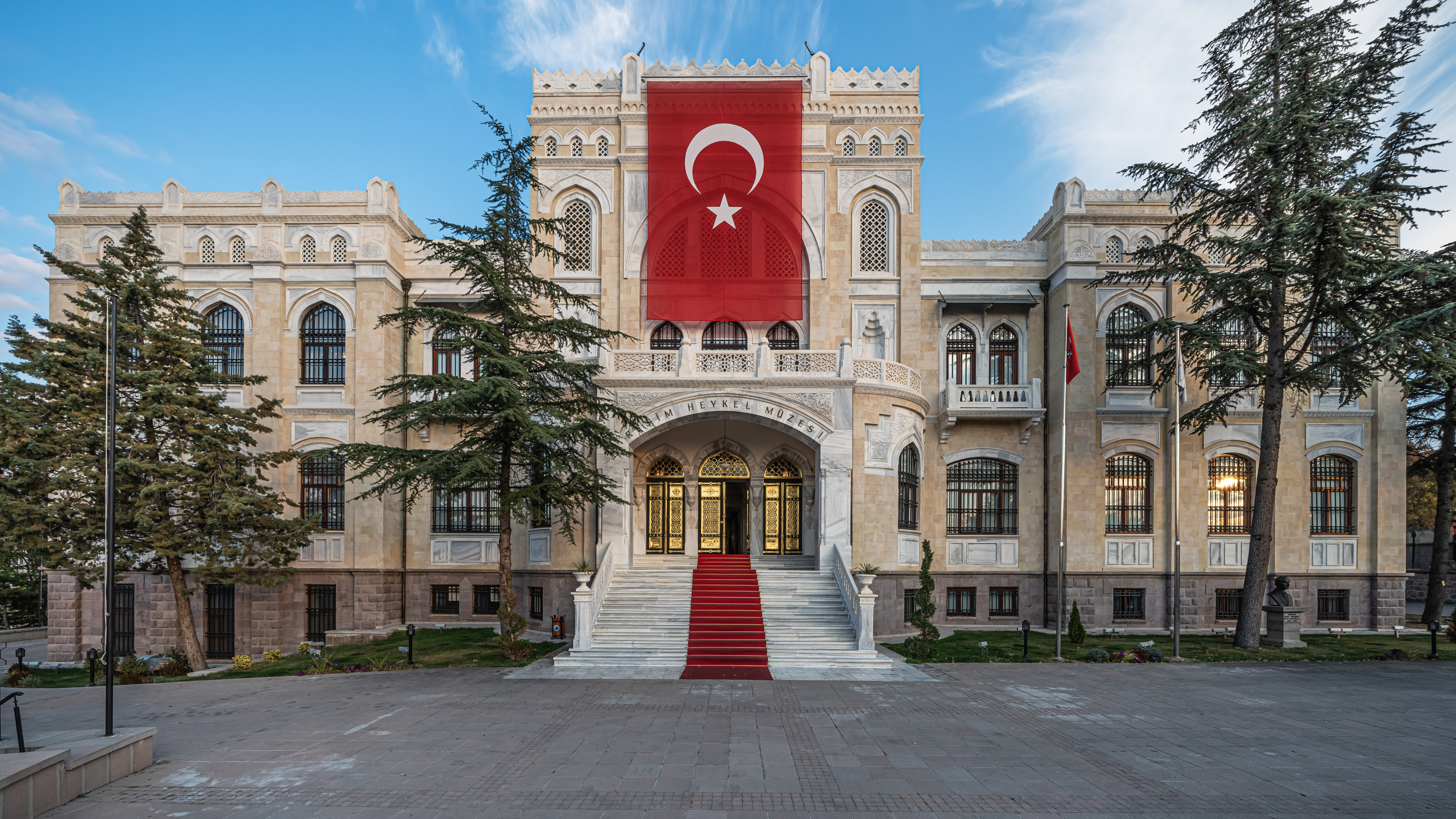
State Art and Sculpture Museum, opened in 1930

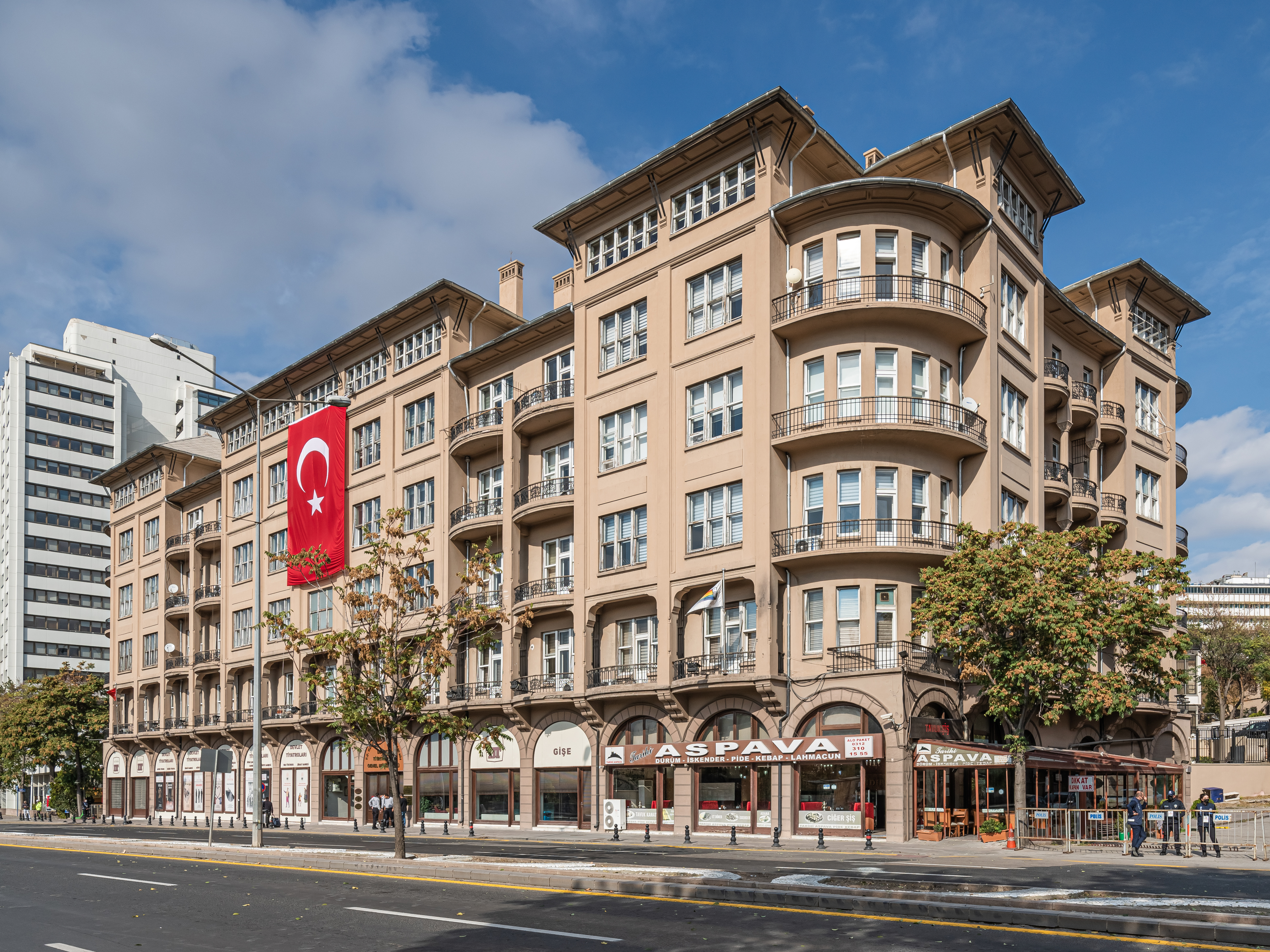
Second Evkaf Apartment in Altındağ

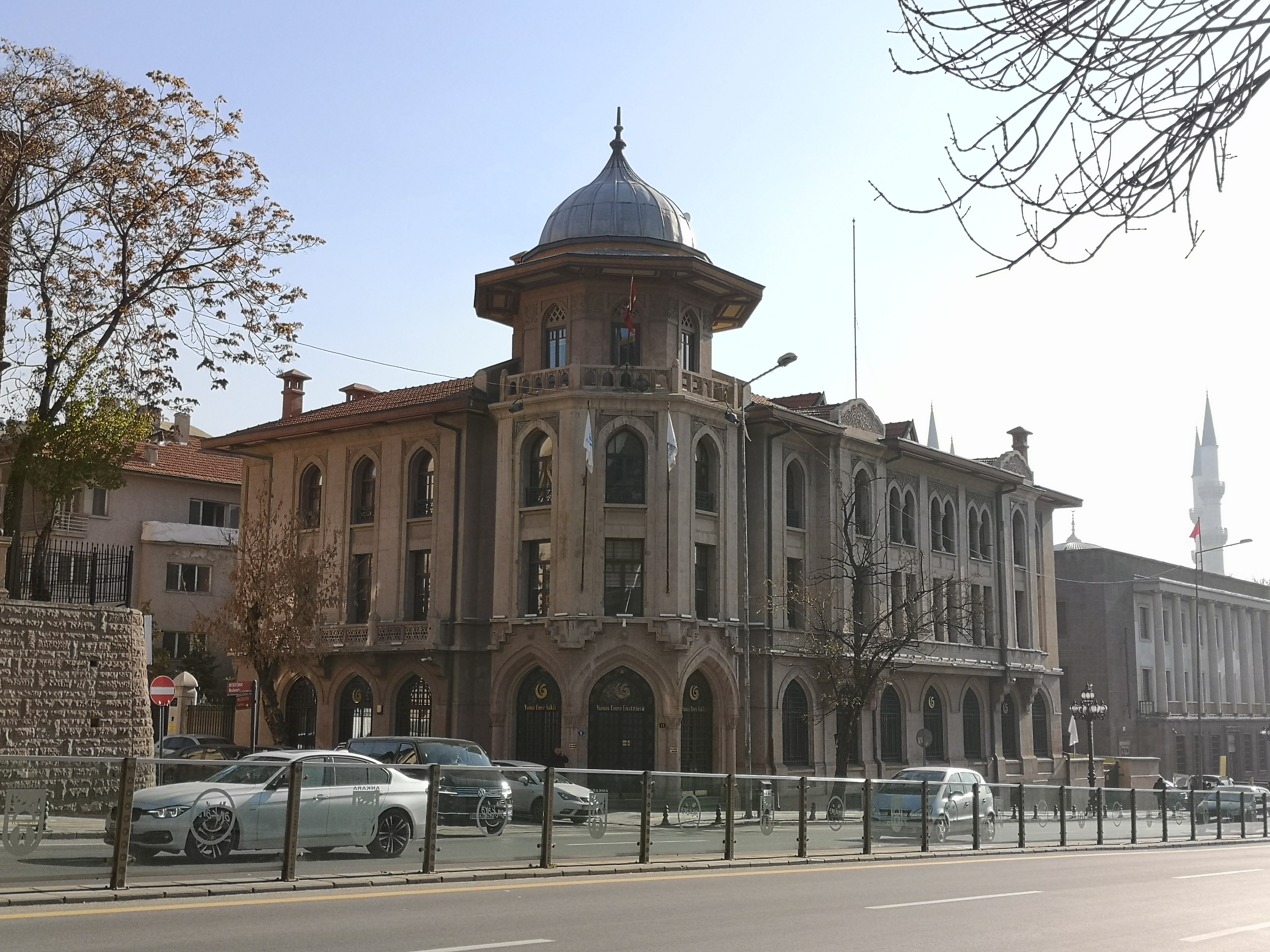
Yunus Emre Institute

Mustafa Kemal Atatürk, in seeking to revise a number of aspects of Turkish culture, used what he saw as the ancient heritage and village life of the country, forcing the removal of perceived Arabic and Persian cultural influences. Metropolitan Museum of Art summarized this period as "While there was a general agreement on the rejection of the last flowering of Ottoman art, no single, all-encompassing style emerged to replace it. The early years of the Republic saw the rise of dozens of new schools of art and the energetic organization of many young artists."

The State Art and Sculpture Museum was dedicated to fine arts and mainly sculpture. It was designed in 1927 by architect Arif Hikmet Koyunoğlu and built between 1927 and 1930 as the Türkocağı Building, upon the direction of Mustafa Kemal Atatürk. It is located close to the Ethnography Museum and houses a rich collection of Turkish art from the late 19th century to the present day. There are also galleries for guest exhibitions.

Fine art drive

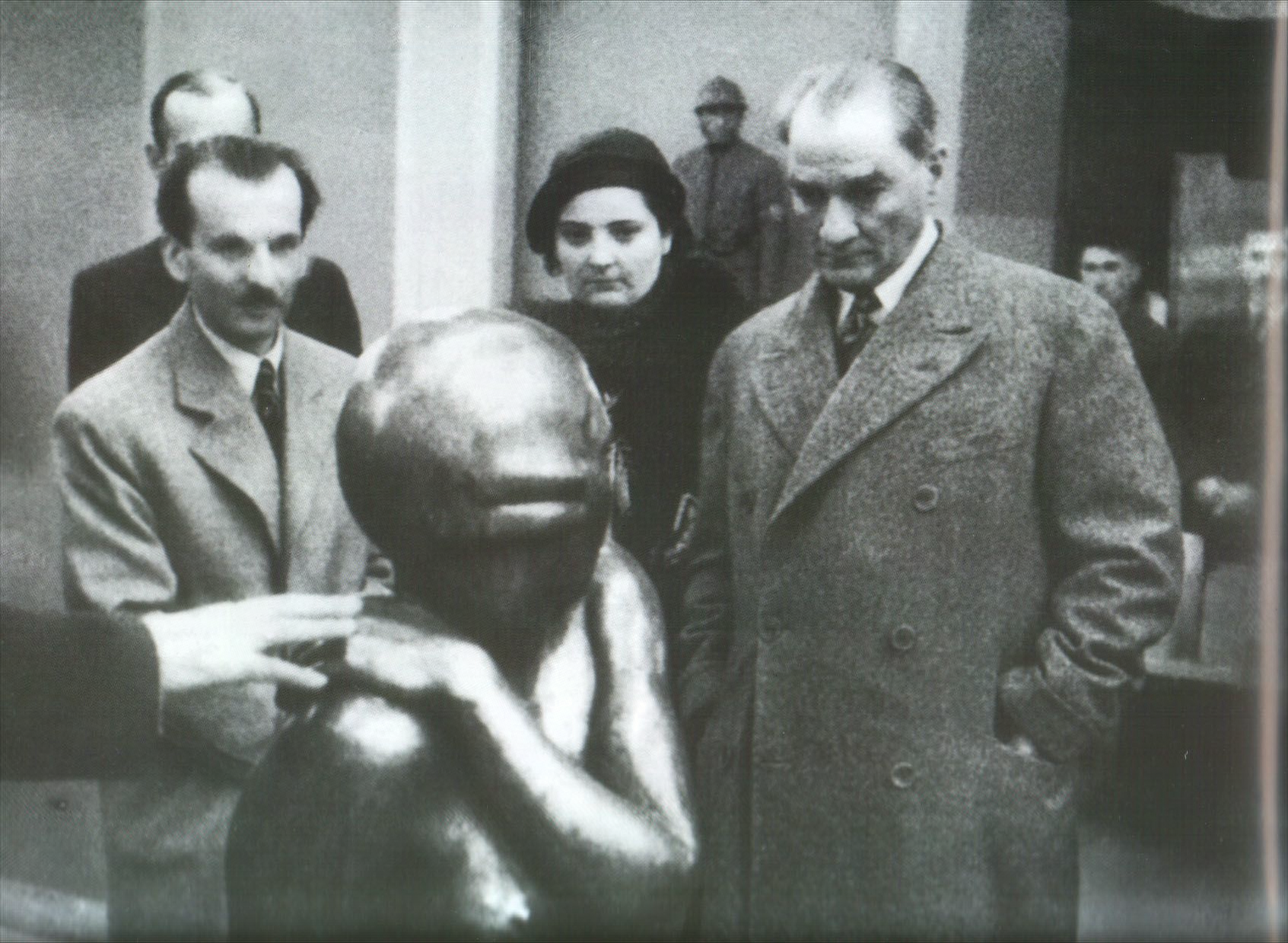
Opening of the State Art and Sculpture Museum in 1927

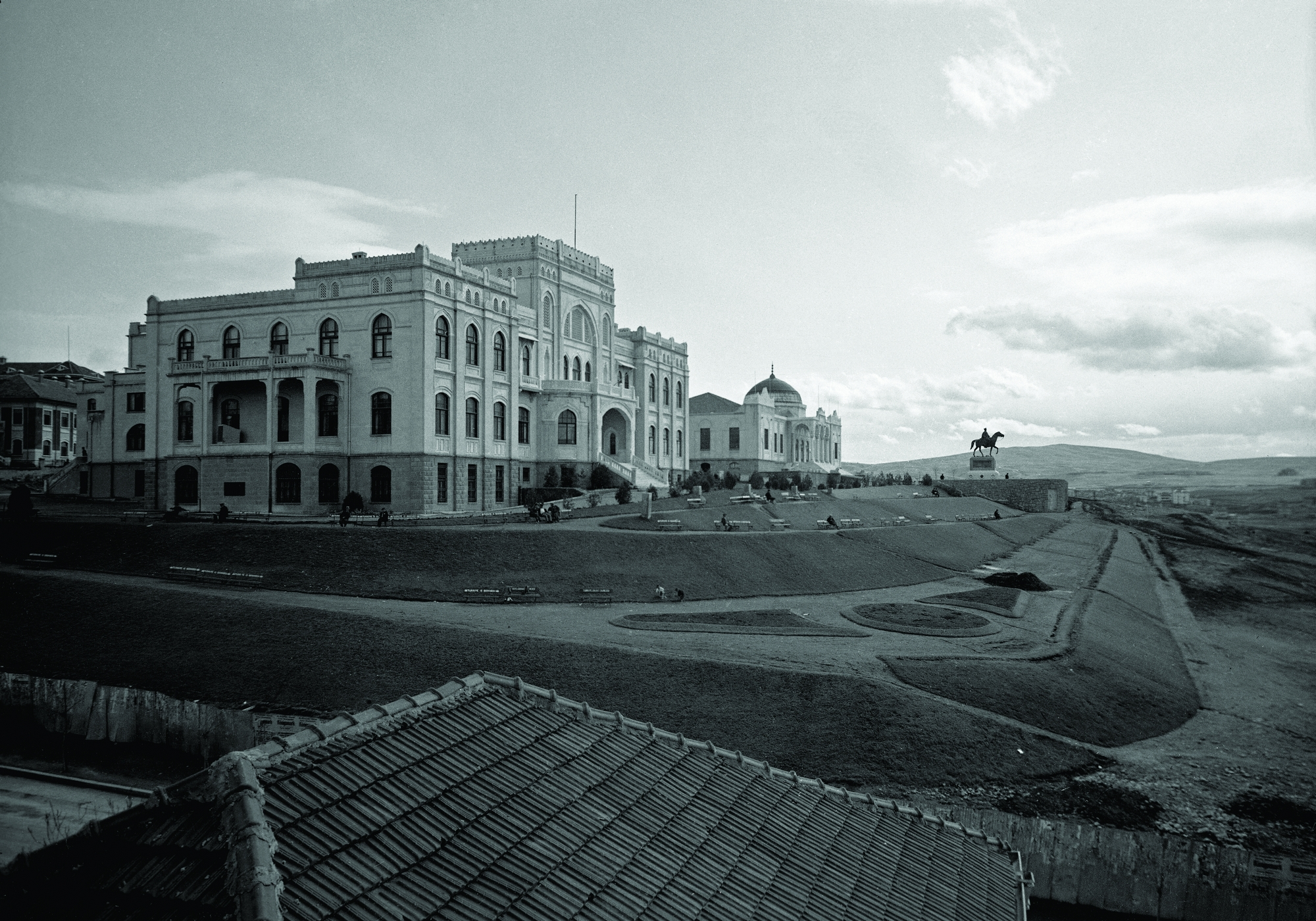
The Ethnography Museum in the 1930s

== Legal reforms ==
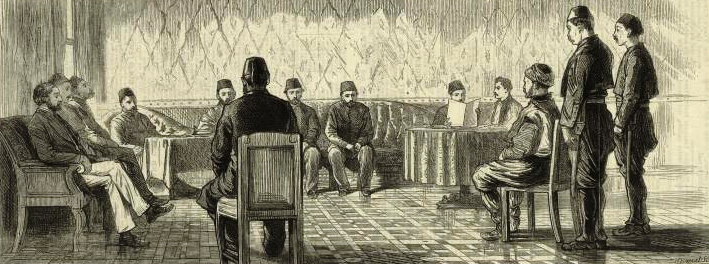
An Ottoman trial in 1877

The Ottoman Empire was a religious empire in which each religious community enjoyed a large degree of autonomy with the Millet structure. Each millet had an internal system of governance based upon its religious law, such as Sharia, Catholic Canon law, or Jewish Halakha. The Ottoman Empire tried to modernize the code with the reforms of 1839 Gülhane Hatt-i Sharif which tried to end confusion in the judicial sphere by extending the legal equality to all citizens.

The leading legal reforms instituted included a secular constitution (laïcité) with the complete separation of government and religious affairs, the replacement of Islamic courts and Islamic canon law with a secular civil code based on the Swiss Civil Code, and a penal code based on that of Italy (1924–37).

=== Legal system ===
On 8 April 1924, sharia courts were abolished with the law Mehakim-i Şer'iyenin İlgasına ve Mehakim Teşkilatına Ait Ahkamı Muaddil Kanun.

=== Codification ===
The codification of Ottoman law had begun long before the Republic. The Mecelle and the 1917 Ottoman Family Law Decree were earlier attempts to place parts of civil and family law into written legal codes. The latter introduced changes concerning marriage and divorce, although it was repealed in 1919.

Ruth A. Miller disputes the view that the Civil Code of 1926 was simply a translation of the Swiss model. In her comparison of its provisions on persons, marriage and divorce, she found that at least 35 per cent had been changed, omitted or supplemented, and that some of these changes retained elements of Ottoman and Islamic legal practice. The non-Muslim millets affected by the Age of Enlightenment in Europe modernized Christian law. In the Ottoman Empire, Islamic law and Christian law became drastically different. In 1920, and today, many forms of Islamic law do not contain provisions regulating the sundry relationships of "political institutions" and "commercial transactions". The rules relating to "criminal cases", shaped under Sharia were too limited in serving their purpose adequately. Beginning with the 19th century, the Ottoman Islamic codes and legal provisions were generally impracticable in dealing with the wider concept of social systems. In 1841, a new criminal code was drawn up in the Ottoman Empire. However, when the Empire dissolved, there was still no legislation with regard to family and marital relationships. Polygamy was also banned, and was not to be practiced by law-abiding citizens of Turkey after Atatürk's reforms, in contrast to the former rules of the Mecelle. There were thousands of other articles in the Mecelle which were not used due to their perceived inapplicability.

The adaptation of laws relating to family and marital relationships is an important step attributed to Mustafa Kemal. The reforms also instituted legal equality and full political rights for both sexes in 1934, well before several other European nations. A penal code based on that of Italy was passed between 1924 and 1937.

== Educational reforms ==
The creation of a centralized state school system also predated the Republic. Under Abdul Hamid II, the Ottoman government expanded state schooling and introduced new curricula and forms of discipline. Benjamin C. Fortna has examined these changes as part of the late Ottoman state's attempt to strengthen its relationship with its subjects through education.

Major achievements in educational reforms

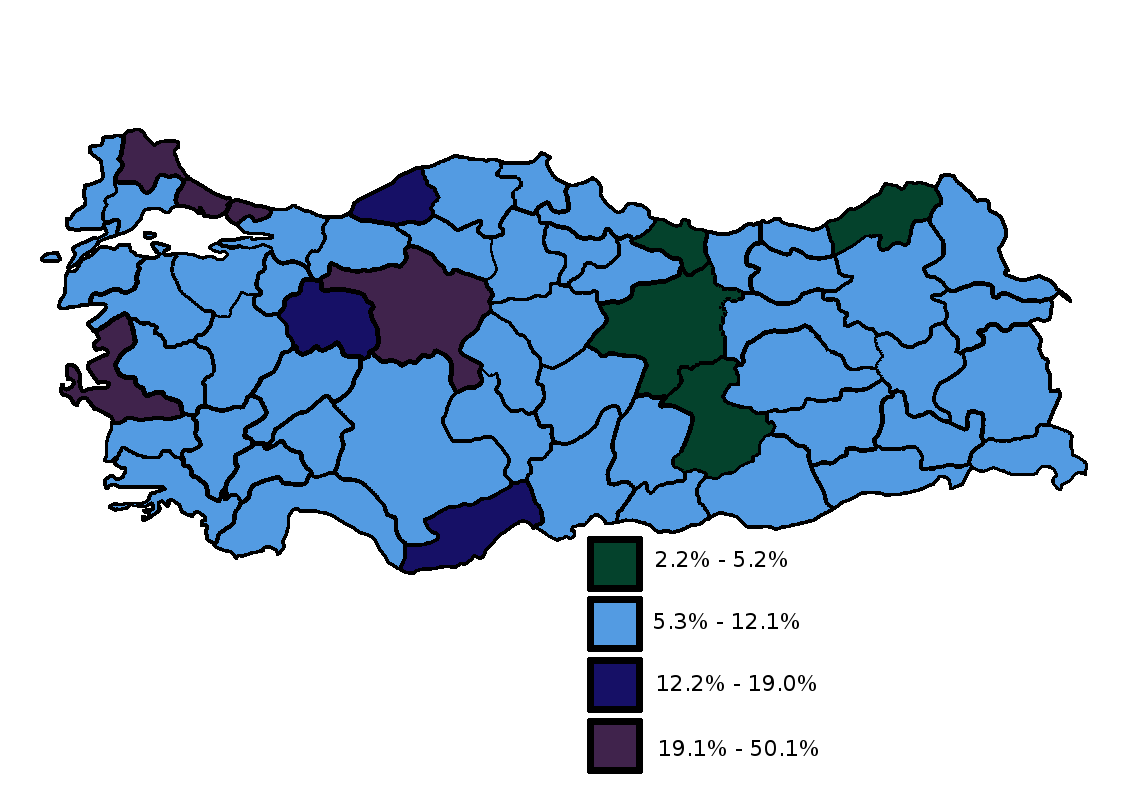
Literacy in Turkey, 1924

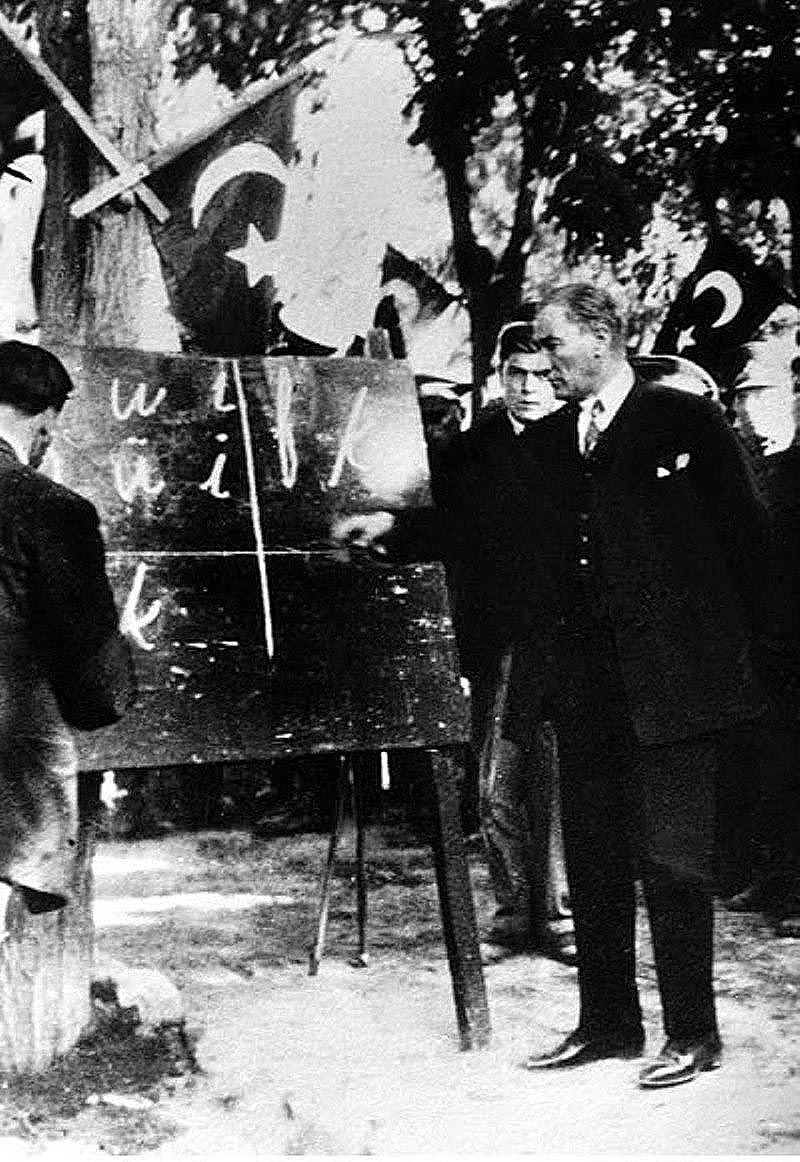
Introduction of the new Turkish alphabet in Kayseri, on 20 September 1928

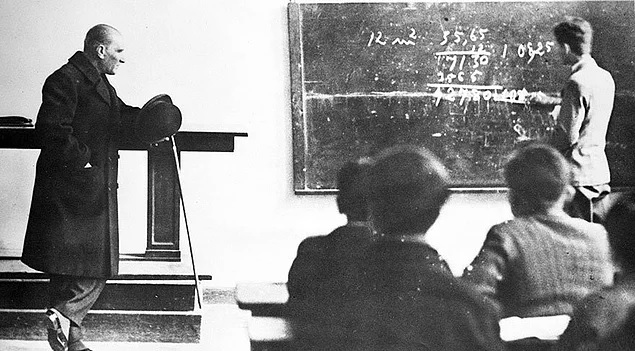
Atatürk visiting a math class at İzmir High School for Boys, 1 February 1931

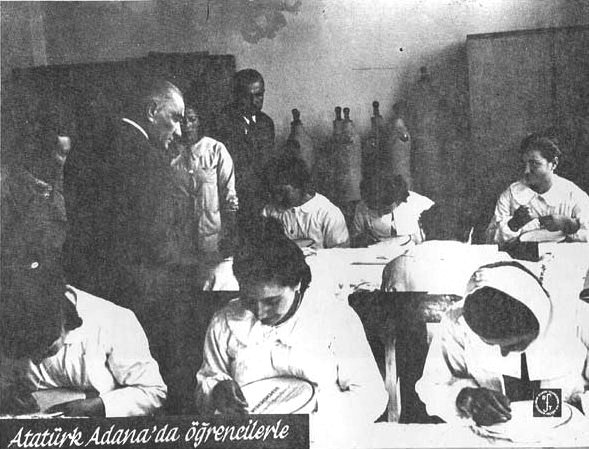
Atatürk visiting a women's skills program in Adana

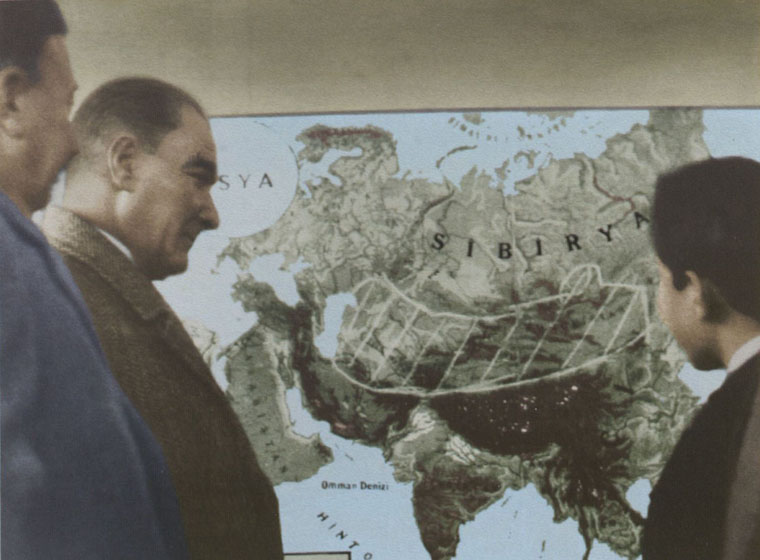
Atatürk in geography class in a school in Samsun

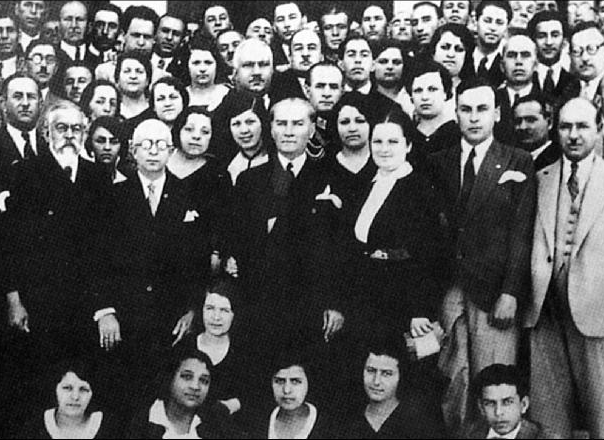
Establishment ceremony of the Turkish History Institution in 1931

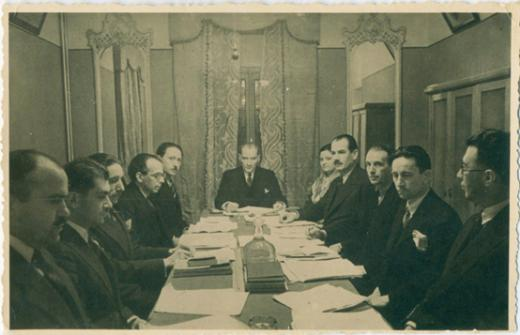
Meeting of the Turkish Language Association, 1933

Educational systems (schooling) involve institutionalized teaching and learning in relation to a curriculum, which was established according to a predetermined purpose of education. Ottoman schools were a complex educational system differentiated mainly by curricula. The Ottoman educational system had three main educational groups of institutions. The most common institutions were medreses based on learning Arabic, teaching the Quran using the method of memorization. The second type of institution were the idadî and sultanî, which were the reformist schools of the Tanzimat era. The last group included colleges and minority schools in foreign languages that often used more recent teaching models in educating their pupils.

The unification of education, along with the closure of the old-style universities, and a large-scale program of science transfer from Europe; education became an integrative system, aimed to alleviate poverty and used female education to establish gender equality. Turkish education became a state-supervised system, which was designed to create a skill base for the social and economic progress of the country. Unification came with the Law on Unification of National Education, which introduced three regulations. They placed the religious schools owned by private foundations under the scope of the Ministry of Education. By the same regulations, the Ministry of Education was ordered to open a religious faculty at the Darülfünun (later to become the Istanbul University) and schools to educate imams.

Atatürk's reforms on education made education much more accessible: between 1923 and 1938, the number of students attending primary schools increased by 224% from 342,000 to 765,000, the number of students attending middle schools increased by 12.5 times, from around 6,000 to 74,000 and the number of students attending high schools increased by almost 17 times, from 1,200 to 21,000.

The increase in enrollment did not, however, mean that the reforms reached the whole population. Mustafa Tuna, comparing village life in Turkey and Soviet Central Asia, argues that the Kemalist reforms failed to reach rural Turkey, where more than 80% of the population lived. According to Tuna, the Kemalist leadership preserved existing village authority structures and lacked the resources needed to bring about the intended cultural changes.

=== Militarization of education ===
Military training was added to the curriculum of secondary education with the support of Mustafa Kemal who stated "just as the army is a school, so is the school an army". He was also in favor of deploying army sergeants as teachers.

=== Coeducation and the education of girls ===
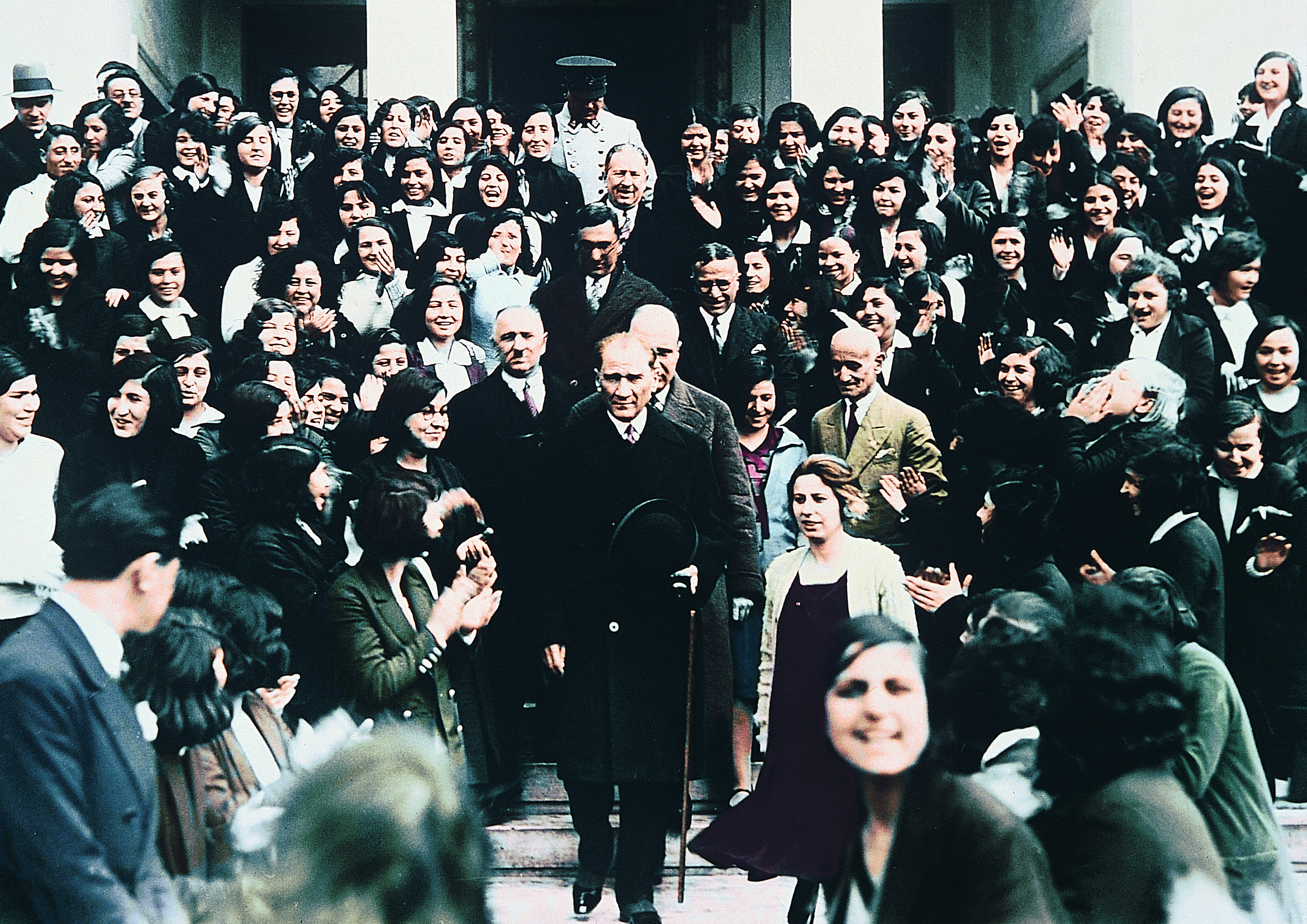
Atatürk visits İzmir High School for Girls on 1 February 1931. After the reorganization of Istanbul University by the University Law of 31 May 1933, the Turkish government introduced coeducational education in academies, colleges and universities in Turkey.

In 1915, during the Ottoman period, a separate section for girl students named the İnas Darülfünunu was opened as a branch of the İstanbul Darülfünunu, the predecessor of the modern Istanbul University.

Atatürk was a strong supporter of coeducation and the education of girls. Coeducation was established as the norm throughout the educational system by 1927. Centuries of sex segregation under Ottoman rule had denied girls equal education, Atatürk thus opposed segregated education as a matter of principle. The matter of coeducation was first raised as a result of a controversy in Tekirdağ in 1924, where, due to the lack of a high school for girls, girls requested enrollment in the high school for boys. Upon this, works on coeducation began and the Minister of Education declared that both sexes would follow the same curriculum. In August 1924, it was decided that coeducation would be introduced to primary education, giving boys the right to enroll in girls' high schools and vice versa. Atatürk declared in his Kastamonu speech in 1925 that coeducation should be the norm. Whilst the educational committee had agreed in 1926 to abolish single-sex education in middle schools that were not boarding schools, segregation persisted in middle and high schools, and statistics in the 1927–28 educational year revealed that only 29% of those enrolled in primary schools were girls. This figure was 18.9% for middle schools and 28% for high schools. Acting on these figures, 70 single-sex middle schools were converted to coeducational schools in 1927–28 and new coeducational middle schools were established. This was despite the opposition of Köprülüzade Fuat Bey, the Undersecretary for Education. Whilst the policy was transition to coeducational high schools based on the success in middle schools from 1928 to 1929 onwards, this policy could only be implemented effectively from 1934 to 1935 onwards.

=== Higher education ===
One of the cornerstone of educational institutions, the University of Istanbul, accepted German and Austrian scientists whom the National Socialist regime in Germany had considered 'racially' or politically undesirable. This political decision (accepting German and Austrian scientists) established the nucleus of science and modern [higher education] institutions in Turkey. The reform aimed to break away the dependency on the transfer of science and technology by foreign experts.

Name	Founded	Description
Ankara School of Judicial Law	5 November 1925	Founded to overwrite the obsolete Ottoman Law with a novel, secular legal framework.
Gazi Institute of Education	1 March 1927	School of educational sciences to cultivate teachers for elementary, middle, high, technical schools, and the village institutes. It later evolved into establishing the Gazi University.
Istanbul University	1 August 1933	The already existing Darülfünun, founded in 1453, was a school of natural sciences with a religious madrasah. A decree by the Turkish Parliament transformed the school into a general university.
Higher Agricultural Institute	30 October 1933	Originally founded in 1930 as the Higher School of Agriculture, it offered degrees in agriculture, veterinary medicine, and forestry. The institute was later incorporated into the Ankara University.
School of Political Sciences	10 June 1935	The original Mülkiye was established in Constantinople, 1859 to raise the Ottoman bureaucracy. In 1935, the Turkish government moved the school to Ankara under a new identity.
Faculty of Language and History – Geography	22 June 1935	Founded by Mustafa Kemal Atatürk as an independent humanities school to promote the Turkish History Thesis, languages, and archeology. Restructured under the Ankara University in 1946.
Ankara Faculty of Medicine	23 June 1937	It was established in 1937 as an alternative to the Istanbul Faculty of Medicine. However, the school could not begin education until 1946 as the efforts were hindered by World War II.

=== Religious education ===
First, all medreses and schools administered by private foundations or the Diyanet were connected to the Ministry of National Education. Second, the money allocated to schools and medreses from the budget of the Diyanet was transferred to the education budget. Third, the Ministry of Education had to open a religious faculty for training higher religious experts within the system of higher education, and separate schools for training imams and hatips.

=== Improving literacy ===
The literacy movement aimed adult education for the goal of forming a skill base in the country. Turkish women were taught not only child care, dress-making and household management, but also skills needed to join the economy outside the home.

==== New alphabet ====
The adoption of the Latin script and the purging of foreign loan words was part of Atatürk's program of modernization. The two important ends were sought, which were the democratization of writing and language, and the 'secularization' of the Turkish language.

Turkish had been written using a Turkish form of the Perso-Arabic script for a thousand years. It was well suited to write the Ottoman Turkish vocabulary that incorporated a great deal of Arabic and Persian vocabulary and even grammar. However, it was poorly suited for older, Turkic grammar and vocabulary, which was rich in vowels and poorly represented by the Arabic script, an abjad which by definition only transcribed consonants. It was thus inadequate at representing Turkish phonemes. Some could be expressed using four different Arabic signs; others could not be expressed at all. The introduction of the telegraph and printing press in the 19th century exposed further weaknesses in the Arabic script.

Use of the Latin script had been proposed before. In 1862, during Tanzimat, the statesman Münif Pasha advocated a reform of the alphabet. At the start of the 20th century, similar proposals were made by several writers associated with the Young Turks movement, including Hüseyin Cahit, Abdullah Cevdet, and Celâl Nuri. The issue was raised again in 1923 during the first Economic Congress of the newly founded Turkish Republic, sparking a public debate that was to continue for several years. Some suggested that a better alternative might be to modify the Arabic script to introduce extra characters to better represent Turkish vowels.

A language commission responsible for adapting the Latin script to meet the phonetic requirements of the Turkish language was established. The resulting Latin script was designed to reflect the actual sounds of spoken Turkish, rather than simply transcribing the old Ottoman script into a new form. The current 29-letter Turkish alphabet was established. It was a key step in the cultural part of Atatürk's Reforms. The Language Commission (Dil Encümeni) consisting of the following members:

The Language Commission
Linguists	Ragıp Hulûsi Özdem	Ahmet Cevat Emre	İbrahim Grandi Grantay
Educators	Mehmet Emin Erişirgil	İhsan Sungu	Fazıl Ahmet Aykaç
Writers	Falih Rıfkı Atay	Ruşen Eşref Ünaydın	Yakup Kadri Karaosmanoğlu

Atatürk himself was personally involved with the commission and proclaimed an "alphabet mobilisation" to publicise the changes. In 1926 the Turkic republics of the Soviet Union adopted the Latin script, giving a major boost to reformers in Turkey. On 1 November 1928, the new Turkish alphabet was introduced by the Language Commission at the initiative of Atatürk, replacing the previously used Perso-Arabic script. The Language Commission proposed a five-year transition period; Atatürk saw this as far too long and reduced it to three months. The change was formalized by the Turkish Republic's law number 1353, the Law on the Adoption and Implementation of the Turkish Alphabet, passed on 1 November 1928. The law went into effect from 1 January 1929, making the use of the new alphabet compulsory in all public communications.

==== Literacy drive (Millet Mektepleri) ====
Before the adoption of the new alphabet a pilot program had been established with 3304 class units around Turkey, awarding a total of 64,302 certificates. This program was declared to be unsuccessful and a new organization was proposed which would be used in the drive to introduce the new alphabet. The name of the new organization which would be used in the literacy drive was "Millet mektepleri".

National Education Minister Mustafa Necati Bey passed the "National Schools Directive" (Directive) 7284 dated 11 November 1928, which stated that every Turkish citizen between the ages of 16–30 (only primary education had been made mandatory at the time) had to join the Millet Mektepleri and this was mandatory. It was also noted that it would be in two stages. Atatürk became the General Chairman of the initial (group I) schools and became the "principal tutor" of 52 schools (teacher training schools) around the country, teaching, course requirements, the money for the provision of classrooms, the use of the media for propaganda purposes, the documents of those schools were successfully established. The active encouragement of people by Atatürk himself, with many trips to the countryside teaching the new alphabet, was successful, which lead to the second stage.

In the first year of the second stage (1928), 20,487 classrooms were opened; 1,075,500 people attended these schools, but only 597,010 received the final certificate. Due to the global economic crisis (Great Depression) there was insufficient funding and the drive lasted only three years and 1 ½ million certificates were presented. The total population of Turkey in this period was less than 10 million, which included the mandatory primary education age pupils who were not covered by this certificate. Eventually, the education revolution was successful, as the literacy rate rose from 9% to 33% in just 10 years.

The literacy reform was supported by strengthening the private publishing sector with a new Law on Copyrights and congresses for discussing the issues of copyright, public education and scientific publishing.

=== Curriculum secularization and nationalization ===
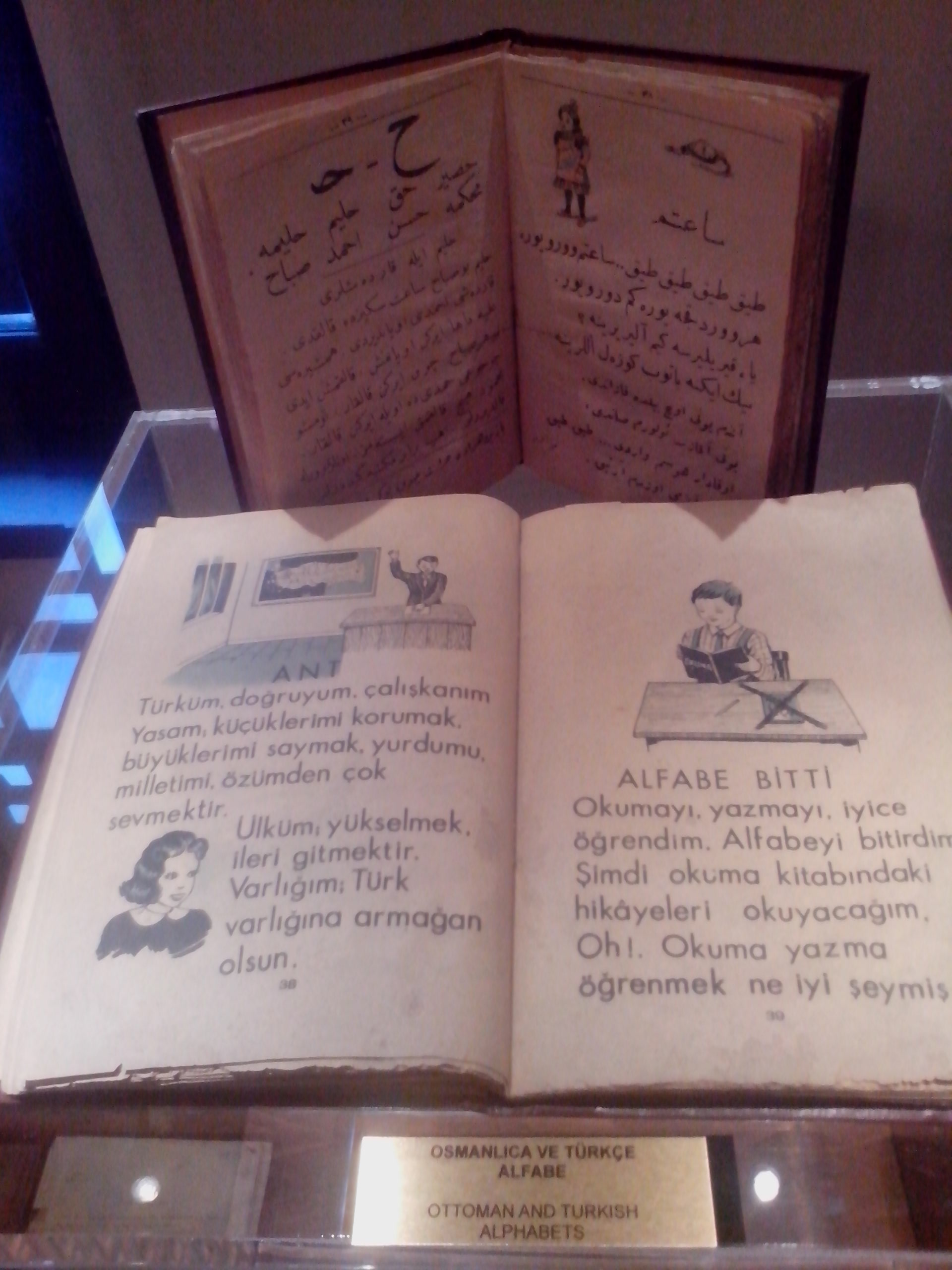
Ottoman Turkish alphabet and 1930s modern Turkish alphabet guide, from the Republic Museum, Ankara

Another important part of Atatürk's reforms encompassed his emphasis on the Turkish language and history, leading to the establishment of the prescriptivist linguistic institution, the Turkish Language Association and Turkish Historical Society for research on Turkish language and history, during the years 1931–2. Adaptation of technical vocabulary was another step of modernization, which was tried thoroughly. Non-technical Turkish was vernacularized and simplified on the ground that the language of Turkish people should be comprehensible by the people. A good example is the Turkish word "Bilgisayar" (bilgi = "information", sayar = "counter"), which was adapted for the word "Computer".

The second president of Turkey, İsmet İnönü explained the reason behind adopting a Latin script: "The alphabet reform cannot be attributed to ease of reading and writing. That was the motive of Enver Pasha. For us, the big impact and the benefit of alphabet reform was that it eased the way to cultural reform. We inevitably lost our connection with Arabic culture."

The alphabet's introduction has been described by the historian Bernard Lewis as "not so much practical as pedagogical, as social and cultural – and Mustafa Kemal, in forcing his people to accept it, was slamming a door on the past as well as opening a door to the future." It was accompanied by a systematic effort to rid the Turkish language of Arabic and Persian loanwords, often replacing them with words from Western languages, especially French. Atatürk told his friend Falih Rıfkı Atay, who was on the government's Language Commission, that by carrying out the reform "we were going to cleanse the Turkish mind from its Arabic roots."

Yaşar Nabi, a leading pro-Kemalist journalist, argued in the 1960s that the alphabet reform had been vital in creating a new Western-oriented identity for Turkey. He noted that younger Turks, who had only been taught the Latin script, were at ease in understanding Western culture but were quite unable to engage with Middle Eastern culture. The new script was adopted very rapidly and soon gained widespread acceptance. Even so, the Turkish Arabic script nonetheless continued to be used by older people in private correspondence, notes and diaries until well into the 1960s. Perry Anderson argued that the replacement of the script also cut off younger generations from much of the written Ottoman past, leaving an important part of the old literary culture inaccessible without further study.

It was argued by the ruling Kemalist elites who pushed this reform that the abandonment of the Arabic script was not merely a symbolic expression of secularization by breaking the link to Ottoman Islamic texts to which only a minor group of ulema had access; but also Latin script would make reading and writing easier to learn and consequently improve the literacy rate, which succeeded eventually. The change motivated by a specific political goal: to break the link with the Ottoman and Islamic past and to orient the new state of Turkey towards the West and away from the traditional Ottoman lands of the Middle East. He commented on one occasion that the symbolic meaning of the reform was for the Turkish nation to "show with its script and mentality that it is on the side of world civilization."

The idea of absolute monarchy in the textbooks was replaced by the limited ideology known as liberalism. The teachings of Jean-Jacques Rousseau and Montesquieu based republics were added as content.

Şerif Mardin has noted that "Atatürk imposed the mandatory Latin alphabet in order to promote the national awareness of the Turks against a wider Muslim identity. It is also imperative to add that he hoped to relate Turkish nationalism to the modern civilization of Western Europe, which embraced the Latin alphabet."

The new emphasis on Turkish history and language also gave rise to the Turkish History Thesis and the Sun Language Theory. Anderson criticized the historical and linguistic claims promoted by the Kemalist state as nationalist mythology, including the claim that Turkish was the origin of other languages.

Linguist Geoffrey Lewis, in The Turkish Language Reform: A Catastrophic Success, argues that the campaign to remove Arabic and Persian vocabulary led to the creation of artificial words when no Turkish equivalent could be found. He describes the reform as one of the most extensive attempts at linguistic engineering and emphasizes its sometimes unintended results.

The explicitly nationalistic and ideological character of the alphabet reform was illustrated by the booklets issued by the government to teach the population the new script. It included sample phrases aimed at discrediting the Ottoman government and instilling updated "Turkish" values, such as: "Atatürk allied himself with the nation and drove the sultans out of the homeland"; "Taxes are spent for the common properties of the nation. Tax is a debt we need to pay"; "It is the duty of every Turk to defend the homeland against the enemies". The alphabet reform was promoted as redeeming the Turkish people from the neglect of the Ottoman rulers: "Sultans did not think of the public, Ghazi commander [Atatürk] saved the nation from enemies and slavery. And now, he declared a campaign against ignorance. He armed the nation with the new Turkish alphabet."

== Economic reforms ==
Symbols of economic achievements

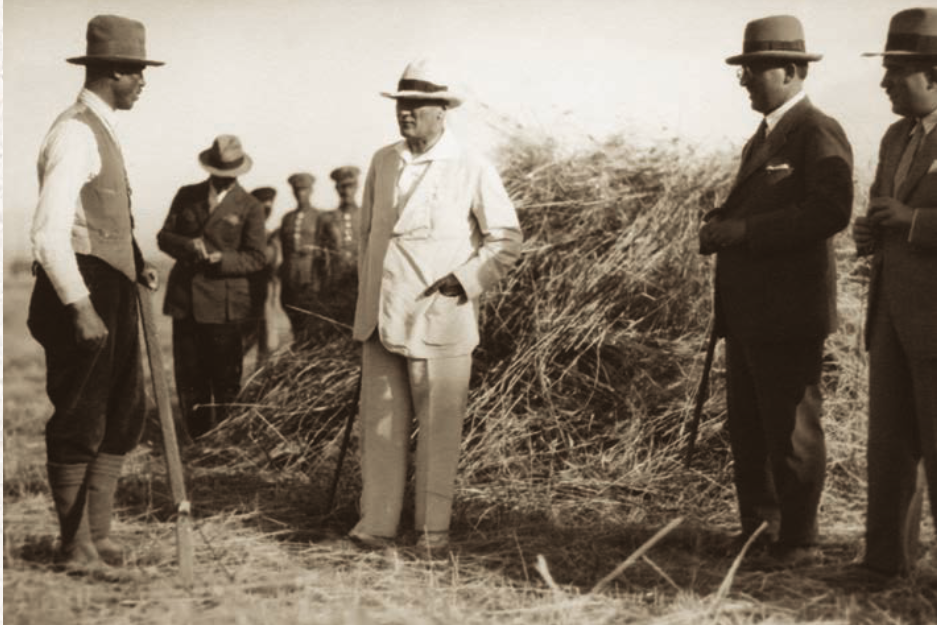
Orman Çiftliği was a model for modern farming methodologies.

Türkiye İş Bankası (1924) was the first Turkish bank established with solely national resources.

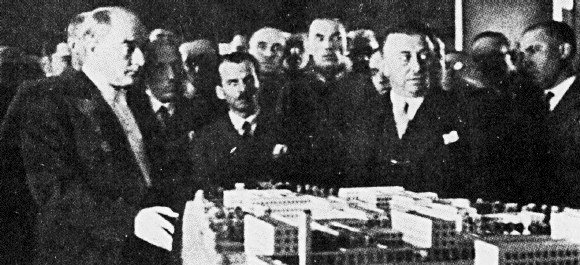
The government-subsidized industrial textile complex of Sümerbank, 1935

The pursuit of state-controlled economic policies by Atatürk and İsmet İnönü was guided by a national vision: they wanted to knit the country together, eliminate foreign control of the economy, and improve communications. Istanbul, a trading port with international foreign enterprises, was abandoned and resources were channeled to other, less-developed cities, in order to establish a more balanced development throughout the country.

=== Agriculture ===
Agha is the title given to tribal chieftains, either supreme chieftains, or to village heads, who were wealthy landlords and owners of major tracts of real estate in the urban centers.

Throughout the mid-1930s through the mid-1940s, attempts were made at land reforms. Atatürk's land reform program redistributed 300,000 hectares to Turkish peasants and opened rural agricultural institutions to educate peasants to become more productive in economic activities. These reforms further culminated in the Reform Law of 1945, 7 years after Atatürk's death. 2.2 million hectares of unused land were confiscated by the government in this reform, along with 3.4 million hectares of government-controlled land, were redistributed to Turkish peasants.

The Ministry of Food, Agriculture and Livestock was established in 1924. The ministry promoted farming through establishing model farms. One of these farms later became a public recreational area to serve the capital, known as the Atatürk Forest Farm.

=== Industry and nationalization ===
The development of industry was promoted by strategies such as import substitution and the founding of state enterprises and state banks. Economic reforms included the establishment of many state-owned factories throughout the country for the agriculture, machine making and textile industries. Many of these grew into successful enterprises and were privatized during the latter part of 20th century.

Turkish tobacco was an important industrial crop, while its cultivation and manufacture were French monopolies under capitulations of the Ottoman Empire. The tobacco and cigarette trade was controlled by two French companies, the Regie Company and Narquileh Tobacco. The Ottoman Empire gave the tobacco monopoly to the Ottoman Bank as a limited company under the Council of the Public Debt. Regie, as part of the Council of the Public Debt, had control over production, storing, and distribution (including export) with an unchallenged price control. Turkish farmers were dependent on Regie for their livelihood. In 1925, this company was taken over by the state and named Tekel.

The development of a national rail network was another important step for industrialization. The State Railways of the Republic of Turkey (Turkish State Railways) was formed on 31 May 1927, and its network was operated by foreign companies. The TCDD later took over the Chemin de Fer d'Anatolie-Baghdad (Anatolian Railway (CFOA)). On 1 June 1927, it had control over the tracks of the former Anatolian Railway (CFOA) and the Transcaucasus Railway line within Turkish borders. This institution developed an extensive railway network in a very short time. In 1927, the road construction goals were incorporated into development plans. The road network consisted of 13,885 km (8,628 mi) of ruined surface roads, 4,450 km (2,770 mi) of stabilized roads, and 94 bridges. In 1935, a new entity was established under the government called "Sose ve Kopruler Reisligi" which would drive development of new roads after World War II. However, in 1937, the 22,000 km (14,000 mi) of roads in Turkey augmented the railways.

=== Establishing the banking system ===
In 1924, the first Turkish bank Türkiye İş Bankası was established. The bank's creation was a response to the growing need for national establishment and the birth of a banking system which was capable of backing up economic activities, managing funds accumulated as a result of policies providing savings incentives and, where necessary, extending resources which could trigger industrial impetus.

In 1931, the Central Bank of the Republic of Turkey was realized. The bank's primary purpose was to have control over the exchange rate, and Ottoman Bank's role during its initial years as a central bank was phased out. Later specialized banks such as the Sümerbank (1932) and the Etibank (1935) were founded.

=== International debt/capitulations ===
The Ottoman Public Debt Administration (OPDA) was a European-controlled organization that was established in 1881 to collect the payments which the Ottoman Empire owed to European companies in the Ottoman public debt. The OPDA became a vast, essentially independent bureaucracy within the Ottoman bureaucracy, run by the creditors. It employed 5,000 officials who collected taxes that were then turned over to the European creditors. Capitulations of the Ottoman Empire (ahdnames) were generally bilateral acts whereby definite arrangements were entered into by each contracting party towards the other, not mere concessions, yet this gradually changed in the 19th century.

Capitulations of the Ottoman Empire were removed by the Treaty of Lausanne (1923), specifically by Article 28. During the Paris Conference of 1925, reformers paid 62% of the Ottoman Empire's pre-1912 debt, and 77% of the Ottoman Empire's post-1912 debt. With the Paris Treaty of 1933, Turkey decreased this amount to its favor and agreed to pay 84.6 million liras out of the remaining total of 161.3 million liras of Ottoman debt. The last payment of the Ottoman debt was made by Turkey on 25 May 1954.

== Social policy reforms and economic progress ==
Atatürk was also credited for his transformational change in Turkish agriculture and ecological development. The Kemalist government planned four million trees, modernized the Turkish agricultural mechanism, implemented flood controls, opened schools in rural areas with rural institutions such as agricultural banks, and implemented land reform that removed heavy taxes on peasants of the Ottoman era. He was described as the "Father of Turkish Agriculture." The Turkish economy developed in an exceptional rate with heavy industrial production increased by 150% and GDP capita rose from US$800 to around 2000 USD by late 1930s, on par with Japan.

Atatürk's regime also passed the 1936 Labor Law, which gave substantial wage increases and improved the working conditions of workers in Turkish enterprises.

== Criticisms ==
Debate over the reforms has focused on their authoritarian methods, their effects on religious and ethnic minorities, and how far they changed society. Historians also disagree on whether they amounted to a social revolution or simply continued earlier Ottoman reforms.

=== Economic policies ===
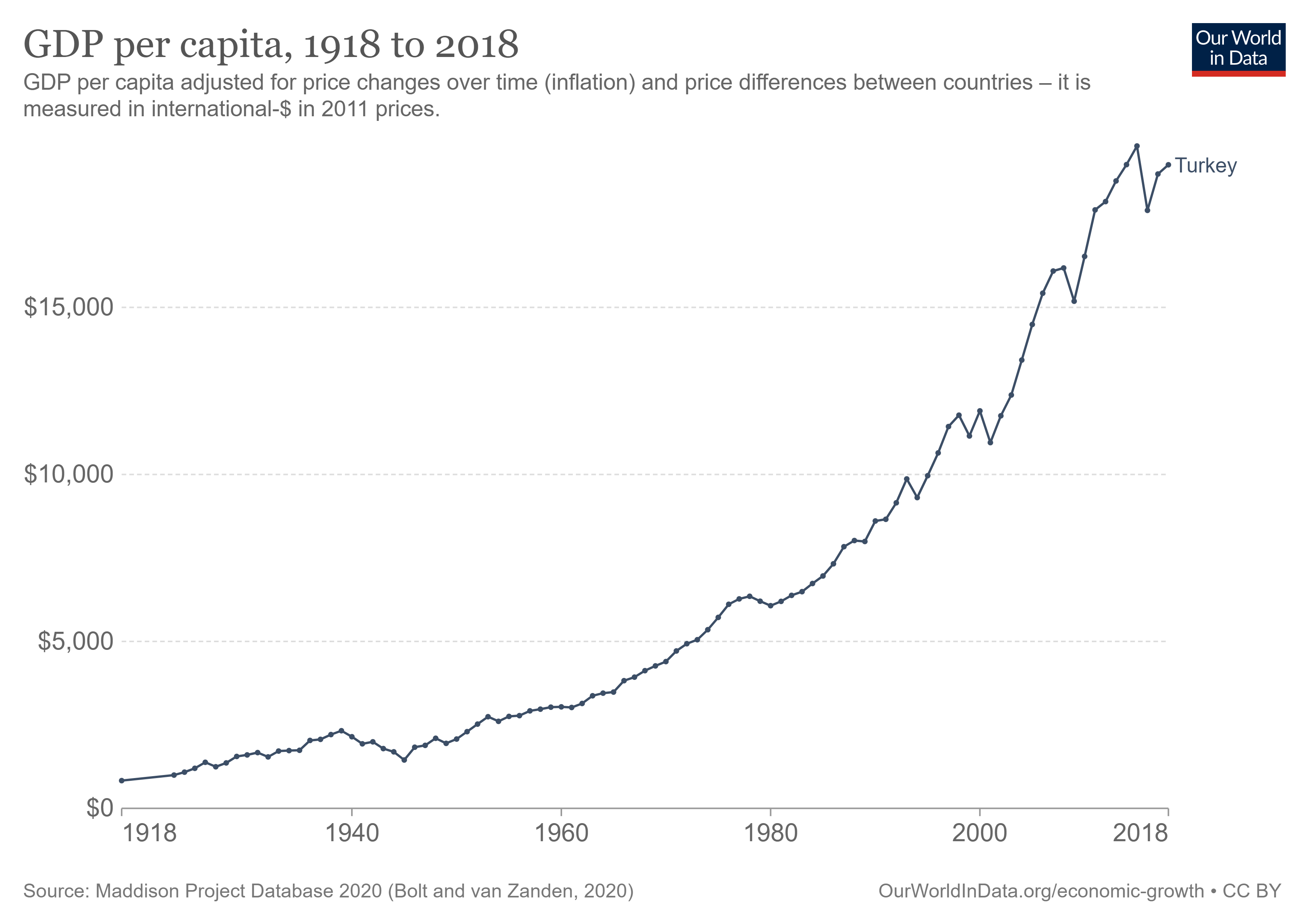
Turkey's GDP per capita, 1918–2018, measured in 2011 international dollars. Some economic historians argue that Atatürk's reforms made almost no contributions to economic growth, with the economy stagnating for decades, even after his death.

Although the government introduced measures to modernize agriculture, it failed to carry out a comprehensive land reform during Atatürk's presidency. According to İbrahim İnci, the Republican governments initially favored large landowners, while the legislation of the 1920s strengthened private property rights and made the redistribution of large estates more difficult. The land distributed to peasants came overwhelmingly from state-owned land, leaving the property of major landowners largely untouched. İnci also found that the state-owned Ziraat Bankası directed much of its lending towards merchants and large landowners, while smaller farmers struggled to obtain credit. Safiye Yelda Kaya similarly argues that the Kemalist government showed little interest in changing landownership relations for more than a decade after the establishment of the Republic, while subsequent proposals for land reform failed to produce comprehensive redistribution.

The government's policy of statism faced limits in industrial production and workers' conditions. Görkem Akgöz argues that despite being presented as symbols of national modernization, state-owned factories suffered from persistent inefficiency and low productivity. The government consequently relied on foreign industrial experts, particularly Germans, to reorganize production and improve factory management. Akgöz also describes the absence of an organized labour movement and the government's attempts to prevent class conflict, including the prohibition of strikes and lockouts under the 1936 Labour Law. Caroline E. Arnold found that workers in state factories resisted low wages and long working hours, forcing the government to provide social services and other benefits to attract and retain industrial labour. She argues that these measures resulted less from a deliberate commitment to workers' welfare than from the practical difficulties of creating and maintaining an industrial workforce.

Turgut Özal believed that the Kemalist etatist principle was one of the culprits for the failure of the Turkish economy.

==== Dispossession of Greeks and Armenians ====
The government's attempt to create a national bourgeoisie involved replacing much of the established Armenian and Greek commercial class, but did little to change the country's economic structure, according to Çağlar Keyder. He writes that the Republic's economic policies largely benefited the emerging Muslim-Turkish commercial bourgeoisie, while the economy remained dependent on foreign capital. He argues that, apart from the replacement of the Greek and Armenian minorities, the country's economy had changed little compared to the pre-1914 period, as foreign firms continued to dominate international trade and foreign-controlled banks retained an important position.

Aytek Soner Alpan also found that the departure of Anatolian Greek merchants following the 1923 population exchange weakened Turkey's commercial connections with foreign markets. The intermediary position previously occupied by Greek merchants was gradually assumed by the newly emerging Turkish commercial bourgeoisie. The formation of the new bourgeoisie was also connected with the confiscation of property belonging to non-Muslim populations. Historian Ümit Kurt argues that the transfer of Armenian, Greek and Assyrian wealth into Muslim-Turkish hands was an important source of capital accumulation for the emerging Republic, while the dispossession of Armenians during the Armenian genocide had already contributed to the rise of a new Muslim middle class under the Committee of Union and Progress. In a study of the long-term economic legacy of the expelled communities, Cemal Eren Arbatlı and Gunes Gokmen found that Armenians and Greeks had contributed significantly to the accumulation of commercial knowledge and occupational skills among Muslims. They also found evidence suggesting that the redistribution of confiscated Armenian property contributed to the concentration of wealth among local Muslim elites.

=== Revolutionary character and Ottoman continuity ===
The Turkish name for Atatürk's reforms is commonly translated as "Atatürk's Revolutions", reflecting the belief that the changes were too profound to be described as mere reforms. Historians disagree over whether they constituted a revolution. The reforms were implemented during the one-party period, largely by the country's ruling political and military elite, rather than through a popular revolutionary movement.

Erik-Jan Zürcher regarded the so-called Kemalist revolution as an extension of the Young Turk movement, whose policies it carried further. He concluded that there had never been a Kemalist revolution, "at least not a social revolution", but an attempt by the ruling military and bureaucratic elite to reshape society from above according to a nineteenth-century concept of modernization. Perry Anderson likewise described Kemalism as a cultural revolution without a social revolution, pointing to the absence of significant changes in property and class relations. In The Young Turk Legacy and Nation Building, Zürcher further emphasized the continuity of personnel, institutions and ideas between the last decades of the Ottoman Empire and the early Republic.

Şerif Mardin maintains that treating Turkish modernization as a process which began with the foundation of the Republic overlooks its connections with the nineteenth-century Tanzimat reforms. Rossella Bottoni also questions the assumed originality of Republican secularism, stressing the secular character of earlier Ottoman reforms affecting dress, schooling and the law. She nevertheless distinguishes the ideology and implementation of Atatürk's laws from those of the Ottoman reformers.

The earlier sultans had introduced reforms in several areas later associated with Atatürk. Under Mahmud II, for example, the state had already regulated the clothing and headgear of officials. İmrag regards the Hat Law as part of this continuing practice of state-directed modernization. Georgeon traces changes in the calendar, working hours and public holidays from 1840 to 1935. In education, Fortna has documented the expansion of state schooling under Abdülhamid II, while Miller finds important elements of the Ottoman legal tradition in the supposedly imported Civil Code of 1926.

Halil Kanadıkırık stresses the continuity of authoritarian modernization from the First Constitutional Era and Abdülhamid II's reign to the early Republic. He argues that changes in the constitutional framework did not necessarily lead to a corresponding change in political culture. Dietrich Jung compares the Republic's centralized political culture with the authoritarian rule of Abdülhamid, arguing that the Kemalist elite used control over national culture as a source of legitimacy.

==== Atatürk's contributions ====
Other scholars have gone even further, suggesting that many of the reforms would have occurred even without Atatürk. In a 2013 interview, historian Ahmet Turan Alkan argued that the reforms would have happened anyway, since nearly all of them, including republicanism and secularism, had been discussed before Atatürk's rise to power, and some had already been partly implemented. He considered that Turkey would have undergone broadly similar changes, although their manner of implementation would have differed. Niyazi Berkes regarded the establishment of a secular Turkish nation-state as the historically inevitable result of the modernization process which had begun during the Ottoman period.

In 1968, journalist İlhan Selçuk argued that Turkey would eventually have established a republic and secularism without Atatürk, although he credited Atatürk with bringing about these changes earlier. Zürcher further argues that the emergence of a Turkish nation-state after the First World War was probably unavoidable, but that the establishment of a republic and the consolidation of authoritarian government were political choices for which alternatives existed.

=== Authoritarianism and totalitarianism ===
The proclamation of a republic and the introduction of popular sovereignty did not put an end to authoritarian government. Opposition parties remained short-lived, while the government used the Law on the Maintenance of Order and the Independence Tribunals against its political opponents. The reforms were therefore implemented at a time when there were few opportunities to oppose the ruling Republican People's Party.

Fikret Adanır rejects the view that the reforms established a one-party regime's authoritarianism as merely a temporary necessity on the road to democracy. He argues that the Republic developed in an authoritarian, potentially totalitarian, direction, and finds significant parallels with the development of European fascism. Adanır describes Atatürk's style of rule as paternalistic, autocratic and elitist, with little room for independent institutions or political opposition.

Taha Parla and Andrew Davison also challenge the idea that Kemalist nationalism represented a straightforward transition to liberal democracy. In their study of Atatürk's speeches and the documents of the Republican People's Party, they identify authoritarian corporatism and an emphasis on state authority in the regime's understanding of political life. Vahram Ter-Matevosyan, Dietrich Jung and Wolfgango Piccoli emphasize continuities in authoritarian and totalitarian ideas between the Young Turks and Kemalism.

=== Nationalism, Turkification and minority populations ===
According to Uğur Ümit Üngör, the policies of the Republican government in eastern Anatolia involved the forced assimilation of Kurds, demographic engineering and the use of education to promote Turkish national identity. The Citizen, speak Turkish! campaigns also placed pressure on speakers of other languages. Senem Aslan argues that the campaigns were supported by nationalist organizations and individuals as well as by the state.

The government's understanding of nationality was not always civic. Nazan Maksudyan has shown how racial theories were promoted in anthropological publications during the early Republican period, contributing to the idea that Turks constituted a distinct and dominant race. The Settlement Law of 1934 also provided for the relocation of populations deemed insufficiently Turkish. Pınar Dinç connects the policy of national integration in Dersim with forced assimilation and the military operations and mass killings of 1937–1938.

=== Religious and cultural reforms ===
Probably the most controversial area of reform was that of religion. The policy of state secularism met with opposition at the time and continued to generate social and political tension. According to Gavin D. Brockett, opposition to the reforms cannot be explained simply as religious "reaction", a term which, in his view, has misrepresented the relationship between religion and the new Republic. Umut Azak notes that Kemalist secularism did not mean the disappearance of religion from public authority, since the state sought to supervise religious life and establish its own conception of Turkish Islam.

Some people thought that the pace of change under Atatürk was too rapid as, in his quest to modernize Turkey, he effectively abolished centuries-old traditions. The Hat Revolution was enforced through state regulation and the criminal prosecution of protesters. According to Adanır, approximately 50 people were sentenced to death in connection with protests against the compulsory adoption of Western-style hats in 1925–1926. İmrag also finds that the introduction of hats imposed an economic burden on ordinary citizens, even though the cost of imports later diminished as domestic production increased.

Geoffrey Lewis argues that the attempt to remove Arabic and Persian vocabulary produced artificial new words and unintended changes to Turkish usage. He described the policy as a "catastrophic success". Anderson argued that the replacement of the Ottoman script also prevented later generations from reading much of the literature of the Ottoman past without additional training, while he regarded some historical and linguistic theories promoted by the regime as nationalist mythology.

=== Effectiveness and social change ===
Patrick Kinross held that the bulk of the population willingly accepted the reforms, although they were often more closely associated with the urban elites than with the inhabitants of the rural countryside. Other historians see a more limited transformation. Mustafa Tuna, using first-hand accounts and statistical data, concluded that the reforms failed to reach rural Turkey, where more than 80% of the population lived. He argued that the Kemalist government preserved the existing structures of authority in the countryside and tried to change culture without having the resources to do so. Perry Anderson maintained that the government carried out a far-reaching cultural transformation but left the structure of society, property relations and class relations largely unchanged.

=== Women's rights and state feminism ===
==== Political objectives ====
Bruna Ferreira and Vinícius Santiago argue that the reforms were intended to serve the construction of the modern Turkish state, rather than fundamentally transform the unequal relations between men and women. According to Şirin Tekeli, the granting of political rights to women also served to demonstrate the modern and democratic character of the Turkish Republic and distinguish the Kemalist government from the contemporary fascist regimes of Germany and Italy. Esra Ercan Bilgiç writes that the image of the emancipated Turkish woman was used to promote the Kemalist government's official ideology and construct a new national identity in opposition to the Ottoman past.

==== Extent of women's emancipation ====
Deniz Kandiyoti questions whether the legal emancipation of women led to their liberation in everyday social and political life, despite the significance of their new legal rights.

Zehra F. Arat finds that the Kemalist government's policies were limited in their intentions, and that the reforms sought to improve women's position without fundamentally challenging the patriarchal structure of society. In her view, the government aimed to educate women and improve their skills so that they could better perform their duties as wives and mothers within what she describes as a "Republican patriarchy".

Jenny B. White finds that the reforms were imposed from above and primarily reflected the interests and values of an urban, Westernized elite. In White's account, the ideal Republican woman was educated, professionally active and publicly visible, but was also expected to remain dutiful within the family. The reforms did little to address women's position within the household, including domestic violence and other forms of patriarchal control. She also argues that the model of the Republican woman excluded much of the country's rural and religious female population.

Despite the adoption of the Civil Code of 1926, several legal inequalities remained. Article 152 designated the husband as the head of the family, while Article 159 required married women to obtain their husbands' permission to work. The latter provision remained in force until its annulment by the Constitutional Court in 1990, which became effective in 1992.

==== Turkish Women's Union ====
In 1923, Nezihe Muhiddin attempted to establish the Women's People's Party, but the proposed party was rejected. She subsequently founded the Turkish Women's Union, although she was later removed from its leadership and marginalized politically. Barbara Dell'Abate Çelebi interprets Muhiddin's exclusion as a defeat of independent feminism with lasting consequences. Kathryn Libal has also examined the dissolution of the Turkish Women's Union in 1935, shortly after it hosted an international women's congress in Istanbul, arguing that the organization was forced to disband.

=== Military and the republic ===
Not only were all the social institutions of Turkish society reorganized, but the social and political values of the state were replaced as well. This new, "secular" state ideology was to become known as Kemalism, and it remained central to the political system of the Turkish Republic. Since the establishment of the republic the Turkish military has perceived itself as the guardian of Kemalism, and it has intervened in Turkish politics to that end on several occasions, including the overthrow of civilian governments by coup d'état. Military leaders and secularists justified some of these interventions as necessary to protect Kemalism and the "secular" state, although military coups interrupted civilian government and democratic politics.

== Milestones ==
=== 1920s ===
- Political: 1 November 1922: Abolition of the office of the Ottoman Sultanate
- Political: 29 October 1923: Proclamation of the Republic – Republic of Turkey
- Political: 3 March 1924: Abolition of the office of Caliphate held by the Ottoman Caliphate
- Economic: 24 July 1923: Abolition of the capitulations with the Treaty of Lausanne
- Educational: 3 March 1924: The centralization of education
- Legal: 8 April 1924: Abolition of sharia courts
- Economic: 1924: The Weekend Act (Workweek)
- Economic: 17 February 1925: Abolition of ashar
- Social: 25 November 1925: Change of headgear for men
- Social: 30 November 1925: Closure of religious convents and sectarian lodges
- Economic: 1925: Establishment of model farms (e.g.: Orman Çiftliği, present-day Atatürk Orman Çiftliği)
- Social: 1925: The international time and calendar system (Gregorian calendar, time zone)
- Legal: 1 March 1926: Introduction of the new penal law modeled after the Italian penal code.
- Legal: 4 October 1926: Introduction of the new civil code modeled after the Swiss civil code
- Legal: 1926: The Obligation Law
- Legal: 1926: The Commercial Law
- Economic: 31 May 1927: Establishment of the Turkish State Railways
- Educational 1 January 1928: Establishment of the Turkish Education Association
- Educational: 1 November 1928: Adoption of the new Turkish alphabet

=== 1930s ===
- Educational: 1931: Establishment of the Turkish Historical Society for research on history
- Educational: 12 July 1932: Establishment of the Turkish Language Association for regulating the Turkish language
- Economic: 1933: The System of Measures (International System of Units)
- Economic: 1 December 1933: First Five Year Development Plan (planned economy)
- Educational: 31 May 1933: Regulation of the university education
- Social: 21 June 1934: Surname Law
- Social: 26 November 1934: Abolition of titles and by-names
- Political: 5 December 1934: Full political rights for women to vote and be elected.
- Social: 14 October 1935: Closure of the Masonic lodges
- Political: 5 February 1937: The inclusion of the principle of laiklik (secularism) in the constitution.
- Economic: 1937: Second Five Year Development Plan (planned economy)
