= İsmail Fenni Ertuğrul =

Turkish writer and thinker (1855–1946)

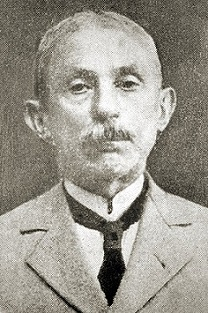

Personal details
- Born: 1855 Veliko Tarnovo, Ottoman Empire (now in Bulgaria)
- Died: 1946 (aged 90–91)

İsmail Fenni Ertuğrul (1855–1946) was an Ottoman Empire and later Turkish writer and thinker.
