= Nazan Maksudyan =

Historian and academic (born 1977)

Nazan Maksudyan (born 1977) is a historian and academic.

== Works ==
- Maksudyan, Nazan (2014). Orphans and Destitute Children in the Late Ottoman Empire. Syracuse University Press. ISBN 978-0-8156-5297-7.
- Maksudyan, Nazan, ed. (2014). Women and the City, Women in the City: A Gendered Perspective on Ottoman Urban History. Berghahn Books. ISBN 978-1-78238-412-0.
- Maksudyan, Nazan (2019). Ottoman Children and Youth during World War I. Syracuse University Press. ISBN 978-0-8156-5473-5.
