= Hasan Eren =

Turkish linguist and academic (1919 - 2007)

- Born: 15 March 1919; Vidin, Kingdom of Bulgaria
- Died: 26 May 2007 (aged 88); Ankara, Turkey
- Citizenship: Turkish citizenship
- Education: Eötvös Loránd University
- Known for: Turkish and Hungarian language studies
- Scientific career
- Fields: Turkish language, Turkic languages, Hungarian language
- Workplaces: Ankara University; Turkish Language Association

Hasan Eren (15 March 1919, Vidin, Kingdom of Bulgaria – 26 May 2007, Ankara, Turkey) was a Turkish academic etymologist, linguist, Turkologist, and Hungarologist specializing in Turkish language, other Turkic languages, and Hungarian language who served as head of the Turkish Language Association from 1983 to 1993. He was a member of the Hungarian Academy of Sciences in 1988. Eren was working on etymology of Turkish for decades. He also wrote the Dictionary of Turkish Etymology. Viktor Orbán awarded Hasan Eren by a medal (Order of Merit of the Republic of Hungary) for his contributions to the Hungarian language on 24 June 2000.
