= Ragıp Hulûsi Özdem =

Turkish politician

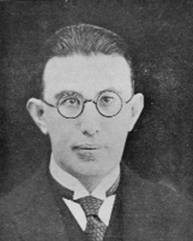
- 1920s

Personal details
- Born: 1893 Salonica, Ottoman Empire
- Died: 1943 (aged 49–50)
- Occupation: Linguist, politician

Ragıp Hulûsi Özdem (1893–1943) was a Turkish linguist and politician, who played an early role in the Kemalist modernization movement. He was a member of the commission responsible for introducing the modern Turkish alphabet.
