= Turkish Language Association =

Official regulatory body of the Turkish language

- Türk Dil Kurumu
- Logo of the Turkish Language Association
- Abbreviation: TDK
- Formation: July 12, 1932; 94 years ago
- Purpose: Regulatory body of the Turkish language
- Headquarters: Atatürk Boulevard No.: 217, Çankaya, 0668 Ankara, Turkey
- Official language: Turkish
- President: Osman Mert
- Key people: Mustafa Kemal Atatürk; Sâmih Rif'at (Yalnızgil); Ruşen Eşref Ünaydın; Celâl Sahir Erozan; Yakup Kadri Karaosmanoğlu
- Website: www.tdk.gov.tr

The Turkish Language Association (Turkish: Türk Dil Kurumu, TDK) is the regulatory body for the Turkish language, founded on 12 July 1932 by the initiative of Mustafa Kemal Atatürk and headquartered in Ankara, Turkey. The Institution acts as the official authority on the language, contributes to linguistic research on Turkish and other Turkic languages, and is charged with publishing the official dictionary of the language, Güncel Türkçe Sözlük.

== Origins ==
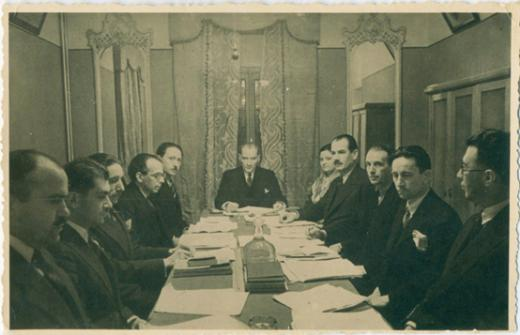
1933 meeting of the Association

A Language Council (Turkish: Dil Heyeti) which was established in March 1926 following approval of a draft bill presented by Education Minister Mustafa Necati in the Turkish parliament. In 1928 it was tasked with the latinization of the Turkish alphabet. The Language Council would be put under the supervision of a Central Bureau, in which also Ahmet Cevat Emre, later the head of the Grammar and Syntax commission of the TDK, would take a seat in. Upon request of Prime Minister İsmet Paşa (İnönü) the Language Council attempted to translate the French dictionary Petit Larousse into Turkish. The council then assigned certain words from the new Turkish dictionary to popular Turkish authors and professors of the Istanbul University, the only Turkish university at that time. The professors refused the use of the proposed neologisms which caused some protest by the Language Council to İsmet Paşa. The language council was dissolved in July 1931, after the Turkish parliament canceled their funds over the lack of results. Also years after having been tasked to translate the French Larousse, there was no Turkish translation of it.

== History ==
=== Foundation ===
The TDK was established on 12 July 1932, initially under the name Society for Research on the Turkish Language (Türk Dili Tetkik Cemiyeti) by the initiative of Mustafa Kemal Atatürk, president of the Republic of Turkey, Samih Rıfat, Ruşen Eşref Ünaydın, Celâl Sahir Erozan and Yakup Kadri Karaosmanoğlu, all prominent names in the literature of the period and members of the Grand National Assembly of Turkey. Following the establishment of the TDK, Atatürk called for the purification of the Turkish language, in order to remove the "yoke of the foreign tongues".

The first president of the association was Samih Rıfat, the first secretary general was Ruşen Eşref Ünaydın, the head specialist was Abdülkadir İnan and the head Western languages specialist was Agop Dilaçar.

The institution's name was changed to Turkish Language Research Institute in 1934, and it became the Turkish Language Institution in 1936.

=== Functions ===
The institution heads academic linguistic research in Turkey into the Turkish language and its sister Turkic languages of Central Asia. In the 1930s the Hittite and Sumerian languages were also included in the group of Turkish languages, while the origin of Indo-European and Semitic language was disputed.

At the same time, the Association led campaigns to replace the Arabic and Persian loanwords in the Turkish language. During the 3rd Congress the Sun Language Theory was presented according to which the Ural-Altaic, Indo-European and Semitic languages had their source in the Turkish language. And since Turkish was the source of all languages, loanwords could further on persist and French loanwords were adopted more frequently.

Recently however, the attention of the institution has been turned towards the persistent infiltration of Turkish, like many other languages, with English words, as a result of the globalization process. Since the 1980s, TDK campaigns for the use of Turkish equivalents of these new English loanwords. It also has the task of coining such words from existing Turkish roots if no such equivalents exist, and actively promoting the adoption of these new coinages instead of their English equivalents in the daily lives of the Turkish population. TDK claims it does not coin Turkish equivalent words for foreign words which are already rooted deep down in the language such as "kalem (pencil, pen [from Arabic]), kitap (book [from Arabic]), radyo (radio [from French]), televizyon (television [from French])" but recently borrowed words such as "computer (bilgisayar [lit. information counter]), icetea (buzlu çay [lit. tea with ice]), flash memory (taşınabilir bellek [lit. portable memory])".

Turkey currently does not have a legal framework to enforce by law the recommendations of TDK in public life (contrary to Académie française in France, for example). In 2020, the TDK presented a report to the High Advisory Board which recommended the submission of a draft bill to the Grand National Assembly of Turkey to limit the use of foreign words in news media, advertising, and commercial communications. As of 2026, no further updates on this proposed bill have been made public.

Several members of the TDK support the implementation of a pure Turkish for daily use.

== Publications ==
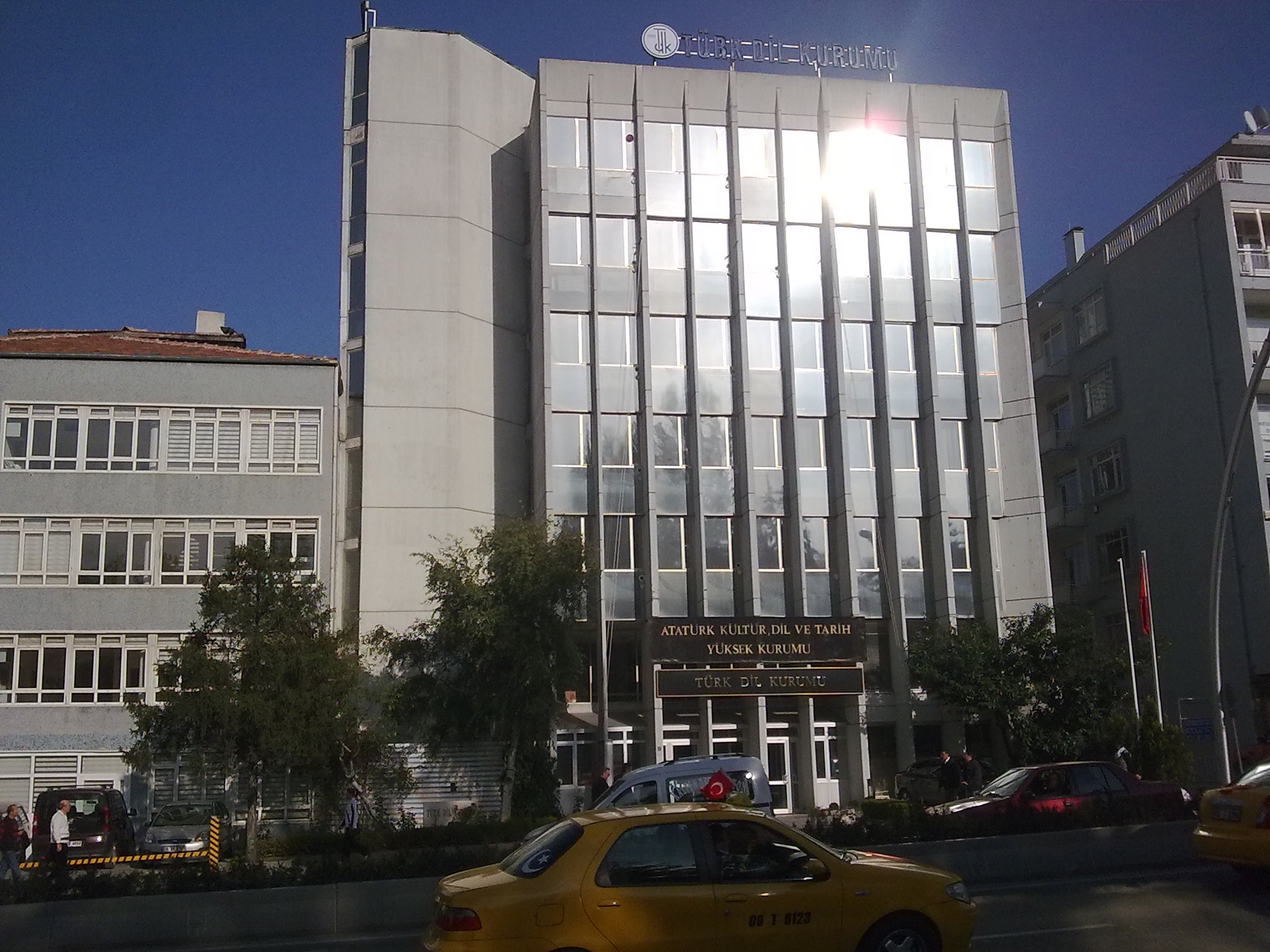
Turkish Language Association building, Ankara

In 1935 it published an Ottoman Turkish/Pure Turkish dictionary to show the improvements of the language reform. It publishes Türkçe Sözlük, the official Turkish dictionary, and Yazım Kılavuzu, the Turkish writing guide, in addition to many other specialized dictionaries, linguistics books and several periodicals.

The institution, in addition to maintaining Güncel Türkçe Sözlük has published more than 850 linguistics related books, mainly consisting of studies on Turkic languages, specialized dictionaries, philological books, and works of literature.

TDK also publishes Türk Dili, a journal on Turkish literature, since 1951, Belleten, the annual journal on Turkic languages, since 1953, and Türk Dünyası, another periodical published twice a year on Turkish language and literature since 1996.

== Controversies ==
The TDK allegedly changed the definition of the word "çapulcu" (plunderer) to "the one who acts deviant against the order, the one who ruins the order", after Recep Tayyip Erdoğan used the word against demonstrators in the Gezi Park protests, this has caused controversy. The change has been criticized stating that the TDK was unsuccessful in finding the relationship between the word and its root "çapul" (plunder) along with other synonyms such as "plaçkacı" and "yağmacı", both meaning "looter". TDK rejected the claims that the word had been changed.

== See also ==
- Hasan Eren, head of the TLA from 1983 to 1993
- Turkish Historical Society
