= Abdulkadir Inan =

Turkish historian (1889–1976)

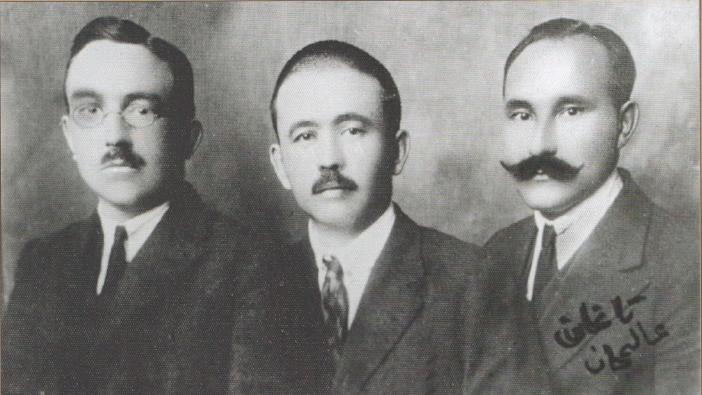
Abdulkadir Inan (centre) with Zeki Velidi Togan (left) and Galimyan Tagan (right)

Abdülkadir İnan (Russian: Абдулкадир Инан; Bashkir: Әбделҡадир Инан, romanized: Äbdelqadir İnan; 26 September 1889 – 1 October 1976, Istanbul) was a Turkish historian and folklorist of Bashkir background. He was the author of over 350 scientific articles.

== Early life and education ==
He was born into the Qazböri family of the Ulu Qatay tribe in the village Çigay, close to Jekaterinburg He received his primary education in Çigay and in 1905 he entered vocational school in Troick from which he graduated in 1914. Following he was a teacher for secondary education in the Russian Empire, and served in the army of the Russian Empire during World War I. From 1908 onwards he wrote articles for the Vakit in Orenburg. Initially focusing on education, he soon expanded into ethnography and folkloric heritage of the Bashkirs.After the end of WWI he stayed in Moscow and St. Petersburg until 1919, where he worked in libraries. In 1919, he founded a Society for the Research of the Bashqiri heritage and folklore in Ufa. He was involved in the early Soviet government of the Bashkir areas. Due to difficulties with the local Government he left for Tachkent, where he wrote for the newspaper Ackoy. In 1923 left the Soviet Union over Ashgabat, Iran, Afghanistan and India to Europe where he worked in libraries in Paris and Berlin.

== In Turkey ==
He finally settled in Turkey in 1925 where he became an assistant to Mehmed Fuad Köprülü and was involved in the development of the Sun Language Theory. Between 1928 and 1932 he was a member of the Scientific Commission in the Turkish Folkloric Association. In 1933, he was appointed as the head specialist of the Turkish Language Association and in 1935 he assumed as a Professor in Turkology at the University of Ankara.
