= Ruşen Eşref Ünaydın =

Turkish politician and diplomat

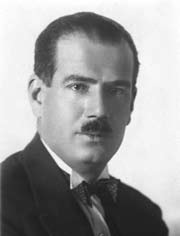

Personal details
- Born: 18 March 1892 Istanbul, Ottoman Empire
- Died: 21 September 1959 (aged 67) Istanbul, Turkey
- Party: Republican People's Party (CHP)
- Education: Galatasaray High School
- Alma mater: Istanbul University, Faculty of Literature
- Occupation: Politician, diplomat and journalist

Ruşen Eşref Ünaydın (1892–1959) was a Turkish linguist, politician, journalist, diplomat, author, and scholar of writer. He contributed to Süs, a women's magazine, between 1923 and 1924. Ünaydın was a member of the commission that introduced the modern Turkish alphabet. He was also one of the founders and the first secretary general (1933) of the Turkish Language Association. He was appointed as the ambassador to Albania (1934), Hungary (1939–1943), Italy (1943–1944), the United Kingdom (1944–1945), and Greece (1945–1952).

Ünaydın was a pioneer in Turkish literature and journalism due to the interviews he published in 1917 and 1918. Considered the first modern features in Turkish newspapers, they were later published as a book entitled "Diyorlar Ki" (Thus They Said).
