= Prohibition of letters Q, W and X in Turkey =

Turkish law from 1928 to 2013

The state of Turkey placed an official prohibition on the use of the letters Q, W, and X from 1928 to 2013. The policy was a consequence of the country's 1928 alphabet reform, which replaced the Ottoman Arabic script with a modified Latin alphabet consisting of 29 letters. Because these three letters were excluded from the official Turkish alphabet, their use in official documents, personal names, and public communications was restricted for decades. While the policy was presented as a linguistic standardization measure, it became closely associated with the suppression of Kurdish linguistic and cultural expression because the Kurdish Latin alphabet uses all three letters extensively. The restrictions remained in force until reforms introduced in 2013 legalized their use, although the letters were not incorporated into the official Turkish alphabet.

== Background ==
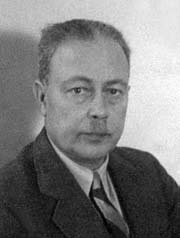
Falih Rıfkı Atay was among the key contributors to Turkish alphabet in the 20th century.

In 1928, the Republic of Turkey, under the leadership of Mustafa Kemal Ataturk, adopted a new Latin-based alphabet as part of a broader modernization program. The new Turkish alphabet contained 29 letters and deliberately removed Q, W, and X because these characters were considered unnecessary for representing sounds in the Turkish language. The reform sought to simplify literacy and establish a standardized national language. The reason for removing these letters were not simply linguistic and the state wanted to remove non-Turkish words (especially Arabic ones) and make the pronunciation of Turkish words easier for Europeans. The letter Q and its associated phoneme /q/ exist in Azerbaijani language and many Turkish dialects across Turkey, however the council led by Falih Rıfkı Atay and others decided to remove this letter as well. The introduction of the new alphabet lead to marginalization and prosecution of Kurds and Arabs in modern Turkey given that these letters were present in their alphabet especially in Kurdish Latin alphabet.

== Controversy and human rights violations ==
There has been many cases of prosecution of people, especially Kurdish people, who violated this prohibition that was known as the alphabet law. Some of these case became controversial especially after 2000s when Turkey intended to join the European Union. In 2006 a Kurdish mayor named Osman Baydemir who spelled the word Newroz with W was sentenced to jail, however the charges were dropped following the public pressure. In another controversial case a journalist was exonerated of the same charge in 2009. However, there have been many other cases in which people faced jail or fines for using letters Q, W and X including 20 individuals who faced charges in 2004.

== Removal of the ban ==
The ban was in place until 2013. In that year, Turkey's High Court of Appeal approved the verdict of a local court to remove the overall ban and decriminalize the public display of these letters. It was believed that this move was a part of the introduced democracy package and a part of Turkey's aspiration to join the European Union. Turkey had been criticized for suppressing the linguistic rights of minorities before this, and this prohibition was an example of these linguistic discriminations. Following the removal of the ban, the Organization of Turkic States adopted the letters, however, the official alphabet of Turkey remained unchanged.

== Current situation ==
While the overall ban is currently removed, using these letters in Kurdish names is not allowed yet. There has been many post 2013 reports of Kurdish individuals who wanted to give their children names that included Q, W and X (or other letters of the Kurdish alphabet) but faced legal challenges in Turkey.
