= Samih Yalnızgil =

Turkish linguist and politician

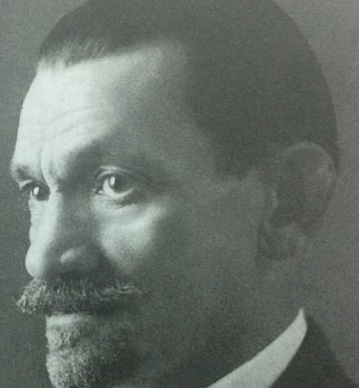

Personal details
- Born: 1875 Constantinople, Ottoman Empire
- Died: 1932 (aged 56–57)

Samih Yalnızgil, also known as Samih Rıfat (1875 – 1932) was a Turkish linguist and politician, who was one of the founders of the Turkish Language Association, which he also served as its president. He was the father of renowned poet Oktay Rifat.
