= Turkish Braille =

Braille alphabet of the Turkish language

- Script type: alphabet
- Print basis: Turkish alphabet
- Languages: Turkish

Related scripts
- Parent systems: Braille: English Braille; Turkish Braille

Turkish Braille (kabartma yazı) is the braille alphabet of the Turkish language.

== Alphabet ==
Turkish Braille follows international usage. The vowels with diacritics, ö and ü, have their French/German forms, whereas the consonants with diacritics, ç, ğ, and ş, have the forms of the nearest English approximations, ch, gh, and sh. Dotless i is derived by shifting down.

a	b	c	ç	d	e	f	g	ğ	h
ı	i	j	k	l	m	n	o	ö	p
r	s	ş	t	u	ü	v	y	z	⠀ (braille pattern blank)

The accent point, ⠈, is used for â, î, û. Point ⠠ is used for capitals.

== Punctuation ==
Punctuation and arithmetical signs are as follows:

◌̂	'	,	;	:	.	!	?	-	(space)
... ( ... )			... “ ... ”			(quote dash)		(poetry)	
*		/		+		−		=	

⠜⠜ is perhaps related to ⠜ in Irish Braille, which marks a new line of verse.

For quotations, the dash — is used differently from inverted commas “...”, for example when transcribing short turns in dialog.

== Extensions to other languages ==
Azeri (Azerbaijani) Braille adds the letters x and q with their international forms ⠭ and ⠟. These letters are used in Azeri Braille, or in the case of Turkish Braille, in foreign words. w is only used for foreign words in both Turkish and Azeri Braille. Azeri Braille uses the accent mark ⠈ to derive print ə (formerly ä) from a.

ə	x	q	w
