= Turkish copula =

Use of copulas in the Turkish language

The Turkish copula is one of the more distinct features of Turkish grammar. In Turkish, copulas are called ek-eylem (pronounced [ec ˈejlæm]) or ek-fiil (pronounced [ec fiˈil]) ('suffix-verb'). Turkish is a highly agglutinative language and copulas are rendered as suffixes, albeit with a few exceptions.

== Zero copula ==
Zero copula is the rule for third person, as in Hungarian and Russian. That means two nouns, or a noun and an adjective can be juxtaposed to make a sentence without using any copula. Third-person plural might be indicated with the use of plural suffix -lar/-ler.

| Example: | Translation: (with copula) | Literality: (Zero copula) |
| Hakan yolcu. | Hakan is a traveller. | Hakan Traveler. |
| Deniz mavi. | The sea is blue. | Sea Blue. |
| Kapılar ve camlar açık. | The doors and windows are open. | Doors and Glasses (Windows) Open. |
| Asansör bozuk. | The elevator is broken. | Elevator Broken. |
| İşçiler üzgün. | The workers are sad. | Workers Sad. |

== To be (olmak versus imek) ==
Turkish "to be" as regular/auxiliary verb (olmak) and "to be" as copula (imek) contrasts.

The auxiliary verb imek (i- is the root) shows its existence only through suffixes to predicates that can be nouns, adjectives or arguably conjugated verb stems, arguably being the only irregular verb in Turkish.

The missing forms of i- are supplied by ol-: the infinitive olmak is an example, since there is no infinitive *imek. An infinitive ermek appeared in ancient texts; its stem er- became the current i-.

The word idir, a variation of imek indicates alethic modality, so is used for emphasis, or to prevent ambiguity. İdir is an enclitic word, and exhibits vowel harmony when used as a suffix. Therefore Ali asker idir turns into Ali askerdir. In examples, emphasised word is written bold:

| Abbas yolcudur. | Abbas is a **traveller**. |
| Deniz mavidir. | The sea is **blue**. |
| Kapılar ve camlar açıktır. | The doors and windows are **open**. |
| Asansör bozuktur. | The lift is **broken**. |
| İşçiler üzgündür. | The workers are **sad**. |

== Negative copula ==
Negation is indicated by the negative copula değil. Değil is never used as a suffix, but it takes suffixes according to context.

| Abbas yolcu değil. | Abbas is not a traveller. |
| Kapılar ve camlar açık değildir. | The doors and windows are not open. |
| Öğretmen değilim. | I am not a/the teacher. |
| Mutlu değilmişiz | (Apparently) we were not happy. |

== Personal copulas ==
A complete sentence is formed by the addition of a suffix to a noun or adjective as an instance of nonverbal person agreement, with the conjugate verb "imek" only implied. These suffixes are, in origin, personal pronouns and indicate grammatical person.

Öğretmen-i-m
teacher-COP-1SG
I am a/the teacher

Öğretmen-si-n
teacher-COP-2SG
You are a/the teacher

Öğretmen
teacher
He/she/it is a/the teacher

Öğretmen-i-z
teacher-COP-1PL
We are (the) teachers

Öğretmen-si-niz
teacher-COP-2PL
You [plural/formal] are (a/the) teacher(s)

Öğretmen-ler
teacher-PL
They are (the) teachers

== Past copulas ==
Alethic past tense is indicated with idi, another variation of imek. It is enclitic and exhibits vowel harmony like idir.

Öğretmen-di-m
teacher-ALETHIC-1SG
I was a/the teacher (as I know)

Öğretmen-di-n
teacher-ALETHIC-2SG
You were a/the teacher (as I know)

Öğretmen-di
teacher-ALETHIC
He/she/it was a/the teacher (as I know)

Öğretmen-di-k
teacher-ALETHIC-1PL
We were (the) teachers (as I know)

Öğretmen-di-niz
teacher-ALETHIC-2PL
You [plural/formal] were (a/the) teacher(s) (as I know)

Öğretmen-di-ler
teacher-ALETHIC-PL
They were (the) teachers (as I know)

The inferential past tense is indicated with imiş. It is enclitic and exhibits vowel harmony like idir.

Öğretmen-miş-i-m
teacher-INFER-COP-1SG
I was a/the teacher (as I've heard)

Öğretmen-miş-si-n
teacher-INFER-COP-2SG
You were a/the teacher (as I've heard)

Öğretmen-miş
teacher-INFER
He/she/it was a/the teacher (as I've heard)

Öğretmen-miş-i-z
teacher-INFER-COP-1PL
We were (the) teachers (as I've heard)

Öğretmen-miş-si-niz
teacher-INFER-COP-2PL
You [plural/formal] were (a/the) teacher(s) (as I've heard)

Öğretmen-ler-miş
teacher-PL-INFER
They were (the) teachers (as I've heard)

== Conditional copulas ==
Conditional (hypothetical) mood is indicated with ise. It is enclitic and exhibits vowel harmony like idir.

Öğretmen-se-m
teacher-COND-1SG
If I am a/the teacher

Öğretmen-se-n
teacher-COND-2SG
If you are a/the teacher

Öğretmen-se
teacher-COND
If he/she/it is a/the teacher

Öğretmen-se-k
teacher-COND-1PL
If we are (the) teachers

Öğretmen-se-niz
teacher-COND-2PL
If you [plural/formal] are (a/the) teacher(s)

Öğretmen-ler-se
teacher-PL-COND
If they are (the) teachers
