= Turkish language =

Turkic language

Turkish
- Türkçe; Türk dili
- Pronunciation: Türkçe [ˈtyɾctʃɛ] Türk dili [ˈtyɾc dilɪ]
- Native to: Turkey (official); Northern Cyprus (official); Cyprus (official); Iraq; Syria; Lebanon; Greece; Bulgaria; Romania; Kosovo; North Macedonia; Bosnia and Herzegovina
- Region: Anatolia; Balkans; Cyprus; Mesopotamia; Levant; Transcaucasia
- Ethnicity: Turks
- Speakers: L1: 85 million (2006–2021); L2: 6.1 million (2019); Total: 91 million (2006–2021)
- Language family: Turkic: Common Turkic; Oghuz; Western; Turkish
- Early forms: Old Anatolian Turkish: Ottoman Turkish
- Standard forms: Istanbul Turkish
- Dialects: Cypriot Turkish; Iraqi Turkmen; † Karamanli Turkish; Meskhetian Turkish; Rumelian Turkish; Syrian Turkish; and Anatolian dialects
- Writing system: Latin (Turkish alphabet); Turkish Braille

Official status
- Official language in: Cyprus; Northern Cyprus; Turkey; Organization of Turkic States
- Recognised minority language in: Bosnia and Herzegovina; Greece; Iraq (Note: Turkish language is official in Kirkuk Governorate, Saladin Governorate, and Kifri districts. In addition, it is an official language in the administrative units in which they constitute density of population.); Kosovo (Note: Turkish language is currently official in Gjilan, Lipjan, Mamusha, Mitrovica, North Mitrovica, Pristina, Prizren and Vushtrri municipalities.); North Macedonia (Note: Turkish language is currently official in Centar Zupa and Plasnica Municipality); Romania
- Regulated by: Turkish Language Association

Language codes
- ISO 639-1: tr
- ISO 639-2: tur
- ISO 639-3: tur
- Glottolog: nucl1301
- Linguasphere: part of 44-AAB-a
- Countries where Turkish is an official language Countries where Turkish is recognised as a minority language Countries where Turkish is recognised as a minority language and co-official in at least one municipality

Turkish (Türkçe [ˈtyɾctʃɛ], Türk dili [ˈtyɾc dilɪ], also known as Türkiye Türkçesi 'Turkish of Turkey') is the most widely spoken of the Turkic languages, with around 90 million speakers. It is the national language of Turkey and one of two official languages of Cyprus. Significant smaller groups of Turkish speakers also exist in Germany, Austria, Bulgaria, North Macedonia, Greece, other parts of Europe, the South Caucasus, and some parts of Central Asia, Iraq, and Syria. Turkish is the 21st-most spoken language in the world.

To the west, the influence of Ottoman Turkish—the variety of the Turkish language that was used as the administrative and literary language of the Ottoman Empire—spread as the Ottoman Empire expanded. In 1928, as one of Atatürk's reforms in the early years of the Republic of Turkey, the Perso-Arabic script-based Ottoman Turkish alphabet was replaced with the Latin script-based Turkish alphabet.

Turkish grammar is characterized by extensive agglutination and is generally very regular. The basic word order is subject–object–verb. Turkish has no noun classes or grammatical gender. Other notable grammatical features include evidentiality, converbs, and a variety of tenses, aspects, and moods.

Turkish phonology is marked by vowel harmony; native words typically contain only front vowels (⟨e, i, ö, ü⟩) or only back vowels (⟨a, ı, o, u⟩), a phenomenon known as palatal harmony. In addition, certain suffixes exhibit a fourfold harmony that also includes rounding harmony among high vowels. While most suffixes agree with vowel harmony, there are some exceptions. Loanwords are not required to follow this rule.

Turkish has a word accent system that has been described as either stress- or pitch-based. Most native words are accented on the last syllable, though this can vary due to suffixes. Meanwhile, loanwords vary considerably in this regard.

Over 80% of Turkish vocabulary stems from native Turkic, with significant contributions from Ottoman-era Arabic, French, and Persian loanwords, as well as smaller contributions from Italian, Greek, and English. Many loanwords, especially those from Arabic, were replaced by Turkish coinages during the Turkish language reform due to prevailing ideas of linguistic purism.

The language makes usage of honorifics and has a strong T–V distinction which distinguishes varying levels of politeness, social distance, age, courtesy or familiarity toward the addressee. The plural second-person pronoun and verb forms can be used for referring to a single person out of respect.

== Classification ==
Turkish is a member of the Oghuz group of the Turkic family. Other members include Azerbaijani, spoken in Azerbaijan and north-west Iran, Gagauz of Gagauzia, Qashqai of south Iran, and Turkmen of Turkmenistan.

Historically, the Turkic language family was considered part of the larger Altaic language family, along with the Japanese, Korean, Mongolic, and Tungusic language families. Some linguists have also proposed including other language families.

The Altaic theory has fallen out of favour since the 1960s, and a majority of linguists now consider Turkic languages to be unrelated to any other language family, though the Altaic hypothesis still has a small degree of support from individual linguists. The nineteenth-century Ural-Altaic language theory, which grouped Turkish with Finnish, Hungarian and Altaic languages, is considered even less plausible in light of Altaic's rejection. The theory was based mostly on the fact these languages share three features: agglutination, vowel harmony and lack of grammatical gender.

== History ==
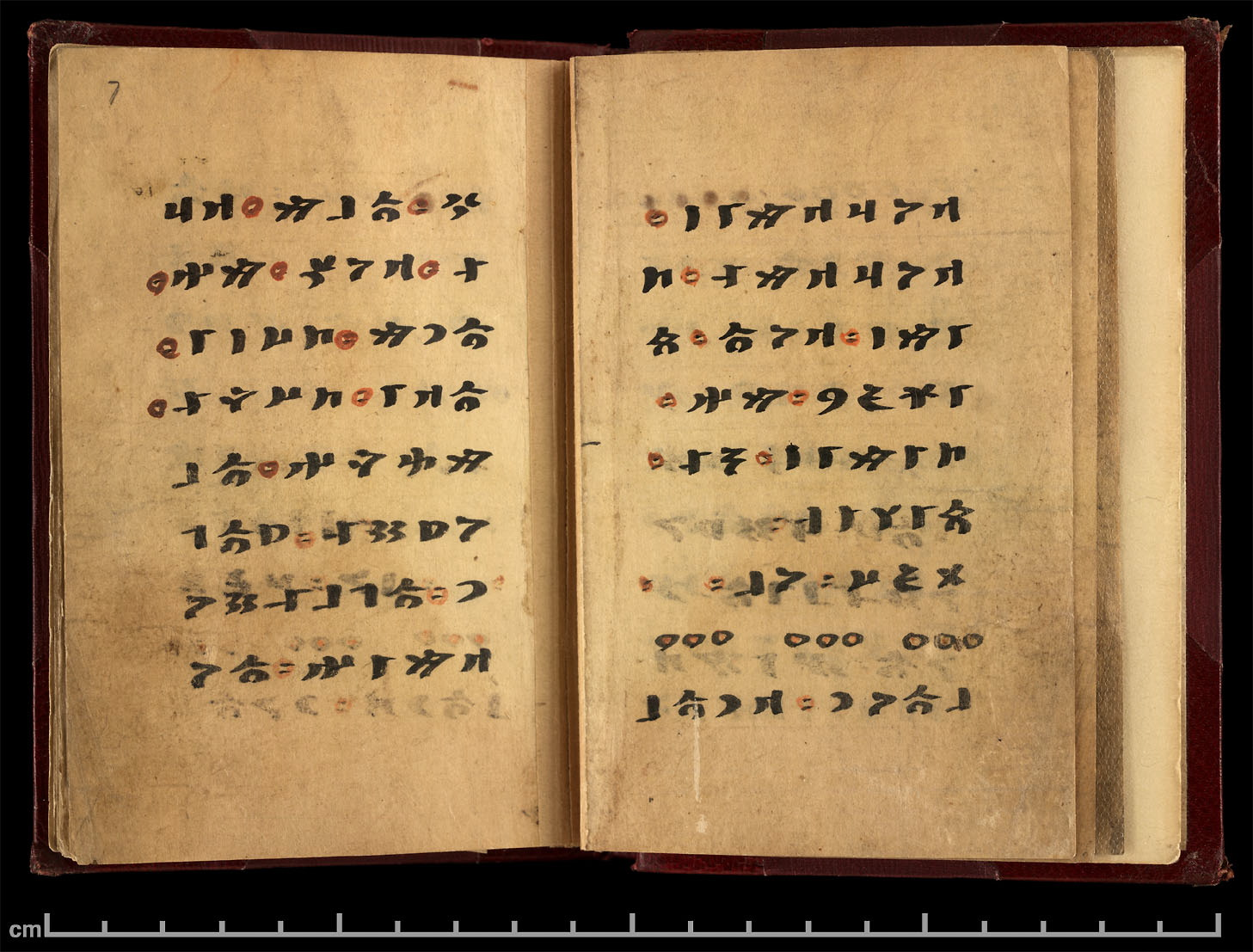
The 9th century Irk Bitig (Book of Divination)

The earliest known Old Turkic inscriptions are the three monumental Orkhon inscriptions found in modern Mongolia. Erected in honour of the prince Kul Tigin and his brother Emperor Bilge Khagan, these date back to the Second Turkic Khaganate (dated 682–744 CE). After the discovery and excavation of these monuments and associated stone slabs by Russian archaeologists in the wider area surrounding the Orkhon Valley between 1889 and 1893, it became established that the language on the inscriptions was the Old Turkic language written using the Old Turkic alphabet, which has also been referred to as "Turkic runes" or "runiform" due to a superficial similarity to the Germanic runic alphabets.

With the Turkic expansion during Early Middle Ages (c. 6th–11th centuries), peoples speaking Turkic languages spread across Central Asia, covering a vast geographical region stretching from Siberia all the way to Europe and the Mediterranean. The Seljuqs of the Oghuz Turks, in particular, brought their language, Oghuz—the direct ancestor of today's Turkish language—into Anatolia during the 11th century. Also during the 11th century, an early linguist of the Turkic languages, Mahmud al-Kashgari from the Kara-Khanid Khanate, published the first comprehensive Turkic language dictionary and map of the geographical distribution of Turkic speakers in the Dīwān Lughāt al-Turk (ديوان لغات الترك).

=== Ottoman Turkish ===
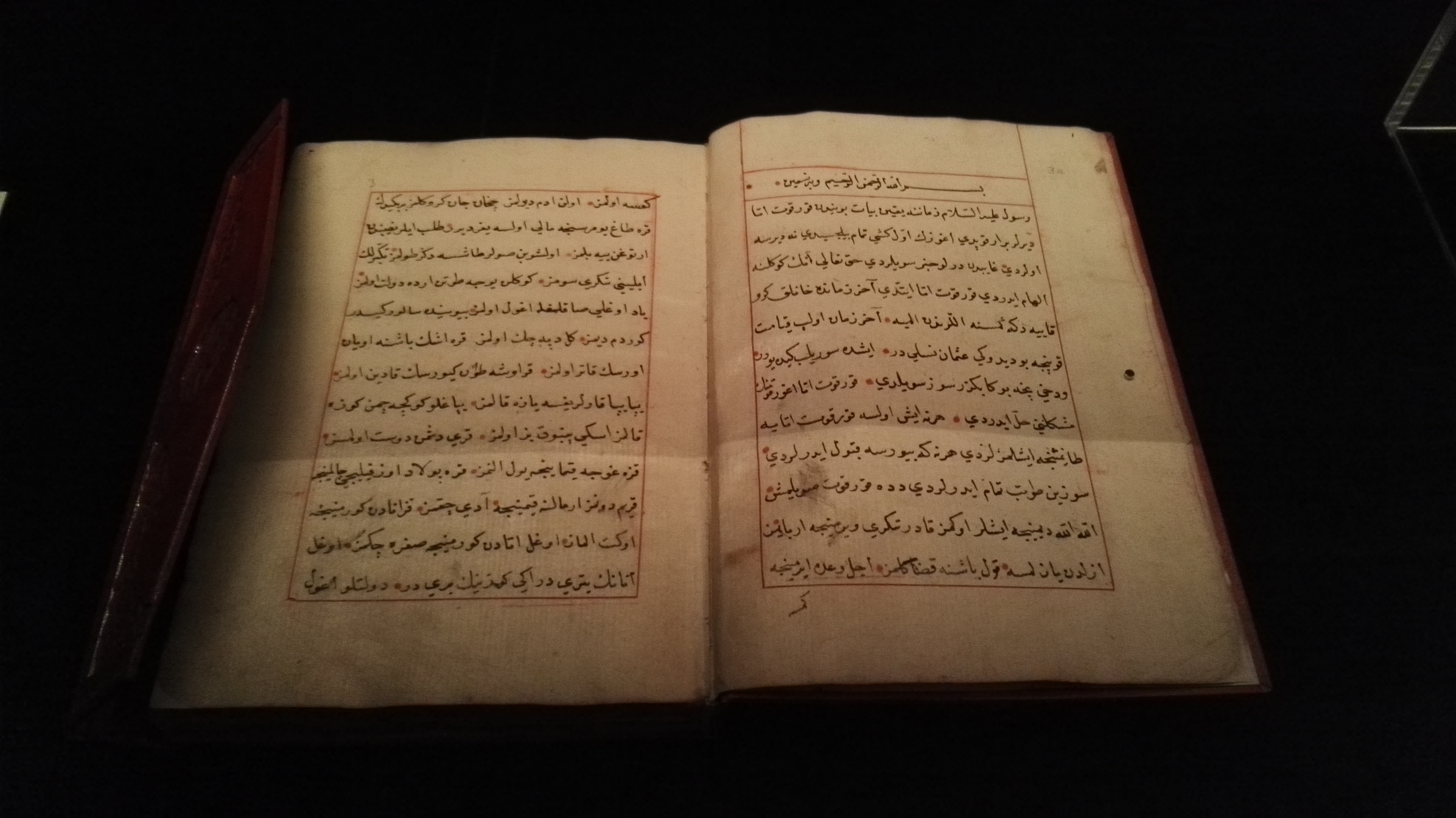
The Book of Dede Korkut (Dresden manuscript), dating to approximately the 14th or 15th century, is written in Old Anatolian Turkish

Following the adoption of Islam around the year 950 by the Kara-Khanid Khanate and the Seljuq Turks, who are both regarded as the ethnic and cultural ancestors of the Ottomans, the administrative language of these states acquired a large collection of loanwords from Arabic and Persian. Turkish literature during the Ottoman period, particularly Divan poetry, was heavily influenced by Persian, including the adoption of Persian poetic meters and a great quantity of imported Persian words. The literary and official language during the Ottoman Empire period (c. 1299–1922) is termed Ottoman Turkish, which borrowed heavily from Persian and Arabic that differed considerably from today's modern Turkish, was largely unintelligible to the period's everyday Turkish. The everyday Turkish, known as kaba Türkçe or 'vulgar Turkish', spoken by the less-educated, lower and also rural members of Ottoman society, contained a higher percentage of native vocabulary and served as the basis for the modern Turkish language.

While visiting the region between Adıyaman and Adana, Evliya Çelebi recorded the "Turkman language" and compared it with his own Turkish:

Comparison of 17th-century Southern Anatolian Turkman, 17th-century elite, and modern standard Turkish dialects
Turkman language	Ottoman Turkish	Modern Turkish	English
yalvaç	peygamber (borrowed from Persian)	peygamber (borrowed from Persian)	prophet
fakı	imâm (borrowed from Arabic)	imam (borrowed from Arabic)	imam
yüce Çalap	Âli Allah (borrowed from Arabic)	yüce Allah (borrowed from Arabic)	mighty God
eyne	câmi (borrowed from Arabic)	cami (borrowed from Arabic)	mosque
mezgit (borrowed from Persian)	mescid	mescit	mosque
gümeç, lavâşa (borrowed from Persian), pişi	ekmek	ekmek, lavaş, pişi	bread, lavash, boortsog
kekremsi	şarâb (borrowed from Arabic)	şarap (borrowed from Arabic)	wine
Kancarıdaydın?	Nerede idin?	Neredeydin?	Where were you?
Kancarı yılıgan be?	Nereye gidersin bire?	Nereye gidiyorsun?	Where are you going?
Muhıdı geyen mi?	Ferâce giyermisin? (ferâce is borrowed from Byzantine Greek)	Ferace giyer misin? (ferace is borrowed from Byzantine Greek)	Will you wear ferace?
Bargım yavıncıdı.	Karnım ağrıdı.	Karnım ağrıdı.	My stomach hurt.
şarıkdı	şehirli oldu (şehir is borrowed from Persian)	şehirli oldu (şehir is borrowed from Persian)	He/She/It became urban.

=== Language reform and modern Turkish ===
After the foundation of the modern state of Turkey and the script reform, the Turkish Language Association (TDK) was established in 1932 under the patronage of Mustafa Kemal Atatürk, with the aim of conducting research on Turkish. One of the tasks of the newly established association was to initiate a language reform to replace loanwords of Arabic and Persian origins with Turkish equivalents. (Note: See Lewis (2002) for a thorough treatment of the Turkish language reform.) By banning the usage of imported words in the press, the association succeeded in removing several hundred foreign words from the language. While most of the words introduced to the language by the TDK were newly derived from Turkic roots, it also opted for reviving Old Turkish words which had not been used for centuries. In 1935, the TDK published a bilingual Ottoman-Turkish/Pure Turkish dictionary that documents the results of the language reform.

Owing to this sudden change in the language, older and younger people in Turkey started to differ in their vocabularies. While the generations born before the 1940s tend to use the older terms of Arabic and Persian origins, the younger generations favor new expressions. After the language reform, the Turkish education system discontinued the teaching of literary Ottoman Turkish, and over time the speaking and writing ability of society atrophied to the point that later generations of Turkish speakers would perceive the speech as sounding so alien that it had to be "translated" three times into modern Turkish: first in 1963, again in 1986, and most recently in 1995. (Note: See Lewis (2002), pages 2-3. For the first two translations. For the third, see Bedi Yazıcı.)

The past few decades have seen the continuing work of the TDK to coin new Turkish words to express new concepts and technologies as they enter the language, mostly from English. Many of these new words, particularly information technology terms, have received widespread acceptance. However, the TDK is occasionally criticized for coining words which sound contrived and artificial. Some earlier changes—such as Turkic bölem to replace the Arabic-derived fırka, ("political party")—also failed to meet with popular approval (the Arabic loanword fırka has been replaced by the French loanword parti).

Some examples of modern Turkish words and the old loanwords are:

Ottoman Turkish	Modern Turkish	English translation	Ottoman etymology	Modern derivation
مثلث (müselles)	üçgen	triangle	Arabic مثلث (muthallath)	Compound of the noun üç ('three') and the suffix -gen
طیاره (tayyare)	uçak	aeroplane	Arabic طير (ṭayr), 'birds, flying'	Derived from the verb uçmak ('to fly'). The word was first proposed to mean "airport".
نسبت (nispet)	oran	ratio	Arabic نسبة (nisba(t))	The old word is still used in the language today together with the new one. The modern word is from the Old Turkic verb or- ('to cut').
شمال (şimal)	kuzey	north	Persian شمال (šomâl), 'north'	Derived from the Old Turkic noun kuz ('cold and dark place', 'shadow'). The word is restored from Middle Turkic usage.
تشرینِ اول (teşrinievvel)	ekim	October	Arabic تشرين الأول (tišrīn al-'awwal), 'autumn' + 'the first [month of]'	The noun ekim means 'sowing', referring to the planting of cereal seeds in autumn, which is widespread in Turkey

== Geographic distribution ==
Turkish is natively spoken by the Turkish people in Turkey and by the Turkish diaspora in some 30 other countries. The Turkish language is mutually intelligible with Azerbaijani. In particular, Turkish-speaking minorities exist in countries that formerly (in whole or part) belonged to the Ottoman Empire, such as Iraq, Bulgaria, Cyprus, Greece (primarily in Western Thrace), the Republic of North Macedonia, Romania, and Serbia. More than two million Turkish speakers live in Germany; and there are significant Turkish-speaking communities in the United States, France, the Netherlands, Austria, Belgium, Switzerland, and the United Kingdom. Due to the cultural assimilation of Turkish immigrants in host countries, not all ethnic members of the diaspora speak the language with native fluency. (Note: See for example citations given in Cindark, Ibrahim/Aslan, Sema (2004).)

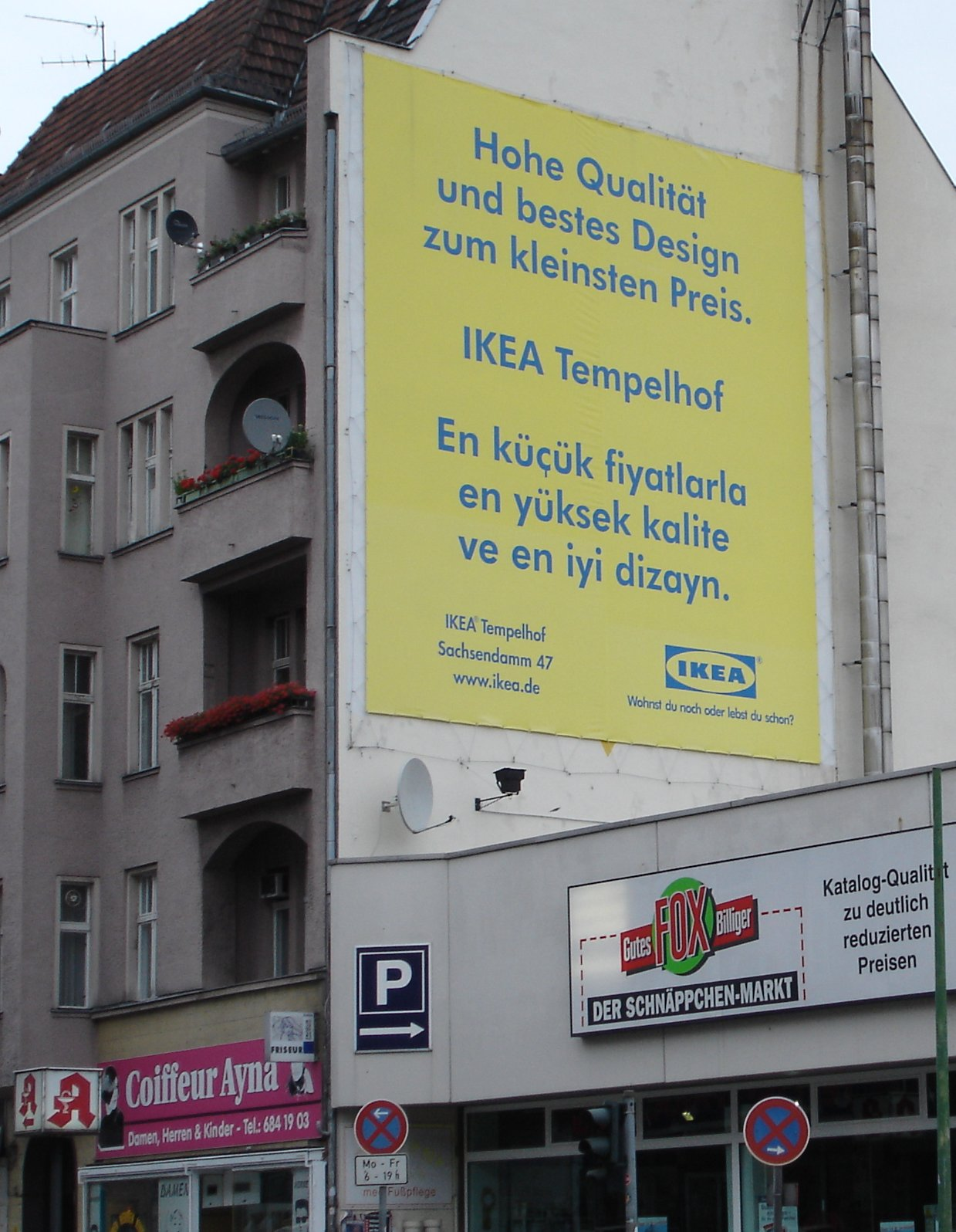
An advertisement by the IKEA branch in Berlin written in the German and Turkish languages.

In 2005, 93% of the population of Turkey were native speakers of Turkish, about 67 million at the time, with Kurdish languages making up most of the remainder.

Azerbaijani is the official language of Azerbaijan and is mutually intelligible with Turkish. Speakers of the two languages can usually understand each other, particularly in everyday conversations. Turkey and Azerbaijan have very good relations, and many Turkish companies and government agencies invest in Azerbaijan. Consequently, Turkey exerts significant influence over Azerbaijan. However, the growing presence of Turkish in Azerbaijan, coupled with the tendency of many children to use Turkish words instead of Azerbaijani ones due to satellite TV, has raised concerns that the unique characteristics of Azerbaijani may be eroded. Many bookstores sell Turkish books alongside Azerbaijani ones. Agalar Mahmadov, a leading intellectual, has expressed concern that Turkish has "already started to take over the national and natural dialects of Azerbaijan." Nevertheless, Turkish is not as prevalent as Russian as a foreign language.

=== Official status ===
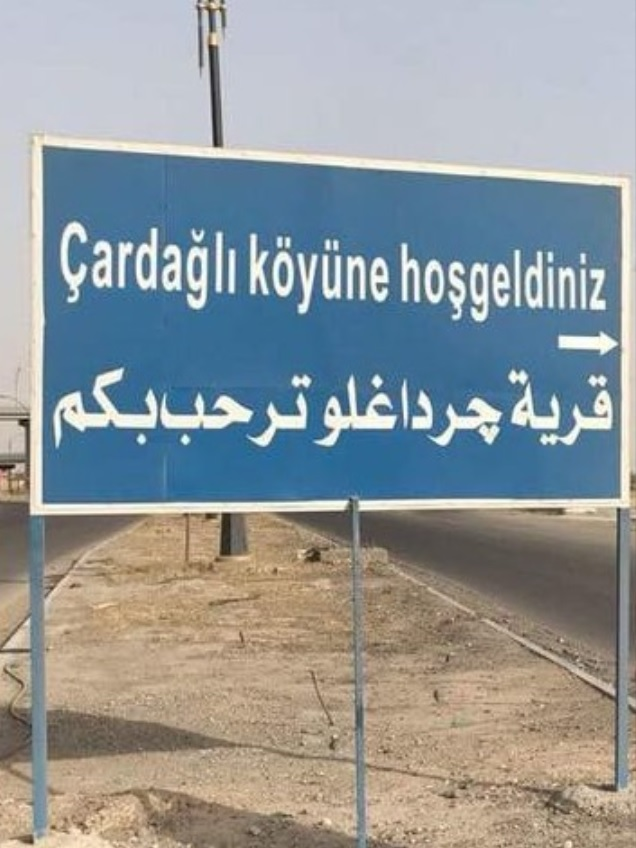
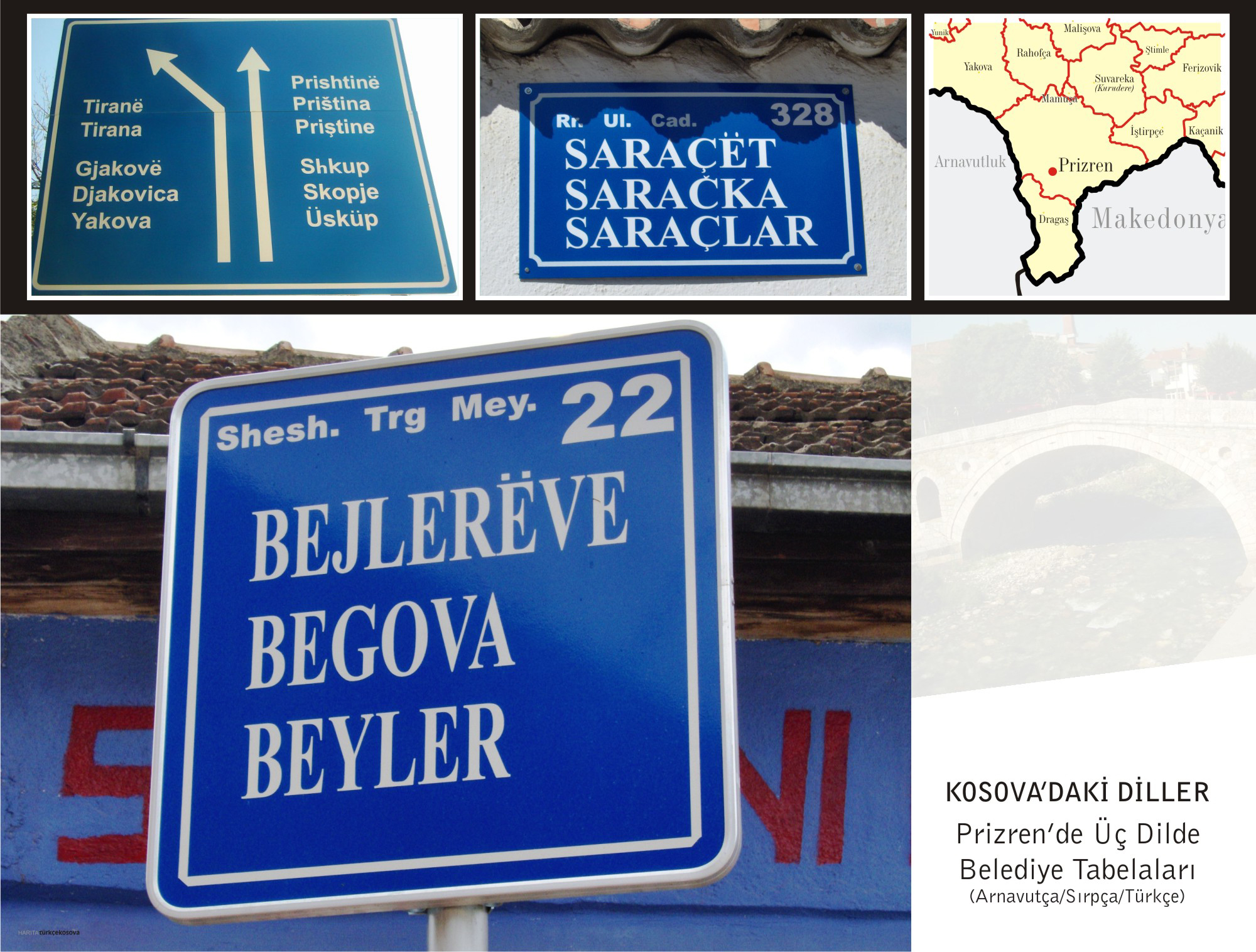
Left: Bilingual sign, Turkish (top) and Arabic (bottom), at a Turkmen village in Kirkuk Governorate, Iraq.
Right: Road signs in Prizren, Kosovo. Official languages are: Albanian (top), Serbian (middle) and Turkish (bottom).

Turkish is the official language of Turkey and is one of the official languages of Cyprus. Turkish has official status in 38 municipalities in Kosovo, including Mamusha,, two in the Republic of North Macedonia and two in Iraq. Cyprus has requested the European Union to add Turkish as an official language, as it is one of the two official languages of the country.

In Turkey, the regulatory body for Turkish is the Turkish Language Association (Türk Dil Kurumu or TDK), which was founded in 1932 under the name Türk Dili Tetkik Cemiyeti ("Society for Research on the Turkish Language"). The Turkish Language Association was influenced by the ideology of linguistic purism: indeed one of its primary tasks was the replacement of loanwords and of foreign grammatical constructions with equivalents of Turkish origin. (Note: The name TDK itself exemplifies this process. The words tetkik and cemiyet in the original name are both Arabic loanwords (the final -i of cemiyeti being a Turkish possessive suffix); kurum is a native Turkish word based on the verb kurmak, "set up, found".) These changes, together with the adoption of the new Turkish alphabet in 1928, shaped the modern Turkish language spoken today. The TDK became an independent body in 1951, with the lifting of the requirement that it should be presided over by the Minister of Education. This status continued until August 1983, when it was again made into a governmental body in the constitution of 1982, following the military coup d'état of 1980.

== Dialects ==
Standard Turkish is based on the dialect of Istanbul. This Istanbul Turkish (İstanbul Türkçesi) constitutes the model of written and spoken Turkish, as recommended by Ziya Gökalp, Ömer Seyfettin and others.

Dialectal variation persists, in spite of the levelling influence of the standard used in mass media and in the Turkish education system since the 1930s. Academic researchers from Turkey often refer to Turkish dialects as ağız or şive, leading to an ambiguity with the linguistic concept of accent, which is also covered with these words. Several universities, as well as a dedicated work-group of the Turkish Language Association, carry out projects investigating Turkish dialects. As of 2002 work continued on the compilation and publication of their research as a comprehensive dialect-atlas of the Turkish language. Although the Ottoman alphabet, being more phonetically ambiguous than the Latin script, encoded for many of the dialectal variations between Turkish dialects, the modern Latin script fails to do this. Examples of this are the presence of the nasal velar sound [ŋ] in certain eastern dialects of Turkish which was represented by the Ottoman letter ⟨ڭ⟩ but that was merged into ⟨n⟩ in the Latin script. Additionally are letters such as ⟨خ ,ق ,غ⟩ which make the sounds [ɣ], [q], and [x], respectively in certain eastern dialects but that are merged into [g], [k], and [h] in western dialects and are therefore defectively represented in the Latin alphabet for speakers of eastern dialects.

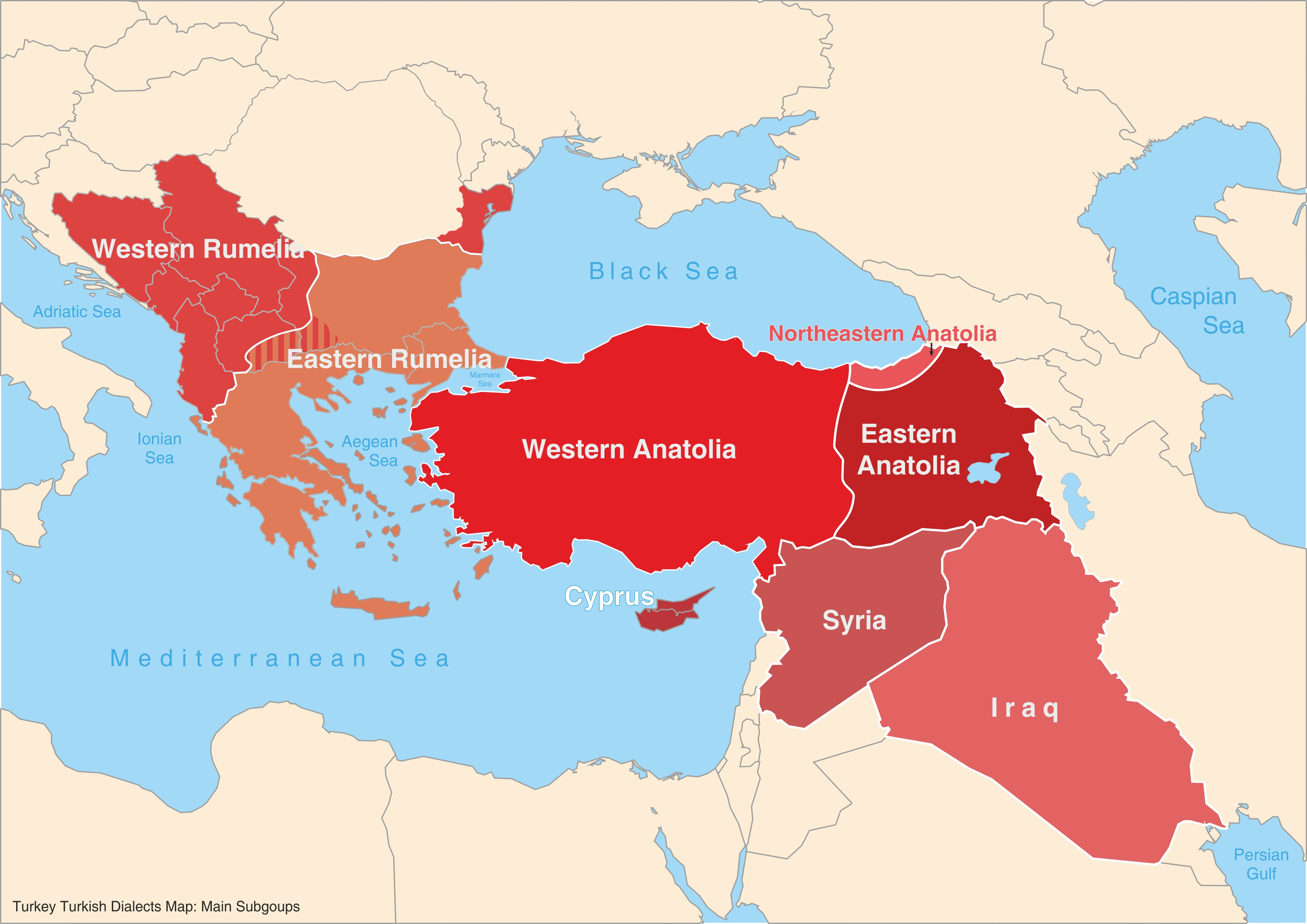
Map of the main subgroups of Turkish dialects across Southeast Europe and the Middle East.

Some immigrants to Turkey from Rumelia speak Rumelian Turkish, which includes the distinct dialects of Ludogorie, Dinler, and Adakale, which show the influence of the theorized Balkan sprachbund. Kıbrıs Türkçesi is the name for Cypriot Turkish and is spoken by the Turkish Cypriots. Edirne is the dialect of Edirne. Ege is spoken in the Aegean region, with its usage extending to Antalya. The nomadic Yörüks of the Mediterranean Region of Turkey also have their own dialect of Turkish. This group is not to be confused with the Yuruk nomads of Macedonia, Greece, and European Turkey, who speak Balkan Gagauz Turkish.

The Meskhetian Turks who live in Kazakhstan, Azerbaijan and Russia as well as in several Central Asian countries, also speak an Eastern Anatolian dialect of Turkish, originating in the areas of Kars, Ardahan, Artvin, Diyarbakır and Erzurum and sharing similarities with Azerbaijani, the language of Azerbaijan.

The Central Anatolia Region speaks Orta Anadolu. Karadeniz, spoken in the Eastern Black Sea Region and represented primarily by the Trabzon dialect, exhibits substratum influence from Greek in phonology and syntax; it is also known as Laz dialect (not to be confused with the Laz language). Kastamonu is spoken in Kastamonu and its surrounding areas. Karamanli Turkish (Greek: Kαραμανλήδικα) is an extinct dialect that was spoken in what is now Karaman. It was the literary standard for the Karamanlides.

== Phonology ==
=== Consonants ===
Consonant phonemes of Standard Turkish
		Labial	Dental/ Alveolar	Post- alveolar	Palatal	Velar	Glottal
Nasal		m	n				
Stop	voiceless	p	t	t͡ʃ	(c)	k	
Stop	voiced	b	d	d͡ʒ	(ɟ)	ɡ	
Fricative	voiceless	f	s	ʃ			h
Fricative	voiced	v	z	ʒ			
Approximant		v	(ɫ)	l	j	(ɰ)	
Tap			ɾ				

The phoneme that is usually referred to as yumuşak g ("soft g"), written ⟨ğ⟩ in Turkish orthography, represents a vowel sequence or a rather weak bilabial approximant between rounded vowels, a weak palatal approximant between unrounded front vowels, and a vowel sequence elsewhere. It never occurs at the beginning of a word or a syllable, but always follows a vowel. When word-final or preceding another consonant, it lengthens the preceding vowel.

In native Turkic words, the sounds [c], [ɟ], and [l] are mainly in complementary distribution with [k], [ɡ], and [ɫ]; the former set occurs adjacent to front vowels and the latter adjacent to back vowels. The distribution of these phonemes is often unpredictable, however, in foreign borrowings and proper nouns. In such words, [c], [ɟ], and [l] often occur with back vowels: some examples are given below. However, there are minimal pairs that distinguish between these sounds, such as kar /kaɾ/ "snow" vs kâr /caɾ/ "profit".

==== Consonant voicedness ====
Turkish orthography reflects final-obstruent devoicing, a form of consonant mutation whereby the voiced obstruents /b d d͡ʒ ɡ/ are devoiced to /p t t͡ʃ k/ at the end of a word. At least one source claims Turkish consonants are laryngeally-specified three-way fortis-lenis (aspirated/neutral/voiced) like Armenian, though they only appear this way at the end of a syllable or at the start of certain suffixes, where they can interact with other morphemes. Some words end in an underlying voiced consonant that remains voiced at the end of the word. Similarly, suffixes beginning with a voiced consonant become voiceless only after a word ending in an underlying "aspirated" consonant. Other words, such as kanat ("wing") end in an underlying "neutral" consonant that becomes devoiced only at the end of a word. Certain words and suffixes such as sanat ("art") and the relative suffix -ki contain an underlying "aspirated" stop that does not voice between vowels. (Note: /g/ always becomes the phonetically zero ⟨ğ⟩ between vowels across morpheme boundaries.)

"Voiced" stops
Underlying consonant	Underlying form	Dictionary form	Dative case	Meaning
b	*ad	ad	ada	name
c	*sac	sac	saca	sheet metal
d	*od	od	oda	fire (archaic)
g	*alg	alg	alge	algae (loan)
g	*psikolog	psikolog	psikoloğa	psychologist (loan)

"Neutral" stops
Underlying consonant	Voiced form	Underlying form	Dictionary form	Dative case / 1sg present	Meaning
p	b	*kitab	kitap	kitaba	book (loan)
ç	c	*uc	uç	uca	tip
t	d	*kanad	kanat	kanada	wing
k	g	*reng	renk	renge	color (loan)
k	g	*ekmeg	ekmek	ekmeğe	bread

"Aspirated" stops
Underlying consonant	Underlying form	Dictionary form	Dative case / 1sg present	Meaning
pʰ	*sap	sap	sapa	stem
çʰ	*saç	saç	saçı	hair
tʰ	*but	but	buta	thigh
kʰ	*bank	bank	banka	bench (loan)
kʰ	*hukuk	hukuk	hukuka	law (loan)

Native nouns of two or more syllables that end in /k/ in dictionary form are nearly all /g/ in underlying form. However, most verbs and monosyllabic nouns are underlyingly /k/.

=== Vowels ===
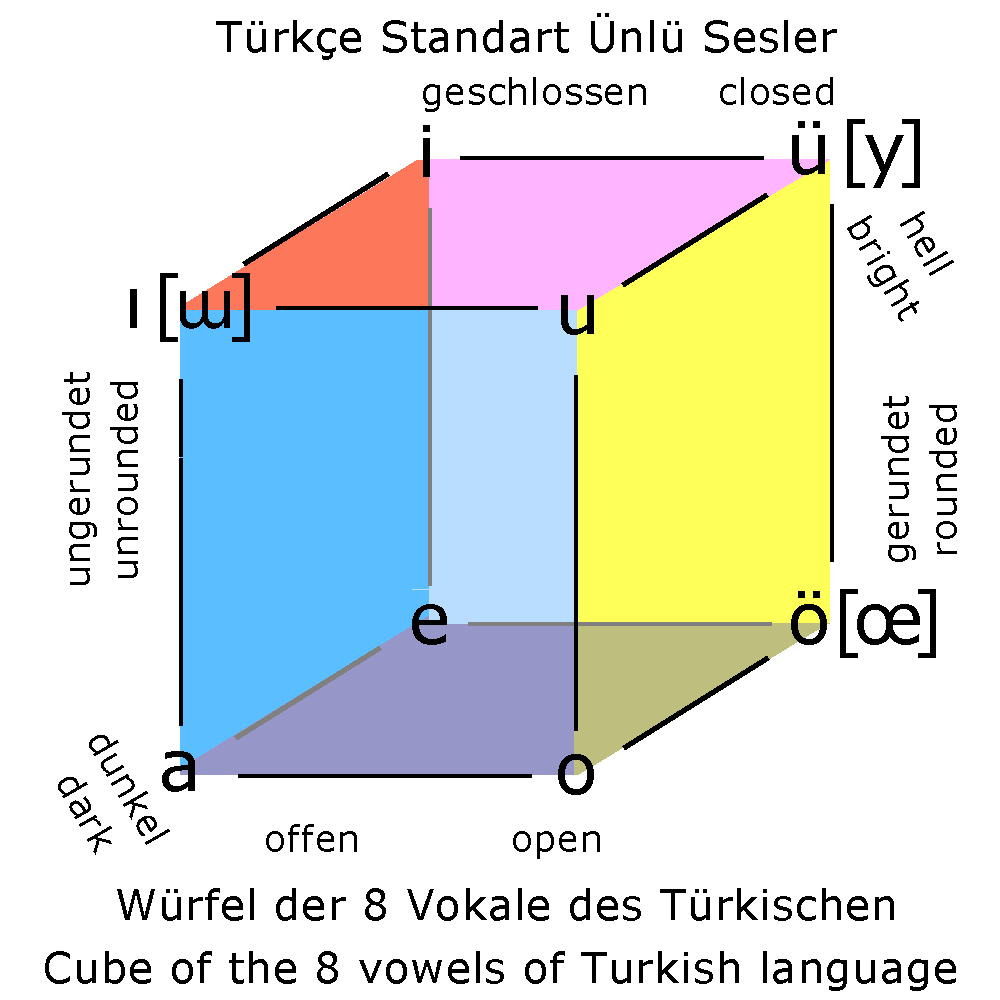
Vowels of Turkish.

The vowels of the Turkish language are, in their alphabetical order, ⟨a⟩, ⟨e⟩, ⟨ı⟩, ⟨i⟩, ⟨o⟩, ⟨ö⟩, ⟨u⟩, ⟨ü⟩. (Note: The vowel represented by ⟨ı⟩ is also commonly transcribed as ⟨ɨ⟩ in linguistic literature.) The Turkish vowel system can be considered as being three-dimensional, where vowels are characterised by how and where they are articulated focusing on three key features: front and back, rounded and unrounded and vowel height. Vowels are classified [±back], [±round] and [±high].

The only vowels in hiatus in the language are found in loanwords (Note: This does not include vowels that came into contact with each other due to the loss of /ɣ/ (⟨ğ⟩, such as in soğan ("onion").) and may be categorised as falling diphthongs usually analyzed as a sequence of /j/ and a vowel.

==== Vowel harmony ====
	Front Vowels				Back Vowels			
	Unrounded		Rounded		Unrounded		Rounded	
Vowel	e /e/	i /i/	ü /y/	ö /œ/	a /ɑ/	ı /ɯ/	u /u/	o /o/
Twofold (Backness)	e				a			
Fourfold (Backness + Rounding)	i		ü		ı		u	

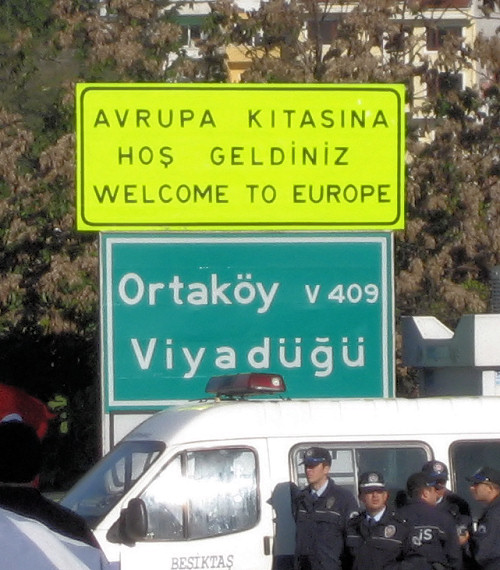
Road sign at the European end of the Bosphorus Bridge in Istanbul.

The principle of vowel harmony, which permeates Turkish word-formation and suffixation, is due to the natural human tendency towards economy of muscular effort. This principle is expressed in Turkish through three rules:

1. If the first vowel of a word is a back vowel, any subsequent vowel is also a back vowel; if the first is a front vowel, any subsequent vowel is also a front vowel.
2. If the first vowel is unrounded, so too are subsequent vowels.
3. If the first vowel is rounded, subsequent vowels are either rounded and close or unrounded and open.

The second and third rules minimize muscular effort during speech. More specifically, they are related to the phenomenon of labial assimilation: if the lips are rounded (a process that requires muscular effort) for the first vowel they may stay rounded for subsequent vowels. If they are unrounded for the first vowel, the speaker does not make the additional muscular effort to round them subsequently.

Grammatical affixes have "a chameleon-like quality", and obey one of the following patterns of vowel harmony:

- twofold (-e/-a): (Note: For the terms twofold and fourfold, as well as the superscript notation, see Lewis (1953), pages 21-22.) In his more recent works Lewis prefers to omit the superscripts, on the grounds that "there is no need for this once the principle has been grasped" (Lewis [2001]). The locative case suffix, for example, is -de after front vowels and -da after back vowels. The notation -de² is a convenient shorthand for this pattern.
- fourfold (-i/-ı/-ü/-u): the genitive case suffix, for example, is -in or -ın after unrounded vowels (front or back respectively); and -ün or -un after the corresponding rounded vowels. In this case, the shorthand notation -in^{4} is used.

Practically, the twofold pattern (also referred to as the e-type vowel harmony) means that in the environment where the vowel in the word stem is formed in the front of the mouth, the suffix will take the e-form, while if it is formed in the back it will take the a-form. The fourfold pattern (also called the i-type) accounts for rounding as well as for front/back. The following examples, based on the copula -dir^{4} ("[it] is"), illustrate the principles of i-type vowel harmony in practice: Türkiye'dir ("it is Turkey"), (Note: In modern Turkish orthography, an apostrophe is used to separate proper names from any suffixes.) kapıdır ("it is a door"), but gündür ("it is day"), paltodur ("it is a coat").

===== Exceptions to vowel harmony =====
These are four word-classes that are exceptions to the rules of vowel harmony:

1. Native, non-compound words, e.g. dahi ("also"), ela ("light brown"), elma ("apple") hangi ("which"), hani ("where"), inanmak ("to believe"), kardeş ("sibling"), şişman ("fat"), anne ("mother")
2. Native compound words, e.g. bugün ("today"), dedikodu ("gossip"), haydi ("come on")
3. Foreign words, e.g. ferman (< Farsi فرماندهی ("command")), mikrop (< French microbe ("microbe")), piskopos (< Greek επίσκοπος ("bishop"))
4. Invariable suffixes: –yor (present tense suffix), –ane (turning adjectives or nouns into adverbs), –ken ("while"), –imtırak (weakening an adjective of color or taste in a way similar to the English suffix –ish as in blueish), –ki (making a pronoun or adjective out of an adverb or a noun), –gil ("the house or family of"), –gen (the polygon suffix -gon) (Note: For sourcing of the meanings of these suffixes, see Lewis 2001 pages 61, 55, 62, 66, 106, 189, and 223.)

Invariable suffix	Turkish example	Meaning in English	Remarks
–yor	geliyor	"he/she/it is coming"	From gel– "to come."
–ane	şahane	"regal"	From şah, "king."
–ken	uyurken	"while sleeping"	From uyu–, "to sleep."
–leyin	sabahleyin	"in the morning"	From sabah, "morning."
–imtırak	ekşimtırak	"sourish"	From ekşi, "sour."
–ki	ormandaki	"(that) in the forest"	From orman, "forest."
–gil	annemgiller	"my mother's family"	From annem, "my mother."
–gen	altıgen	"hexagon"	From altı, "six."

The road sign in the photograph above illustrates several of these features:

- a native compound which does not obey vowel harmony: Ortaköy < (Orta + köy) ("middle village"—a place name)
- a loanword also violating vowel harmony: viyadük (French viaduc ("viaduct"))
- the possessive suffix -i^{4} harmonizing with the final vowel (and softening the /k/ by consonant alternation): viyadüğü

The rules of vowel harmony may vary by regional dialect. Old Anatolian Turkish had a reduced form of this feature and lacked rounding harmony. The Trabzon dialect in northeastern Turkey still exhibits this feature today. Additionally, this dialect lacks the vowels /y/ (⟨ü⟩) and /ɯ/ (⟨ı⟩), so front-back harmony is absent. In Old Anatolian Turkish, the second-person singular possessive suffix harmonized with the preceding vowel, appearing as either -ün or -un. For example, elün means "your hand," and kitabun means "your book." However, the absence of the ⟨ü⟩ vowel in the Trabzon dialect means that the un form is used in both cases: elun and kitabun.

== Word-accent ==
With the exceptions stated below, Turkish words are oxytone (accented on the last syllable).

=== Exceptions to word-accent rules ===
1. Place-names are not oxytone: Anádolu (Anatolia), İstánbul. Most place names are accented on their first syllable as in Páris. This holds true when place names are spelled the same way as common nouns, which are oxytone: mısír (maize), Mísır (Egypt), sirkecı̇́ (vinegar-seller), Sı̇́rkeci (district in Istanbul), bebék (doll, baby), Bébek (district in Istanbul), ordú (army), Órdu (a Turkish city on the Black Sea).
2. Foreign nouns usually retain their original accentuation, e.g., lokánta (< Italian locanda "restaurant"), gazéte (< Italian gazzetta "newspaper")
3. Some words about family members and living creatures have irregular accentuation: ánne (mother), görúmce (husband's sister), çekı̇́rge (grasshopper), karínca (ant), kokárca (skunk)
4. Adverbs are usually accented on the first syllable, e.g., şı̇́mdi (now), sónra (after), ánsızın (suddenly), gérçekten (really), (but gerçektén (from reality)), kíşın (during winter)
5. Compound words are accented on the end of the first element, e.g., çırílçıplak (stark naked), bakán (minister), báşbakan (prime minister)
6. Diminutives constructed by suffix –cik are accented on the first syllable, e.g., úfacık (very tiny)
7. Words with enclitic suffixes, –le (meaning "with"), –ken (meaning "while"), –ce (creating an adverb), –leyin (meaning "in" or "during"), –me (negating the verbal stem), –yor (denoting the present tense)

Enclitic suffix	Turkish example	Meaning in English
–le (ile)	memnuniyétle	with pleasure
–ken (u-qa-en)	yazárken	while writing
–ce (ça)	hayvánca	bestially
–leyin (ile-aynı-en	gecéleyin	by night
–me (ma)	anlámadı	he/she/it did not understand
–yor (i-yor)	gelı̇́yor	he/she/it is coming

- Enclitic words, which shift the accentuation to the previous syllable, e.g., ol- (meaning to be), mi (denoting a question), gibi (meaning similar to), için (for), ki (that), de (too)

Enclitic suffix	Turkish example	Meaning in English
idi as a separate word	arkadaşím idi	he/she was my friend
idi as a suffix	arkadaşímdı	he/she was my friend
mi	anlamadí mı	did he/she not understand?
gibi	sizı̇́n gibi	like you
için	benı̇́m için	for me
ki	diyorlár ki ólmayacak	they are saying that it won't happen
de	biz de	us too

== Syntax ==
=== Sentence groups ===
Turkish has two groups of sentences: verbal and nominal sentences. In the case of a verbal sentence, the predicate is a finite verb, while the predicate in nominal sentence will have either no overt verb or a verb in the form of the copula ol or y (variants of "be"). Examples of both are given below:

Sentence type	Turkish		English
	Subject	Predicate	
Verbal	Necla	okula gitti	Necla went to school
Nominal (no verb)	Necla	öğretmen	Necla is a teacher
(copula)	Necla	ev-de-y-miş (hyphens delineate suffixes)	Apparently Necla is/was at home

==== Negation ====
The two groups of sentences have different ways of forming negation. A nominal sentence can be negated with the addition of the word değil. For example, the sentence above would become Necla öğretmen değil ('Necla is not a teacher'). However, the verbal sentence requires the addition of a negative suffix -me to the verb (the suffix comes after the stem but before the tense): Necla okula gitmedi ('Necla did not go to school').

==== Yes/no questions ====
In the case of a verbal sentence, an interrogative clitic mi is added after the verb and stands alone, for example Necla okula gitti mi? ('Did Necla go to school?'). In the case of a nominal sentence, then mi comes after the predicate but before the personal ending, so for example Necla, siz öğretmen misiniz? ('Necla, are you [formal, plural] a teacher?').

=== Word order ===
Word order in simple Turkish sentences is generally subject–object–verb, as in Korean and Latin, but unlike English, for verbal sentences and subject-predicate for nominal sentences. However, as Turkish possesses a case-marking system, and most grammatical relations are shown using morphological markers, often the SOV structure has diminished relevance and may vary. The SOV structure may thus be considered a "pragmatic word order" of language, one that does not rely on word order for grammatical purposes.

==== Immediately preverbal ====
Consider the following simple sentence which demonstrates that the focus in Turkish is on the element that immediately precedes the verb:

Word order	Example	Focus
SOV	Ahmet yumurta-yı yedi Ahmet egg.ACC ate Ahmet ate the egg	unmarked
SVO	Ahmet yedi yumurta-yı Ahmet ate egg.ACC; Ahmet ate the egg	the focus is on the subject: Ahmet (it was Ahmet who ate the egg)
OVS	Yumurta-yı yedi Ahmet egg.ACC ate Ahmet; Ahmet ate the egg	the focus is on the object: egg (it was an egg that Ahmet ate)

==== Postpredicate ====
The postpredicate position signifies what is referred to as background information in Turkish—information that is assumed to be known to both the speaker and the listener, or information that is included in the context. Consider the following examples:

Sentence type	Word order		
Nominal	S-predicate	Bu ev güzelmiş (apparently this house is beautiful)	unmarked
	Predicate-s	Güzelmiş bu ev (it is apparently beautiful, this house)	it is understood that the sentence is about this house
Verbal	SOV	Bana da bir kahve getir (get me a coffee too)	unmarked
		Bana da getir bir kahve (get me one too, a coffee)	it is understood that it is a coffee that the speaker wants

==== Topic ====
There has been some debate among linguists whether Turkish is a subject-prominent (like English) or topic-prominent (like Japanese and Korean) language, with recent scholarship implying that it is indeed both subject and topic-prominent. This has direct implications for word order as it is possible for the subject to be included in the verb-phrase in Turkish. There can be S/O inversion in sentences where the topic is of greater importance than the subject.

== Grammar ==
Turkish is an agglutinative language and frequently uses affixes, and specifically suffixes, or endings. (Note: This section draws heavily on Lewis (2001) and, to a lesser extent, Lewis (1953). Only the most important references are specifically flagged with footnotes.) One word can have many affixes and these can also be used to create new words, such as creating a verb from a noun, or a noun from a verbal root (see the section on Word formation). Most affixes indicate the grammatical function of the word. The only native prefixes are alliterative intensifying syllables used with adjectives or adverbs: for example sımsıcak ("boiling hot" < sıcak) and masmavi ("bright blue" < mavi). (Note: "The prefix, which is accented, is modelled on the first syllable of the simple adjective or adverb but with the substitution of m, p, r, or s for the last consonant of that syllable. The prefix retains the first vowel of the base form and thus exhibits a form of reverse vowel harmony.)

The extensive use of affixes can give rise to long words, e.g. Çekoslovakyalılaştıramadıklarımızdanmışsınızcasına, meaning "In the manner of you being one of those that we apparently couldn't manage to convert to Czechoslovak". While this case is contrived, long words frequently occur in normal Turkish, as in this heading of a newspaper obituary column: Bayramlaşamadıklarımız (Bayram [festival]-Recipr-Impot-Partic-Plur-PossPl1; "Those of our number with whom we cannot exchange the season's greetings"). (Note: This "splendid word" appeared at the time of Bayram, the festival marking the end of the month of fasting.) Another example can be seen in the final word of this heading of the online Turkish Spelling Guide (İmlâ Kılavuzu): Dilde birlik, ulusal birliğin vazgeçilemezlerindendir ("Unity in language is among the indispensables [dispense-Pass-Impot-Plur-PossS3-Abl-Copula] of national unity ~ Linguistic unity is a sine qua non of national unity").

=== Nouns ===
==== Gender ====
Turkish does not have grammatical gender and the sex of a person does not affect the forms of words. The third-person pronoun o may refer to "he", "she" or "it." Despite this lack, Turkish still has ways of indicating gender in nouns:

1. Most domestic animals have male and female forms, e.g., aygır ("stallion"), kısrak ("mare"), boğa ("bull"), inek ("cow").
2. For other animals, the sex may be indicated by adding the word erkek ("male") or dişi ("female") before the corresponding noun, e.g., dişi kedi ("female cat").
3. For people, the female sex may be indicated by adding the word kız ("girl") or kadın ("woman"), e.g., kadın kahraman ("heroine") instead of kahraman ("hero").
4. Some foreign words of French or Arabic origin already have separate female forms, e.g., aktris ("actress"), kâtibe ("female clerk").
5. The Serbo-Croat feminine suffix –ica is used in three borrowings: kraliçe (queen), imparatoriçe ("empress") and çariçe ("tsarina"). This suffix was also used in the neologism tanrıça ("goddess") (< tanrı ("god")).

==== Case ====
There is no definite article in Turkish, but definiteness of the object is implied when the accusative ending is used (see below). Turkish nouns decline by taking case endings. There are six noun cases in Turkish, with all the endings following vowel harmony (shown in the table using the shorthand superscript notation). Since the postposition ile often gets suffixed onto the noun, some analyze it as an instrumental case, although in formal speech it takes the genitive with personal pronouns, singular demonstratives, and interrogative kim. The plural marker -ler ² immediately follows the noun before any case or other affixes (e.g. köylerin "of the villages").

Case	Ending	Examples		Meaning
Case	Ending	köy "village"	ağaç "tree"	Meaning
Nominative	∅ (none)	köy	ağaç	(the) village/tree
Accusative	-i ^{4}	köyü	ağacı	the village/tree
Genitive	-in ^{4}	köyün	ağacın	the village's/tree's of the village/tree
Dative	-e ²	köye	ağaca	to the village/tree
Locative	-de ²	köyde	ağaçta	in/on/at the village/tree
Ablative	-den ²	köyden	ağaçtan	from the village/tree
Instrumental	-le ²	köyle	ağaçla	with the village/tree

The accusative case marker is used only for definite objects; compare (bir) ağaç gördük "we saw a tree" with ağacı gördük "we saw the tree". (Note: Because it is also used for the indefinite accusative, Lewis uses the term "absolute case" in preference to "nominative".) The plural marker -ler ² is generally not used when a class or category is meant: ağaç gördük can equally well mean "we saw trees [as we walked through the forest]"—as opposed to ağaçları gördük "we saw the trees [in question]".

The declension of ağaç illustrates two important features of Turkish phonology: consonant assimilation in suffixes (ağaçtan, ağaçta) and voicing of final consonants before vowels (ağacın, ağaca, ağacı).

Additionally, nouns can take suffixes that assign person: for example -imiz ^{4}, "our". With the addition of the copula (for example -im ^{4}, "I am") complete sentences can be formed. The interrogative particle mi ^{4} immediately follows the word being questioned, and also follows vowel harmony: köye mi? "[going] to the village?", ağaç mı? "[is it a] tree?".

Turkish	English
ev	(the) house
evler	(the) houses
evin	your (sing.) house
eviniz	your (pl./formal) house
evim	my house
evimde	at my house
evlerinizin	of your houses
evlerinizden	from your houses
evlerinizdendi	(he/she/it) was from your houses
evlerinizdenmiş	(he/she/it) was (apparently/said to be) from your houses
Evinizdeyim.	I am at your house.
Evinizdeymişim.	I was (apparently) at your house.
Evinizde miyim?	Am I at your house?

=== Personal pronouns ===
The Turkish personal pronouns in the nominative case are ben (1s), sen (2s), o (3s), biz (1pl), siz (2pl, or 2h), and onlar (3pl). They are declined regularly with some exceptions: benim (1s gen.); bizim (1pl gen.); bana (1s dat.); sana (2s dat.); and the oblique forms of o use the root on. As mentioned before, all demonstrative singular and personal pronouns take the genitive when ile is affixed onto it: benimle (1s ins.), bizimle (1pl ins.); but onunla (3s ins.), onlarla (3pl ins.). All other pronouns (reflexive kendi and so on) are declined regularly.

==== Noun phrases (tamlama) ====
Two nouns, or groups of nouns, may be joined in either of two ways:

- definite (possessive) compound (belirtili tamlama). E.g. Türkiye'nin sesi "the voice of Turkey (radio station)": the voice belonging to Turkey. Here the relationship is shown by the genitive ending -in^{4} added to the first noun; the second noun has the third-person suffix of possession -(s)i^{4}.
- indefinite (qualifying) compound (belirtisiz tamlama). E.g. Türkiye Cumhuriyeti "Turkey-Republic (Note: Lewis points out that "an indefinite izafet group can be turned into intelligible (though not necessarily normal) English by the use of a hyphen".) = the Republic of Turkey": not the republic belonging to Turkey, but the Republic that is Turkey. Here the first noun has no ending; but the second noun has the ending (s)i^{4}—the same as in definite compounds.

The following table illustrates these principles. In some cases, the constituents of the compounds are themselves compounds; for clarity these subsidiary compounds are marked with [square brackets]. The suffixes involved in the linking are underlined. If the second noun group already had a possessive suffix (because it is a compound by itself), no further suffix is added.

Linked nouns and noun groups
Definite (possessive)	Indefinite (qualifier)	Complement	Meaning
kimsenin		yanıtı	nobody's answer
	"kimse"	yanıtı	the answer "nobody"
Atatürk'ün		evi	Atatürk's house
	Atatürk	Bulvarı	Atatürk Boulevard (named after, not belonging to Atatürk)
Orhan'ın		adı	Orhan's name
	"Orhan"	adı	the name "Orhan"
	r	sessizi	the consonant r
[r sessizi]nin		söylenişi	pronunciation of the consonant r
	Türk	[Dil Kurumu]	Turkish Language-Association
	[Türk Dili]	Dergisi	Turkish-Language Magazine
	Ford	[aile arabası]	Ford family car
Ford'un		[aile arabası]	(Mr) Ford's family car
[Ford ailesi]nin		arabası	the Ford family's car (Note: For other possible permutations of this vehicle, see Lewis (2001):46.)
	Ankara	[Kız Lisesi] (Note: "It is most important to note that the third-person suffix is not repeated though theoretically one might have expected Ankara [Kız Lisesi]si.)	Ankara Girls' School
	[yıl sonu]	sınavları	year-end examinations
Bulgaristan'ın		[İstanbul Başkonsolosluğu]	the Istanbul Consulate-General of Bulgaria (located in Istanbul, but belonging to Bulgaria)
	[ [İstanbul Üniversitesi] [Edebiyat Fakültesi] ]	[ [Türk Edebiyatı] Profesörü]	Professor of Turkish Literature in the Faculty of Literature of the University of Istanbul
	ne oldum	delisi	"what-have-I-become!" (Note: Note the similarity with the French phrase un m'as-tu-vu "a have-you-seen-me?", i.e., a vain and pretentious person.) madman = parvenu who gives himself airs

As the last example shows, the qualifying expression may be a substantival sentence rather than a noun or noun group. (Note: The term substantival sentence is Lewis's.)

There is a third way of linking the nouns where both nouns take no suffixes (takısız tamlama). However, in this case the first noun acts as an adjective, e.g. Demir kapı (iron gate), elma yanak ("apple cheek", i.e. red cheek), kömür göz ("coal eye", i.e. black eye) :

=== Adjectives ===
Adjectives are hard to distinguish from nouns, with a great majority of them being able to take the same morphology that nouns do. For example, büyük ("big, old") can become büyüklerim ("my elders"). The only large class of exceptions to this are those formed with the suffixes -si, -(i)msi, -(i)mtrak, the Arabic-derived nisba suffix -î, the Persian-derived Persian -ane and -varî, and certain more recent borrowings such as demokratik ("democratic") and kültürel ("cultural").

Adjectives always precede their nouns, with two exceptions:

- The words kare ("square") and küp ("cube") follow unit names such as in bir metre küp or bir metreküp ("one cubic meter")
- merhum ("the late") may come after the name of the deceased, mirroring Arabic usage.

Comparison of adjectives is achieved through putting the noun being compared against in the ablative case: ağır ("heavy"), kurşundan ağır ("heavier than lead"). Less … than is translated by putting az ("little") between the noun and adjective: kurşundan az ağır. daha ("more") may be inserted for emphasis: kurşundan daha ağır, kurşundan daha az ağır. However, daha is necessary when there is no noun being compared against: bu çekiç daha ucuz, öteki daha sağlam ("this hammer is cheaper, that one is stronger").

The superlative is expressed through the adverb en ("most"): en az verimli toprak ("the least fertile soil").

Certain adjectives can form reduplicated intensive forms, where the first syllable is prefixed to the word, with the letters ⟨m, p, n, s⟩ replacing its coda if it exists. The prefix also takes the word's accent.

- açık ("open") → apaçık ("explicit, obvious, absolutely clear")
- başka ("different") → bambaşka ("totally different")
- kara ("black") → kapkara ("pitch black")

==== var and yok ====
Existence and absence are expressed through the adjectives var ("existent") and yok ("non-existent"), equivalent to English there is/are and there is/are not.

- Köşede bir kahve var. ("There is a cafe on the corner.")
- Bu köyde postane var mı? ("Is there a post office in this village?")

Questions such as the one above are answered simply as var or yok.

Possession is also expressed through these words, with the subject of English have put in the genitive:

- Mehmet'in parası var. ("Mehmet has money.") (Note: Lewis notes that an English grammatical direct translation of "Mehmet's money exists" is wrong, preferring instead the parsing "His money exists-Mehmet's" He attributes this view to Mundy, who points out that in the sentence Mehmet'in o bankada parası var ("Mehmet has money in that bank"), the argument of o bankada is parası var, instead of simply parası, as it would be in an ordinary izafet compound.)

=== Verbs ===
==== Copula ====
The copula *imek, (Note: In modern Turkish, the copula is a defective verb that derives from Proto-Turkic ermek (of no relation to modern Turkish ermek ("to reach")) that has simplified into the form *imek. Despite being used by some grammarians, this form has never actually existed.) equivalent to English to be, is typically omitted in informal speech in sentences of the form "A = B" (where A is in the third person), though it is used for this purpose in formal speech or writing. In informal speech, the copula is instead used to mark supposition, emphasis, surety, or confidence.

Copula conjugation
Number	Person	Ending
Singular	1st	-im
Singular	2nd	-sin
Singular	3rd	(-dir/tir)
Plural	1st	-iz
Plural	2nd	-siniz
Plural	3rd	(-dir/tir)ler

Copula in informal speech
Turkish	English
Belge kasada.	The document is in the safe.
Belge kasadadır.	The document is surely in the safe, must be in the safe. (less common, confidence) The document is in the safe.

Other uses for the copula in informal speech include when

- the predicate is a relative clause
- the subject is a pronoun understood from the context
- the subject is a noun which follows the predicate,
- the subject is a phrase containing a postposition, and the predicate is introduced by ki ("that").

Bundan dolayıdır ki gitmedim. ("It is because of this that I did not go.")

Only in this last situation is the copula strictly necessary.

The copula is negated by suffixing it to the end of the adverb değil ("not").

==== Other verbs ====
Turkish verbs indicate person. They can be made negative, potential ("can"), or non-potential ("cannot"). Furthermore, Turkish verbs show tense (present, past, future, and aorist), mood (conditional, imperative, inferential, necessitative, and optative), and aspect. The inferential suffix -miş^{4} is also glossed as a direct evidential or a mirative. Negation is expressed by the suffix -me²- immediately following the stem.

Turkish	English
gel-	(to) come
gelebil-	(to) be able to come
gelme-	not (to) come
geleme-	(to) be unable to come
gelememiş	Apparently (s)he couldn't come
gelebilecek	(s)he'll be able to come
gelmeyebilir	(s)he may (possibly) not come
gelemeyebilir	(s)he may (possibly) unable to come
gelebilirsen	if you can come
gelinir	(passive) one comes, people come
gelebilmeliydin	you should have been able to come
gelebilseydin	if you could have come
gelmeliydin	you should have come

=== Verb tenses ===
(For the sake of simplicity the term "tense" is used here throughout, although for some forms "aspect" or "mood" might be more appropriate.) There are nine simple and 20 compound tenses in Turkish. The nine simple tenses are: simple past (di'li geçmiş), inferential past (miş'li geçmiş), present continuous, simple present (aorist), future, optative, subjunctive, necessitative ("must") and imperative. There are three groups of compound forms. "Story" (hikaye) is the witnessed past of the above forms (except command), referral (rivayet) is the unwitnessed past of the above forms (except simple past and command), conditional (koşul) is the conditional form of the first five basic tenses. In the example below, the second person singular of the verb gitmek ("go"), stem gid-/git-, is shown.

English of the basic form	Basic tense	Story (hikâye/remember)	Referral (rivayet/notice)	Condition (koşul/if)
you went	gittin	gittiydin	–	gittiysen
you have gone	gitmişsin	gitmiştin	gitmişmişsin	gitmişsen
you are going	gidiyorsun	gidiyordun	gidiyormuşsun	gidiyorsan
you (get to) go	gidersin	giderdin	gidermişsin	gidersen
you will go	gideceksin	gidecektin	gidecekmişsin	gideceksen
if only you go	gitsen	gitseydin	gitseymişsin	–
may you go	gidesin	gideydin	gideymişsin	–
you must go	gitmelisin	gitmeliydin	gitmeliymişsin	–
go! (imperative)	git	–	–	–

There are also so-called combined verbs, which are created by suffixing certain verb stems (like bil or ver) to the original stem of a verb. Bil is the suffix for the sufficiency mood. It is the equivalent of the English auxiliary verbs "able to", "can" or "may". Ver is the suffix for the swiftness mood, kal for the perpetuity mood and yaz for the approach ("almost") mood. Thus, while gittin means "you went", gidebildin means "you could go" and gidiverdin means "you went swiftly". The tenses of the combined verbs are formed the same way as for simple verbs.

==== Attributive verbs (participles) ====
Turkish verbs have attributive forms, including present, (Note: The conventional translation of the film title Dünyayı Kurtaran Adam, The Man Who Saved the World, uses the past tense. Semantically, his saving the world takes place though in the (narrative) present.) similar to the English present participle (with the ending -en^{2}); future (-ecek^{2}); indirect/inferential past (-miş^{4}); and aorist (-er^{2} or -ir^{4}).

The most important function of some of these attributive verbs is to form modifying phrases equivalent to the relative clauses found in most European languages. The subject of the verb in an -en^{2} form is (possibly implicitly) in the third person (he/she/it/they); this form, when used in a modifying phrase, does not change according to number. The other attributive forms used in these constructions are the future (-ecek^{2}) and an older form (-dik^{4}), which covers both present and past meanings. (Note: See Lewis (2001):163–165, 260–262 for an exhaustive treatment.) These two forms take "personal endings," which have the same form as the possessive suffixes but indicate the person and possibly number of the subject of the attributive verb; for example, yediğim means "what I eat," yediğin means "what you eat," and so on. The use of these "personal or relative participles" is illustrated in the following table, in which the examples are presented according to the grammatical case which would be seen in the equivalent English relative clause. (Note: For the terms personal and relative participle see Lewis (1958):98 and Lewis (2001):163 respectively. Most of the examples are taken from Lewis (2001).)

English equivalent		Example
Case of relative pronoun	Pronoun	Example
Nominative	who, which/that	şimdi konuşan adam now speaking man the man (who is) now speaking
Genitive	whose (nom.)	babası şimdi konuşan adam father-is now speaking man the man whose father is now speaking
	whose (acc.)	babasını dün gördüğüm adam father-is-ACC yesterday seen-my man the man whose father I saw yesterday
	at whose	resimlerine baktığımız ressam pictures-is-to looked-our artist the artist whose pictures we looked at
	of which	muhtarı seçildiği köy mayor-its been-chosen-his village the village of which he was elected mayor
	of which	muhtarı seçilmek istediği köy the village of which he wishes to be elected mayor
Remaining cases (incl. prepositions)	whom, which	yazdığım mektup written-my letter the letter (which) I wrote
	from which	çıktığımız kapı emerged-our door the door from which we emerged
	on which	geldikleri vapur come-their ship the ship they came on
	which + subordinate clause	yaklaştığını anladığı hapishane günleri approach-their-ACC understood-his prison days-its the prison days (which) he knew were approaching (Note: This more complex example from Orhan Pamuk's Kar (Snow) contains a nested structure: [which he knew [were approaching]]. Maureen Freely's more succinct and idiomatic translation is the days in prison he knew lay ahead. Pamuk uses the spelling hapisane.) (Note: From the perspective of Turkish grammar yaklaştığını anladığı is exactly parallel to babasını gördüğüm ("whose father I saw"), and could therefore be paraphrased as "whose approaching he understood".)

== Vocabulary ==
The latest 2011 edition of Güncel Türkçe Sözlük (Current Turkish Dictionary), the official dictionary of the Turkish language published by Turkish Language Association, contains 117,000 words organized into 93,000 entries.

=== Word origins ===
Origins of the Turkish vocabulary
1. Turkic languages (86.6%)
2. Arabic (5.81%)
3. French (4.73%)
4. Persian (1.22%)
5. Italian (0.57%)
6. English (0.43%)
7. Greek (0.36%)
8. Latin (0.13%)
9. Other (0.16%)

Around 86% of the Turkish vocabulary is of Turkic origin. The majority of the core vocabulary and the most commonly used words in Turkish, including those first acquired by children as they learn to speak, derive from Turkic. Nevertheless, Turkish vocabulary contains a significant number of loanwords from other languages, in which around 14% of Turkish words are of foreign origin. According to the Turkish Language Association, 6,463 of these foreign words come from Arabic, 4,974 from French, 1,374 from Persian, 632 from Italian, 538 from English, 399 from Greek, and 147 from Latin.

In Turkish, there are many pairs of synonyms where one word is of foreign origin and the other of Turkic origin. These pairs are the result of the enrichment of the Turkish vocabulary with loanwords from Arabic, Persian and French, and of the Turkish language reform initiated in the early 20th century that aimed to restore foreign-origin words with Turkic equivalents.

=== Word formation ===
Turkish extensively uses agglutination to form new words from nouns and verbal stems. The majority of Turkish words originate from the application of derivative suffixes to a relatively small set of core vocabulary.

Turkish obeys certain principles when it comes to suffixation. Most suffixes in Turkish will have more than one form, depending on the vowels and consonants in the root- vowel harmony rules will apply; consonant-initial suffixes will follow the voiced/ voiceless character of the consonant in the final unit of the root; and in the case of vowel-initial suffixes an additional consonant may be inserted if the root ends in a vowel, or the suffix may lose its initial vowel. There is also a prescribed order of affixation of suffixes- as a rule of thumb, derivative suffixes precede inflectional suffixes which are followed by clitics, as can be seen in the example set of words derived from a substantive root below:

Turkish	Components	English	Word class
göz	göz	eye	Noun
gözlük	göz + -lük	eyeglasses	Noun
gözlükçü	göz + -lük + -çü	optician	Noun
gözlükçülük	göz + -lük + -çü + -lük	optician's trade	Noun
gözlem	göz + -lem / göz + -le-y-iş	observation	Noun
gözlemci	göz + -lem + -ci	observer	Noun
gözle-	göz + -le	observe	Verb (order)
gözlemek	göz + -le + -mek	to observe	Verb (infinitive)
gözetlemek	göz + -et + -le + -mek	to peep	Verb (infinitive)

Another example, starting from a verbal root:

Turkish	Components	English	Word class
yat-	yat-	lie down	Verb (order)
yatmak	yat-mak	to lie down	Verb (infinitive)
yatık	yat- + -(ı)k	leaning	Adjective
yatak	yat- + -ak	bed, place to sleep	Noun
yatay	yat- + -ay	horizontal	Adjective
yatkın	yat- + -gın	inclined to; stale (from lying too long)	Adjective
yatır-	yat- + -(ı)r-	lay down	Verb (order)
yatırmak	yat- + -(ı)r-mak	to lay down something/someone	Verb (infinitive)
yatırım	yat- + -(ı)r- + -(ı)m	laying down; deposit, investment	Noun
yatırımcı	yat- + -(ı)r- + -(ı)m + -cı	depositor, investor	Noun

New words are also frequently formed by compounding two existing words into a new one, as in German. Compounds can be of two types- bare and (s)I. The bare compounds, both nouns and adjectives are effectively two words juxtaposed without the addition of suffixes for example the word for girlfriend kızarkadaş (kız+arkadaş) or black pepper karabiber (kara+biber). A few examples of compound words are given below:

Turkish	English	Constituent words	Literal meaning
pazartesi	Monday	pazar ("Sunday") and ertesi ("after")	after Sunday
bilgisayar	computer	bilgi ("information") and say- ("to count")	information counter
gökdelen	skyscraper	gök ("sky") and del- ("to pierce")	sky piercer
başparmak	thumb	baş ("prime") and parmak ("finger")	primary finger
önyargı	prejudice	ön ("before") and yargı ("splitting; judgement")	fore-judging

However, the majority of compound words in Turkish are (s)I compounds, which means that the second word will be marked by the 3rd person possessive suffix. A few such examples are given in the table below (note vowel harmony):

Turkish	English	Constituent words	Possessive Suffix
el çantası	handbag	el (hand) and çanta (bag)	+sı
masa örtüsü	tablecloth	masa (table) and örtü (cover)	+sü
çay bardağı	tea glass	çay (tea) and bardak (glass)	+ı (the k changes to ğ)

=== Idiomatic language ===
Turkish has a wide variety of idioms derived from body parts. Unlike Western metaphors that connect the heart with love, Turkish speakers more often conceptualize the heart (yürek (the more commonly used one of the two in idioms) or kalp) as a container, bearer, or experiencer of negative emotions such as sadness, pity, distress, or fear. The eye is similarly used in a great number of idioms. Common metaphors for the eye include using it to represent a compartment or division of a physical object, a hole or gap, an object of love, a person or experiencer, perception, hunger, or a mental state.

== Writing system ==
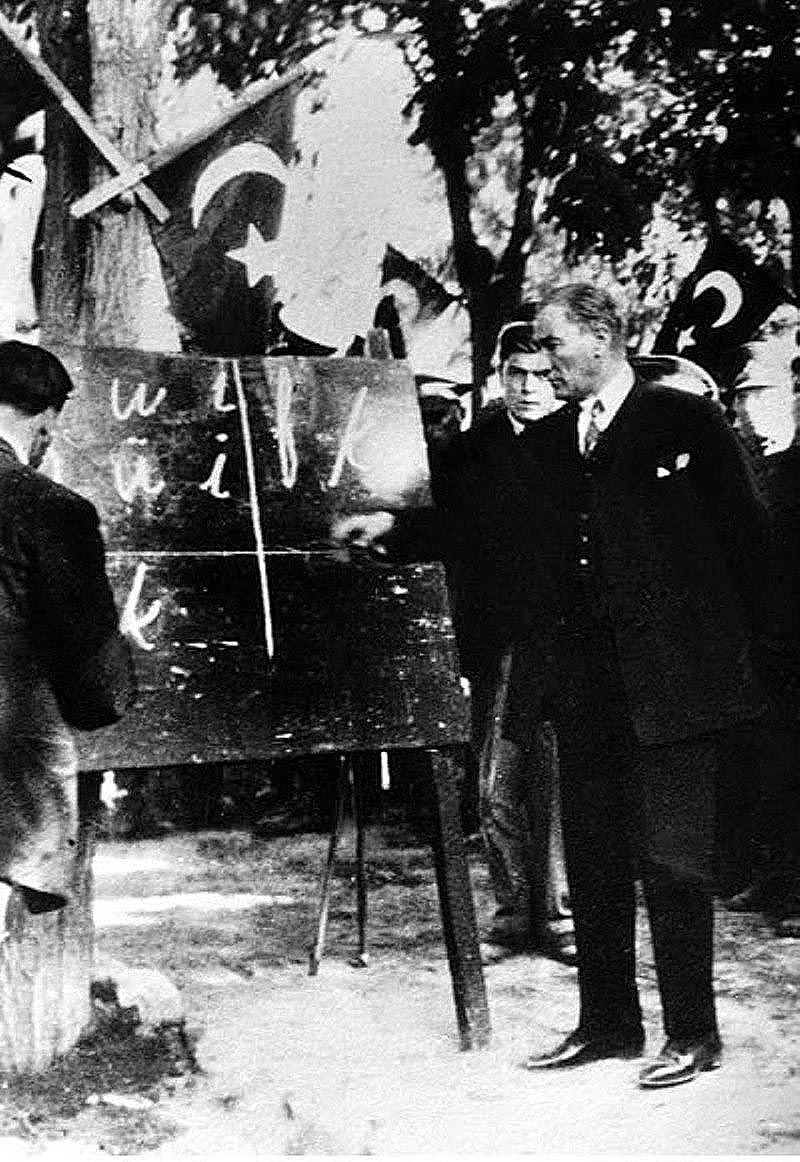
Atatürk introducing the new Turkish alphabet to the people of Kayseri. September 20, 1928. (Cover of the French L'Illustration magazine)

Turkish is written using a version of Latin script introduced in 1928 by Atatürk to replace the Ottoman Turkish alphabet, a version of Perso-Arabic script. The Ottoman alphabet marked only three different vowels—long ā, ū and ī—and included several redundant consonants, such as variants of z (which were distinguished in Arabic but not in Turkish). The omission of short vowels in the Arabic script was claimed to make it particularly unsuitable for Turkish, which has eight vowels.

The reform of the script was an important step in the cultural reforms of the period. The task of preparing the new alphabet and selecting the necessary modifications for sounds specific to Turkish was entrusted to a Language Commission composed of prominent linguists, academics, and writers. The introduction of the new Turkish alphabet was supported by public education centers opened throughout the country, cooperation with publishing companies, and encouragement by Atatürk himself, who toured the country teaching the new letters to the public. As a result, there was a dramatic increase in literacy from its original, pre-modern levels.

The Latin alphabet was applied to the Turkish language for educational purposes even before the 20th-century reform. Instances include a 1635 Latin-Albanian dictionary by Frang Bardhi, who also incorporated several sayings in the Turkish language, as an appendix to his work (e.g. alma agatsdan irak duschamas (Note: In modern Turkish spelling: elma ağaçtan ırak düşmez.)—"An apple does not fall far from its tree").

Turkish now has an alphabet suited to the sounds of the language: the spelling is largely phonemic, with one letter corresponding to each phoneme. Most of the letters are used approximately as in English, the main exceptions being ⟨c⟩, which denotes [dʒ] (⟨j⟩ being used for the [ʒ] found in Persian and European loans); and the undotted ⟨ı⟩, representing [ɯ]. As in German, ⟨ö⟩ and ⟨ü⟩ represent [ø] and [y]. The letter ⟨ğ⟩, in principle, denotes [ɣ] but has the property of lengthening the preceding vowel and assimilating any subsequent vowel. The letters ⟨ş⟩ and ⟨ç⟩ represent [ʃ] and [tʃ], respectively. A circumflex is written over back vowels following ⟨k⟩ and ⟨g⟩ when these consonants represent [c] and [ɟ]—almost exclusively in Arabic and Persian loans. (Note: In these cases the circumflex conveys information about the preceding consonant rather than the vowel over which it is written.)

The Turkish alphabet consists of 29 letters (q, w, x omitted and ç, ş, ğ, ı, ö, ü added); the complete list is:

a, b, c, ç, d, e, f, g, ğ, h, ı, i, j, k, l, m, n, o, ö, p, r, s, ş, t, u, ü, v, y, and z (Capital of i is İ and lowercase I is ı.)

The specifically Turkish letters and spellings described above are illustrated in this table:

Turkish spelling	Pronunciation	Meaning
Cağaloğlu	ˈdʒaːɫoːɫu	[İstanbul district]
çalıştığı	tʃaɫɯʃtɯː	where/that (s)he works/worked
müjde	myʒˈde	good news
lazım	laːˈzɯm	necessary
mahkûm	mahˈcum	prisoner

== Sample texts ==
=== Dostlar Beni Hatırlasın ===
Dostlar Beni Hatırlasın is a Turkish folk poem by the world-renowned poet and ashik Âşık Veysel Şatıroğlu (1894–1973).

Turkish orthography	IPA transcription	English translation
Ben giderim adım kalır	[bɛɲ ɟid̪e̞ɾim äd̪ɯm käɫɯɾ]	I depart, my name remains
Dostlar beni hatırlasın	[d̪o̞st̪ɫäɾ be̞ni hätɯɾɫäsɯn]	May friends remember me
Düğün olur bayram gelir	[d̪yjyn o̞ɫuɾ bäjɾäm ɟe̞liɾ]	There are weddings, there are feasts
Dostlar beni hatırlasın	[d̪o̞st̪ɫäɾ be̞ni hätɯɾɫäsɯn]	May friends remember me
Can kafeste durmaz uçar	[d͡ʒäŋ käfe̞st̪e̞ d̪uɾmäz ut͡ʃäɾ]	The soul won't stay caged, it flies away
Dünya bir han konan göçer	[d̪ynjä biɾ häŋ ko̞näɲ ɟø̞t͡ʃɛɾ]	The world is an inn, residents depart
Ay dolanır yıllar geçer	[äj d̪o̞ɫänɯɾ jɯɫːäɾ ɟe̞t͡ʃɛɾ]	The moon wanders, years pass by
Dostlar beni hatırlasın	[d̪o̞st̪ɫäɾ be̞ni hätɯɾɫäsɯn]	May friends remember me
Can bedenden ayrılacak	[d͡ʒän be̞d̪ɛnd̪ɛn äjɾɯɫäd͡ʒäk]	The soul will leave the body
Tütmez baca yanmaz ocak	[t̪yt̪mɛz bäd͡ʒä jänmäz o̞d͡ʒäk]	The chimney won't smoke, furnace won't burn
Selam olsun kucak kucak	[se̞läːm o̞ɫsuŋ kud͡ʒäk kud͡ʒäk]	Goodbye goodbye to you all
Dostlar beni hatırlasın	[d̪o̞st̪ɫäɾ be̞ni hätɯɾɫäsɯn]	May friends remember me
Açar solar türlü çiçek	[ät͡ʃäɾ so̞läɾ t̪yɾly t͡ʃit͡ʃe̞k]	Various flowers bloom and fade
Kimler gülmüş kim gülecek	[kimlɛɾ ɟylmyʃ kim ɟyle̞d͡ʒe̞k]	Someone laughed, someone will laugh
Murat yalan ölüm gerçek	[muɾät jäɫän ø̞lym gɛɾt͡ʃe̞k]	Wishes are lies, death is real
Dostlar beni hatırlasın	[d̪o̞st̪ɫäɾ be̞ni hätɯɾɫäsɯn]	May friends remember me
Gün ikindi akşam olur	[ɟyn ikindi äkʃäm o̞ɫuɾ]	Morning and afternoon turn to night
Gör ki başa neler gelir	[ɟø̞ɾ ki bäʃä ne̞lɛɾ ɟe̞liɾ]	And many things happen to a person anyway
Veysel gider adı kalır	[ve̞jsɛl ɟidɛɾ äd̪ɯ käɫɯɾ]	Veysel departs, his name remains
Dostlar beni hatırlasın	[d̪o̞st̪ɫäɾ be̞ni hätɯɾɫäsɯn]	May friends remember me

=== İnsan Hakları Evrensel Bildirisi ===
Turkish pronunciation

Article 1 of the Universal Declaration of Human Rights in Turkish:

Bütün insanlar hür, haysiyet ve haklar bakımından eşit doğarlar. Akıl ve vicdana sahiptirler ve birbirlerine karşı kardeşlik zihniyeti ile hareket etmelidirler.

Article 1 of the Universal Declaration of Human Rights in English:

All human beings are born free and equal in dignity and rights. They are endowed with reason and conscience and should act towards one another in a spirit of brotherhood.

International Phonetic Alphabet transcription:

[byˈt̪ʰyn̪ in̪s̪än̪ˈɫ̪äɾ̞̊ hyɾ̞̊ häjs̪iˈje̞t̪ ve̞ häk̠ˈɫ̪äɾ‿bäk̠ʰɯmɯn̪ˈd̪än̪ e̞ˈʃit̪ d̪o̞.äɾˈɫ̪äɾ̞̊ ‖ äˈk̠ʰɯɫ̪ ve̞ vid͡ʒd̪äˈn̪ä sä(h)ipt̪ʰiɾˈl̠ɛɾ̞̊ ve̞ biɾbiɾl̠e̞ɾiˈn̪e̞ k̠ʰäɾˈʃɯ k̠ʰäɾd̪e̞ʃˈl̠ik̟ z̪ihn̪ije̞ˈt̪ʰi‿iˈl̠e̞ häɾe̞ˈk̟ʰe̞t̪ e̞t̪me̞l̠id̪iɾˈl̠ɛɾ̞̊ ‖]

== Turkish computer keyboard ==
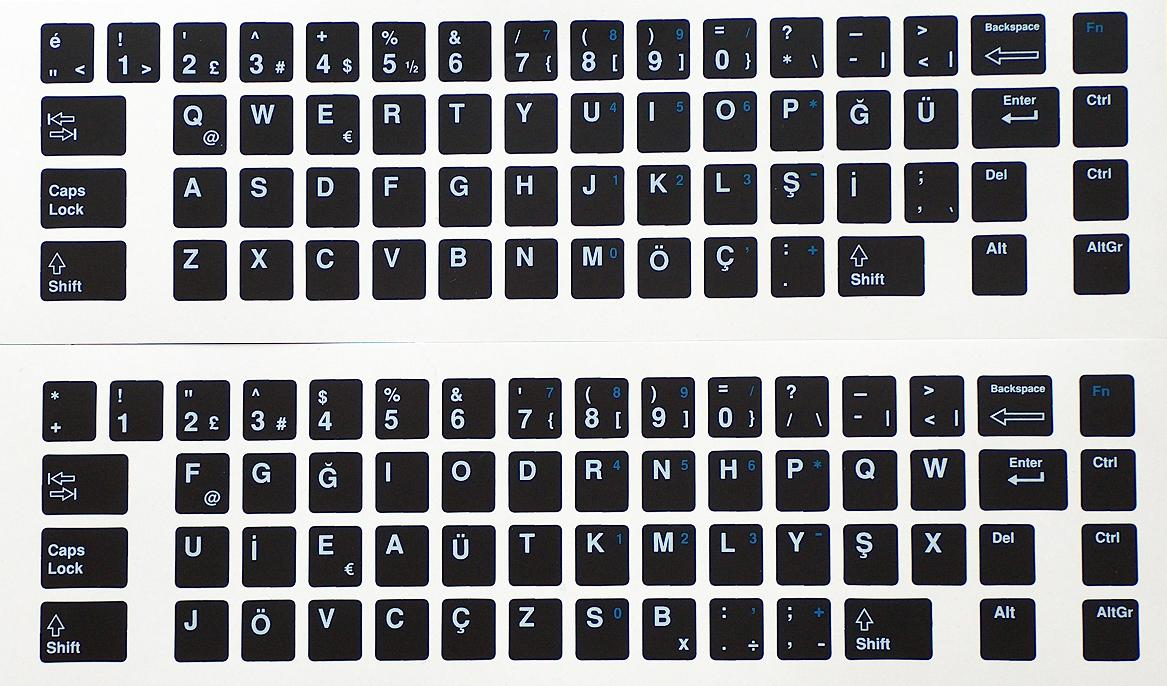

Turkish language uses two standardised keyboard layouts, known as Turkish Q (QWERTY) and Turkish F, with Turkish Q being the most common.

== See also ==
- Sun Language Theory
- Turkish name
- Turkish Sign Language
- List of English words of Turkic origin
- Languages used on the Internet
- Turkish bird language
- Öztürkçe
