= Abusive language =

Abusive language may refer to:

- Verbal abuse, a type of psychological or mental abuse that involves the use of oral or written language directed to a victim
- Insult, an expression, statement, or behavior that is disrespectful or derogatory towards an individual or a group
- Profanity, the usage of notionally offensive words for a variety of purposes
- Abusive language (law), the legality of the use of abusive language to another person
- Fighting words, spoken words intended to provoke violence
- Verdict – Formal finding of fact made by a jury on matters submitted to it by the judge

== See also ==
- Abuse of language
- Defamation (disambiguation)
- Loaded language – Rhetoric used to influence an audience
- Slander (disambiguation)
- Verbal aggression – Personality trait or a mainly destructive form of communication
