= Defamation (disambiguation) =

Defamation is a communication that injures a third party's reputation and causes a legally redressable injury.

Defamation may also refer to:

- Defamation (Dutch criminal law)
- Defamation Act, stock short title used for legislation in various countries relating to defamation
- Defamation (film), 2009 Israeli documentary film
- Defamation Act 2013, an act of the Parliament of the United Kingdom which changed English defamation law
- Unintentional defamation, where a work of fiction contains a character that coincidentally shares a name or other recognizable characteristics with a real person

== See also ==
- Defamer (disambiguation)
- Anti-Defamation League (disambiguation)
- Defamation of religion and the United Nations
- United States defamation law
- English defamation law
- Defamation in Australia
- Canadian defamation law
- Anti-Defamation League, New York-based international advocacy organization with the purpose of combatting antisemitism
- Anti-Defamation Commission, a Jewish-Australian community to combat antisemitism in Australia
- Punjab Defamation Act 2024, piece of legislation passed by the Punjab Assembly in Pakistan
- Polish League Against Defamation, right-wing nationalist non-governmental organization based in Warsaw, Poland
