= Verbal abuse (disambiguation) =

Verbal abuse is a form of abusive behavior involving the use of language.

Verbal abuse may also refer to:

- Verbal Abuse (band), an American hardcore punk band
- "Verbal Abuse", a song by the Undead

== See also ==
- Abusive language (disambiguation)
- Verbal aggression, a form of verbal abuse
- Verbosity, speech or writing that uses more words than necessary
