= Turkish grammar =

Grammar of the Turkish language

Turkish, similarly to other Turkic languages, is a highly agglutinative language, in that much of the grammar is expressed by means of suffixes added to nouns and verbs. It is also very regular, comprising few (and usually predictable) exceptions. For example, evlerden "from the houses" can be analysed as ev "house", -ler (plural suffix), -den (ablative case, meaning "from"); gidiyorum "I am going" as git "go", -iyor (present continuous tense), -um (1st person singular = "I").

It is also a very strongly left-branching language : modifiers always come before what they modify, exclusive use of postpositions, finite verbs always being at the end of a clause. There are two main classes of inflectable words, nouns and verbs, a given root being generally either verbal or nominal but not both.

Another characteristic of Turkish is vowel harmony. Most suffixes have two (front/back distinction) or four (front/back + rounded/unrounded distinction) different forms, the choice between which depends on the vowel of the word's root or the preceding suffix: for example, the ablative case of evler is evlerden "from the houses" but, the ablative case of başlar "heads" is başlardan "from the heads".

Verbs have six grammatical persons (three singular and three plural), various voices (active and passive, reflexive, reciprocal, and causative), and a large number of grammatical tenses. Meanings such as "not", "be able", "should" and "if", which are expressed as separate words in most European languages, are usually expressed with verbal suffixes in Turkish. A characteristic of Turkish which is shared by neighboring languages such as Bulgarian and Persian is that the perfect tense suffix (in Turkish -miş-, -müş-, -mış-, or -muş-) often has an inferential meaning, e.g. geliyormuşum "it would seem (they say) that I am coming".

Verbs also have a number of participial forms, which Turkish makes much use of. Clauses which begin with "who" or "because" in English are generally translated by means of participial phrases in Turkish. These forms are often nominal forms derived from the verb. For example, olmadığında "when (s)he is not here, when there's no(t)", decomposes as ol- "be, become", -ma "negative", -dık (dığ before a vowel) "realis nominal suffix", -ı(n) "3rd person possessive suffix" and finally -da "locative/stative suffix", "in, at". This form could also be translated as a nominal phrase, "in his/her/its absence". Such nominals also work as head-modifiers. Example: Küçük kedi, dün getirdiğim sütü içti. "The little cat drank the milk I brought yesterday.", where getirdiğim "(that) I brought" analyzes as getir- "bring", -dik same suffix as in olmadığında and -im "1st person sg possessive suffix". This is also a nominal derived from a verb, yet it determines sütü "the milk", definite accusative form of süt.

== Morphology ==
Turkish words are routinely formed through the attachment to a stem (gövde) of one or more suffixes (ekler). A stem may be a root (kök) or further analyzable into parts. Turkish suffixes fall roughly into two classes: constructive suffixes (yapım ekleri) and inflectional suffixes (çekim ekleri). A constructive suffix makes a new word from an old one, that is, it is a derivational suffix. An inflectional suffix indicates how a word is used in a sentence.

The vowels of suffixes undergo vowel harmony. When a suffix is attached to a stem, the vowel in the suffix generally agrees in frontness or backness and in roundedness with the last vowel in the stem or of the preceding suffix.

Some suffixes show two-way vowel harmony between e and a, for example the plural suffix -ler/-lar. The e form is found after a syllable with i, e, ö or ü (e.g. evler "houses", günler "days"), and also after certain Arabic or French borrowings such as saatler "hours, clocks", kalpler "hearts". Other suffixes show four-way vowel harmony between i, ı, u, ü, for example the possessive ending -im/-ım/-um/-üm "my". These endings are found after syllables containing their own vowels or after e, a, o, ö respectively (e.g. evim "my house", gözüm "my eye", etc.)

No vowel harmony involves o and ö. Vowel harmony only affects two consecutive vowels: the very common continuous verbal suffix -iyor has only its first vowel changing: -iyor, -üyor, -ıyor, -uyor, the vowels following being always back (rounded) vowels, -iyor-um, -iyor-lar, never *-iyör-üm, -iyör-ler.

A Turkish suffix can be called enclitic if its vowel undergoes vowel harmony, agreeing with the last vowel of the stem the suffix is attached to.

=== Gender ===
Turkish lacks grammatical gender. The English third-person singular pronouns she, he, and it all correspond to a single Turkish pronoun, o. Many given names in Turkish are unisex, so it is entirely possible to describe someone in the Turkish language without their gender being discernible from grammatical context.

=== Person ===
Turkish has a strong T–V distinction, using the second-person plural as the formal form, as in French and many other languages.

Turkish also uses various honorifics.

==== T–V distinction ====
Family members and friends speak to one another using the second singular person sen, and adults use sen to address minors. In formal situations (meeting people for the first time, business, customer-clerk, colleagues) plural second-person siz is used almost exclusively. In very formal situations, double plural second-person sizler may refer to a much-respected person. Rarely, third-person plural conjugation of the verb (but not the pronoun) may be used to emphasize utmost respect. In the imperative, there are three forms: second person singular for informal, second person plural for formal, and double plural second person for very formal situations. Thus, the imperative forms of the verb gelmek, "to come", are gel (second person singular, informal), gelin (second person plural, formal), and geliniz (double second-person plural, very formal). The very formal forms are not frequently used.

==== Honorifics ====
Turkish honorifics generally follow the first name, especially if they refer to gender or particular social statuses (e.g. <name> Bey (Mr.), <name> Hanım (Ms.), <name> Öğretmen (teacher)). Such honorifics are used both in formal and informal situations. A newer honorific is Sayın, which precedes the surname or full name, and is not gender-specific. (e.g. Sayın Name Surname, or Sayın Surname, or Sayın Name Bey/Hanım). They are generally used in very formal situations. While these honorifics are normally used in pre-position to Turkish first names, for foreigners, names are preceded by Bay (Mr.) or Bayan (Ms.): Bay [Fox] Mulder, Bayan [Dana] Scully (cf. Fox [Mulder] Bey, Dana [Scully] Hanım, if these names were Turkish).

=== Turkish terminology ===
In the Turkish terms for the constructive and inflectional endings, three roots are involved:

- ek "supplement, affix" (notably Turkish has no prefixes)
- yap- "make"
- çek- "pull, draw"

For the last two verbal roots, the constructive suffix -im can be added to form nouns for instances of the actions denoted by the roots:

- yapım "construction"; "derivation".
- çekim "[a] pull or draw" (or a "take" in cinema).

Either of these nouns can be compounded with the noun ek, resulting in an indefinite compound (belirtisiz tamlama), the sign of which is the inflectional suffix -i attached to ek:

- yapım eki "structure-suffix"; "derivational suffix".
- çekim eki "inflection-suffix".

The inflectional suffix -ler comes before the -i to form the plural, so yapım ekleri, çekim ekleri.

Many words in Turkish— particularly many grammatical terms— are neologisms invented to replace earlier words borrowed from Arabic or Persian, which have largely been successful at permanently superseding the previously used foreign terms. (See the main article on Turkish language.) In some cases, the foreign term continues to be in use alongside the neologism.

== Parts of speech ==
There are nine parts of speech (söz türleri "word-kinds") in Turkish.

1. noun (isim or ad "name");
2. pronoun (zamir "inner being", or adıl from ad);
3. adjective (sıfat "role, quality", or önad "front-noun");
4. verb (fiil "act, deed", or eylem "action" from eyle- "make, do");
5. adverb (zarf "envelope", or belirteç from belir- "determine");
6. postposition (ilgeç from ilgi "interest, relation");
7. conjunction (bağlaç from bağ "bond");
8. particle (edat, or ilgeç);
9. interjection (nidâ [dated], or ünlem from ün "fame, repute, sound").

Postpositions are analogous to prepositions in English, the main difference being that they follow their objects. Postpositions can be considered particles, but there are particles in Turkish that are not postpositions.

Only nouns, pronouns and verbs are inflected in Turkish. An adjective can usually be treated as a noun or pronoun, in which case it can also be inflected. Inflection can give a noun features of a verb such as person and tense. With inflection, a verb can become one of the following:

- verbal noun (isim-fiil);
- verbal adjective (sıfat-fiil) or participle (ortaç);
- verbal adverb (zarf-fiil) or gerund (ulaç).

These have peculiarities not shared with other nouns, adjectives or adverbs. For example, some participles take a person the way verbs do. Also, a verbal noun or adverb can take a direct object. Some verbal nouns are not inflected forms in Turkish but are borrowed from Arabic or other languages.

In Turkish, an ascriptive clause can be composed of a common noun standing alone as the Predicative, both the Subject and the Predicator being implicit and assumed from the situation. Example:

köpek – "dog"
Köpek. – "It is a dog."

This means that both a noun and a verb can alone constitute an affirmative clause in Turkish, which is not the case in English.

There are two standards for listing verbs in dictionaries. Most dictionaries follow the tradition of spelling out the infinitive form (mastar hali) of the verb as the headword of the entry, but others such as the Redhouse Turkish-English Dictionary are more technical and spell out the stem of the verb instead, that is, they spell out a string of letters that is useful for producing all other verb forms through morphological rules. Similar to the latter, this article follows the stem-as-citeword standard.

- Infinitive: koşmak ("to run")
- Stem: koş- ("run")

In Turkish, the verbal stem is also the second-person singular imperative form. Example:

koş- (stem meaning "run")
Koş! ("Run!")

Many verbs are formed from nouns by addition of -le. For example:

köpek – "dog"
köpekle – "dog paddle" (in any of several ways)

The aorist tense of a verb is formed by adding -(i/e)r. The plural of a noun is formed by suffixing -ler. Hence, the suffix -ler can indicate either a plural noun or a finite verb:

Köpek + ler – "(They are) dogs."
Köpekle + r – "S/he dog paddles."

Most adjectives can be treated as nouns, forms of address or pronouns. For example, genç can mean "young", "young person", or "the young person being referred to".

An adjective or noun can stand, as a modifier, before a noun. If the modifier is a noun (but not a noun of material), then the second noun word takes the inflectional suffix -i:

ak diş – "white tooth"
altın diş – "gold tooth"
köpek dişi – "canine tooth"

Comparison of adjectives is not done by inflecting adjectives or adverbs, but by other means (described below).

Adjectives can serve as adverbs, sometimes by means of repetition:

yavaş – "slow"
yavaş yavaş – "slowly"

== Word order ==
A general rule of Turkish word order is that the modifier precedes the modified:

- adjective (used attributively) precedes noun;
- adverb precedes verb;
- object of postposition precedes postposition.

Although the most common order of Turkish transitive sentences is subject–object–verb (SOV), all six permutations are valid (the subject and object are distinguished by case suffixes). The word order serves to express the theme and focus (rheme) of the sentence: the sentence-initial portion is associated with the topic; the position just before the verb is used for the focus; and the post-verbal position is used for background or clarifying information.

The following sentences illustrate how subject–object–verb order changes the meaning.

Word order	Gloss	Notes
SOV	Ali eve gidiyor. Ali to-house is-going Ali is going home.	
OSV	Eve Ali gidiyor. to-house Ali is-going Ali is going home.	
SVO	Ali gidiyor eve. Ali is-going to-house Ali is going home.	
OVS	Eve gidiyor Ali. to-house is-going Ali; Ali is going home.	Same as SOV (anacoluthon).
VSO	Gidiyor Ali eve. is-going Ali to-house There goes Ali home.	Anacoluthon
VOS	Gidiyor eve Ali. is-going to-house Ali; There goes Ali home.	Anacoluthon

Meanings may be different depending on emphasis.

In one study, only about half of the transitive sentences used by a sample of Turkish speakers were found to be in the SOV order.

When a sentence has multiple informational components, the stressed component is positioned just before the verb:

Ali bugün eve arabayla gidiyor.
Ali today to-house by-car is-going
Today, Ali is going to the house by car.

Ali eve arabayla bugün gidiyor.
Ali to-house by-car today is-going
Today, Ali is going to the house by car.

Ali arabayla bugün eve gidiyor.
Ali by-car today to-house is-going
Today, Ali is going to the house by car.

== Morpheme order ==
The order of morphemes in Turkish is often opposite to English:

Turkish	English	Comment
Avrupa	Europe	
Avrupalı	of Europe / European	adjective (European)
Avrupalılaş	become European	(intransitive) verb root
Avrupalılaştır	Europeanise	(transitive) verb root
Avrupalılaştırama	be unable to Europeanise	negated verb root
Avrupalılaştıramadık	we couldn't Europeanise	finite verb
Avrupalılaştıramadık	one unable to be Europeanised	noun
Avrupalılaştıramadıklar	those unable to be Europeanised	plural
Avrupalılaştıramadıklarımız	those whom we couldn't manage to Europeanise	possessive, 1st person plural
Avrupalılaştıramadıklarımızdan	of those whom we couldn't manage to Europeanise	ablative case
Avrupalılaştıramadıklarımızdanmış	is reportedly of those whom we couldn't manage to Europeanise	inferential copula
Avrupalılaştıramadıklarımızdanmışsınız	you are reportedly of those whom we couldn't manage to Europeanise	2nd person plural/formal
Avrupalılaştıramadıklarımızdanmışsınızcasına	as if you were reportedly of those whom we couldn't manage to Europeanise	Adverb of equalization/possibility

The above example is also illustrative of the productive nature of Turkish suffixes in creating new verbs, nouns, etc. Note that the word Avrupalılaştıramadık can be a verb, a participle or a noun; in this parse, it is a participle, or verbal adjective, that is used as a noun.

The longest published word in Turkish, muvaffakiyetsizleştiricileştiriveremeyebileceklerimizdenmişsinizcesine, means "as if you are one of those that we cannot easily convert into an unsuccessful-person-maker" (i.e., someone who un-educates people to make them unsuccessful).

== Inflectional suffixes ==
For case endings, see § Case

The plural suffix (çoğul eki) can be used with nouns and with third-person verbs:

- -ler (front vowel harmony: e, i, ö, ü)
- -lar (back vowel harmony: a, ı, o, u)

Nouns are derived from verbs in several ways. The number of ways of forming verbal nouns (fiil isimleri) from verb-stems can be debated; here are three:

Verbal-noun suffixes
description	suffix
infinitive (mastar "template")	-mek^{2}
gerund	-me^{2}
"way of doing VERB"	-(y)iş^{4}

Several series of endings show distinctions of person (kişi); they are given here, along with the personal pronouns for comparison:

Indicators of person
person		1st		2nd			3rd	
number		sg	pl	sg	pl	dpl	sg/pl	pl
personal pronouns		ben	biz	sen	siz	sizler	o	onlar
possessive suffixes (iyelik ekleri)		-(i)m	-(i)miz	-(i)n	-(i)niz	-(i)niz	-(s)i	-leri
personal endings (kişi ekleri)	predicative (I)	-(y)im	-(y)iz	-sin	-siniz	-siniz	—	-ler
personal endings (kişi ekleri)	verbal (II)	-m	-k	-n	-niz	-niz	—	-ler
personal endings (kişi ekleri)	optative (III)	-(y)eyim	-(y)elim	-(y)esin	-(y)esiniz	-(y)esiniz	-(y)e	-(y)eler
personal endings (kişi ekleri)	imperative (IV)			—	-(y)in	-(y)in(iz)	-sin	-sinler

The names given to the personal endings here are not standard. These endings are often just referred to as type I, II, III, and IV respectively; but the order in which the types are numbered is also not standard. Lewis (1967) refers to the suffixes of possession as "personal" endings.

In the third person, plural number is not always explicitly marked, and the same form is used for both singular and plural. If the plural suffix -ler is used, it combines with the personal endings as indicated in the final column of the table.

A "suffix of possession" gives the person of the possessor of the object named by the noun to which the suffix is attached; it also indicates a subject for a participle. (See § Possession.)

A "predicative" ending can assign a person to a noun, thus creating a complete sentence:

insan "human" → İnsanım. "I am a human."

See also § Predication and Turkish copula.

All of the personal suffixes can be used in the formation of verbs. Verb-stems have been mentioned. A verb-base is obtained from a verb-stem by attachment of certain suffixes or characteristics given below. Then the personal endings here called "predicative" and "verbal" attach only to verb-bases; the optative and imperative endings attach to verb-stems.

Verb characteristics
with predicative endings	progressive		-mekte (infinitive -mek + locative suffix -te)
with predicative endings	necessitative		-meli
with predicative endings	aorist (habitual)	positive	-(i/e)r
with predicative endings	aorist (habitual)	negative	-mez
with predicative endings	aorist (habitual)	impotential	-(y)emez
with predicative endings	future		-(y)ecek
with predicative endings	inferential past		-miş
with predicative endings	imperfective (Note: The imperfective aspect is often called "present", though it is not actually present tense.)		-iyor
with verbal endings	definite past		-di
with verbal endings	conditional		-se

The first syllable of the imperfective suffix (-iyor) exhibits vowel harmony while the second is invariable. When suffixed to a stem ending in a vowel, that vowel is elided: ye- + -iyor → yiyor. The aorist negative and impotential forms are given here because they are anomalous. The -z of the aorist negative (-mez) and impotential (-(y)emez) is dropped in the first-person singular and plural, in order to be able to suffix it (but is retained when the interrogative particle mi intervenes; see below). (Aorist negative first-person singular: -mem; but: aorist impotential third-person plural: -(y)emezler.)

See also Negation and potential in verb-stems under § Verbs below.

Some third-person verbs also function as participles. Participles can be classified as personal, if they take a suffix of possession, and impersonal, if they do not. The following suffixes attach to verb-stems:

Participial endings
		impersonal	personal
aorist	positive	-(i/e)r	
aorist	negative	-mez	
aorist	impotential	-(y)emez	
imperfective		-(y)en	
future		-(y)ecek	
past		-miş	-dik

The interrogative particle (soru eki) is not written as a suffix, but phonetically it is enclitic; in particular, it exhibits vowel harmony:

- mi (front-unrounded vowel harmony: i, after e and i)
- mı (back-unrounded vowel harmony: ı, after a and ı)
- mu (back-rounded vowel harmony: u, after o and u)
- mü (front-rounded vowel harmony: ü, after ö and ü)

Person marks attach to the end of the particle: Geliyorsun. "you're coming" vs Geliyor musun? "Are you coming?"

== Nouns ==
=== Inflection ===
Turkish nouns have no gender. The dictionary-form of a noun can take up to four types of inflectional suffixes, generally in the following order:

1. plural suffix;
2. suffix of possession (iyelik eki from iye "owner");
3. case-ending;
4. personal suffix (kişi eki from kişi "person").

Through its presence or absence, the plural ending shows distinctions of number.

==== Number ====
A noun is made plural by addition of -ler or -lar (depending on the vowel harmony). When a numeral is used with a noun, however, the plural suffix is usually not used:

baş	"head"
başlar	"[some] heads"
beş baş	"five head(s)", but
Beşevler	"Five Houses" (district of Bursa)

The plural ending also allows a family (living in one house) to be designated by a single member:

Aliler	"Ali and his family"
teyze	"maternal aunt"
teyzem	"my maternal aunt"
teyzemler	"my maternal aunt and her family"

In the last example, the first-person singular suffix of possession comes before the plural ending; this is an exception to the order of suffixes given above. In the usual order, we have:

teyzelerim "my maternal aunts"

Nouns are pluralized in standard temporal greetings.

gün ("day") – İyi günler! ("Good day!")
yıl ("year") – Mutlu yıllar! ("Happy new year!")

==== Possession ====
As noted earlier, the suffixes of possession give the person (and number) of the possessor of what is named by the noun:

Suffixes of Possession (iyelik ekleri)
	1st	2nd	3rd
singular	-(i)m	-(i)n	-(s)i
plural	-(i)miz	-(i)niz	-leri

When a word takes one of the endings of possession, the word becomes the name of something possessed, not possessing. The word for the possessor, if present, takes the genitive case ending.

Examples with teyze ("maternal aunt")
Example	Composition	Translation
teyzen	teyze "maternal aunt" + -n "belonging to you (singular)"	"your maternal aunt"
teyzeniz	teyze "maternal aunt" + -niz "belonging to you (plural)"	"your maternal aunt"
teyzelerin	teyze "maternal aunt" + -ler- (plural suffix) + -in "belonging to you (singular)"	"your maternal aunts"
teyzeleriniz	teyze "maternal aunt" + -ler- (plural suffix) + -iniz "belonging to you (plural)"	"your maternal aunts"

The plural ending will not be attached twice to the same word; therefore ambiguity is possible:

fikir	"idea"
fikirleri	"their idea" or "their ideas" or "his/her ideas"

Ambiguity can be resolved with pronouns.

==== Case ====
The Turkish language is normally described as having six cases, whose names in English are borrowed from Latin grammar. The case endings (durum ekleri 'ending condition') are regular and subject to vowel harmony.

The postposition ile is often absorbed onto the noun as -(y)le, and some authors analyse this as an instrumental and comitative case. As it differs from the other case markers in several ways, it may be considered as an "inflectional marker" but not a case marker. In particular, unlike the other case endings, -(y)le is never accentuated. Also, when combined with the personal pronouns, the demonstratives, or the interrogative kim, they are traditionally used in the genitive, e.g., kiminle 'with whom', not *kimle. However, using -(y)le directly with personal as well as demonstrative pronouns as in the case with other case endings by bypassing the obligatory genitive case has become common usage. So words like benle, senle, onla, bizle, sizle, onlarla, kimle, neyle are used very often.

Cases and their endings
Case	Turkish Name	Ending	Example		Translation	
Absolute	yalın ("bare") durum	-∅-	ev ("house")	adam ("man")	"(the) house"	"(the) man"
Definite accusative	belirtme ("clarifying") durumu	-(y)ı-, -(y)i-, -(y)u-, -(y)ü-	evi	adamı	"the house"	"the man"
Dative	yönelme ("facing-towards") durumu	-(y)a-, -(y)e-	eve	adama	"to the house"	"to the man"
Locative	bulunma ("being-present") durumu	-da-, -de-, -ta-, -te-	evde	adamda	"at home"	"in/on the man"
Ablative	çıkma ("going-out") durumu	-dan-, -den-, -tan-, -ten-	evden	adamdan	"from the house"	"from the man"
Genitive	tamlayan ("compounding") eki	-(n)ın-, -(n)in-, -(n)un-, -(n)ün-	evin	adamın	"the house's"	"the man's"
Instrumental	vasıta ("means") eki	-(y)le-, -(y)la-	evle	adamla	"with the house"	"with the man"

If a case ending is attached to a demonstrative pronoun (which ends in o or u), or to a noun that has already taken a third-person ending of possession, or to a compound noun where the second word is already suffixed, then the case ending is preceded by n (and the parenthetical y is not used). For instance: "Türk yemeklerini seviyorum.", "I love Turkish food."

Cases and their endings (nouns already suffixed with third-person ending)
Case	Turkish Name	Ending	Example		Translation	
Absolute	yalın ("bare") durum	-∅-	evi ("his/her house")	adamı ("his/her man")	"(his/her) house"	"(his/her) man"
Definite accusative	belirtme ("clarifying") durumu	-nı-, -ni-, -nu-, -nü-	evini	adamını	"his/her house"	"his/her man"
Dative	yönelme ("going-towards") durumu	-na-, -ne-	evine	adamına	"to his/her house"	"to his/her man"
Locative	bulunma ("being-present") durumu	-nda-, -nde-	evinde	adamında	"at his/her home"	"in/on his/her man"
Ablative	çıkma ("going-out") durumu	-ndan-, -nden-	evinden	adamından	"from his/her house"	"from his/her man"
Genitive	tamlayan ("compounding") eki	-nın-, -nin-, -nun-, -nün-	evinin	adamının	"his/her house's"	"his/her man's"

===== Absolute case =====
The absolute case combines the uses of the nominative, vocative, and (in part) accusative cases. It is for subjects, and for names of people being addressed. It is also used for indefinite direct objects.

şiir	"poem"	(absolute case)
Şiir okur.	"S/he reads a poem/poetry."	(absolute case, indefinite direct object)

===== Definite accusative case =====
For definite direct objects, the definite accusative case is used.

Şiiri okur.	"S/he reads the poem."	(accusative case, definite direct object)

===== Dative case =====
The dative case indicates the recipient of the action, or the place to which the action is directed. It approximates the meaning of the English prepositions "to" and "into", and also "in" (when it can be replaced with "into"):

Birayı buzdolabına koy.
the-beer into-icebox put
"Put the beer in(to) the fridge."

Güneşin batışına bak.
sun's at-its-sinking look
"Look at the sunset."

Hükümete güven.
to-government trust
"Trust the government."

Note: in English, the last example happens to appear as a direct object, but it is dative in many languages – "(give) trust to the government."

===== Locative case =====
The locative case tells where, hence corresponds to the English prepositions "at", "on", and "in" (when it does not mean "into").

ev "house" → evde "at home"

Buzdolabında	dört	bira	var
in-icebox	four	beer	exist
"There are four beers in the fridge."

===== Ablative case =====
The ablative case tells whence, that is, the place from which (or through which), hence:

- material out of which something is made;

kumdan yapılmış kale
of-sand made castle
"castle made of sand"

- a cause by which something is effected;

açlıktan öl
of-hunger die
"die of hunger"

- that to which other things are being compared (see #Adjectives below).

===== Genitive case =====
The genitive case indicates a "compounding" (tamlayan) word. The corresponding "compounded" (tamlanan) word will take the appropriate suffix of possession. The pair of these words is then a definite compound (belirtili tamlama):

anne	"mother"
annesi	"her mother"
Ayşe'nin annesi	"Ayşe's mother"

(The apostrophe in Turkish is used before inflectional suffixes attached to proper nouns, but it is nothing more than an orthographic convention – proper nouns use the same declension system as ordinary nouns.)

However, if two nouns are connected, but not by ownership, then the second noun generally takes an ending of possession, while the first takes no ending. The result is an indefinite compound (belirtisiz tamlama):

Türkiye'nin Cumhurbaşkanı	"The President of Turkey" (definite)
Türkiye Cumhuriyeti	"The Republic of Turkey" (indefinite)

If one noun names a material, the other noun need not take an ending:

nikâh yüzüğü	"wedding ring"
altın yüzük	"gold ring"

The genitive case can also be used for the subject of some complement or adjunct clauses:

- Annemizin uzak bir semtte oturmasına rağmen, her gün ona uğruyoruz. // Although our mother lives in a remote neighborhood, we visit her every day."
- Başkanın vermesi gerekiyor. // The president needs to give it.
- Tuğçe bizim Ankara'ya gitmemizi istedi. // Tuğçe wanted us to go to Ankara.
- Ben Ali'nin camı kırdığı zamanı biliyordum. // I knew when Ali broke the glass.

===== Instrumental case =====
The instrumental case functions as both an instrumental and a comitative.

Deniz'le konuştuk	"Deniz and we spoke." (Note: The literal "We spoke with Deniz" may be incorrect in this case.)
çekiçle vur	"hit with a hammer"
Onunla konuştuk	"He and we spoke." (Note: The literal "We spoke with him" may be incorrect in this case.)

==== Predication ====
If a noun is to be in the first or second person, one of the predicative suffixes (or type-I personal suffixes) will show this.

	1st	2nd	3rd
singular	-(y)im	-sin	—
plural	-(y)iz	-siniz	-ler

Examples

dünya "world" → Dünyayız. "We are the world."
çocuk "child" → Çocuklarsınız. "You are the children"

In the third person, no ending is required. However, the ending -dir can be used; it is said to be the remnant of a verb turur "S/he stands". Again in the third person, the plural suffix may be used:

Türk or Türktür	"S/he is Turkish"
Türkler or Türktürler	"They are Turkish"
Türklerdir	"They are the Turks"

Several suffixes can be combined:

ev- -iniz -de- -yim
house your at {I am}
{} PL LOC 1SG.PRED
"I am at your house."

=== Verbal nouns ===
The infinitive, formed with -mek as noted earlier, does not take a suffix of possession, or the genitive case-ending. It does take all other case-endings. In particular, the progressive characteristic given earlier is the infinitive ending with the locative ending:

Konuşmaktayız – "We are in (the act of) speaking."
Savaşmaktayız – "We are in warmaking", that is, "We are at war."

The verbal noun in -me is called a gerund above, since it corresponds roughly to the English gerund.

bekle "wait" → bekleme "waiting": bekleme odası "waiting room"

The verbal noun can take a suffix of possession and any case-ending:

Beklemeniz lâzım.
your-waiting necessary
"You have to wait."

Sesini duymayı seviyorum.
your-voice-ACC hearing-ACC I-love
"I like to hear your voice."

The dative form of a Turkish gerund can correspond precisely to an English infinitive with to:

Ülkemizde nano teknolojik ürünler üretilmeye başlandı.
In-our-country nano technological products to-be-produced began
"Nano-technological products began to be produced in our country."

The suffix -iş can also be used to create verbal nouns:

Verb	Noun
yürü- "walk"	yürüyüş "walk, walking"
yağ- "rain"	yağış "rain"
al- "take" + ver- "give/spend"	alışveriş "shopping"
yara- "be of use", yaratıl- "be created"	yaratılış "creation"

The verb et- "make, do" can be considered as an auxiliary verb, since for example it is often used with verbal nouns borrowed from other languages, such as Arabic:

kabul et- "accept" (kabul "[an] accepting");
reddet- "reject" (ret "[a] rejecting");
ziyaret et- "visit"  (ziyaret "[a] visiting").

Considered as units, these are transitive verbs; but the nouns in them can also, by themselves, take direct objects:

Antalya'yı ziyaret "visit to Antalya".

What looks like an ablative gerund is usually an adverb; the ending -meden usually has the sense of "without". See #Adverbs below.

An infinitive in the absolute case can be the object of a verb such as iste- "want":

Kimi eğitime devam etmek, kimi de çalışmak istiyor.
some-of-them towards-education continuation make some-of-them also work want
Some want to continue their education, and some want to work" (source: Cumhuriyet Pazar Dergi, 14 August 2005, p. 1.)

Note here that the compound verb devam et- "continue, last" does not take a direct object, but is complemented by a dative noun.

Another way to express obligation (besides with lâzım as in the earlier example) is by means of zor "trouble, compulsion" and an infinitive:

Gitmek zoru "Go compulsion",
Gitmek zorundayız "We must go".

(Source: same as the last example.)

Both an infinitive and a gerund are objects of the postposition için "for" in the third sentence of the quotation within the following quotation:

Tesis yetkilileri,
"Bölge insanları genelde tutucu.
Sahil kesimleri
yola yakın olduğu için
rahat bir şekilde göle giremiyorlar.
Biz de
hem yoldan geçenlerin görüş açısını kapatmak
hem de erkeklerin rahatsız etmemesi için
paravan kullanıyoruz"
dedi.
Ancak paravanın aralarından
çocukların karşı tarafı gözetlemeleri
engellenemedi.

— Cumhuriyet, 9 August 2005, p. 1.
Translation:

Facility its-authorities
"District its-people in-general conservative.
Shore its-sections
to-road near their-being for
comfortable a in-form to-lake they-cannot-enter.
We also
both from-road of-passers sight their-angle to-close
and men's uncomfortable their-not-making for
screen we-are-using"
they-said.
But curtain's from-its-gaps
children's other side their-spying
cannot-be-hindered.

A free translation is:

The facility authorities said: "The people of this district [namely Edremit, Van] are generally conservative. They cannot enter the lake comfortably, because the shore areas are near the road. So we are using a screen, both to close off the view of passersby on the road, and so that men will not cause discomfort." However, children cannot be prevented from spying on the other side through gaps in the screen.

=== Auxiliary verbs ===
Certain verbs in Turkish are used to enhance the meaning of other verbs, or to agglutinate verbs from nouns. These verbs are called auxiliary verbs. A concise list follows:

Verbs that are used with nouns to agglutinate new verbs

- etmek (to do)
- olmak (to be)
- kılmak (to make)
- eylemek (to make)

Examples

- farz (assumption) → farz etmek (to assume)
- hak (right) → hak etmek (to deserve)
- af (amnesty) → affetmek (to excuse)
- kayıp (loss) → kaybetmek (to lose)
- terk (leaving) → terk etmek (to leave)
- arz (submission, supply) → arz etmek (to submit, to supply)

If there is a change in the noun root through the process of agglutination, it is written adjacently. These are mostly Arabic loan-words, which switch to their more original form.

In Turkish words, two consonants of a syllable need a vowel to be pronounced. There are exceptions in loan words only, but those that lost their original form are more common. This occurs in two ways:

If a word ends in two identical consonants, one is dropped, e.g. hall ("state, status") becomes hal; aff ("amnesty, forgiving") becomes af.

If a syllable ends in two different consonants, a vowel is added between them; e.g., hükm ("judgement") becomes hüküm.

Exceptions: Words which end in ht, nk, rt, rk, such as taht ("throne"), renk ("colour"), kart ("card"), do not add a vowel. Most of these are loan-words from Persian or Western languages (but zevk "pleasure" from Arabic ذَوْق).

Examples

Noun & Auxiliary Verb	Verb	Notes
kayıp + etmek	kaybetmek ("to lose")	kayıp ("lost") was originally kayb, an Arabic loanword
haciz + etmek	haczetmek ("to sequester")	haciz ("sequestration") was originally hacz, an Arabic loanword
haz + etmek	hazzetmek ("to relish, enjoy")	haz ("delight") was originally hazz, an Arabic loanword

Verbs that are used with other verbs to enhance the meaning:

- -(i)vermek (implies urgency)
- -(e)bilmek (implies ability)
- -(e)durmak (implies continuity)
- -(e)gelmek (implies repetition)
- -(a)kalmak (implies continuity)
- -(e)yazmak (implies a close escape)
- -(e)görmek (implies a warning)

Examples

- düş- (fall) → düşeyazdım (I almost fell)
- git- (go) → gidiverdim (I just went)
- yavaşla- (slow down) → yavaşlayabilirim (I can slow down)
- yaz- (write) → yazaduruyorlar (they keep on writing)
- söylen- (be told) → söylenegelir (keeps being told)

== Adjectives ==
Adjectives used attributively precede the noun; used predicatively, they follow, unless something other than word order shows that they are being used predicatively:

Attributive	yeşil çim	"[the] green grass"
Predicative	Çim yeşil(dir).	"Grass is green."
Predicative	Yeşildir çim.	"Grass is green."

Used predicatively, adjectives take the same personal suffixes as nouns:

young	genç
I am young	gencim
you (sing.) are young	gençsin
he/she/it is young	genç(tir)
we are young	genciz
you (pl.) are young	gençsiniz
they are young	genç(tir)(ler)

=== Descriptive adjectives ===
Most adjectives in the dictionary are descriptive. The two most fundamental descriptive adjectives are:

- var ("existing")
- yok ("not existing")

These are used only predicatively:

- with the sense of the English "There is" and "There is not":

Gökte bir bulut yok.
in-the-sky a cloud not-existing
"There is not a cloud in the sky."

- in the construction that supplies the lack of a verb "have":

Balcının var bal tası, Oduncunun var baltası.
honey-seller's exists honey his-pot wood-cutter's exists his-axe
"The honey-seller has a honey-pot; the wood-cutter has an axe."

(This is a proverbial expression; the more usual order would make the saying, Balcının bal tası var, oduncunun baltası var).

=== Indefinite adjectives ===
The cardinal number bir ("one") can be used as an indefinite article. Word order can make a difference:

güzel bir gün – "a nice day"
bir güzel gün – "one fine day"

Unless it is being used by itself, elliptically, the adjective hiç ("no") requires an additional word with negative force:

Hiç param yok.
no my-money there-is-not
"I have no money."

Hiçbir adam ada değildir.
no-one man island is-not
"No man is an island."

Compare:

- Bir şey görüyorum. – "I see something."
- Hiçbir şey görmüyorum. – "I don't see anything."

=== Comparison ===
In a positive comparison, the object takes the ablative case; the adverb daha ("more") is optional, unless the object is left out.

tüyden (daha) hafif
feather-ABL (more) light
"lighter than a feather"

In a negative comparison, the adverb az ("less") is needed; the object still takes the ablative; daha can still be used as well.

kurşundan (daha) az ağır
lead-ABL (more) less heavy
"less heavy than lead"

The superlative degree is expressed by the adverb en ("most").

en büyük yalancı
most big liar
"the biggest liar"

en az güvenilir
most less trust-
"the least trustworthy"

=== Participles ===
It is noted under #Parts of speech that Turkish participles (sıfat-fiiller) can be classified as

- personal, if they take a suffix of possession;
- impersonal, if they do not.

In a personal participle, the suffix of possession signifies the subject of the underlying verb; if this possessor is third person, then the possessor may be further specified with a noun in the genitive case.

The noun modified by a personal participle as an adjective may be the direct object of the underlying verb; the connection may also be more vague.

The noun modified by an impersonal participle is generally the subject of the underlying verb (but see Lewis (1967: IX,2)).

The aorist tense (geniş zaman "broad time") is for habitual actions; the present tense (şimdiki zaman "time that is now") is for actions ongoing or contemplated.

==== Aorist ====
– akarsu
– çıkmaz
– inilir
– sürdürülebilir turizm

Translation:

"flowing water", from ak- (to flow)
"cul-de-sac", from çık- (to exit)
"got down from" (sign at rear door of bus), from in- (to go down)
"tourism that can be continued", i.e. "sustainable tourism", from sür- (to go on)

==== Present ====
Silahları çekip
havaya ateş açan
AKP'liler hakkında
yasal işlem başlatılmadı.

— Birgün Halkın Gazetesi, 25 July 2005
Translation:

Guns pulling-out-and
to-air fire opening
AKP-members about-them
legal process was-not-begun.

that is, "No legal process has begun concerning the AKP members who pulled out guns and fired them in the air"; for -ip see #Adverbs below.

Geçen hafta

Translation:

Passing week

that is, "last week";

==== Future ====
– gelecek hafta
– okuyacağım bir kitap
– okunacak bir kitap

Translation:

"the week that will come", that is, "next week"
"a book that I shall read", from oku- (to read)
"a book that will be read", from okun- (to be read)

==== Past/present ====
– okunmuş bir kitap
– okuduğum bir kitap
– Yaşamın bittiği yer'de hayat

Translation:

"a book that was read"
"a book that I read/am reading"
"Life in 'the place where life ends'", from bit- (to end)

A personal participle can be construed as a noun and used in parallel with verbal nouns:

Çocukların
yüzde 68'i evinin ihtiyaçlarına katkıda bulunmak,
yüzde 21'i ailesi istediği için,
yüzde altısı iş öğrenmek ve meslek edinmek için,
yüzde 4'ü ihtiyaçlarını karşılamak için
çalışıyor.

— Birgün Halkın Gazetesi, 13 August 2005, p. 1.
Translation:

Children's
in-100 their-68 house's for-its-needs in-aid be-found,
in-100 their-21 their-family that-they-wanted for,
in-100 their-six work learn and profession be-made for,
in-100 their-4 their-needs meet for
are-working.

that is, "Children are working, 68% to provide for their family's needs, 21% because their family wants it, 6% to learn a job or profession, 4% to meet their [own] needs."

The following sentence from a newspaper headline contains twenty-two words, nine derived from verbs, four of these as participles, three as gerunds. Note also the use of kontrol from French as a verbal noun with et-:

Türkiye'nin AB'ye girmemesi ve
İslam dünyasına yaklaşması halinde
şeriatçılığın kucağına itilmiş olacağını
söyleyen Fransız senatör Duireux,
İslami akımların
kontrol edilmesi
gerektiğini
belirtti.

— Cumhuriyet, 17 July 2005.
Translation:

Turkey's to-the-EU its-not-entering and
Islam to-its-world its-drawing-near in-its-state
sharia-favorer-ness's to-its-embrace pushed that-it-will-be
saying French senator Duireux,
Islamic current's
control its-being-made
that-it-is-necessary
he-made-clear.

In other words:

Saying that, by not joining the EU and by drawing close to the Islamic world, Turkey would be pushed into the lap of those who favor sharia, French senator Duireux made clear that it was necessary to control the Islamic tide.

=== Intensification ===
Turkish adjectives can be intensified with intensifying (pekiştirme) prefixes.

If the adjective begins with a consonant the prefix is the consonant + the following vowel + m, p, r, or s. p operates as the default, and is the most common form. Forms in r and m are rare. There is no single rule that governs the choice of the final consonant. This choice tends to minimize featural similarity with consonants in the base adjective, in particular, the first and second consonants:

- siyah ("black") → simsiyah ("pitch black")
- güzel ("pretty") → güpgüzel ("very pretty")
- temiz ("clean") → tertemiz ("clean as a pin")
- katı ("hard") → kaskatı ("hard as a rock")

If the adjective begins with a vowel, the prefix consists of this vowel + p:

- uzun ("long") → upuzun ("very long")

The vowel is sometimes also added after the consonant:

- sağlam ("healthy") → sapasağlam ("very healthy") (sapsağlam also exists)
- yalnız ("alone") → yapayalnız ("all alone") (yapyalnız also exists)
- gündüz ("daytime") → güpegündüz ("broad daylight") (güpgündüz also exists)
- çevre ("environmental") → çepeçevre ("all around") (çepçevre also exists)

There are also some irregular suffixes:

- çıplak ("naked") → çırılçıplak ("stark naked") (çırçıplak also exist)
- sıklam ("wetness") → sırılsıklam ("soaking wet") (sırsıklam also exists)
- karışık ("complex") → karmakarışık ("totally complex")
- dağınık ("untidy") → darmadağınık ("very untidy") (dapdağınık and dasdağınık also exist)
- renk ("colored") → rengârenk ("multicolored")
- deli ("mad") → zırdeli ("raving mad")
- parça ("piece") → paramparça ("in pieces")

Some adjectives have more than one intensified form:

- düz ("flat"): düpdüz (24.1%), dümdüz (78.1%) ("very flat", 2 forms) (the irregular düpedüz also exists)
- yaş ("fresh"): yapyaş (44.8%), yamyaş (58.6%) ("very fresh", 2 forms)
- sefil ("miserable"): sepsefil (24.1%), semsefil (6.8%), sersefil (66.6%) ("very miserable", 3 forms)
- geniş ("large"): gepgeniş (77%), gemgeniş (9.15%), gesgeniş (6.8%), gergeniş (5.7%) ("very large", 4 forms)
- topaç (""): toptopaç (47.15%), tomtopaç (5.75%), tostopaç (33.3%), tortopaç (3.4%) ("very ", 4 forms)

This process is also called emphatic reduplication. It is applied only to particular common adjectives (between 100 and 215 depending on sources), and not to new adjectives which enter Turkish. However, native speakers are able to produce novel forms when asked to do so.

==== Full reduplication (as distinct from emphatic prefixation) ====
Turkish also employs full reduplication as a means of intensification. Unlike emphatic prefixation, this process involves the repetition of the entire base (or a phonologically identical form), rather than the insertion of an intensifying consonant.

Examples include:

- tıpatıp ("exactly alike"), from tıpkı
- birebir ("exactly the same")
- teker teker ("one by one")
- adım adım ("step by step")

== Adverbs ==
The adverb of negation is değil. It is used to negate sentences that are without verb or var; then it takes the appropriate personal ending:

Evde değilim "I am not at home."

A number of adverbs are derived from verbs:

The ending -e is seen in:

Güle güle "[Go] smilingly" (said to somebody departing);
Güle güle kullanın "Use [it] smilingly" (said to somebody with a new acquisition);
Beşe çeyrek kala kalktım "To-five a-quarter remaining I-got-up", that is, 
                         "I got up at a quarter to five";
Onu yirmi geçe uyudun "You slept at twenty past ten" 
                      (uyu- "sleep", although uy- "heed").

The ending -erek denotes action at the same time as, or preceding, that of another verb:

Geceyi konuşarak geçirdik
the-night talking we-caused-to-pass
"We spent the night talking."

Akıl yürüterek bu sonuca ulaşıyorum
"By using reason, I arrived at this conclusion" [the latter is Bülent Ecevit as quoted in Cumhuriyet, 20 July 2005].

Doğaya en az zarar vererek yaşamak
"To live while giving the least harm to nature" [Buğday magazine, 7–8/2005, no 32].

From ol- "be, become", olarak forms adverbial phrases corresponding to those in English with "as":

Size bir dost olarak söylüyorum
To-you a friend as I'm-telling
"I'm telling you this as a friend"

ciddi olarak "seriously" (ciddi "serious").

The ending -meden on a verb-stem looks like the ablative gerund, but it is not (Lewis [XI,12]). It indicates an action not occurring at all, or following that of the main verb:

Bakmadan atlama "Don't leap without looking";
Bakmadan önce atlama "Don't leap before looking."

Bir soruyu cevaplamadan tartışmak, tartışmadan cevaplamaktan iyidir
A particular-question without-answering to-debate without-debating from-to-answer is-good,
"It is better to debate without answering than to answer without debating." (Source of the last sentence: Joseph Joubert as quoted on p. 20 of Gündelik Bilmeceler by Partha Ghose and Dipankar Home, translated by Özlem Özbal, Tübitak Popüler Bilim Kitapları 25, Ankara, 1996.)

Complementing önce "before" is sonra "after", which can follow a verb-stem given the ending -dikten:

Baktıktan sonra atla "After looking, leap";
Ayşe baktıktan sonra Neşe atladı "After Ayşe looked, Neşe leapt."

Simultaneity is expressed by iken or its (not enclitic) suffixed form -(y)ken; but if it follows a verb, then the verb appears, not as a stem, but as a base; see #Bases of verbs:

Eve girmekteyken, bir şey hatırladım "As I was entering the house, I remembered something";
Ben eve girmekteyken, telefon çaldı "As I was entering the house, the telephone rang."

If two verbs of the same grammatical form have the same subject, the endings on the first verb can be replaced by -ip; see the example under #Participles.

== Pronouns ==
The third-person personal pronoun o "she/he/it" is declined as if it were the noun on. The other persons, ben "I", sen "you (singular/informal)", biz "we", siz "you (plural/formal)", are declined like nouns, except for a vowel change in the dative and an anomalous genitive. All personal pronouns aside from onlar form their instrumental with the genitive form.

	singular			plural		
	1st	2nd	3rd	1st	2nd	3rd
absolute	ben	sen	o	biz	siz	onlar
accusative	beni	seni	onu	bizi	sizi	onları
dative	bana	sana	ona	bize	size	onlara
locative	bende	sende	onda	bizde	sizde	onlarda
ablative	benden	senden	ondan	bizden	sizden	onlardan
genitive	benim	senin	onun	bizim	sizin	onların
instrumental	benimle	seninle	onunla	bizimle	sizinle	onlarla

The absolute case is generally needed only for emphasis:

—Nasılsınız? "How are you?"
—İyiyim; siz nasılsınız? "I am fine; how are you?"
—Ben de iyiyim. "I too am fine."

The third-person pronoun can clear up an ambiguity mentioned above:

onların fikri	"their idea"
onların fikirleri	"their ideas"
onun fikirleri	"her [or his] ideas"

The pronoun o is also one of the demonstrative pronouns:

- o "that";
- bu "this";
- şu "this or that" (thing pointed to).

The latter two are declined like o (that is, treated as if they were bun and şun, and with the instrumental formed from the genitive in the singular though not in the plural).

The interrogative pronouns (and adjectives) are:

- kim "who";
- ne "what";
- hangi "which";
- kaç "how many" or "how much".

These appear in embedded questions but do not serve as true relative pronouns:

Buzdolabında kaç tane var, o bilir. – "S/he knows how many are in the refrigerator."

There is a suffix -ki that acts as a relative pronoun in that it creates what, in English, would be called relative clauses. It does not display vowel harmony, except in a few common formations:

benimki – "mine (that which is mine)"
buzdolabındaki bira – "beer that is in the refrigerator" (no vowel harmony)
bugünkü – "today's (which is today)" (with vowel harmony)
dünkü – "yesterday's (which was yesterday)" (with vowel harmony)

The reflexive pronoun (dönüşlü zamir from dön- "turn") is kendi "own, self":

Kendi kendinden korkma – "Do not be afraid of thyself."

Many of the indefinite adjectives can function as pronouns, taking case-endings.

== Verbs ==
=== Stems of verbs ===
Many stems in the dictionary are indivisible; others consist of endings attached to a root.

==== Verb-stems from nouns ====
The verb-stem temizle- "make clean" is the adjective temiz "clean" with the suffix -le; this suffix was mentioned earlier under Parts of speech in connection with the verb köpekle-. Many verbs are formed from nouns or adjectives with -le:

Noun	Verb
baş "head"	başla- "make a head", that is, "begin"
kilit "lock"	kilitle- "make locked", that is, "lock"
suç "crime"	suçla- "make crimed", that is, “blame”

==== Voice ====
A verbal root, or a verb-stem in -le, can be lengthened with certain extensions. If present, they appear in the following order, and they indicate distinctions of voice:

Extensions for voice
Voice	Ending	Notes
Reflexive	-(i)n	
Reciprocal	-(i)ş	
Causative	-t	after polysyllabic stems in -l, -r, or a vowel; and
Causative	-dir	in other cases; except:
Causative	-ir, -er, -it	after some monosyllabic stems; and
Causative		there are some other exceptional forms as well.
Passive	-il	after stems ending in a consonant other than -l; otherwise, same as reflexive.

These endings might seem to be inflectional in the sense of the § Introduction above, but their meanings are not always clear from their particular names, and dictionaries do generally give the resulting forms, so in this sense they are constructive endings.

The causative extension makes an intransitive verb transitive, and a transitive verb factitive. Together, the reciprocal and causative extension make the repetitive extension -(i)ştir.

Verb Root/Stem	New Verb	Voice
bul "find"	buluş "meet"	-uş (reciprocal)
bul "find"	bulun "be found/present"	-un (reflexive)
yıka "wash (something)"	yıkan "wash oneself"	-n (reflexive)
yıka "wash (something)"	yıkanıl "be washed"	-n (reflexive) + -ıl (passive)
kayna "(come to a) boil"	kaynat "(bring to a) boil"	-t (causitive)
öl "die"	öldür "kill"	-dür (causitive)
öldür "kill"	öldürt "have (someone) killed"	-t (causitive, factitive)
ara "look for"	araştır "investigate"	-ş (reciprocal) + -tır (causitive) = (repetitive)

==== Negation and potential in verb-stems ====
A dictionary-stem is positive; it can be made:

- negative, by addition of -me;
- impotential, by addition of -e and then -me.

Any of these three (kinds of) stems can be made potential by addition of -e and then -bil. The -bil is not enclitic, but represents the verb bil- "know, be able"; the first syllable of the impotential ending represents an obsolete verb u- "be powerful, able" Lewis [VIII,55]. So far then, there are six kinds of stems:

Paradigm for stems negative, impotential and potential
	English infinitive	English finite form
gel-	"come"	"come"
gelme-	"not come"	"do not come"
geleme-	"be unable to come"	"cannot come"
gelebil-	"be able to come"	"can come"
gelmeyebil-	"be able to not come"	"may not come"
gelemeyebil-	"able to be unable to come"	"may be unable to come"

Such stems are not used for aorist forms, which have their own peculiar means of forming negatives and impotentials.

Note that -ebil is one of several verbs that can be compounded to enhance meaning. See Auxiliary verbs.

=== Bases of verbs ===
The characteristics with which verb-bases are formed from stems are given under § Inflectional suffixes. Note again that aorist verbs have their own peculiar negative and impotential forms.

The progressive base in -mekte is discussed under § Verbal nouns. Another base, namely the necessitative (gereklilik), is formed from a verbal noun. The characteristic is -meli, where -li forms adjectives from nouns, and -me forms gerunds from verb-stems. A native speaker may perceive the ending -meli as indivisible; the analysis here is from #Lewis [VIII,30].

The present base is derived from the ancient verb yorı- "go, walk" #Lewis [VIII,16]; this can be used for ongoing actions, or for contemplated future actions.

The meaning of the aorist base is described under #Adjectives from verbs: participles.

There is some irregularity in first-person negative and impotential aorists. The full form of the base -mez (or (y)emez) reappears before the interrogative particle mi:

Gelmem "I do not come" (cf. Gelmez miyim "Do I not come?");
Gelmeyiz "We do not come" (cf. Gelmez miyiz "Do we not come?")

The definite past or di-past is used to assert that something did happen in the past. The inferential past or miş-past can be understood as asserting that a past participle is applicable now; hence it is used when the fact of a past event, as such, is not important; in particular, the inferential past is used when one did not actually witness the past event.

A newspaper will generally use the di-past, because it is authoritative. The need to indicate uncertainty and inference by means of the miş-past may help to explain the extensive use of ki in the newspaper excerpt at Turkish vocabulary#The conjunction ki.

The conditional (şart) verb could also be called "hypothetical"; it is used for remote possibilities, or things one might wish for. (See also #Compound bases.)

The various bases thus give distinctions of tense, aspect and mood. These can be briefly tabulated:

First-person singular verbs
Form	Suffix	Verb	English Translation
Progressive	-mekte	gelmekteyim	"I am in the process of coming"
Necessitative	-meli	gelmeliyim	"I must come"
Positive	-(i/e)r	gelirim	"I come"
Negative	-me(z)	gelmem	"I do not come"
Impotential	-(y)eme(z)	gelemem	"I cannot come"
Future	-(y)ecek	geleceğim	"I will come"
Inferential past	-miş	gelmişim	"It seems that I came"
Imperfective	-iyor	geliyorum	"I am coming"
Definite past	-di	geldim	"I came"
Conditional	-se	gelsem	"if only I came"

=== Questions ===
The interrogative particle mi precedes predicative (type-I) endings (except for the 3rd person plural -ler), but follows the complete verb formed from a verbal, type-II ending:

Geliyor musunuz? "Are you coming?" (but: Geliyorlar mı? "Are they coming?")
Geldiniz mi? "Did you come?"

=== Optative and imperative moods ===
Usually, in the optative (istek), only the first-person forms are used, and these supply the lack of a first-person imperative (emir). In common practice then, there is one series of endings to express something wished for:

Merged Optative & Imperative Moods
Number	Person	Ending	Example	English Translation
Singular	1st	-(y)eyim	Geleyim	"Let me come"
Singular	2nd	—	Gel	"Come (you, singular)"
Singular	3rd	-sin	Gelsin	"Let [her/him/it] come"
Plural	1st	-(y)elim	Gelelim	"Let us come"
Plural	2nd	-(y)in(iz)	Gelin	"Come (you, plural)"
Plural	3rd	-sinler	Gelsinler	"Let them come"

=== Copula ===
The copula in Turkish appears in only two variants―*imek, a defective verb often attached to the noun, and olmak, which is a detached regular auxiliary verb.

*Imek, derived from the ancient verb er- #Lewis [VIII,2], survives in Turkish only in the inferential past, perfective, and conditional:

- imiş,
- idi,
- ise.

The form iken given under #Adverbs from verbs is also descended from er-. Since no more bases are founded on the stem i-, this verb can be called defective. In particular, i- forms no negative or impotential stems; negation is achieved with the #Adverb of negation, değil, given earlier.

The i- bases are often turned into base-forming suffixes without change in meaning; the corresponding suffixes are

- -(y)miş,
- -(y)di,
- -(y)se,

where the y is used only after vowels. For example, Hasta imiş and Hastaymış both mean, "Apparently/Reportedly, he/she/it is ill".

The verb i- serves as a copula. When a copula is needed, but the appropriate base in i- does not exist, then the corresponding base in ol- is used; when used otherwise this stem means "become". Idir, a variant of imek, is used for emphasis.

The verb i- is irregular in the way it is used in questions: the particle mi always precedes it:

Kuş idi or Kuştu "It was a bird";
Kuş muydu? "Was it a bird?"

=== Compound bases ===
The bases so far considered can be called "simple". A base in i- can be attached to another base, forming a compound base. One can then interpret the result in terms of English verb forms by reading backwards. The following list is representative, not exhaustive:

- Past tenses:
  - continuous past: Geliyordum "I was coming";
  - aorist past: Gelirdim "I used to come";
  - future past: Gelecektim "I was going to come";
  - pluperfect: Gelmiştim "I had come";
  - necessitative past: Gelmeliydim "I should have come";
  - conditional past: Gelseydim "If only I had come."
- Inferential tenses:
  - continuous inferential: Geliyormuşum "It seems (they say) I am coming";
  - future inferential: Gelecekmişim "It seems I shall come";
  - aorist inferential: Gelirmişim "It seems I come";
  - necessitative inferential: Gelmeliymişim "They say I must come."

By means of ise or -(y)se, a verb can be made conditional in the sense of being the hypothesis or protasis of a complex statement:

önemli bir şey yapıyorsunuz "You are doing something important";
Önemli bir şey yapıyorsanız, rahatsız etmeyelim "If you are doing something important, let us not cause disturbance."

The simple conditional can be used for remote conditions:

Bakmakla öğrenilse, köpekler kasap olurdu "If learning by looking were possible, dogs would be butchers."
