= Abuse (disambiguation) =

Abuse is physical or mental mistreatment.

Abuse may also refer to:

- Abuse (video game), a 1996 video game published by Origin Systems and Electronic Arts
- Physical abuse
- Sexual abuse
- Substance abuse, the maladaptive use of drugs, alcohol and other substances
- Verbal abuse

== See also ==
- Abus (disambiguation)
- Abuse of language (disambiguation)
