= Verbal =

Verbal may refer to:

== People ==
- Verbal (rapper) (born 1975), Japanese rapper
- Verbal Kent (born 1978), American alternative hip hop artist
- Verbal Jint (born 1980), South Korean rapper

== Language ==
- Something expressed with speech, rather than writing
- Pertaining to verbs
  - Verbal noun, a noun formed from a corresponding verb
  - A nonfinite verb such as an infinitive, gerund, or participle (optionally together, known as a verbal phrase, with its modifiers or objects) functioning as a noun, adjective, or adverb
  - A word or group of words that functions as the head of a verb phrase
- Person characterised by verbosity or fluency
- Anything pertaining to language or the use of words, as opposed to nonverbal communication

== Other uses ==
- Roger "Verbal" Kint, a character in the 1995 film The Usual Suspects
- Verbal, a magazine published by the Verbal Arts Centre, Northern Ireland
- Verbal, a track on Amon Tobin's EP Verbal Remixes & Collaborations

== ==
- Procès-verbal, a legal term with a number of meanings
- Verbal abuse (disambiguation)
- Verbal agreement (disambiguation)
