= Turkish vocabulary =

Set of words within the Turkish language

Turkish vocabulary is the set of words within the Turkish language. The language widely uses agglutination and suffixes to form words from noun and verb stems. Besides native Turkic words, Turkish vocabulary is rich in loanwords from Arabic, Persian, French and other languages.

This article is a companion to Turkish grammar and contains some information that might be considered grammatical. The purpose of this article is mainly to show the use of some of the yapım ekleri "structural suffixes" of the Turkish language, as well as to give some of the structurally important words, like pronouns, determiners, postpositions, and conjunctions.

== Origins ==
Origins of the Turkish vocabulary
1. Turkic languages (86.6%)
2. Arabic (5.81%)
3. French (4.73%)
4. Persian (1.22%)
5. Italian (0.57%)
6. English (0.43%)
7. Greek (0.36%)
8. Latin (0.13%)
9. Other (0.16%)

Around 86% of the Turkish vocabulary is of Turkic origin. Most of the core vocabulary and the most commonly used words in Turkish, including those first acquired by children as they learn to speak, come from Turkic. Meanwhile, around 14% of Turkish words are of foreign origin, in particular Arabic, French, and Persian. According to the Turkish Language Association, 6,463 of these foreign words come from Arabic, 4,974 from French, 1,374 from Persian, 632 from Italian, 538 from English, 399 from Greek, and 147 from Latin.

The most significant linguistic influence in the Turkish language started with the Turks' conversion to Islam in the 10th century. The borrowing of Arabic and Persian words began during the Seljuk Empire, in which the long language contact between the Seljuk Turks and Persians in Iran (Persia) led to Persianization and the adoption of the Persian language for official and literary use. As a result, educated Turks had access to the vocabularies of three languages: Oghuz Turkic as their native language as well as for dynastic and military purposes, Persian for cultural, artistic, literary, courtly and scholarly purposes, and Arabic for theological, juridical, scientific and religious purposes.

Borrowing from Arabic and Persian continued during the Ottoman Empire, alongside a new increased influence from French, Italian, English and other European languages due to trade, diplomacy and modernization efforts particularly in the 18th century, and the official language of the Ottoman Turks became Ottoman Turkish (Osmanlıca). Nevertheless, Ottoman Turkish differed significantly from the everyday language spoken by the general population and was largely unintelligible to ordinary people. The everyday Turkish, known as kaba Türkçe ("vulgar Turkish"), was spoken by the less-educated and rural communities, and retained a much higher percentage of native Turkish vocabulary, which later served as the foundation for the modern Turkish language.

With the advent of the Turkish Republic in 1923 came the attempt to unify the languages of the people and the administration, and to westernize the country. The modern Turkish alphabet, based on the Latin script, was introduced. Language reform efforts led by Mustafa Kemal Atatürk were also introduced in an aim to remove foreign loanwords in Turkish and restore a more Turkic-based vocabulary, where the majority of Arabic and Persian words were replaced by: Turkish words surviving in speech, obsolete Turkish words, new words formed regularly from the agglutinative structure of Turkish, and entirely new words or formations. As a result, many foreign words had Turkish equivalents. Some foreign words became outdated and fell out of use during the republican period, while others remained in daily conversation. For example, the Turkish word güney became the standard term for "south", replacing the Arabic loanword cenup, but in some cases the foreign word remained dominant - such as dünya (Arabic) being more commonly used for "world" than the Turkish equivalent yeryüzü. In other instances, both words remained in use, like isim (Arabic) and ad (Turkish) for "name", which are often used interchangeably.

== Nouns ==
Turkish nouns and pronouns have no grammatical gender (the same pronoun o means "he", "she" or "it"), but have six grammatical cases: nominative or absolute (used for the subject or an indefinite direct object), accusative (used for a definite direct object), dative (= to), locative (= in), ablative (= from), genitive (= of). There are two grammatical numbers, singular and plural.

=== Nouns from nouns and adjectives ===
The suffix -ci attached to a noun denotes a person involved with what is named by the noun:

Noun	Noun + -ci
iş "work"	işçi "worker"
balık "fish"	balıkçı "fisherman"
gazete "newspaper"	gazeteci "newsagent", "journalist"

The suffix -lik attached to a noun or adjective denotes an abstraction, or an object involved with what is named by the noun:

Noun	Noun + -lik
iyi "good"	iyilik "goodness"
tuz "salt"	tuzluk "salt shaker"
gün "day"	günlük "diary", "daily" (adverb)
gece "night"	gecelik "nightgown"

=== Nouns from verbs ===
The noun in -im denoting an instance of action was mentioned in the introduction to Turkish grammar.

yat- "lie down",
yatır- "lay down",
yatırım "investment".

For more examples on word derivations, see the related article: List of replaced loanwords in Turkish.

== Adjectives ==
=== Classification of adjectives ===
Adjectives can be distinguished as being

- descriptive (niteleme "qualifying"), or
- determinative (belirtme): in particular:
  - demonstrative (gösterme "to show" or işaret "sign"),
  - numerical (sayı "number"),
  - indefinite (belirsizlik or belgisiz),
  - interrogative (soru "question").

For an intensive form, the first consonant and vowel of a (descriptive) adjective can be reduplicated; a new consonant is added too, m, p, r, or s, but there is no simple rule for which one:

Adjective	Intensive Form
başka "other"	bambaşka "completely different"
katı "hard"	kaskatı "hard as a rock"
kuru "dry"	kupkuru "dry as a bone"
temiz "clean"	tertemiz "clean as a whistle"

The determinative adjectives, or determiners, are an essential part of the language, although Turkish takes some of its determiners from Arabic and Persian.

==== Demonstrative adjectives ====
- o "that",
- bu "this",
- şu "this" or "that" (thing pointed to).

These are also demonstrative pronouns. Used with plural nouns, these adjectives represent the English "those" and "these"; there is no such inflexion of adjectives in Turkish.

==== Numerical adjectives ====
The cardinal numbers are built up in a regular way from the following:

0-9	0	1	2	3	4	5	6	7	8	9
0-9	sıfır	bir	iki	üç	dört	beş	altı	yedi	sekiz	dokuz
Multiples of Ten	—	10	20	30	40	50	60	70	80	90
Multiples of Ten	—	on	yirmi	otuz	kırk	elli	altmış	yetmiş	seksen	doksan

Powers of Ten	10	100	1,000	1,000,000	1,000,000,000
Powers of Ten	on	yüz	bin	milyon	milyar

Units follow multiples of ten; powers of ten come in descending order. For example:

yüz kırk dokuz milyar beş yüz doksan yedi milyon sekiz yüz yetmiş bin altı yüz doksan bir metre ("149,597,870,691 metres").

yüz	kırk	dokuz	milyar
[one] hundred	forty	nine	billion

beş	yüz	doksan	yedi	milyon
five	hundred	ninety	seven	million

sekiz	yüz	yetmiş	bin
eight	hundred	seventy	thousand

altı	yüz	doksan	bir	metre
six	hundred	ninety	one	metres

The cardinals are generally not used alone, but a general word for a unit is used, such as:

- tane, literally "grain";
- kişi "person".

Remembering that the plural suffix is not used when numbers are named, we have:

dört tane bira "four beers";
Altı kişiyiz "We are six."

From the cardinal numbers, others can be derived with suffixes:

- ordinal -(i)nci
  yedi "seven" → yedinci "seventh"
  Sırada yedincisiniz.
  "You are seventh in line."
- distributive -(ş)er
  bir "one" → birer "one each"
  iki "two" → ikişer "two each"
- collective -(i)z
  iki "two" → ikizler "twins"

==== Indefinite adjectives ====
The cardinal bir "one" can be used as an indefinite article. Other so-called indefinite adjectives might be listed as follows:

- universal: her "each, every", tüm "the whole", bütün "whole, all";
- existential: bazı "some", biraz "a little", birkaç "a few, several";
- negative: hiç "none";
- quantitative: az "little, few", çok "much, many";
- distinguishing: başka, diğer, öteki, öbür "other";
- identifying: aynı "same".

==== Interrogative adjectives ====
- hangi "which?"
- kaç "how much?" or "how many?"
  Saat kaç? "What time is it?"
  Kaç saat? "How many hours?"
- nasıl "what sort?" (this is also the interrogative adverb "how?")

=== Adjectives from nouns ===
Added to a noun, -li or -siz indicates presence or absence, respectively, of what is named by the noun.

Noun	Presence (-li)	Absence (-siz)
tuz "salt"	tuzlu "salted"	tuzsuz "salt-free"
umut "hope"	umutlu "hopeful"	umutsuz "hopeless"

The suffix -li also indicates origin:

Ankaralıyım. "I am from Ankara."

Finally, added to the verbal noun in -me, the suffix -li creates the necessitative verb.

Pattern: (verb-stem) + me + li + (personal ending).

Gitmeliyim. "I must go".

The native speaker may perceive -meli as an indivisible suffix denoting compulsion.

Added to a noun for a person, -ce makes an adjective.

Noun	Adjective (Noun + -ce)
çocuk "child"	çocukça "childish"
kahraman "hero"	kahramanca "heroic"

== Adverbs ==
Adjectives can generally serve as adverbs:

iyi "good" or "well"

The adjective might then be repeated, as noted earlier. A repeated noun also serves as an adverb:

kapı "door" → kapı kapı "door-to-door"

The suffix -ce makes nouns and adjectives into adverbs. One source (Özkırımlı, p. 155) calls it the benzerlik ("similarity") or görelik (from göre "according to") eki, considering it as another case-ending.

- Attached to adjectives, -ce is like the English -ly:
  güzelce "beautifully"
- Attached to nouns, -ce can be like the English like:
  Türkçe konuş- "speak like Turks" (i.e., "speak Turkish")

Adverbs of place include:

- aşağı/yukarı "down/up"
- geri/ileri "backwards/forwards"
- dışarı/içeri "outside/inside"
- beri/öte "hither/yon"
- karşı "opposite"

These can also be treated as adjectives and nouns (in particular, they can be given case-endings). Also, the suffix -re can be added to the demonstrative pronouns o, bu, and şu, as well as to the interrogative pronoun ne, treated as a noun. The result has cases serving as adverbs of place:

- nereye/buraya/oraya "whither?/hither/thither"
- nerede/burada/orada "where?/here/there"
- nereden/buradan/oradan "whence?/hence/thence"

== Postpositions ==
=== With genitive and absolute ===
The following are used after the genitive pronouns benim, bizim, senin, sizin, onun, and kimin, and after the absolute case of other pronouns and nouns:

- gibi "like, as";
- için "for";
- ile "with";
- kadar (Arabic) "as much as".

For example, a certain company may describe its soft drink as:

buz	gibi
ice	like
"like ice", "ice cold"

However, another company may say of itself:

Gibisi	yok.
its-like	non-existent
"There's nothing like it."

Thus the label of postposition does not adequately describe gibi; Schaaik proposes calling it a predicate, because of its use in establishing similarity:

Eşek	gibisin.
donkey	you-are-like
"You are like a donkey."

beni	küçümseyecekmiş	gibi	bir	duygu
me-ACC	s/he-will-look-down-on	like	a	feeling
"a feeling as if s/he will look down on me"

The particle ile can be both comitative and instrumental; it can also join the preceding word as a suffix. Examples:

- Deniz ile konuştuk or Deniz'le konuştuk
  "Deniz and I [or we], we spoke."
  (here the literal translation "We spoke with Deniz" may be incorrect)
- çekiç ile vur- or çekiçle vur-
  "hit with a hammer"

=== With dative ===
Used after nouns and pronouns in the dative case are:

- doğru "towards";
- göre "according to";
- kadar "as far as";
- karşı "against".

=== With ablative ===
- önce/sonra "before/after";
- beri "since";
- itibaren (Arabic) "from…on";
- dolayı "because of".

=== With absolute ===
The following postpositions are case-forms of nouns with the third-person possessional suffix; they can be understood as forming nominal compounds, always indefinite, with the preceding words (see also Turkish grammar#Nouns):

- bakımdan "from the point of view of" (bak- "look");
- hakkında "concerning, about" (hak "right, justice");
- tarafından "by the agency of" (taraf "side");
- yüzünden "because of" (yüz "face").

== Interjections ==
Some samples include:

- secular:
  - Öf [disgust];
  - Haydi "Come on": Haydi kızlar okula "Girls to school!" (slogan for an education campaign);
- invoking the Deity:
  - implicitly:
    - Aman "Mercy";
    - Çok şükür "Much thanks";
  - explicitly:
    - Allah Allah "Goodness gracious";
    - Hay Allah;
    - Vallah "By God [I swear it]".

== Conjunctions ==
Some Turkish conjunctions are borrowed from Persian and Arabic.

=== Logical conjunction ===
The cumulative sense of the English "A and B" can be expressed several ways:

- A ve B (an Arabic borrowing);
- B ile A (ile is also a postposition);
- A, B de.

For the adversative sense of "but" or "only", there are ama and fakat (both Arabic), also yalnız (which is also an adjective corresponding to "alone").

For emphasis: hem A hem B "both A and B".

=== Logical disjunction ===
For the sense of English "(either)…or":

- A veya B;
- ya A veya B;
- ya A ya da B.

The pattern of the last two can be extended:

- ya A ya B veya C;
- ya A ya B ya da C.

=== Implication ===
- B, çünkü A "B, because A".
- ((Eğer)) A'ysa, (o zaman) B'dir. "If A, then B." ("Eğer" is not generally used.)

Both çünkü and eğer are Persian; the latter is not generally needed, because the conditional form of the verb is available.

=== The conjunction ki ===
The Persian conjunction ki brings to Turkish the Indo-European style of relating ideas (#Lewis [XIII,15]):

Beklemesini istiyorum "Her-waiting I-desire"; but
İstiyorum ki beklesin "I-desire that he-wait."

Thus ki corresponds roughly to English "that", but with a broader sense:

Güneş batmıştı ki köye vardık "The-sun had-set [when] that at-the-village we-arrived."
Kirazı yedim ki şeker gibi "The-cherry I-ate [and found] that [it was] sugar like."

== Verbs ==
The verb-stem temizle- "make clean" is the adjective temiz "clean" with the suffix -le-. Many verbs are formed from nouns or adjectives with -le:

- başla- "make a head", that is, "begin" (intransitive; baş "head");
- kilitle- "make locked", that is, "lock" (kilit "lock");
- kirlet- "make dirty" (kir "dirt")
- köpekle- (from köpek "dog", discussed at Turkish grammar#Parts of speech).

The suffix -iş- indicates reciprocal action, which is expressed in English by "each other" or "one another".

- görüşmek "to see one another" (from görmek "to see", for example Görüşürüz, "Goodbye"

(literally "We see one another"))

(But there are exceptions: sevişmek does not mean "to love one another" (from sevmek "to love") but rather "to make love with each other."

Many causative verbs are formed with -dir-.

- öldürmek "to kill" (from ölmek "to die")
- yaptırmak "to have something done" (from yapmak "to do")
