= Verbal agreement =

Verbal agreement may refer to:

- Oral contract or verbal contract, a contract the terms of which have been agreed by spoken communication
- Verbal agreement or concord, grammatical agreement of a verb form with its subject or objects; see Grammatical conjugation#Verbal agreement

== See also ==
- Verbal (disambiguation)
