= Law of the Netherlands =

The Netherlands uses civil law. The role of case law is small in theory, although, in practice, it is impossible to understand the law in many fields without considering the relevant case law. The Dutch law system is based on the French Civil Code with some influence from Roman-Dutch law (which it replaced) and pre-codal customary law. The German Bürgerliches Gesetzbuch heavily influenced the new Civil Code (which went into force in 1992).

The primary law-making body is formed by the Dutch parliament in cooperation with the government, operating jointly to create laws that are commonly referred to as the legislature (Dutch: wetgever). The power to make new laws can be delegated to lower governments or specific organs of the State, but only for a prescribed purpose. A trend in recent years has been for parliament and the government to create "framework laws" and delegate the creation of detailed rules to ministers or lower governments (e.g., a province or municipality).

The Ministry of Justice and Security is the primary institution of Dutch law.

== Areas of law ==
The domain of Dutch law is commonly divided into the following areas:

- Administrative law
- Civil law (including family law, inheritance law, contract law, and commercial law)
- Criminal law
- Constitutional law (including laws on the structure of the state)
- European law
- International law

=== Civil law ===
Civil law is the domain of law that regulates the everyday life of persons and other legal entities (such as corporations). The main code of Dutch civil law is the Burgerlijk Wetboek.

=== Criminal law ===
Criminal law deals with the prosecution and punishment of criminal offenses. The main code is the Wetboek van Strafrecht (nl).

The minimum age of criminal responsibility in the Netherlands is 12 years old. The Criminal Code sets out four justification defences: necessity (noodtoestand), self-defense (noodweer), following a public duty or official order (wettelijk voorschrift en ambtelijk bevel), and absence of substantive unlawfulness (afwezigheid van materiële wederrechtelijkheid). There are also five excuse defences: insanity (ontoerekenbaarheid), duress (overmacht), excessive self-defence (noodweerexces), obeying of an unlawful order (onbevoegd gegeven ambtelijk bevel), and absence of all blameworthiness (afwezigheid van alle schuld).

=== Constitutional law ===
Constitutional law involves itself with the constitution and the structure of the Netherlands. It involves the powers of democratic institutions, the organization of elections, and the divisions of powers between central and local governments. See also the article on the Constitution of the Netherlands. Following the practice of many civil law jurisdictions, and in contrast, to practice in nations such as the United States, the practice of Dutch constitutional law is that judges are not allowed to determine the constitutionality of laws created by the legislature (the government and parliament acting jointly).

=== Administrative law ===
Administrative law is the area of law that regulates the operation of the various levels of government and how persons and legal entities can appeal government decisions. The basics of Dutch administrative law were entirely overhauled in 1994 with the advent of the new Basic Administrative Law (Dutch: Algemene wet bestuursrecht).

=== European law ===
European law deals with the influence of laws and regulations of the European Union on the laws of the Netherlands.

== See also ==
- Supreme Court of the Netherlands
- Roman-Dutch Law
- Defamation (Dutch criminal law)
