= Abus =

Abus may refer to:

- Abuş, a village in Mica Commune, Mureș County, Romania
- ABUS, a German maker of locks and padlocks
- ABUS Crane Systems, a German manufacturer of crane systems and hoists
- Abus (bus operator), a public transport company in Bristol, England
- Abus (river), an old name for the Humber Estuary in England
- Abus gun, an early form of howitzer created by the Ottoman Empire
- Abus Valley, Antarctica
- Arbutus Biopharma, American biopharmaceutical company (NASDAQ stock symbol ABUS)
- Mount Ararat, Abus in ancient authors

== See also ==
- Abuse (disambiguation)
