= Abusive language (law) =

Illegal language in small number of US states

The use of abusive language to another person is illegal in a small number of U.S. states. Offenders are typically charged with this offense in conjunction with other crimes, such as aggressive driving or assault. In 1989 the New York State Court of Appeals ruled that abusive language was protected under the First Amendment to the United States Constitution.
