= Anti-Defamation League (disambiguation) =

The Anti-Defamation League is an international Jewish organization based in the US.

Anti-Defamation League may also refer to:

- American Italian Anti-Defamation League
- National Mexican-American Anti-Defamation Committee
