= Punjab Defamation Act 2024 =

Provincial Assembly of the Punjab
- Long title: An Act to make provisions in respect of defamation.
- Citation: Act II of 2024
- Enacted by: Provincial Assembly of the Punjab
- Assented to: 7 June 2024

Legislative history
- Bill title: The Punjab Defamation Bill 2024
- Introduced by: Mian Mujtaba Shuja-ur-Rehman, Minister of Parliamentary Affairs
- Introduced: 20 May 2024
- Status: In force

The Punjab Defamation Act 2024 is a controversial piece of legislation passed by the Punjab Assembly in Pakistan. The bill aims to curb the spread of fake news on print, electronic and social media platforms. Despite its stated objective, the bill has faced significant opposition from journalists, human rights organizations and opposition lawmakers.

== Passage ==
This bill was approved by the Punjab Assembly on 20 May 2024. All the amendments suggested by the opposition were rejected, which was followed by heated debates, protests and tearing of copies of the bill in the assembly. The bill was presented by Punjab Parliamentary Affairs Minister Mian Mujtaba Shuja-ur-Rehman.

== Provisions ==
The bill addresses the issue of misinformation on platforms like YouTube, TikTok, Twitter, Facebook and Instagram. It allows defamation suits to be filed against those who spread false information. The bill includes provisions for fines of up to Rs 30 lakh and sets up special tribunals to hear defamation cases, which are ordered to be disposed of within six months. It has been clarified that the High Court will hear the charges against the persons holding constitutional positions.

== Controversies and criticism ==
The bill has been criticized for being passed in haste without proper consultation with journalists and media organizations. Journalists have announced a nationwide protest against the bill, calling it a 'black law'. The Human Rights Commission of Pakistan (HRCP) has expressed serious concern over the bill, saying it proposes a parallel structure for adjudicating defamation claims.

== Legal challenges ==
The Punjab Defamation Act 2024 has been challenged in the Lahore High Court. The petitioners claim that the new defamation law contradicts the existing legal framework and was hastily enacted without proper consultation with journalists and media organizations.

== Protests ==
The defamation bill is facing significant opposition and protests from various quarters nationwide.

=== Journalists and media organizations ===
Journalists and media organizations have been at the forefront of the protest. Pakistan Federal Union of Journalists (PFUJ) staged protests outside press clubs in Karachi, Lahore, Islamabad, Rawalpindi, Quetta, Hyderabad, Abbottabad and other cities and hoisted black flags. They termed this bill as an attack on freedom of press.

=== Opposition parties ===
Opposition parties have also protested against the bill. The Pakistan Tehreek-e-Insaf (PTI) announced its intention to challenge the bill in court, even threatening journalists to join its protest. PTI leader Malik Ahmad Khan Bhachar criticized the bill, saying that his party would invite journalists to consider the matter and take the matter to court.

=== Civil society ===
More than 80 civil society organizations registered their protest against the legislation. He rejected the defamation bill outright as it is a grave violation of the fundamental rights of freedom of speech and freedom of the press.

=== Human Rights Commission of Pakistan (HRCP) ===
The Human Rights Commission of Pakistan (HRCP) has expressed serious concern over the bill, saying it proposes a parallel structure for adjudicating defamation claims.
