= Slander (disambiguation) =

Slander is a false or malicious claim that may harm someone's reputation.

Slander may also refer to:

- Slander of title, a species of malicious falsehood relating to real estate
- Slander (1916 film), a lost silent film
- Slander (1957 film), a film noir starring Van Johnson
- Slander: Liberal Lies About the American Right, a 2002 book by Ann Coulter
- Slander (album), a 2011 album by Dr. Acula
- Slander (DJs), a DJ duo from Los Angeles
- Slander, an alternate title for the Calumny of Apelles, a painting by Sandro Botticelli, c. 1494–1495
- "Slander", a song by Survivor from the album Caught in the Game

== See also ==
- For the discouraged action of editing Wikipedia articles to maliciously portray people negatively, see Wikipedia:Slander.
