= Anacoluthon =

Unexpected change in the syntactical structure of the sentence

An anacoluthon (/ænəkəˈljuːθɒn/; from the Greek anakolouthon, from an- 'not', and akólouthos 'following') is an unexpected discontinuity in the expression of ideas within a sentence, leading to a form of words in which there is logical or grammatical incoherence of thought. Anacolutha are often sentences interrupted midway, where there is a change in the syntactical structure of the sentence and of intended meaning following the interruption. As rhetorical or literary device, anacoluthon may be used to demonstrate emotion or the natural patterns of spoken discourse.

When anacoluthon occurs unintentionally, it is considered to be an error in sentence structure and may result in incoherent nonsense. However, it can be used intentionally as a rhetorical technique to challenge the reader to think more deeply, or in stream-of-consciousness literature to represent the disjointed nature of associative thought.

Anacolutha are very common in informal speech, where a speaker might start to say one thing, then break off and abruptly and incoherently continue, expressing a completely different line of thought. When such speech is reported in writing, an em dash (—) or ellipsis (...) is often included at the point of discontinuity. The listener is expected to ignore the first part of the sentence, although in some cases it might contribute to the overall meaning in an impressionistic sense.

== Examples ==
Had ye been there – for what could that have done?

— John Milton, Lycidas

In Paradise Lost, John Milton uses an anacoluthon with Satan's first words to illustrate his initial confusion:

If thou beest he; but O how fallen! How changed"

— I.83

Additionally, Conrad Aiken's Rimbaud and Verlaine has an extended anacoluthon as it discusses anacoluthon:

Discussing, between moves, iamb and spondee
Anacoluthon and the open vowel
God the great peacock with his angel peacocks
And his dependent peacocks the bright stars ...

== Etymology ==
The word anacoluthon is a transliteration of the Greek ἀνακόλουθον (anakólouthon), which derives from the privative prefix ἀν- an- 'not', and the root adjective ἀκόλουθος akólouthos 'following'. This, incidentally, is precisely the meaning of the Latin phrase non sequitur in logic. However, in classical rhetoric, anacoluthon was used both for the logical error of non sequitur and for the syntactic effect or error of changing an expected following or completion to a new or improper one.

== Use of the term ==
The term anacoluthon is used primarily within an academic context. It is most likely to appear in a study of rhetoric or poetry. For example, the 3rd edition of The King's English, a style guide written by H. W. Fowler and F. G. Fowler, mentions it as a major grammatical mistake:

We can hardly conclude even so desultory a survey of grammatical misdemeanours as this has been without mentioning the most notorious of all. The anacoluthon is a failure to follow on, an unconscious departure from the grammatical scheme with which a sentence was started, the getting switched off, imperceptibly to the writer, very noticeably to his readers, from one syntax track to another.

The word, though not the underlying meaning, has been somewhat popularized due to its use as an expletive by Captain Haddock in the English translations of The Adventures of Tintin series of children's books.

The poet and critic Rachel Blau DuPlessis defines anacoluthon as "the grammatical switching of horses in midstream of a sentence: beginning a sentence in one grammar and ending it in another". She argues that it involves "the employing of multiple discursive ranges and disjunctive transpositions from one to the other[,] hence in any one poem, far from being in one mode, one register, one stable voice, a writer is like an acrobat ... a Barthesean weaver of a wacky fabric, or someone who 'samples', like a certain kind of contemporary DJ".

== See also ==
- English as She Is Spoke
- Figure of speech
- Non sequitur (literary device)
- Dangling modifier
