= Defamer =

Defamer may refer to:

- One who defames
- Defamer.com
