= Defamation (Dutch criminal law) =

Dutch criminal law

Defamation (Dutch: Smaad) in Dutch criminal law is a form of insult where someone's honor or good name is attacked through a concrete accusation, made with the aim of publicizing it. When defamation is committed by means of a document, illustration or audio recording, it is called libel (smaadschrift).

Defamation and libel belong to expression offenses and have been punishable as crimes in Netherlands since the introduction of the Dutch Criminal Code in 1886. Since then, the provisions on defamation and libel have not been fundamentally changed by the legislator. They have only been adapted to technological and social developments.

Defamation differs from other forms of insult by the requirement of a concrete accusation and the aim of publicizing it. The accusation does not have to be untrue; an accusation relating to a true act can also be defamatory. However, someone who in good faith could assume that the accusation was based on truth and also served the public interest is not punishable. The same applies to someone who acted in necessary self-defense. Under certain circumstances, freedom of expression can also preclude a conviction for defamation.

Slander (Dutch: laster) is a qualified form of defamation in Dutch criminal law. Slander occurs when all elements of defamation are met and the perpetrator also knows that the accusation is untrue.

== History ==
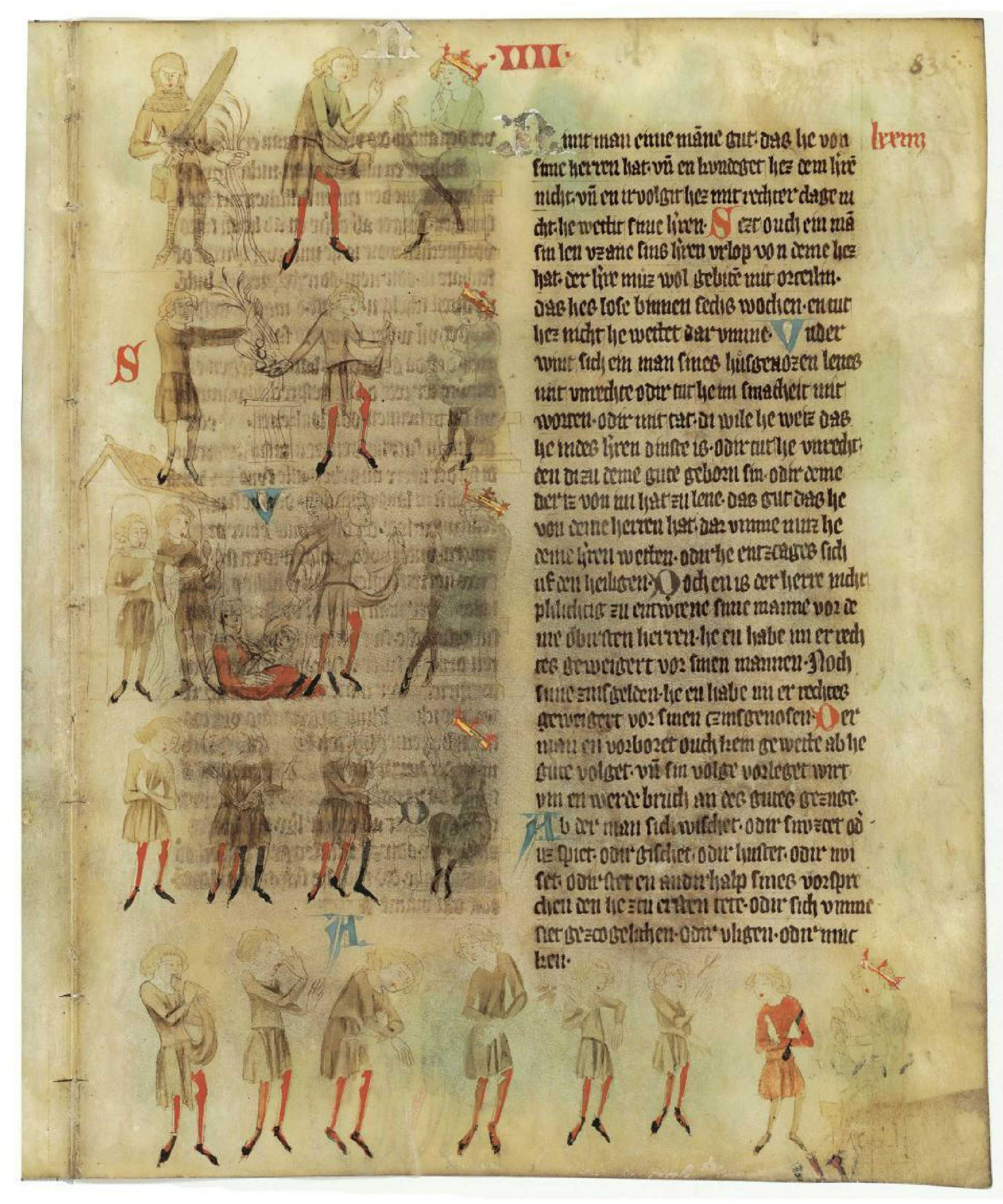
Folio 83r from the Dresden Sachsenspiegel contains an early passage referring to smatheit (defamation). Circa 1350 AD.

The word smaad (defamation) is derived from the Middle Dutch word smade, meaning 'attack on someone's dignity'. It is further related to the Old High German smahen which means 'to humiliate, belittle, despise'. In this sense of 'intentionally offending', the word was also used in legal texts. Around 1300, the Sachsenspiegel referred, for example, to 'smatheit mit worten oder mit tat'. (Note: Loose translation: defamation committed by words or deeds.)

In the 17th century, Hugo Grotius made a dogmatic distinction between insult by words, which he called 'lasteringh' (slander), and insult by deeds (the 'hoon' - scorn). With an incorrect reference to the Sachsenspiegel, he equated 'smaet' (defamation) with verbal insult by 'lasteringh'. Following the theories of legal scholars such as Hugo Grotius, various forms of insult were gradually distinguished from each other. In German, and to a lesser extent Dutch, legal practice, simple insult by means of insults began to be distinguished from offensive slanders. However, the word smaad was still used in legal practice in the general sense of 'humiliation and offensive expression', such as in an Utrecht ordinance that prohibited 'smedelijke rimen ende andere scrifte'. (Note: Loose translation: defamatory rhymes and other writings.)

In that sense, the Criminal Code for the Kingdom of Holland of 1809 (the first Dutch criminal code) also used the term. This Code contained a provision that, among other things, punished 'smadelijke bedrijven' (defamatory acts) against another as scorn. (Note: Art. 164 CW: "He who, by striking, threatening or other defamatory acts, committed on or about a person's person, dwelling or place where he is, or also by contemptuous displays, or by making and disseminating drawings or prints, or in any other similar way, intentionally scorns, provokes, ridicules, seeks to make hateful or contemptible, shall be punished according to the circumstances [...]") The Criminal Code was only valid for two years. In 1810, the Kingdom of Holland was incorporated into the First French Empire, after which the Code was replaced in 1811 by the Code pénal. The Code contained a section with the heading 'slander, defamatory words or defamatory statements, breach of secrecy'. It criminalized the utterance and dissemination of 'smaad- of scheldwoorden' (in French injures) that did not contain an accusation of a specific fact but merely contained a specific vice. (Note: Art. 375 CP: "As for defamatory or abusive words, and offensive expressions, which contain no accusation of a specific and defined act but of an indicated vice, in case they are uttered in or at public places or gatherings, or are placed in printed or unprinted writings that have been disseminated and circulated, the penalty shall consist of a fine of sixteen to five hundred francs.") In addition, all other 'smaadwoorden of beleedigende uitdrukkingen' (injures ou expressions outrageantes) were criminalized as offenses. (Note: Art. 376 CP: "All other defamatory words or offensive expressions, where this double quality of seriousness and publicity does not apply, shall only give rise to simple police penalties.) In both the Criminal Code and the Code pénal, however, there was no specific offense of defamation and the word was used in the everyday sense of 'humiliating, belittling, and insulting'.

== Draft Criminal Code ==
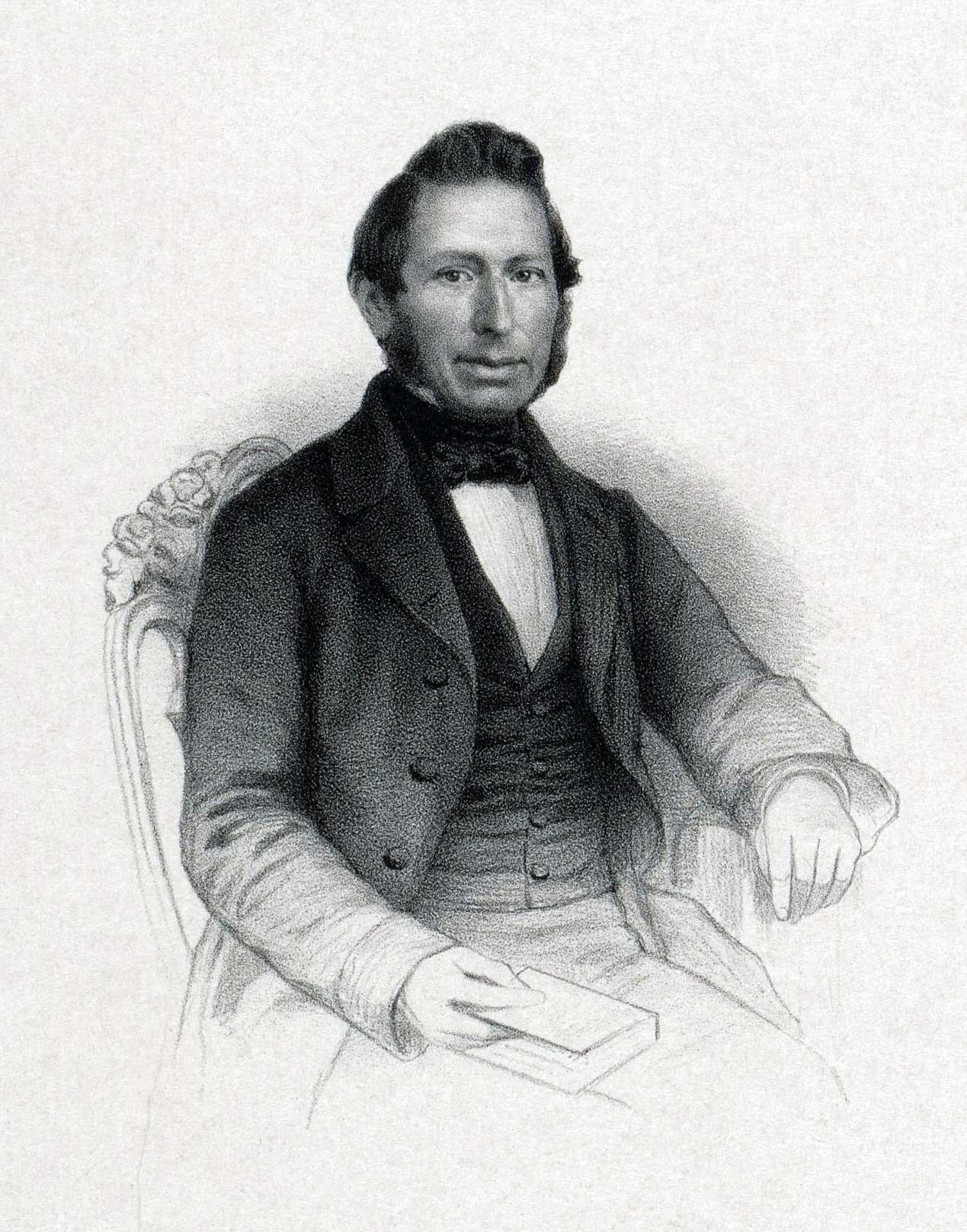
Johan de Wal (1816-1892) was chairman of the State Commission tasked with drafting a new criminal code.

On September 28, 1870, by royal decree no. 21, a state commission was established for the drafting of a new Criminal Code. For the provisions on insult, the Commission wanted to break with the previous system of the Code pénal. Chairman De Wal proposed to take the Italian draft criminal code of 1870 as an example. The Italian draft distinguished three types of punishable insult. First, publicized and disseminated defamatory writings (libello famoso). In addition, defamation (diffamazione) by communicating the insult to several persons. Finally, simple insult (ingiuria) that did not meet the requirements of libel and defamation. The preliminary draft still translated diffamazione as honor theft. De Pinto proposed to change this name, because it concerned a crime that was much lighter than slander, which was not apparent from the word honor theft. According to De Pinto, the word 'smaad' (defamation) fitted much better here, also because of the close connection between honor theft and libel. The Commission shared these concerns and adopted the name defamation.

The State Commission submitted its report to the King on May 13, 1875, after which the government made some changes to the draft. On February 22, 1879, the Original Government Draft (O.R.O.) for a Criminal Code was sent to the House of Representatives. Now that the Italian draft criminal code had been taken as a starting point, the regulation of punishable insult in the O.R.O. differed significantly from the Code pénal. According to the government, this change was necessary because the old system was no longer followed in legal science and legal practice. Moreover, the insult provisions from the Code pénal, and especially slander, had still not penetrated the 'public consciousness'. One of the changes was the number of independent insult offenses. The Code pénal distinguished three different forms of insult, namely slander, scorn, and insults. The new criminal code only had two main forms. Following the Italian draft, a distinction was made between defamation/libel and simple insult. Simple insult was a residual category for insults that did not possess the characteristics of defamation or libel. Slander disappeared as an independent offense and became a qualified form of defamation. (Note: This is called a qualified offense. This is a criminal offense in which, compared to the basic offense, additional elements have been added, so that the qualified offense is threatened with a heavier penalty.)

In his dissertation on punishable insult, Janssens argues that the draft provision on defamation also shows similarities with the offense of diffamation introduced in France in 1819. (Note: The French text of art. 13(1) loi du 17 mai 1819 reads: "toute allégation ou imputation d'un fait qui porte atteinte à l'honneur ou à la considération de la personne ou du corps auquel le fait est imputé est une diffamation.") Among other things, the term 'honor or good name' is said to have originated from this French law. (Note: Janssens attributes this assertion to David Simons, who is said to have used it in his dissertation De vrijheid van drukpers in verband met het Wetboek van Strafrecht ('s-Gravenhage: Belinfante 1883).) In addition to similarities, however, there are also clear differences. The French law of 1819 made it possible to insult a collectivity (e.g., a legal person or an administrative body). The Dutch draft provision, on the other hand, only recognized individuals as victims of insult. The offenses of defamation and libel were placed in a separate title with the heading insult. The text in the O.R.O. read:

TITLE XVI.
Insult.
Art. 279. He who, with the intention to insult, charges someone, under whatever guise, either in the presence of two or more persons, or by successive communication to two or more persons separately, with a specific fact by which his honor or good name is attacked, shall be punished as guilty of defamation with imprisonment not exceeding six months or a fine not exceeding three hundred guilders.
Among the two or more persons referred to in the first paragraph, the perpetrator's housemates are not included.
Art. 280. He who, with the intention to insult, charges someone, under whatever guise, by means of writings or images, disseminated, publicly displayed or posted, with a specific fact by which his honor or good name is attacked, shall be punished as guilty of libel with imprisonment not exceeding one year or a fine not exceeding three hundred guilders.

=== Treatment of the O.R.O. in the House of Representatives ===
The Committee of Rapporteurs of the House of Representatives could not fully agree with the draft provision of Article 279 O.R.O. (Note: The Committee of Rapporteurs had to comment on the bill on behalf of the House of Representatives. This comment was written in the form of a report to the government; the government then responded with an answer to the report.) They agreed with the government that the old system of slander in the Code pénal was not effective, but they could also not agree with the new system. The biggest problem with the old slander provision was that it only concerned public communications, while the most punishable slander was often committed secretly and thus escaped punishment. The Committee found the new defamation provision unclear and arbitrarily defined, thus missing its objective. They considered it inconsistent, among other things, that the communication of an accusation to one person was insufficient to constitute defamation, but communication to two persons with an interval of several years was. After all, communication to two persons can remain without consequences for the offended, while disclosure to one person can have major consequences for the defamed person. The Committee also found that the draft exceeded its purpose by allowing criminal prosecution when the defamation remained within a limited circle.

To address these concerns, it proposed to focus on the defamer's purpose – to make the accusation widely known. The provision was added to the draft that the defamation was committed "in public or with the obvious aim of bringing it to the public's attention" or "to publicize it". A minority could not agree with the words 'in public', because it would place too much emphasis on the place where the defamation was committed. Moreover, in their opinion, the addition was superfluous because it was already implied in the purpose of bringing the defamation to the public's attention (or publicizing it). Finally, it was proposed to delete the phrase 'under whatever guise' in the draft text, as it added nothing. The Committee also believed that the exclusion of housemates in the second paragraph of Article 279 O.R.O. should preferably be deleted. The exclusion had been added to the State Commission's draft by the government. The explanation in the explanatory memorandum was brief: the government believed that freedom of speech towards housemates should be fully respected by exempting conversations within the household from criminal prosecution for defamation. However, the addition was short-lived. In the government's response to the report, the minister agreed without much ado to the proposed editorial changes.

During the parliamentary debate in the House of Representatives, there was also some ambiguity about the intent required. According to the explanatory memorandum, there was no insult if the perpetrator had no intent to insult. But according to the same explanatory memorandum, the main requirement of insult was also the intention to offend someone's sense of honor (the so-called animus injuriandi). (Note: In a criminal law sense, intent refers to a specific intent requirement. It is assumed that conditional intent is not sufficient to establish intent. Unlike normal intent, specific intent only relates to one or a few specific elements.) The drafting in the O.R.O. reflected this, by requiring "the intent to insult" for defamation. However, the Committee of Rapporteurs interpreted this intent as a motive of the perpetrator – namely, what the perpetrator wanted to achieve with the insult – and could not agree with that. In the government's response, the minister concluded that they essentially agreed on the required animus injuriandi and then independently opted for a new wording in which the intent to insult was removed.

In addition to these changes, the offense of libel (in Article 280 O.R.O.) was merged with the defamation provision at the suggestion of the Committee. Also, following the discussions in parliament, a third paragraph was added that limited the scope of the provision if defamation was committed in the public interest or in necessary self-defense. All these changes were incorporated into the Amended Draft. Moreover, the article number was changed to Article 261. The wording of the defamation provision, as it was finally adopted in 1881, read:

TITLE XVI.
Insult.
261. He who intentionally attacks someone's honor or good name, by charging a specific fact, with the obvious aim of publicizing it, shall be punished as guilty of defamation with imprisonment not exceeding six months or a fine not exceeding three hundred guilders.
If this occurs by means of writings or images, disseminated, publicly displayed or posted, the perpetrator shall be punished as guilty of libel with imprisonment not exceeding one year or a fine not exceeding three hundred guilders.
Neither defamation nor libel exists insofar as the perpetrator has demonstrably acted in the public interest or in necessary self-defense.

=== Development after 1886 ===
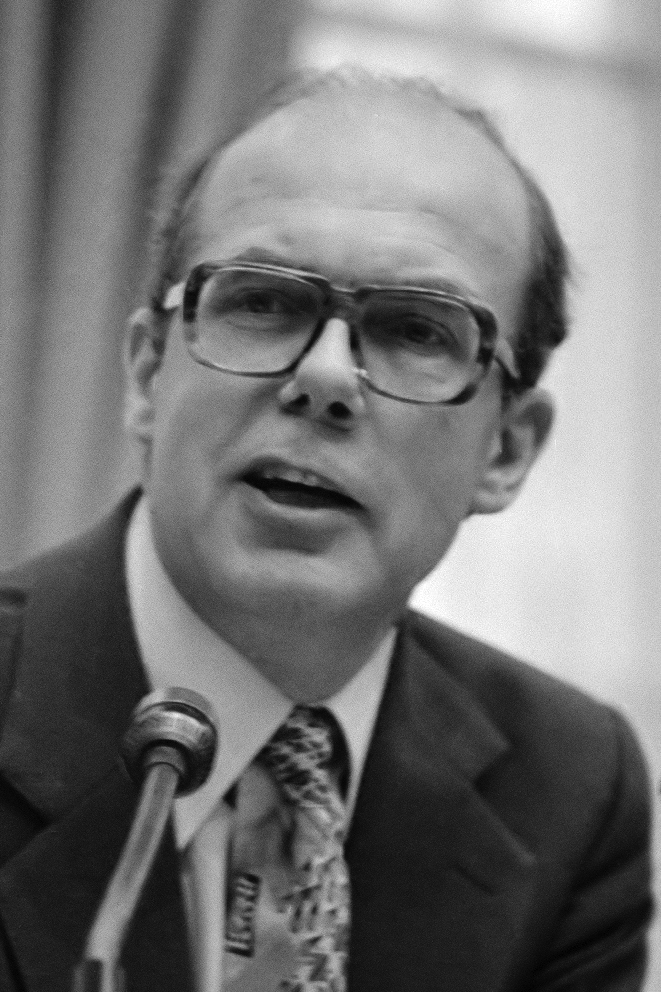
Job de Ruiter was Minister of Justice when the legal provisions on defamation took their current form.

The provisions in the Criminal Code relating to defamation have been little amended over the years. The first amendment occurred in 1934, when the legislator expanded the insult offenses with the criminalization of, among other things, group insult (Art. 137c Sr). In the second paragraph of Article 261, the phrase "or by writings whose content is publicly made audible" was added to the definition of libel. In addition to written and printed libel, it thus also became punishable to disseminate libel via an audio carrier. The legislator primarily thought of then-new technologies such as the phonograph record.

The second amendment came in 1978. This changed the justifications listed in the third paragraph. The word 'demonstrably' was removed, and it was added that someone "could in good faith assume that the alleged fact was true and that the public interest demanded the allegation". The legislator added this sentence to allow more room for political expressions made in the context of public debate. With this last amendment, the defamation offense took its current form. (Note: Only in 1984 was a small change made. With the Act on Classification of Fines (Stb. 1984, 91), the fine amounts were replaced by fine categories.)

== Defamation ==
Defamation is a so-called complaint offense (Article 269 Sr), meaning that the offense can only be prosecuted if the victim has filed a complaint. A complaint is a report with an explicit request for prosecution. (Note: The existence of a complaint can also be assumed, according to the Supreme Court, "if, on the basis of the investigation at the trial, it has been established that the complainant, at the time of drawing up the report, intended that a prosecution should be instituted." However, merely filing a report is not sufficient. Cf. HR June 14, 2016, ECLI:NL:HR:2016:1198, r.o. 2.5, NJ 2016/346, m.nt. N. Keijzer; Janssens, in: T&C Strafrecht 2016, art. 269 Sr, aant. 2 (online, updated September 1, 2017).) Without this complaint, the Public Prosecution Service is inadmissible in its prosecution. However, the existence of a complaint does not oblige the Public Prosecution Service to actually proceed with prosecution: with the complaint requirement, the legislator only offers the victim the possibility to prevent the criminal process from causing further dissemination of the insult. The personal interest of the victim not to be confronted with these negative consequences therefore outweighs the general interest of criminal prosecution.

At the time of the creation of the Criminal Code, the legislator still assumed that only private individuals could be victims of insult. (Note: In the report of the House of Representatives, the Committee of Rapporteurs stated that it considered the insult of "personae morales" or "collectively against associations of persons" undesirable. In addition, it considered that such an expansion would too much limit the freedom of criticism of public authority. See: Kamerstukken II 1879/80, 47, no. 25, p. 155.) Since 1986, the Supreme Court also recognizes legal persons as victims of defamation. Other collectives, such as public authorities, can also be insulted according to the Supreme Court.

In addition to a valid complaint, a conviction for defamation also requires that all elements of the offense have been met. The offense has four: intent, attack on honor or good name, accusation of a specific fact, and the obvious aim to publicize it.

=== Intent ===
In criminal law, 'intent' means that the perpetrator acted knowingly and willingly or purposefully with regard to a certain consequence. Three matters are therefore at play with regard to criminal intent. First, which elements of the offense description fall under the intent requirement, then what the content of criminal intent is, and finally what requirements are placed on the evidence. With regard to the first question, the elements that must have been committed intentionally, the general starting point is that intent refers to all elements that follow the word intentional in the offense description. For defamation, this means that the offensive attack on honor or good name and the purpose of publicizing it must have been committed intentionally.

There is some debate about the content of the required intent in defamation. The ultimately chosen wording ('he who intentionally attacks someone's honor or good name ...') in principle allows for conditional intent. (Note: Conditional intent means that the perpetrator knowingly and willingly or consciously accepted a considerable chance of a certain consequence. Conditional intent is sometimes referred to as 'chance intent'.) However, some in the literature express reservations about the statement that conditional intent is compatible with the entire defamation provision. The objections revolve around the question of whether the mandatory purpose of publicizing the accusation is suitable for this. Someone who acts with conditional intent only accepts the plausible risk of dissemination, while someone whose goal is to disseminate a concrete accusation quickly acts with awareness of that consequence.

The Supreme Court has not yet settled the matter. However, the Supreme Court has further defined the element of intent in the attack on honor or good name. The emphasis here is primarily on the knowledge aspect of intent. It is therefore sufficient that the perpetrator had knowledge that the accusation was offensive to the victim. In a 1980 judgment, the court ruled that intent does not mean an intention to insult. In the same judgment, it also appears that the Supreme Court considers intent with necessary awareness sufficient to assume an offense. (Note: Intent with necessary awareness occurs when someone performs an act aimed at a certain goal, but to achieve this goal it is inevitable that another incidental undesired criminal consequence occurs. If the perpetrator nevertheless proceeds with his plan, he acts with necessary awareness with respect to the incidental undesired consequence.) The lower limit of the culpability element is reached if the perpetrator has not acted knowingly and willingly, but is merely blamed. For example, the court did not agree with the court of appeal's reasoning that the defendant should reasonably have understood that the accusation was insulting.

High demands are not placed on the proof of intent. The knowledge of the insulting nature can be deduced by the judge from the objective circumstances of the offense, for example the form and manner in which the expression was made. This also includes the way in which the accusation is disseminated to the public. If this shows the unnecessarily offensive nature of the accusation, the judge can quickly assume the intent to insult.

=== Attack on honor or good name ===
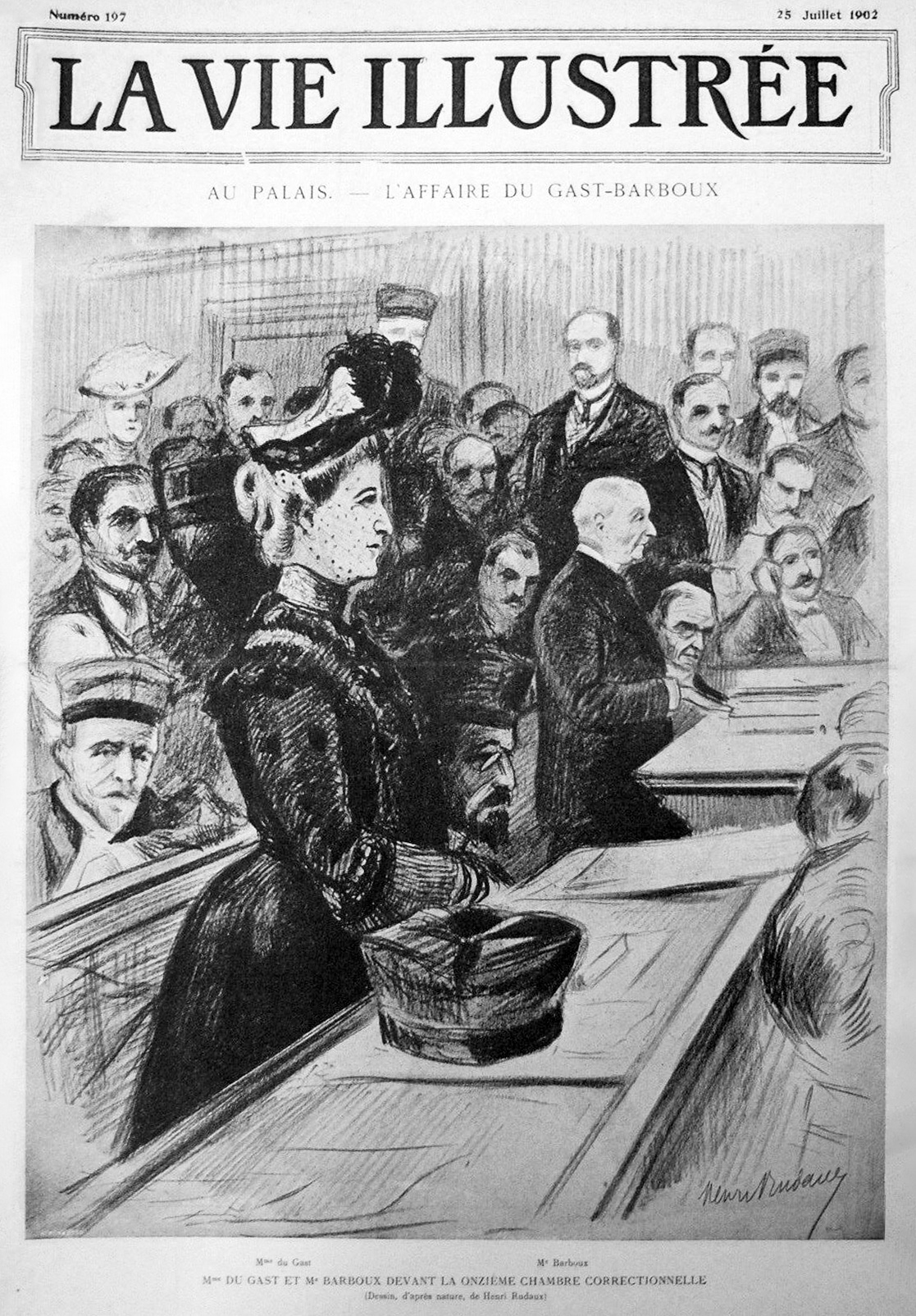
Front page of the newspaper La Vie illustrée depicting Mme Camille du Gast as a defendant in a defamation trial

Defamation is a form of punishable insult. The law itself does not define the concept of insult. It is usually described as 'an attack on one's honor or good name'. For a conviction of defamation, it is necessary that honor or good name has been harmed. In jurisprudence and literature, various interpretations of the concept exist. It is settled case law of the Supreme Court that a statement is insulting "when it aims to place the other in an unfavorable light with the public and to attack him in his honor and good name". In lower jurisprudence, other formulations also occur, such as "publicly discrediting", "unacceptably attacking dignity and humanity" or "placing in a bad light".

Machielse states that the concept of honor includes "the respect to which someone, as a human being, as a moral being, is entitled." (Note: A.J.M. Machielse has been Advocate General at the Supreme Court since 1996. He is also an editor of the legal reference work Noyon/Langemeijer & Remmelink's Wetboek van Strafrecht, where he edited, among other things, the commentary on the insult title.) He believes that by expressing contempt for another person, one does not respect the human being as a whole. Someone who respects another as a human being does not ridicule them. According to Machielse, this also applies if one seriously attacks another's competence in their profession or office. Janssens describes the concept concisely as "the respect due to someone as a human being." There is a subtle difference between the concepts of honor and good name. Honor relates to the offense to one's own sense of honor. Good name, on the other hand, concerns one's honor in the eyes of others. (Note: Compare: Smidt II, p. 387: "The primary requirement for insult is the presence of the animus injuriandi, of the intent either to offend someone's sense of honor, or to diminish someone's honor in the eyes of others.") Good name therefore presupposes the concept of honor and the insult to good name will therefore always have to take place vis-à-vis others.

==== The attack ====
For a conviction for defamation, honor or good name must also have been attacked. The interpretation of the term differs from its use elsewhere in the Criminal Code, such as in self-defense. (Note: Art. 41, first paragraph, Sr reads: "Not punishable is he who commits an act, required by the necessary defense of one's own or another's body, decency or property against immediate, unlawful attack.") There, the word has the meaning of an overwhelming attack on a legal interest. (Note: A legal interest is an interest protected by the legal order, such as public order or physical integrity.) Machielse sees the meaning in defamation as "offensively attacking" honor or good name. Janssens interprets the term 'attack' more neutrally, namely as harming or damaging someone's reputation in public. In the literature, there is also disagreement about whether the term 'attack' includes the unlawfulness of the act. (Note: Unlawfulness is a diffuse legal concept. In criminal law, it forms one of the elements of a criminal offense. It is usually described as the act being contrary to the law and also relates to the justification of the conduct. An act that is unlawful is not justified.) In his dissertation on honor or good name, Hazendonk argues that the attack in defamation should be interpreted as an unlawful attack. (Note: Hazendonk also sees no essential difference between the use of the word attack in defamation and elsewhere in the Criminal Code. The common denominator, according to him, is that it always concerns an unlawful attack.) His view is not followed in the literature, because this would mean that the perpetrator's intent must also be directed at the unlawfulness of the act (so-called malicious intent). (Note: Malicious intent in legal theory means that the perpetrator not only intended to commit the criminal offense, but also intended to violate the criminal norm.) This would mean that not only the offense to honor or good name must be proven, but also that the perpetrator was aware of the unlawfulness of his action. In their handbook on expression offenses, Janssens and Nieuwenhuis point out that it was never the legislator's intention to introduce such a strict intent requirement for defamation.

=== Accusation of a specific fact ===
For a conviction for defamation, it is not sufficient that someone's honor or good name is harmed. The law prescribes a binding means by which the attack on someone's reputation must be made, namely 'by accusing a specific fact'. The concept of fact has a restrictive effect. Not every accusation of a specific fact is suitable to harm someone's honor or good name. For example, the accusation that someone cycled without a bicycle bell (a violation of the Road Traffic Act 1994) will not constitute defamation.

The legislative history indicates that the term should be interpreted in the same way as the term faits (deeds) in Article 367 of the Code pénal. (Note: Art. 367 CP reads: "Guilty of the misdemeanor of slander shall be he who, either in or at public places or gatherings, or in an authentic or public deed, or in a printed or unprinted writing that has been posted, sold or distributed, has accused someone, whoever he may be, of acts which, if they had occurred, would expose the one against whom they are directed to corporal or correctional prosecution, or merely to the contempt and hatred of citizens.") The Code pénal contained a further specification of acts that could harm someone's reputation. These concerned acts that exposed the offended to "corporal or correctional prosecution" (Note: The Code pénal had a classification of criminal offenses into three categories. The lightest category concerned misdemeanors and was punished with police penalties, the middle category was felonies and was punished with correctional penalties. Finally, the heaviest category was crimes and concerned acts punishable by corporal penalties. Art. 367 CP therefore requires the accusation of a felony or a crime.) or "the contempt and hatred of citizens". In current law, this twofold distinction still applies. An accusation only constitutes a specific fact, and thus defamation, if the defamed is accused of a crime, or if the accusation concerns an act that is considered morally reprehensible in society. Due to this equalization, the jurisprudence relating to the old faits-jurisprudence is still relevant.

Not only the fact itself, but also the specificity of the fact is subject to requirements. According to the Supreme Court, there is a specific fact if "the fact has been accused by the person concerned in such a way that it indicates a clearly identifiable concrete act". The accusation must be made in such a way that it is not only clear what kind of act the defamed person has committed, but also which precise act is intended, the so-called faits précis.

However, the jurisprudence concerning what does and does not constitute an accusation of a concrete act is strongly case-specific. In any case, it is not the case if someone is merely attributed a certain characteristic. Nor is there a specific fact if the accusation is made in general terms. However, the accusation does not need to precisely state where and when the acts would have taken place. It is also not necessary for the defamed person to be mentioned by name. It is sufficient if the words allow the conclusion that the defamed person is intended in the accusation. This means that not only a direct accusation constitutes defamation, but that, for example, an interrogative form or indirect accusation is already sufficient for defamation.
