= Verbal aggression =

Personality trait or a mainly destructive form of communication

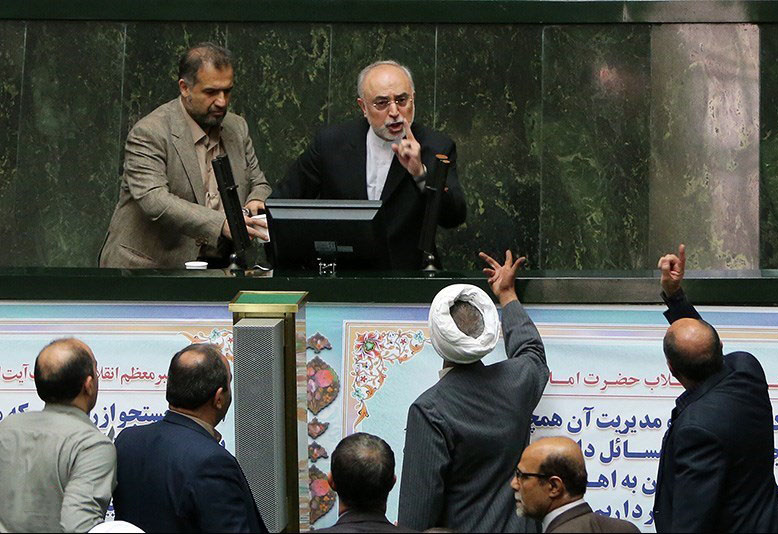
Ali Akbar Salehi using verbal aggression against protesters

Verbal aggression, also known as verbal abuse, refers to the use of “harsh and insulting language directed at a person”. Verbal aggression in communication has been studied to examine the underlying message of how the aggressive communicator gains control over different things that occur, through the usage of verbal aggressiveness. Scholars have identified that individuals who use verbal aggression have the goal of controlling and manipulating others through language. Infante and Wigley defined verbal aggressiveness as "a personality trait that predisposes persons to attack the self-concept of other people instead of, or in addition to, their positions on topics of communication". Verbal aggressiveness is thought to be mainly a destructive form of communication, but it can produce positive outcomes depending on the context. Infante and Wigley described aggressive behavior in interpersonal communication as a product of an individual's aggressive traits and the way the person perceives the aggressive circumstances that prevent them or something in a situation.

Infante, Trebing, Shepard, and Seeds collaborated to showcase the relationship between argumentativeness and verbal aggression. The study investigated two things. The first component investigated whether high, moderate, or low behaviors differ in how easily they are caused by an opponent that selects verbally aggressive responses. The second focused on whether different sexes display different levels of verbal aggression. The results concluded that people who scored high on argumentativeness were the least likely to prefer verbal aggression. Argumentativeness is a constructive, positive trait that recognizes different positions which might exist on issues that are controversial. As for the difference between sexes, males are more likely than females to use verbal aggression because males have been conditioned to be more dominant and competitive.

The Verbal Aggressiveness Scale measures the personality trait of verbal aggressiveness and has been widely used in communication research. The scale has 20 items, 10 that are 10-worded negatively/aggressively, and 10 worded positively/kindly. Infante and Wigley's scale is often scored as unidimensional.

== Verbal Aggressiveness Scale ==
The Verbal Aggressiveness Scale is a tool used to measure how likely someone is to respond to others with hurtful or attacking language. It helps identify how often people use verbal aggression—like insults or harsh criticism—especially when they're trying to deal with conflict or show they’re unhappy. The scale also looks at different ways people might use this kind of language, showing that verbal aggression can take more than one form. The Verbal Aggressiveness Scale "measures verbal aggressiveness across multiple dimensions, including a focus on character assassination, ridicule, and verbal attacks on the person's self-concept". This scale is utilized for understanding how individuals interact during disputes and helps researchers assess the potential negative consequences of verbal aggression in various interpersonal contexts, such as in workplace or personal relationships.

A study investigated the underlying structure of the Verbal Aggressiveness Scale, questioning whether it is truly unidimensional or if it reflects multiple dimensions of verbal aggressiveness. It directly evaluates the scale's psychometric properties using statistical analysis, aiming to refine its theoretical basis and improve its accuracy in measuring verbal aggressiveness. The study and its findings emphasize "the dimensionality of the VAS suggests that verbal aggression is a multifaceted construct, which includes not just direct attacks but also more subtle forms such as threats and sarcasm". The scale was crafted to identify both overt and covert forms of verbal aggression.

== Types of messages ==
- Character attacks
- Competence attacks
- Physical appearance attacks
- Self-concept attacks
- Intentionally vague or ambiguous yet implicit threats
- Insults
- Malediction
- Scolding
- Teasing
- Mockery
- Verbal use of force
- Profanity
- Verbal abuse
- Nonverbal emblems

== Reasons or causes ==
There are four primary reasons or causes suggested by Infante, Trebing, Shepard, and Seeds, which are:

- Frustration—in which a goal is blocked by someone or having to deal with an individual deemed "unworthy" of one's time
- Social learning—in which the aggressive behavior has been learned from observing other individuals
- Psychopathology—in which an individual attacks other persons because of unresolved issues
- Argumentative skill deficiency—in which an individual lacks verbal skills to deal with an issue, and therefore resorts to verbal aggressiveness

These motivators of verbal aggressiveness contribute to an individual with a verbally aggressive personality trait.

More recently Shaw, Kotowski, Boster, and Levine demonstrated that verbal aggression may be caused by variation in prenatal testosterone exposure. They conducted two studies in which they measured the length of the second and fourth digits (2D:4D) on each hand of participants, an indicator of amount of prenatal androgen exposure, and conducted a questionnaire to determine the verbal aggressiveness of participants. A negative correlation between 2D:4D and verbal aggressiveness was determined.

== Effects ==
Self-concept damage is the most fundamental effect, which can cause long lasting and more harmful results than the temporal effects. The more temporal and short term effects are: hurt feelings, anger, irritation, embarrassment, discouragement, humiliation, despair, and depression. Verbal aggressiveness that harms an individual's self-concept can follow an individual throughout their life. For instance, Infante and Wigley state "the self-concept damage done by teasing a child about an aspect of physical appearance can endure for a lifetime and exert an enormous impact on the amount of unhappiness experience". Verbal aggressiveness is also a major cause of violence. When verbal aggressiveness escalates, it can lead to physical violence.

== Constructive ==
The constructive traits which produce satisfaction and increase relationship contentment by helping to increase understandings between the different positions are assertiveness and argumentativeness. Assertiveness is often confused with aggressiveness, but assertive individuals often possess traits like dominance, independence, and competitiveness. Infante and Rancer define argumentativeness as the "trait-like behavior that predisposes an individual to take a stand on controversial issues and attack the positions that other people take". Argumentative individuals focus on the topic rather than attacking an individual. Productive argumentativeness can produce positive outcomes in communication through challenging and defending standpoints through justification. This allows for reasoning between individuals to resolve issue and terminate the disagreement. Argumentative encounters such as this have a positive correlation to relational satisfaction.

== Destructive ==
The destructive traits, hostility and verbal aggressiveness, lead to dissatisfaction in communication and relationship deterioration. Destructive verbal aggressiveness is used for revenge, teasing, and to manipulate others. Verbal aggressiveness is destructive and links to the hostility trait. Unlike argumentativeness, verbal aggressiveness is focused on defending one's identity and attacking others; not trying to resolve the dispute but instead attacking individuals self-concept. Also, verbally aggressive individuals often do not provide as much evidence to support their standpoint. In many cases these individuals possess verbally aggressive traits because they lack the skills to argue rationally and effectively, and therefore use verbally aggressive messages as their defense mechanism. Individuals with argumentative skill deficiency often see violence as their only alternative. These aggressive tactics cause a digression by using personal attacks which do not allow for the disagreement to ever be resolved.

== In romantic relationships ==
The manner in which conflicts are dealt with in romantic relationships differ among each partnership. There are numerous concepts, qualities, and traits that predict the verbal aggressiveness of each partner within a romantic relationship. How couples deal with arguments and controversy has been a major topic amongst researchers for many years. When resolving a dispute is the objective amongst a couple, each individual's argumentative traits come into play. The way in which couples engage and act during a discrepancy can play a chief role in the satisfaction of each partner.

Verbal aggressiveness often results in deterioration of relational satisfaction. Romantically involved couples can perceive verbally aggressive messages as unaffectionate communication. Infante and et al. found that "an act of verbal aggression produces a negative emotional reaction (e.g., anger); the negative reaction can remain covert, leaving a trace effect that can combine additively with subsequent verbal aggression. If the effect if not dissipated through some means, it can lead to the formation of intentions to behave with physical aggression toward the origin or perceived origin of the verbal aggression". Verbal aggressiveness is impacted by the commitment levels of the partners in a relationship. Research findings have shown a negative correlation between commitment and destructive confrontation, and also commitment and communicative acts of abuse.

The arguments that occur between romantic partners play a crucial role in the quality and course of relationships. Arguing successfully means, at least in some part, that a couple will avoid unwarranted negativity and approach discrepancies in confidence that discussing dissimilarities of opinion will supply positive results. Many couples refocus the argument and attack the other partner rather than staying on track with the differences of opinion on a subject. Unhappily married couples tend to use a more destructive approach to conflict. Verbal aggressiveness is resorted to in conflict and controversy. Infante and et al. found that in violent marriages more character attacks and competence attacks are used during disputes. Happily married couples were more likely to resolve disputes without the use of verbally aggressive messages, using instead argumentativeness to negotiate an agreement.

== In families ==
Communication between parents and children influences children and can have important effects for the well-being of the child. It can also have important influences on the relationship between the child and the parent. Muris, Meesters, Morren, and Moorman found that, "attachment style and perceived parent rearing styles that included low levels of emotional warmth were more likely to result in anger and hostility in children". Also, Riesch, Anderson, and Krueger argued that "parent-child communication can help reduce risk behaviors through individual risk factors such as self-esteem, academic achievement, and parental involvement in monitoring". Knapp, Stafford, and Daly stated, "verbally aggressive behavior is contextual: most parents likely have said something verbally aggressive to their child at some point, even if they later regretted doing so".

The parental use of verbal aggressiveness can cause a disruption in the relationship between the child and the parent. When a parent uses verbally aggressive behavior children are often frightened, which leads to avoidance of the parent. The verbal aggressiveness causes the child to feel fear and anxiety and therefore the child loses trust in their relationship. Parental verbal aggressiveness has a negative correlation with relational satisfaction and closeness to their children. Studies found that parents who are verbally aggressive tend to have children who are also verbally aggressive. This is proven through Bandura's social learning theory. Children who are consistently around their parents are likely to model their behavior.

According to the attachment theory, all humans are dependent on one or several individuals during the early years of their lives. It is important to understand how a parent's verbal aggressiveness can change the attachment style the child has toward the parent. If a parent is shown as attacking a child's self-image, it is likely that these attacks will hinder the growth of a confident attachment style. Styron and Janoff-Bulman found, "more than 60% of participants who had been verbally abused as children had reported an insecure attachment style".

The relationship between specific parental behaviors such as verbal aggression and corporal punishment, and the development of oppositional defiant symptoms in girls has been shown to be bidirectional. The researchers emphasized the "reciprocal nature" of this relationship, indicating that the children's oppositional behaviors also "elicited harsher parenting practices". Rather than simply causing defiance, these harsh parenting strategies appear to be both a response to and a reinforcement of oppositional behaviors. In particular, the use of verbal aggression was found to be connected to the emergence of oppositional defiance that over time escalated as those defiant behaviors increased. This bidirectional pattern presented the complex dynamics between parental discipline practices and the emotional and behavioral development of girls, with potential long-term implications for intervention strategies targeting disruptive behavior in children, such interventions may also need to address both parent and child behaviors to break the cycle effectively.

Authoritative parents are characterized by encouraging and democratic behaviors. These types of parents value verbal "give-and-take." Authoritarian parents prefer punishment as a way to control their child's behavior and they value obedience from their children. Parents low in verbal aggression tend to adopt an authoritative parenting style and that is positively related to a secure attachment style.

== In athletics ==
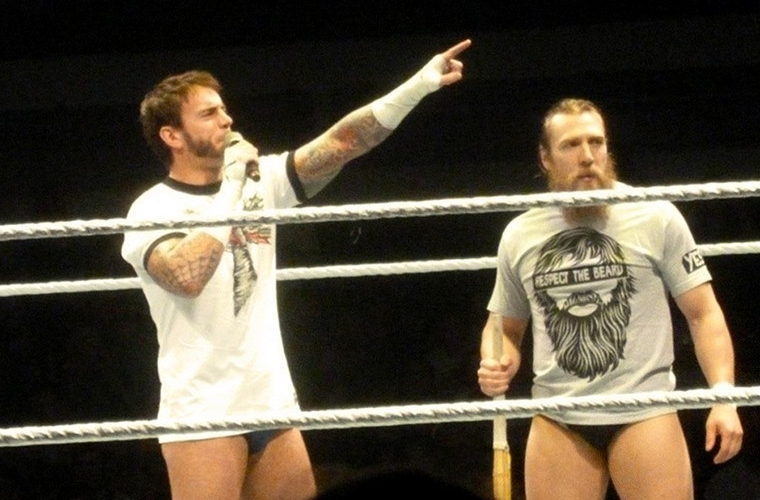
Simulated verbal abuse in combat sports promotions is common

Communication plays a significant role in the athlete-coach relationship. Verbal aggression has been identified as prominent in athletics. Coaches who exhibit verbal aggressive behavior may influence athletes' performance, competence, overall enjoyment, and motivation. Symrpas and Bekiari conducted a study that was aimed to determine two things. The first one was to explore the perceived leadership style and verbal aggressive profile of coaches. The second was to look for differences in athletes' satisfaction and achievement goal orientation based on perceived coaches' leadership style and verbal aggressive profile.

The study supported two profiles of coaches. The first profile included coaches who present a low autocratic (harsh) behavior, high democratic (fair) behavior, and low verbal aggressive behavior. The second profile included coaches who present a high autocratic, low democratic, and high verbal aggressive behavior. Based upon the results, coaches categorized within the first profile promoted athletes' satisfaction where their mental state was filled with compassion. Athletes who are more task-oriented that perform tasks to achieve their desired outcome, considered that their coaches belong to the first profile which did not impact their performance in a negative way.

== In customer service ==
Customer incivility can be described as verbal aggression towards customer service employees. It can negatively impact customer service perceptions and potentially crumble an organization's competitive status. Today, customer incivility is known as customer verbal aggression towards employees through language content and communication style. Customer verbal aggression can happen in places such as restaurants, retail stores, banks, etc.

Verbal aggression in the workplace can have profound psychological and organizational impacts, particularly in customer-facing roles such as banking and service industries. A study found that bank employees frequently experience verbal aggression, which significantly affects their mental well-being and job satisfaction. The study found that verbal aggression is the most prevalent form of workplace violence among bank workers in Italy, with lasting effects on their emotional state and workplace performance. The authors highlighted that "verbal aggression represents a subtle but pervasive threat to employees’ psychological health". Similarly, researchers have explored the broader implications of verbal aggression by examining its effects on bystanders in service settings. Their research revealed that witnessing verbal aggression can evoke strong self-conscious emotions in customers, such as shame and guilt, which in turn influence their perception of the service provider and brand. They argue that "verbal aggression is not only detrimental to the direct target but also disrupts the emotional balance of observing customers".

Walker, Jaarsveld, and Skarlicki performed a study that focused on developing an understanding of what customers do in service events that can increase employee incivility toward others. Employee incivility has four total factors involved: aggressive words, second person pronoun use (you, your), interruptions, and positive emotion words. Positive associations between customer aggressive words and employee incivility was clear when verbal aggression included second person pronouns, labeled as targeted aggression. The researchers observed interactions that included two people between targeted aggression and customer interruptions where employees demonstrated more offensive language when the targeted customer verbal aggression was followed by more interruptions. The 2-way interactions predicting employee incivility was lessened when customers used positive emotion words. Saying something like, "I know you charged me twice, but we can try to work this out together", is an example. The results suggested that customer verbal aggression consumes employees, leading to self-regulation failure. The customer using positive emotional language increases the ability of the employee to engage in self-regulation and reduce incivility.

Self-regulation is important with interactions in the workplace. To communicate effectively in social environments while helping customers, the key objective must be emotional labor. Emotional labor is the self-regulatory process that unfolds over the course of customer interactions, with employees monitoring and adjusting their felt and expressed emotion. A goal in which employees use during emotional labor is to produce effective and emotional displays that enhance the customer experience. The self-regulatory approach provides insight into how felt emotions, displayed emotions, and emotion regulation may relate to each other over time.

== See also ==
- Trash talk
- Verbal abuse
