= Abuse of language =

Abuse of language may refer to:

- Abuse of terminology, in mathematics, a use of terminology in a way that is not formally correct but that simplifies exposition or suggests the correct intuition
- Misnomer, a term which suggests an interpretation that is known to be untrue
- Barbarism (linguistics), use of non-standard language forms
