= Verbal abuse =

Form of abuse using verbal communication for intent to harm person and entity

Verbal abuse (also known as verbal aggression, verbal attack, verbal violence, verbal assault, psychic aggression, or psychic violence) is a type of psychological abuse that involves the use of oral or written language directed to a victim. Verbal abuse can include the act of harassing, labeling, insulting, scolding, rebuking, or excessive yelling towards an individual. It can also include the use of derogatory terms, the delivery of statements intended to frighten, humiliate, denigrate, or belittle a person. These kinds of attacks may result in mental and emotional distress for the victim.

Verbal aggression and abuse affects all populations, cultures, and individuals. These actions are psychologically damaging and are considered forms of emotional and physical harm to the victim. This type of behavior leaves individuals feeling poorly about themselves and can lead to them developing numerous negative health issues and disorders such as suicidal thoughts, depression, poor physical health, anxiety, obsessive-compulsive behaviors, personality disorders, and aggression.

== Types ==
Victims of verbal abuse may display abusive behaviors towards other individuals. Verbal abuse and verbal aggression can take form in many ways. When individuals understand how verbal abuse may be presented, they can better analyze and act accordingly in certain situations. Verbal aggression can be defined as a characteristic or trait that drives a person to attack the self-values and concepts of others in addition to, or instead of, their own values and concepts.

- Accusations: When an individual falsely accuses another individual of performing a certain action
- Bullying: "The use of physical, psychological and verbal aggression to intimidate others to submit to the will of another or cause emotional upset". Bullying is typically one-sided and unprovoked by the victim and can be present in any environment.
  - Threatening: When an aggressor uses words or actions against a victim which indicates that, if the victim does not comply with certain situations or actions, harm will be inflicted upon them.
- Denial of wrongdoing: When an individual denies his/her actions performed against another individual that could have or did cause the victim harm to self-preserve and protect the abuser.
  - Gaslighting: The abuser makes the victim question not just their own self, but also their own sanity. One way abusers tend to use gaslighting is by questioning the victim in a manner that gets the victim to question their own perceptions of things. The effects of gaslighting include, individuals seeing themselves as outsiders, having low self-esteem, and feeling like they have no support in decision making.
  - Minimization: Refers to when the abuser is attempting to down-scale the severity of the situation and making it seem insignificant to the victim or audience
- Name calling: The use of offensive language/names to gain something from the situation (ex: win an argument) or to probe a negative reaction out of another individual or situation; this is also used to induce rejection or condemnation without consideration of the facts in the situation.

== Impacts ==
=== Age ===
==== Children and adolescents ====
Research shows that if a young child has been constantly verbally abused over the years they begin to develop constant feelings of mistrust, shame, doubt, guilt, and inferiority. Studies show that two out of three American children are victims of experiencing verbal aggression from their parents. This can affect their mental, social, and interpersonal development during the most critical psychological developmental years which are generally between 2 and 19 years of age. It has been found that verbally abusive behaviors in young children are generally learned through an adult role model such as a parent or caregiver. There are various ways a caregiver can use verbal communication to abuse a child: rejection of a child's worth, isolating a child from social experiences, terrorizing a child with verbal assaults, ignoring a child's needs, corrupting a child's views of the world and teaching them that delinquent activity is normal, verbally assaulting a child, and over-pressuring a child to mature faster than the normal rate of maturity for the child's age. Children who have experienced maternal verbal abuse have been more likely to develop personality disorders in their adolescent and young adult years, they have also been known to develop obsessive-compulsive characteristics and narcissistic behaviors.

==== College students ====
It has been found that verbal abuse damages the self-esteem of students, places irrational blame onto themselves, and affects mental health and social interaction abilities in the students; this type of abuse in students can be projected through their peers and professors. The effects of experiencing verbal abuse as a young child – developing negative feelings and in some occurrences, mental disorders – bled onto young adulthood and when they are moving onto higher education and becoming a young adult, they are more prone to experience more of these negative feelings, disorders, and even have an increased chance of drug use in adulthood. In the college population, research has shown that one of the most impactful forms of verbal abuse was peer-related verbal abuse which started with a student blaming another peer for something they did not do and escalated to yelling, cursing, and using derogatory terms; this type of abuse has been associated with increasing the risks of the student falling into a depressive mood, developing anxiety, anger-hostility, and other emotional barriers.

=== Gender ===
Research has shown that in some grade-school scenarios – specifically middle school – verbal aggression is prevalent between boys and girls in different ways. Boys experienced insults and threats to a greater extent, while girls experienced sexual name-calling to a greater extent. Boys were often verbally abusive towards other boys and girls, this showed researchers that these characteristics were used to build masculinity amongst themselves. Often, boys are portrayed as needing to be "tough" or masculine, to be able to paint this image, they often resort to verbal abuse, which in turn, made them unfavorable to girls. Verbally abusive girls' reasoning for their actions of abuse was that they, in turn, were victims of bullying or verbal abuse by their peers or instructors because some of the girls would display the wrong kind of sexuality, femininity, and social age – according to their peers' and instructors' judgments.

In some instances, the victims can become the perpetrators. It has been shown that Hispanic women who have experienced verbal conflicts or abuse with their father also go on to have verbal conflicts or abuse with their daughter. When Hispanic mothers exert a high level of verbal conflicts or abuse towards her husband, their daughter most likely will have a conflict with them – her parents as well, when this happens it is also predicted that the daughter will go on to have the same conflicts with her partner. In America, a vulnerable group for verbal aggression are college-aged women. 80% of these women are aware that verbal abuse is a serious ongoing issue and 25% of them have reported to have experienced verbal abuse in an intimate relationship. In other instances, 65% of 358 low-income pregnant women claimed to have experienced verbal or physical abuse during their pregnancies, with younger women experiencing significantly higher rates of this abuse.

=== Abuse in the workplace ===
The workplace can be a breeding ground for verbal aggression, especially against ethnic minorities. In a study where 1000 nurses received a questionnaire and 46% responded, 91% of them claimed that they had experienced verbal abuse within the past month and more than 50% of them said that they did not feel capable of responding to the abuse. Adults who have been victims of verbal abuse and workplace mistreatment have been more susceptible to suffer from mental health illnesses and social disorders.

=== Relationships ===
In romantic relationships, specifically physically and verbally abusive ones, it has been found that when the couple has a conflict, 53% of the victims to this abuse say that physical aggression was the factor that started the conflict while 33% of the aggressors, in this case, claim that verbal aggression was the factor that ignited the issue. It is not a surprise that both the victim and the aggressor have different points of views as to what caused the abuse to escalate. In marital relationships, it is common to see that if one individual – whether it be the husband or wife – has trouble communicating their needs and expectations to their partner, instead of having "healthy" discussion, they resort to using verbal aggression against their partner which in turn causes more distress and conflict in the relationship. Just like in the workplace, adults who have experienced intimate partner violence have also had their mental health and brain morphology be affected.
