= Turkism Day =

Turkish holiday

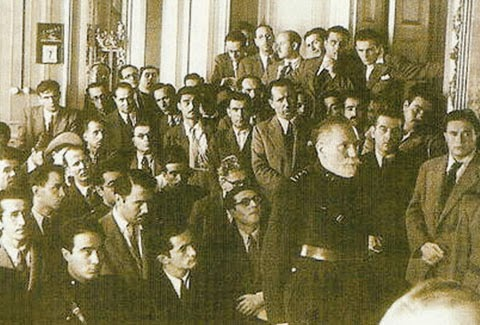
Defendants of the Racism-Turanism trials

Turkism Day (Turkish: Türkçülük Günü), or Turkists' Day (Turkish: Türkçüler Günü), is celebrated on 3 May since 1945 in memory of the rallies in defense of Nihal Atsız, who was prosecuted for defamation by Sabahattin Ali, whom Atsiz called a Soviet spy in an article he wrote.

For the second hearing in his trial against Ali, Atsiz's supporters welcomed him arriving at Ankara train station, where they burned books by Ali and Nâzım Hikmet. The rally was mainly by racists and Turanists who shouted slogans against communists. During the trial, they massed in the courtroom, as well in front of the court. They later marched to Ulus Square, where they eventually clashed with the police. Following the rally, many participants were arrested, and some of them were defendants in the Racism Turanism trial.

Reha Oğuz Türkkan, Atsız, Alparslan Türkeş, Nejdet Sançar and others who were imprisoned in the Tophane Military Prison held a reunion on 3 May 1945 to remember the rallies in support of Atsız. That was the start of Turkism Day, which is celebrated by the Turkish Hearths, the Nationalist Movement Party (MHP) (under the name of Nationalists' Day), the Good Party (İyi Party), and other Turkish nationalist organizations.

In 1967, the Union of Turkish Nationalists published a book in memory of Turkism Day.
