= Xenophobia and discrimination in Turkey =

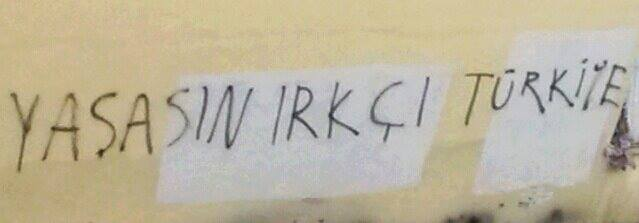
‘Long Live Racist Turkey’ spray-painted by unidentified people on the walls of an Armenian church in Istanbul

In Turkey, xenophobia and discrimination are present in its society and throughout its history, including ethnic discrimination, religious discrimination and institutional racism against non-Turkish, non-Kemalist, non-Muslim and non-Sunni minorities. This appears mainly in the form of negative attitudes and actions by some people towards people who are not ethnically Turkish, including non-Turkish Muslims (notably Kurds and Arabs), Christians (notably Armenians, Assyrians, and Greeks), Jews, and peripatetic groups (notably Romani people, Domari, Abdals and Lom.)

Scholars characterize Sunni Turkishness as comprising the ethnoculturally dominant identity, arguing that state-sponsored Turkification policies have contributed to the assimilation, marginalization, and discrimination of Turkey's ethnoreligious minorities. Multiple scholars have characterized Turkey as an apartheid state, arguing that its institutions were founded upon systematic ethnic, religious, and cultural discrimination originating in the Ottoman millet system and which persists into the present. These scholars assert there being a three-tiered hierarchy of citizenship: Sunni Muslim Turks at the top, Alevis and non-Turkish Muslims in an intermediate category, and Christians and Jews at the bottom.

In recent years, racism in Turkey has increased towards Middle Eastern nationals such as Syrian refugees, Afghan, Pakistani, and African migrants. There is also reported rising resentment towards the influx of Russians and Ukrainians in the country as a result of the Ukrainian war from Turks who claim it is creating a housing crisis for locals.

== Overview ==
Muslim and non-Muslim population in Turkey, 1914–2005 (in thousands)
Year	1914	1927	1945	1965	1990	2005
Muslims	12,941	13,290	18,511	31,139	56,860	71,997
Greeks	1,549	110	104	76	8	3
Armenians	1,204	77	60	64	67	50
Jews	128	82	77	38	29	27
Others	176	71	38	74	50	45
Total	15,997	13,630	18,790	31,391	57,005	72,120
% non-Muslim	19.1	2.5	1.5	0.8	0.3	0.2

Racism and discrimination in Turkey can be traced back to the Ottoman Empire. In the 1860s, some Ottoman Turkish intellectuals, such as Ali Suavi stated that:

1. Turks are superior to other races in political, military and cultural aspects
2. The Turkish language surpasses the European languages in its richness and excellence
3. Turks constructed the Islamic civilization.

In the 1920s and 1930s racism became an influential aspect in Turkish politics which was supported by the Turkish Government. Through the Turkish History Thesis and the Sun Language Theory, a Turkish racial superiority was to be scientifically proven. The Turkish History Thesis claimed a Turkish racial origin of the modern European people, while the Sun Language Theory called the Turks as having been the first people to have spoken, therefore being Turkish the origin of all other languages. Congresses to promote those ideas to the western scholar world were organized in Turkey.

According to scholar Ayhan Aktar, one of the goals during the establishment of Turkey was to ensure "the domination of Turkish ethnic identity in every aspect of social life from the language that people speak in the streets to the language to be taught at schools, from the education to the industrial life, from the trade to the cadres of state officials, from the civil law to the settlement of citizens to particular regions."

The State Employee Law enacted in 1926 aimed at the Turkification of work life in Turkey. This law defined Turkishness as a condition which was necessary for a person who wished to become a state employee. As in 1932 Keriman Halis Ece was elected Miss Universe, the Turkish President Mustafa Kemal (Atatürk) was pleased with the fact that an international jury found a woman representing the essence of the Turkish race the one.

Early racists in Turkey were Nihal Atsız and Reha Oğuz Türkkan, who both competed by applying the correct way in defining Turkishness. The two were charged in the Racism–Turanism Trial in 1944 together with other 21 defendants which included Zeki Velidi Togan and Alparslan Türkeş. Several defendants were sentenced to jail terms, but after a retrial in October 1945 they were all acquitted. The Turkish idealist movement is influenced by Adolf Hitler's views of racism. His book Mein Kampf (Turkish: Kavgam), is very popular amongst right-wing politicians, and as Bülent Ecevit wanted to ban its sale in Turkey, they prevented it.

In Turkey in 2002 the Ministry of Education adopted an educational curriculum with respect to the Armenians which was widely condemned as racist and chauvinistic. The curriculum contained textbooks which included phrases such as "we crushed the Greeks" and "traitor to the nation." Thereafter, civic organizations, including the Turkish Academy of Sciences, published a study which deplored all racism and sexism in textbooks. However, a report which was published by the Minority Rights Group International (MRG) in 2015 states that the curriculum in schools continues to depict "Armenians and Greeks as the enemies of the country." Nurcan Kaya, one of the authors of the report, concluded: "The entire education system is based on Turkishness. Non-Turkish groups are either not referred to or referred in a negative way."

As of 2008 Turkey has also seen an increase in "hate crimes" which are motivated by racism, nationalism, and intolerance. According to Ayhan Sefer Üstün, the head of the parliamentary Human Rights Investigation Commission, "Hate speech is on the rise in Turkey, so new deterrents should be introduced to stem the increase in such crimes". Despite provisions in the Constitution and the laws there have been no convictions for a hate crime so far, for either racism or discrimination. In Turkey since the beginning of 2006, a number of killings have been committed against people who are members of ethnic and religious minority groups, people who have a different sexual orientation and people who profess a different social/sexual identity. Article 216 of the Turkish Penal Code imposes a general ban against publicly inciting people's hatred and disgust.

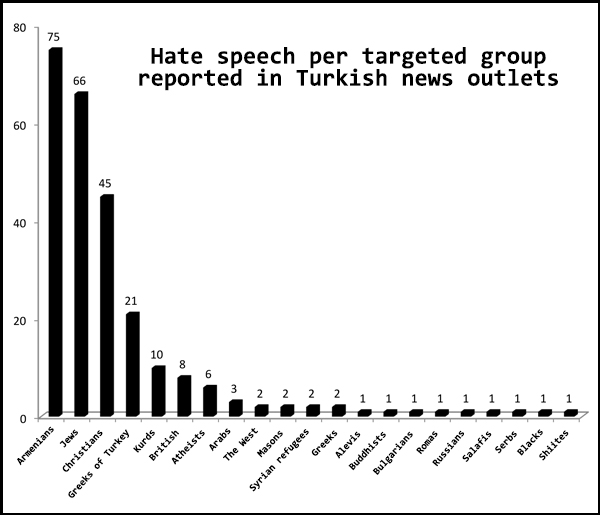
Accounts of hate speech towards targeted groups in Turkish news outlets according to the January–April 2014 Media Watch on Hate Speech and Discriminatory Language Report by Nefret Soylemi and the Hrant Dink Foundation.

According to an article which was written in 2009 by Yavuz Baydar, a senior columnist for the daily newspaper the Zaman, racism and hate speech are on the rise in Turkey, particularly against Armenians and Jews. On 12 January 2009, he wrote that "If one goes through the press in Turkey, one would easily find cases of racism and hate speech, particularly in response to the deplorable carnage and suffering in Gaza. These are the cases in which there is no longer a distinction between criticizing and condemning Israel's acts and placing Jews on the firing line." In 2011 Asli Çirakman asserted that there has been an apparent rise in the expression of xenophobic feeling against the Kurdish, Armenian, and Jewish presences in Turkey. Çirakman also noted that the ethno-nationalist discourse of the 2000s identifies the enemies—within as the ethnic and religious groups which reside in Turkey, such as the Kurds, the Armenians, and the Jews.

In 2011, a Pew Global Attitudes and Trends survey of 1,000 Turks found that 6% of them had a favorable opinion of Christians, and 4% of them had a favorable opinion of Jews. Earlier, in 2006, the numbers were 16% and 15%, respectively. The Pew survey also found that 72% of Turks viewed Americans as hostile, and 70% of them viewed Europeans as hostile. When asked to name the world's most violent religion, 45% of Turks cited Christianity and 41% cited Judaism, with 2% saying that it was Islam. Additionally, 65% of Turks said the Westerners were "immoral".

One of the main challenges which is facing Turkey according to the European Commission against Racism and Intolerance (ECRI) is the need to reconcile the strong sense of national identity and the wish to preserve the unity and integrity of the State with the right of different minority groups to express their own senses of ethnic identity within Turkey, for example, the right of a minority group to develop its own sense of ethnic identity through the maintenance of that ethnic identity's linguistic and cultural aspects.

In a recent discovery by the Armenian newspaper Agos, secret racial codes were used to classify minority communities in the country. According to the racial code, which is believed to be established during the foundations of the republic in 1923, Greeks are classified under the number 1, Armenians 2, and Jews 3. Altan Tan, a deputy of the Peace and Democracy Party (BDP), believed that such codes were always denied by Turkish authorities but stated that "if there is such a thing going on, it is a big disaster. The state illegally profiling its own citizens based on ethnicity and religion, and doing this secretly, is a big catastrophe".

According to research which was conducted by Istanbul Bilgi University, with the support of the Scientific and Technological Research Council of Turkey (TÜBITAK) between 2015 and 2017, 90 percent of youths said they would not want their daughters to marry someone who was "from the 'other' group." While 80 percent of youths said they would not want to have a neighbor who was from the "other," 84 percent said they would not want their children to be friends with children who were from the "other" group. 84 percent said they would not do business with members of the "other" group. 80 percent said they would not hire anyone who was from the "other." Researchers conducted face-to-face interviews with young people between the ages of 18 and 29. When they were asked to state which groups they most perceived to be the "other," they ranked homosexuals first with 89 percent, atheists and nonbelievers ranked second with 86 percent, people from other faiths ranked third with 82 percent, minorities stood at 75 percent and extremely religious people ranked fifth with 74 percent.

Racist and xenophobic rhetoric has also appeared in political and public discourse. Uğur Derin argues that the late-Erdoğan administration attributed "every possible problem to internal and external enemies." He writes that, in Turkey, "personae non gratae" have commonly been associated with Armenians, Greeks and Jews, alongside anti-communist and racial slurs.

=== Ethnoreligious hierarchy and apartheid accusation ===
Scholars have characterized Turkishness (particularly Sunni Turks) as comprising the ethnoculturally dominant identity, arguing that state-sponsored Turkification policies have contributed to the assimilation, marginalization, and discrimination of Turkey's ethnoreligious minorities. Political scientist Thomas W. Smith writes that "all but the most folkloric of minority cultural expressions have been discouraged" within the country, describing how Turkish nationalism has disadvantaged minority communities through language, education, religious, and cultural policies. Sociologist İpek Demir characterizes Turkishness as a "master identity", while Zeki Sarigil identifies documents substantial prejudice against ethnic minorities. Within Turkish society, the term giaour continues to be used as a derogatory for non-Muslims, particularly Christians. In a 2021 speech, President Recep Tayyip Erdoğan used the term. Religious affiliation outside the Sunni majority is a cause of workplace discrimination. Freedom House states that non-Muslims face "systemic discrimination in schools and public-sector employment", alongside hate speech, property damage, and occasional violence. The European Commission's 2026 report identifies the lack of legal personality for non-Muslim religious communities and their places of worship, the continued closure of the Greek Orthodox Halki Seminary, and cases in which Protestant children were required to select Sunni Islamic courses despite their entitlement to exemptions.

During the Lausanne negotiations, Turkish delegate Rıza Nur opposed exempting non-Muslims from military conscription, later explaining in his memoirs that compulsory service would encourage Christians to emigrate. Reluctance to serve was fueled by fears of persecution, forced labor, religious discrimination, and economic hardship, particularly following the massacres of Christian conscripts in Ottoman labor battalions during World War I. Sociologist Yeşim Bayar identifies Nur's policy as an instrument of demographic homogenization, contradicting official claims of equal citizenship.

Other researchers have documented the enforcement of Turkish linguistic dominance through campaigns against minority languages, the assimilation of Laz communities through educational policies and socioeconomic incentives, and early republican economic policies favoring a Turkish capitalist class at the expense of non-Muslim minorities, particularly Christians.

According to scholar Ayhan Aktar, one of the goals during the establishment of Turkey was to ensure "the domination of Turkish ethnic identity in every aspect of social life from the language that people speak in the streets to the language to be taught at schools, from the education to the industrial life, from the trade to the cadres of state officials, from the civil law to the settlement of citizens to particular regions." Several scholars have characterized the dominance of Turkish national culture and the suppression of minority identities in Turkey as forms of genocide.

Several Turkish historians and political scholars have characterized Turkey as an apartheid state, arguing that its political and legal institutions were founded upon systematic ethnic, religious, and cultural discrimination that persists into the present. Taner Akçam traces the system to the Turkish War of Independence and the establishment of the Republic during the Turkish National Movement between 1918 and 1923, arguing that the new state combined the religious hierarchies of the Ottoman millet system with ethnic Turkish nationalism and colonial practices, creating a three-tiered hierarchy of citizenship: Sunni Muslim Turks at the top, Alevis and non-Turkish Muslims in an intermediate category, and Christians and Jews at the bottom. Proponents cite legislation and administrative practices that excluded Christians from certain parliamentary elections, confiscated Christian properties, restricted the residence and movements of Christians, classified and surveilled citizens according to ethnic ancestry. Kılıçdağı emphasizes that these practices constituted institutionalized discrimination embedded in laws, decrees, and administrative directives rather than isolated incidents of prejudice, citing parliamentary proceedings revealing deliberate efforts to deny Christian citizens restitution for confiscated property. Akçam further distinguishes between the forced assimilation of non-Turkish Muslims and the enduring exclusion of Christians and Jews, arguing that these policies institutionalized unequal citizenship. Köker endorses the characterization, arguing that the discriminatory order was integral to the Republic's founding rather than a subsequent deviation from its principles, while Akçam maintains that understanding Turkey's history through the establishment of apartheid, rather than exclusively through national liberation, is essential.

== Ethnic-based ==
=== Against Arabs ===
Turkey has a history of strong anti-Arab sentiment. Systemic racism against Arabs in Turkey has deep historical roots, dating back to the transition from the Ottoman Empire to the modern Republic of Turkey. In Turkish history textbooks, the Arab Revolt is portrayed as the main cause of the collapse of the Ottoman Empire, while Arab contributions to the support of Ottoman sovereignty, like the alliance with Emirate of Jabal Shammar are ignored. Therefore hatred and negative sentiments towards Arabs based on simplification and misunderstanding of history are very common in Turkish society and government.

Following the founding of the Turkish Republic in 1923, Mustafa Kemal Atatürk introduced a policy of secularization and westernization that emphasized "Turkish" identity and extremely marginalize Arab elements in everyday life. Ataturk's reforms brutally eliminated Arab influence from Turkish socio-culture. The elimination of Arab influence even touched the realm of religious rituals, with the forced use of the Turkish adhan to replace the Islamic adhan, which is universally recited in Arabic.

Hatred and racism against Arabs has been on a significant rise because of the Syrian refugee crisis. Haaretz reported that anti-Arab racism in Turkey mainly affects two groups; tourists from the Gulf who are characterized as "rich and condescending" and the Syrian refugees in Turkey. Haaretz also reported that anti-Syrian sentiment in Turkey is metastasizing into a general hostility toward all Arabs including the Palestinians. Ümit Özdağ, a politician from the Victory Party, warned that Turkey risks becoming a "Middle Eastern country" due to the influx of Arab refugees, and he is also known for his racial rhetoric against Arab refugees and Arabs as a whole.

There are also racist stereotypes in Turkish popular culture, where the term "Arab" was once used as a derogatory term for a black dog, reflecting deep-rooted racist views against Arab in Turkish society.

=== Against Armenians ===
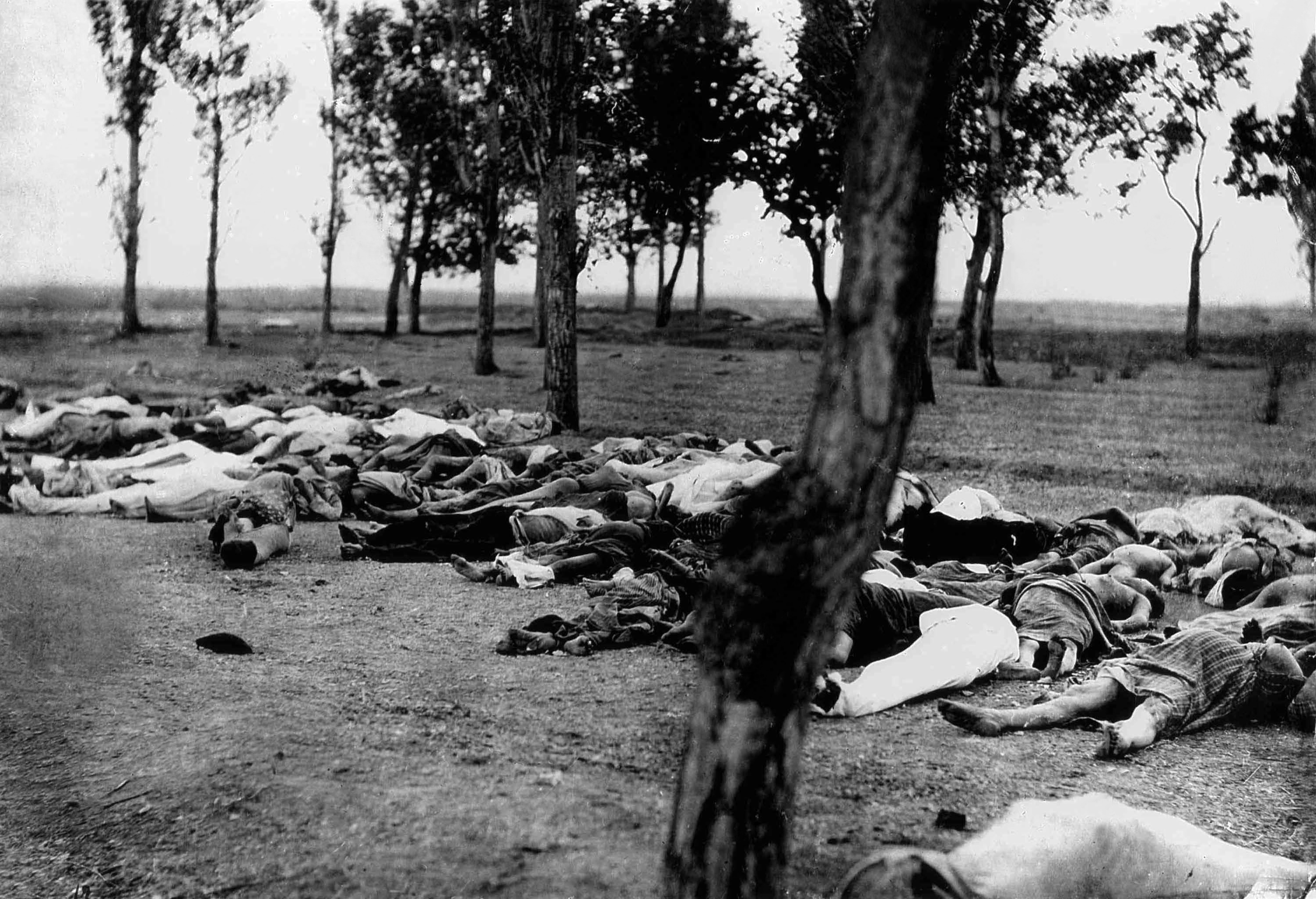
The Armenian genocide was the Ottoman government's systematic extermination of its Armenian subjects within the territory constituting the present-day Republic of Turkey. The total number of Armenians who were killed has been estimated at 1.5 million.

Although it was possible for Armenians to achieve status and wealth in the Ottoman Empire, as a community, they were accorded a status as second-class citizens (under the Millet system) and were regarded as fundamentally alien to the Muslim character of Ottoman society. In 1895, demands for reform among the Armenian subjects of the Ottoman Empire lead to Sultan Abdul Hamid's decision to suppress them resulting in the Hamidian massacres in which up to 300,000 Armenians were killed and many more tortured. In 1909, a massacre of Armenians in the city of Adana resulted in a series of anti-Armenian pogroms throughout the district resulting in the deaths of 20,000–30,000 Armenians. During World War I, the Ottoman government massacred between 1 and 1.5 million Armenians in the Armenian genocide. The position of the current Turkish government, however, is that the Armenians who died were casualties of the expected hardships of war, the casualties cited are exaggerated, and that the 1915 events could not be considered a genocide. This position has been criticized by international genocide scholars, and by 28 governments, which have resolutions affirming the genocide.

"The new generations are being taught to see Armenians not as human, but [as] an entity to be despised and destroyed, the worst enemy. And the school curriculum adds fuel to the existing fires."

— Turkish lawyer Fethiye Çetin

Some difficulties currently experienced by the Armenian minority in Turkey are a result of an anti-Armenian attitude by ultra-nationalist groups such as the Grey Wolves. According to Minority Rights Group, while the government officially recognizes Armenians as minorities but when used in public, this term denotes second-class status. In Turkey, the term 'Armenian' has often been used as an insult. Kids are taught at a young age to hate Armenians and the "Armenian" and several people have been prosecuted for calling public figures and politicians as such.

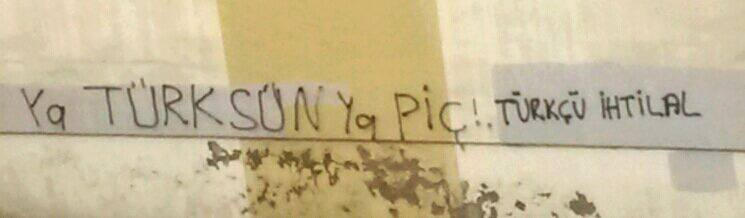
‘You Are Either a Turk, or a Bastard,’ near the wall of an Armenian church in Kadıköy, Istanbul.

The term 'Armenian' is frequently used in politics to discredit political opponents. In 2008, Canan Arıtman, a deputy of İzmir from the Republican People's Party (CHP), called President Abdullah Gül an 'Armenian'. Arıtman was then prosecuted for "insulting" the president. Similarly, in 2010, Turkish journalist Cem Büyükçakır approved a comment on his website claiming that President Abdullah Gül's mother was an Armenian. Büyükçakır was then sentenced to 11 months in prison for "insulting President [Abdullah] Gül".

Shortly after Hrant Dink was murdered, the assassin was honored as a hero while in police custody, posing with a Turkish flag with policemen.

Hrant Dink, the editor of the Agos weekly Armenian newspaper, was assassinated in Istanbul on 19 January 2007, by Ogün Samast. He was reportedly acting on the orders of Yasin Hayal, a militant Turkish ultra-nationalist. For his statements on Armenian identity and the Armenian genocide, Dink had been prosecuted three times under Article 301 of the Turkish Penal Code for "insulting Turkishness." He had also received numerous death threats from Turkish nationalists who viewed his "iconoclastic" journalism (particularly regarding the Armenian genocide) as an act of treachery.

Sevag Balikci, a Turkish soldier of Armenian descent, was shot dead on 24 April 2011, the day of the commemoration of the Armenian genocide, during his military service in Batman. Through his Facebook profile, it was discovered that killer Kıvanç Ağaoğlu was an ultra-nationalist, and a sympathizer of nationalist politician Muhsin Yazıcıoğlu and Turkish agent / contract killer Abdullah Çatlı, who himself had a history of anti-Armenian activity, such as the Armenian Genocide Memorial bombing in a Paris suburb in 1984. His Facebook profile also showed that he was a Great Union Party (BBP) sympathizer, a far-right nationalist party in Turkey. Balıkçı's fiancée testified that Sevag told her over the phone that he feared for his life because a certain military serviceman threatened him by saying, "If war were to happen with Armenia, you would be the first person I would kill".

İbrahim Şahin and 36 other alleged members of Turkish ultra-nationalist Ergenekon group were arrested in January, 2009 in Ankara. The Turkish police said the round-up was triggered by orders Şahin gave to assassinate 12 Armenian community leaders in Sivas. According to the official investigation in Turkey, Ergenekon also had a role in the murder of Hrant Dink.

In February 2015, banners celebrating the genocide were spotted in several cities throughout Turkey. They declared: "We celebrate the 100th anniversary of our country being cleansed of Armenians. We are proud of our glorious ancestors."

On 26 February 2012, the Istanbul rally to commemorate the Khojaly massacre turned into an Anti-Armenian demonstration which contained hate speech and threats towards Armenia and Armenians. Chants and slogans during the demonstration include: "You are all Armenian, you are all bastards", "bastards of Hrant can not scare us", and "Taksim Square today, Yerevan Tomorrow: We will descend upon you suddenly in the night."

In February 2015, graffiti was discovered near the wall of an Armenian church in the Kadıköy district of Istanbul saying, "You’re Either Turkish or Bastards" and "You Are All Armenian, All Bastards". It is claimed that the graffiti was done by organizing members of a rally entitled "Demonstrations Condemning the Khojali Genocide and Armenian Terror." The Human Rights Association of Turkey petitioned the local government of Istanbul calling it a "Pretext to Incite Ethnic Hate Against Armenians in Turkey". In the same month banners celebrating the Armenian genocide were spotted in several cities throughout Turkey. They declared: "We celebrate the 100th anniversary of our country being cleansed of Armenians. We are proud of our glorious ancestors." (Yurdumuzun Ermenilerden temizlenişinin 100. yıldönümü kutlu olsun. Şanlı atalarımızla gurur duyuyoruz.)

=== Against Assyrians ===
The Assyrians also shared a similar fate to that of the Armenians. The Assyrians also suffered in 1915 and they were massacred en masse. The Assyrian genocide or the Seyfo (as it is known to Assyrians) reduced the population of the Assyrians of Anatolia and the Iranian plateau from about 650,000 before the genocide to 250,000 after the genocide.

Discrimination continued well into the newly formed Turkish Republic. In the aftermath of the Sheikh Said rebellion, the Assyrian Orthodox Church was subjected to harassment by Turkish authorities, on the grounds that some Assyrians allegedly collaborated with the rebelling Kurds. Consequently, mass deportations took place and Patriarch Mar Ignatius Elias III was expelled from Mor Hananyo Monastery which was turned into a Turkish barrack. The patriarchal seat was then transferred to Homs temporarily.

Assyrians historically couldn't become civil servants in Turkey and they couldn't attend military schools, become officers in the army or join the police.

=== Against Greeks ===
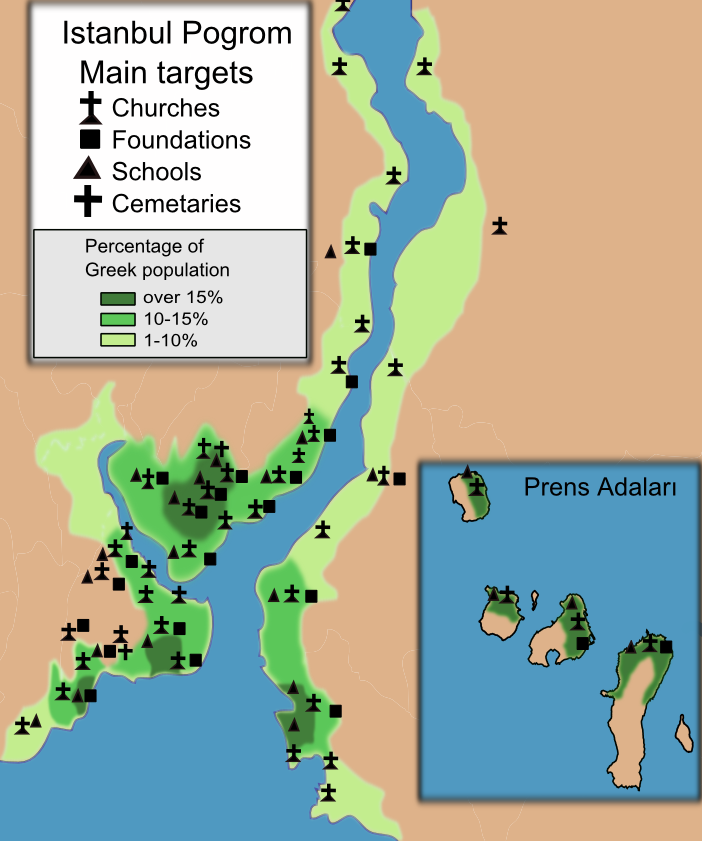
The main targets of the anti-Greek riots in Istanbul; 6–7 September 1955.

Punitive Turkish nationalist exclusivist measures, such as a 1932 parliamentary law, barred Greek citizens living in Turkey from a series of 30 trades and professions from tailoring and carpentry to medicine, law and real estate. The Varlık Vergisi tax imposed in 1942 also served to reduce the economic potential of Greek businesspeople in Turkey. On 6–7 September 1955 anti-Christian riots were orchestrated in Istanbul by the Turkish military's Tactical Mobilization Group, the seat of Operation Gladio's Turkish branch; the Counter-Guerrilla. The events were triggered by the news that the Turkish consulate in Thessaloniki, north Greece—the house where Mustafa Kemal Atatürk was born in 1881—had been bombed the day before. A bomb planted by a Turkish usher of the consulate, who was later arrested and confessed, incited the events. The Turkish press conveying the news in Turkey was silent about the arrest and instead insinuated that Greeks had set off the bomb. Although the mob did not explicitly call for Greeks to be killed, over a dozen people died during or after the pogrom as a result of beatings and arson. Kurds, Jews, Armenians, Assyrians, Minority Muslims and Non-Muslim Turks were also harmed. In addition to commercial targets, the mob clearly targeted property owned or administered by the Greek Orthodox Church. 73 churches and 23 schools were vandalized, burned or destroyed, as were 8 asperses and 3 monasteries.

The pogrom greatly accelerated emigration of ethnic Greeks from Turkey, and the Istanbul region in particular. The Greek population of Turkey declined from 119,822 persons in 1927, to about 7,000 in 1978. In Istanbul alone, the Greek population decreased from 65,108 to 49,081 between 1955 and 1960.

The Greek minority continues to encounter problems relating to education and property rights. A 1971 law nationalized religious high schools, and closed the Halki seminary on Istanbul's Heybeli Island which had trained Orthodox clergy since the 19th century. A later outrage was the vandalism of the Greek cemetery on Imbros on 29 October 2010. In this context, problems affecting the Greek minority on the islands of Imbros and Tenedos continue to be reported to the European Commission.

As of 2007, Turkish authorities have seized a total of 1,000 immovables of 81 Greek organizations as well as individuals of the Greek community. On the other hand, Turkish courts provided legal legitimacy to unlawful practices by approving discriminatory laws and policies that violated fundamental rights they were responsible to protect. As a result, foundations of the Greek communities started to file complaints after 1999 when Turkey's candidacy to the European Union was announced. Since 2007, decisions are being made in these cases; the first ruling was made in a case filed by the Phanar Greek Orthodox College Foundation, and the decision was that Turkey violated Article 1 of Protocol No. 1 of the European Convention on Human Rights, which secured property rights.

=== Against Kurds ===
Mahmut Esat Bozkurt, a former Minister of Justice claimed in 1930 the superiority of the Turkish race over the Kurdish one, and permitted non-Turks only the right to be servants and slaves.

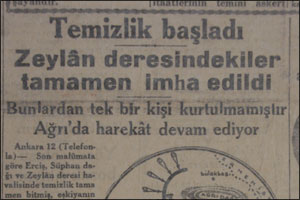
Headline of the daily Cumhuriyet dated July 13, 1930: Cleaning started, the ones at Zeylân valley were completely annihilated, None of them survived, operation at Ağrı is continuing. Ankara 12 (With telephone) ... According to latest information, the cleaning in districts of Erciş, Mount Süphan and Zeylân has completely finished ...

The Zilan massacre of 1930 was a massacre of the Kurdish residents of Northern Kurdistan during the Ararat rebellion in which 800–1500 armed men participated. According to the daily Cumhuriyet dated 16 July 1930, about 15,000 people were killed and Zilan River was filled with dead bodies as far as its mouth. On 31 August 1930, the daily Milliyet published the declaration of the Turkish prime minister İsmet İnönü: "Only the Turkish nation has the right to demand ethnic rights in this country. Any other element does not have such a right." and "They are Eastern Turkish who were deceived by unfounded propaganda and eventually lost their way."

Kurds have had a long history of discrimination and massacres which have been perpetrated against them by the Turkish government. One of the most significant is the Dersim massacre, where according to an official report of the Fourth General Inspectorate, 13,160 civilians were killed by the Turkish Army and 11,818 people were taken into exile, depopulating the province in 1937–38. According to the Dersimi, many tribesmen were shot dead after surrendering, and women and children were locked into haysheds which were then set on fire. David McDowall states that 40,000 people were killed while sources of the Kurdish Diaspora claim over 70,000 casualties.

In an attempt to deny their existence, the Turkish government categorized Kurds as "Mountain Turks" until 1991. Other than that, various historical Kurdish personalities were tried to be Turkified by claiming that there is no race called Kurdish and that the Kurds do not have a history. Since then, the Kurdish population of Turkey has long sought to have Kurdish included as a language of instruction in public schools as well as a subject. Several attempts at opening Kurdish instruction centers were stopped on technical grounds, such as wrong dimensions of doors. Turkish sources claimed that running Kurdish-language schools was wound up in 2004 because of 'an apparent lack of interest'. Even though Kurdish language schools have started to operate, many of them have been forced to shut down due to over-regulation by the state. Kurdish language institutes have been monitored under strict surveillance and bureaucratic pressure. Using Kurdish language as main education language is illegal in Turkey. It is accepted only as subject courses.

Kurdish is permitted as a subject in universities, some of those are only language courses while others are graduate or post-graduate Kurdish literature and language programs.

Due to the large number of Turkish Kurds, successive governments have viewed the expression of a Kurdish identity as a potential threat to Turkish unity, a feeling that has been compounded since the armed rebellion initiated by the PKK in 1984. One of the main accusations of cultural assimilation relates to the state's historic suppression of the Kurdish language. Kurdish publications created throughout the 1960s and 1970s were shut down under various legal pretexts. Following the military coup of 1980, the Kurdish language was officially prohibited in government institutions.

Banned Kurdish parties in Turkey
Party	Year banned
People's Labor Party (HEP)	1993
Freedom and Democracy Party (ÖZDEP)	1993
Democracy Party (DEP)	1994
People's Democracy Party (HADEP)	2003
Democratic Society Party (DTP)	2009

In April 2000, US Congressman Bob Filner spoke of a "cultural genocide", stressing that "a way of life known as Kurdish is disappearing at an alarming rate". Mark Levene suggests that the genocidal practices were not limited to cultural genocide, and that the events of the late 19th century continued until 1990. In 2019, Deutsche Welle reported that Kurds had been increasingly subject to violent hate crimes.

Certain academics have claimed that successive Turkish governments adopted a sustained genocide program against Kurds, aimed at their assimilation. The genocide hypothesis remains, however, a minority view among historians, and is not endorsed by any nation or major organisation. Desmond Fernandes, a senior lecturer at De Montfort University, breaks the policy of the Turkish authorities into the following categories:

1. Forced assimilation program, which involved, among other things, a ban of the Kurdish language, and the forced relocation of Kurds to non-Kurdish areas of Turkey.
2. The banning of any organizations opposed to category one.
3. The violent repression of any Kurdish resistance.

External videos
- Video of the TRT news station stopping the broadcast of a speech made in Kurdish by politician Ahmet Türk. Following the interruption, the newscaster said, "since no language other than Turkish can be used in the parliament meetings according to the constitution of the Turkish Republic and the Political Parties Law, we had to stop our broadcast. We apologize to our viewers for this and continue our broadcast with the next news item scheduled."

In January 2013, the Turkish parliament passed a law that permits use of the Kurdish language in the courts, albeit with restrictions. The law was passed by votes of the ruling AKP and the pro-Kurdish rights opposition party BDP, against criticism from the secularist CHP party and the nationalist MHP, with MHP and CHP deputies nearly coming to blows with BDP deputies over the law. In spite of their support in the parliament, the BDP was critical of the provision in the law that the defendants will pay for the translation fees and that the law applies only to spoken defense in court but not to a written defense or the pre-trial investigation. According to one source the law does not comply with EU standards. Deputy prime minister of Turkey Bekir Bozdağ replied to criticism of the law from both sides saying that the fees of defendants who does not speak Turkish will be paid by the state, while, those who speak Turkish yet prefer to speak in the court in another language will have to pay the fees themselves. European Commissioner for Enlargement Stefan Füle welcomed the new law.

In February 2013, Turkish prime minister Recep Tayyip Erdoğan said during a meeting with Muslim opinion leaders, that he has "positive views" about imams delivering sermons in Turkish, Kurdish or Arabic, according to the most widely spoken language among the mosque attendees. This move received support from Kurdish politicians and human rights groups.

=== Against other ethnic groups ===
Romani people, Domari, Abdals and Lom, have many problems in everyday life, e.g., in jobs, professions, as well as the report of mysterious death of a young east thracian Turkish Roma soldier in May 2021, who served his military service in Itlib, because he was a Rom, exclusion from corona aid 2020, exclusion from earthquake aid 2023, Domari Refugees of the Syrian civil war in Turkey, have big problems too. Expelled from places there live since century like Sulukule in 2007 and Bayramiç in 1970. Due to exclusion, many of this Groups deny their gypsy origins as much as possible and pretend to be Turks or Turkmen.

== Religious-based ==
=== Against Alevis ===
Alevis in Turkey have experienced systemic religious discrimination since the early Republican era, particularly in access to education, and political representation. Although Cemevi are the main places of worship for Alevis, Turkey does not recognized them as official places of worship; the European Court of Human Rights ruled on 26 April 2016 that this denial violated the provisions on the right to religion and the prohibition of discrimination.

The history of organized violence against Alevis includes the Dersim massacre (1937–1938), and pogroms such as the Malatya massacre (1978), Maraş massacre (1978), and the Sivas massacre (1993), some of those pogroms took place with the support of the military and ultra-nationalist groups.

=== Against Christians ===
Multiple scholars have argued that the establishment of Turkey combined the religious hierarchies of the Ottoman millet system with ethnic Turkish nationalism and colonial practices, creating a three-tiered hierarchy of citizenship with Christians and Jews at the bottom.

These scholars cite legislation and administrative practices that have excluded Christians from certain parliamentary elections, confiscated Christian properties, restricted the residence and movements of Christians, classified and surveilled citizens according to ethnic ancestry. Kılıçdağı emphasizes that these practices constituted institutionalized discrimination embedded in laws, decrees, and administrative directives rather than isolated incidents of prejudice, citing parliamentary proceedings revealing deliberate efforts to deny Christian citizens restitution for confiscated property.

Christians in Turkey continue to experience discrimination. Research by Bahar Tanyas documents everyday ostracism, hostility, pressure to conceal religious identities, and the treatment of Christian youth as outsiders in their own country.

A 2025 country report by Austria's Federal Office for Immigration and Asylum similarly describes structural discrimination against Christians, including barriers to civil-service employment, advancement in the military, and recruitment in the private sector. It also identifies religious nationalism and the association of Turkish identity with Islam as contributing to the perception of Christians and converts as disloyal or foreign.

The European Commission against Racism and Intolerance (ECRI) has documented difficulties obtaining legal recognition, registering church property, and securing construction permits for Protestant places of worship, as well as the exclusion of foreign Protestant clergy through national-security designations. The United States Commission on International Religious Freedom has likewise criticized restrictions on Christian congregations, clergy training, and access to places of worship, while identifying broader institutional advantages afforded to Sunni Islam. In February 2026, the European Parliament condemned the use of national-security measures that it reported had resulted in at least 300 foreign Christian pastors, missionaries, and family members being deported or denied re-entry without adequate evidence or effective appeal. Beyond these institutional restrictions, the Organization for Security and Co-operation in Europe documented reports of anti-Christian incidents in 2025, including threats to kill Protestant pastors and burn down churches.

=== Against Jews ===
In the 1930s, groups publishing antisemitic journals were formed. Journalist Cevat Rıfat Atilhan published a journal in İzmir called Anadolu and which contained antisemitic writing. When the publication was outlawed, Atilhan went to Germany and was entertained by Julius Streicher for months. In Der Stürmer, a publication by Streicher, a large article was published about Cevat Rifat Atilhan on 18 August 1934. Upon returning to Turkey, Atilhan started the journal Milli İnkılap which was very similar to Der Stürmer. Consequently, it is argued that much of the antisemitic theories in Turkey stem from much of the opinions and material that Atilhan took from Germany.

The Elza Niego affair was an event regarding the murder of a Jewish girl in Turkey named Elza Niego in 1927. During the funeral, a demonstration was held in opposition of the Turkish government which created an antisemitic reaction in the Turkish press. Nine protestors were immediately arrested under the charge of offending "Turkishness".

The 1934 Resettlement Law was a policy adopted by the Turkish government which set forth the basic principles of immigration. Although the Law on Settlement was expected to operate as an instrument for Turkifying the mass of non-Turkish speaking citizens, it immediately emerged as a piece of legislation which sparked riots against non-Muslims, as evidenced in the 1934 Thrace pogroms against Jews in the immediate aftermath of the law's passage. With the law being issued on 14 June 1934, the Thrace pogroms began just over a fortnight later, on 3 July. The incidents seeking to force out the region's non-Muslim residents first began in Çanakkale, where Jews received unsigned letters telling them to leave the city, and then escalated into an antisemitic campaign involving economic boycotts and verbal assaults as well as physical violence against the Jews living in the various provinces of Thrace. It is estimated that out of a total 15,000–20,000 Jews living in the region, more than half fled to Istanbul during and after the incidents.

The Neve Shalom Synagogue in Istanbul has been attacked three times. First on 6 September 1986, Arab militants killed 22 Jewish worshippers and wounded 6 during Shabbat services at Neve Shalom. This attack was blamed on the Palestinian militant Abu Nidal. The Synagogue was hit again during the 2003 Istanbul bombings alongside the Beth Israel Synagogue, killing 20 and injuring over 300 people, both Jews and Muslims alike. Even though a local Turkish militant group, the Great Eastern Islamic Raiders' Front, claimed responsibility for the attacks, police claimed the bombings were "too sophisticated to have been carried out by that group", with a senior Israeli government source saying: "the attack must have been at least coordinated with international terror organizations".

In the aftermath of the 2013 Gezi Park protests, Turkey's Deputy Prime Minister Beşir Atalay attributed the protests to external powers and the "Jewish diaspora".

In 2015, an Erdogan-affiliated news channel broadcast a two-hour documentary titled "The Mastermind" (a term which Erdogan himself had introduced to the public some months earlier), which forcefully suggested that it were "the mind of the Jews" that "rules the world, burns, destroys, starves, wages wars, organizes revolutions and coups, and establishes states within states." According to the Anti-Defamation League 71% of Turkish adults "harbor anti-Semitic views".

== Nationality-based ==
=== Against Afghans ===
Afghan refugees and migrants have accused Turkish security personnel of violent attacks, including lethal force against them for attempting to enter the country by shooting at them. Turkish border guards have been accused of shooting and killing Afghans attempting to enter the country. Meanwhile, Turkish immigration officials have continued their efforts to deport millions of Afghan migrants living in the country.

A 2023 research report published by a team of Turkish scholars explained the affiliation of Afghan migrants with crime in the country and reasons for public sentiments rising against them. A video surfaced online showing Turkish ultra-nationalists beating an Afghan man and was circulated on social media.

=== Against Americans ===
Anti-American sentiment and related discriminatory incidents in Turkey have occurred intermittently, often shaped by political tensions and rising Turkish nationalism. In November 2014, a group of Turkish nationalists affiliated with the Youth Union of Turkey (TGB) assaulted three U.S. Navy sailors in Istanbul. The assailants attempted to place sacks over the sailors’ heads. The attack was widely publicized and criticized, with both Turkish and American officials stressing that such actions endangered diplomatic and military cooperation.

Tensions resurfaced in September 2024 when two U.S. Marines from the USS Wasp were assaulted in the city of Izmir, again by members of the TGB. The attackers targeted the servicemen in broad daylight, attempting to sack their heads while chanting "Yankee, go home." Videos of the incident quickly circulated online, prompting condemnation from the U.S. National Security Council and leading to the detention of 15 suspects by Turkish authorities. The event revived concerns about the security of American personnel stationed in or visiting Turkey.

=== Against Iranians ===
According to a 2013 survey, 75% of Turks look at Iran unfavorably. In some Turkish political discourses, Iran is disparaged as the "Persian Satan", as a form of political xenophobia against Iranian culture and Iran regional politics.

Political scientist Shireen Hunter writes that there are two significant groups in Turkey that are hostile towards Iran: "the military establishment and the ultra-Kemalist elite" and the "ultranationalists with pan-Turkist aspirations" (such as the Grey Wolves). Canadian author Kaveh Farrokh also suggests that pan-Turkist groups (the Grey Wolves in particular) have encouraged anti-Iranian sentiments.

== Race-based ==
=== Against Africans ===
Most modern historians estimate that roughly 2 to 3 million Africans were enslaved within Ottoman domains between the 15th and late 19th centuries by Ottoman Turks. Sociologists such as Doğuş Şimşek strongly stress that this misperception resulted from the fact that Africans in Turkey often live in the shadows and Afro-Turks, the historical black population of Turkey, are mostly confined to tiny communities in Western Turkey.

In April 1992, after Nelson Mandela declined Turkey’s Atatürk International Peace Prize in protest of Ankara’s treatment of its Kurdish minority, segments of the Turkish press responded with branding him "Ugly African" (Turkish: Çirkin Afrikalı) and labeling him a "terrorist Mandela" in front‐page headlines. However, in 1999, Mandela reversed his decision and accepted the award.

A 2001 Human Right Association (HRA) inquiry found that over 205 Africans were detained in Istanbul based solely on skin colour, held in inhuman conditions without food or water, and then forcibly expelled to the Greece border zone, where some died or were raped. African immigrants, whose numbers were estimated to be 150,000 as of 2018 have reported to experience sexual abuse and discrimination based on racial grounds regularly in Turkey. In July 2023, amateur videos circulated showing Turkish police officers violently stopping, questioning, and physically assaulting African migrants in central Istanbul. A Senegalese man seen in a video being slapped by a Turkish police officer, said he was visiting Turkey legally.

In March 2024, a series of posts on an Instagram account called "Karabük University Confessions" falsely claimed that African students in Karabük University had infected Turkish classmates with HIV and HPV after sexual encounters, triggering widespread racist backlash on social media. The Karabük Provincial Health Directorate swiftly issued a statement on 23 March 2024, declaring that there had been no recent hospital admissions for HIV or HPV in the province and that case numbers remained stable, effectively debunking the rumors. African student associations, representing nearly 6,000 students from 35 African countries at Karabük University, reported that the false disease allegations exacerbated existing xenophobia, leading to heightened discrimination and verbal harassment on campus.

== Intra-Turkish discrimination ==
In Turkey, one common habit is to assume one's ethnicity from the place of origin, often based on an inaccurate perception of the demographics of a specific area. Likewise, ethnic Turks who come from eastern parts of the country can be discriminated against based on the assumption that they are Kurds, even though they are not. Many Syrian Turkmen who took refuge in the country face racism as other Syrian refugees.

Discrimination against Turks whom are of religious sects besides the Sunni majority such as Alevis, Shias and other non-Sunni Turks is also widely reported. Turkish scholars have also illustrated the sub-cultural prejudices against other Turks. They have argued the so-called White Turks hold racist-like intent towards the so-called Black Turks because of sub-cultural differences. Throughout the Turkish Republic’s history, Kemalist Turks have systematically marginalized non-Kemalist Turks through a range of state policies and social practices. Kemalist Turk enforcement of laïcité included a headscarf ban in universities, public-sector employment, and parliament until 2013, ostracizing devout Turkish Muslim women from education and the professional sphere.

== See also ==
- Human rights in Turkey
- Minorities in Turkey
- Anti-Turkish sentiment
- Religious nationalism
- Environmental racism in Turkey
- Turkish textbook controversies
- The Twenty Classes
