= Tanyu =

Tanyu may refer to:

- Tanyu Kiryakov, Bulgarian pistol shooter
- Hikmet Tanyu, Turkish scientist
- Tan Yu, a Chinese businessman
- Tanyu (town), in Zhenlai County, Jilin, China
