= Malatya massacre =

1978 massacre in Malatya, Turkey

The Malatya Massacre was an outbreak of anti-Alevi violence that took place in Malatya, Turkey, on 17 April 1978. The massacre was instigated by the murder of then-mayor Hamit Fendoğlu, after which Sunni Islamist groups entered the Alevi and left-wing areas of the city and committed violent acts.

== Background ==
After the 1973 Turkish parliamentary general elections, the Republican People's Party (CHP) and the National Salvation Party (MSP) were the largest parties in Malatya. The MSP, an Islamist party, received the support of Sunni and right-wing sections; the CHP was generally supported by Alevi and left-wing sections. In this context, the separation of the right and left in the city began to increase. Left-wing organizations began to be established and widespread, and right-wing associations such as Associations for Komünizmle Mücadele Dernekleri, Grey Wolves, and Akıncılar Derneği grew. This polarization was also observed in the 1977 Turkish general elections, in which the MSP and the Nationalist Movement Party received significantly more votes than in previous years.

In the period from 1968 to the massacre, there was an increasing trend of unrest and violence. Incidents included the murder of Kemal Abbas Altunkaş in Malatya (1968), the Hekimhan Incident (1968), the 2 February Meeting (1975), the 15–16 February Incidents (1975) and the Akçadağ Teachers' School Incident (1975).

== Massacre ==
=== Murder of Hamit Fendoğlu ===
The events on 17 April 1978 began when a bomb exploded in the house of mayor Hamit Fendoğlu, killing him, his daughter-in-law, and two grandchildren. The bomb was inside a package that had been sent from Ankara on 7 April 1978. Several other bomb packages were sent on the same day. There was not clear consensus about the organization that sent the bomb, but it was announced in the days following the incident that it could have only been produced at the Ankara Nuclear Research Center. Several people working at the facility were detained, along with the former president of the Grey Wolves, Muharrem Şemsek. Those detained were later released. Members of MSP denied allegations that the bomb was sent by a right-wing group, instead claiming that a communist group sent it. The Ortadoğu Gazetesi falsely claimed that they seized a tape which stated that the assassination was "the work of leftists and separatists collaborating with them".

=== Retaliation ===
Following the assassination, houses belonging to Alevi practitioners were spray-painted with red X marks. In the evening, attacks against Alevis in the city began and continued until 20 April. Eight people were killed, several hundred were injured, and nearly a thousand buildings were destroyed. Following the outbreak of violence, thousands of Alevis were forced to leave the city.

== See also ==
- List of massacres in Turkey
- Xenophobia and discrimination in Turkey
- Constantinople pogroms
