= Racism-Turanism trials =

Trials in Turkey

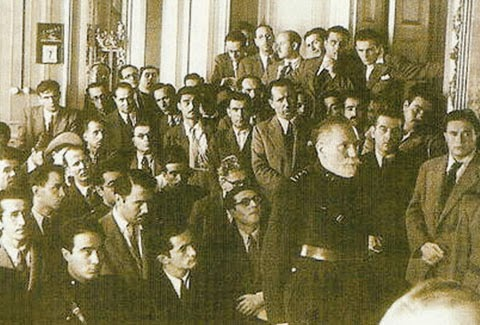
Defendants at the Racism-Turanism trial

The Racism-Turanism trials (Turkish: Irkçılık-Turancılık Davası) were a series of legal prosecutions of defendants accused of spreading racist and pan-Turkist ideologies and attempting a coup on the Turkish government. The trials lasted between May 1944 and March 1947, and were triggered by nationalist demonstrations on 3 May 1944 in support of Nihal Atsız who was on trial against Sabahattin Ali for defamation.

== Pre-trial ==
On the 3 May 1944 a rally by racists and Turanists in support of Nihal Atsız with thousands of participants took place. The protestors shortly managed to occupy the courthouse and shout slogans against the government. In reaction to the rallies on 3 May 1944, from 9 May onwards 47 people were detained, most of them known Pan-Turkists like Nihal Atsız. Reha Oğuz Türkkan was arrested on 10 May and Atsız's brother Nejdet Sançar on 14 May in Balıkesir. Atsız's wife Bedriye was also arrested on 16 May. Several Turkish journalists supported the Turkish government and blamed the people attending the manifestations of being racists and Turanists. The Turkish President İsmet İnönü took the lead in the political sphere during a speech in the Ankara Stadium in which he proclaimed that Turkey was a nationalist country, but deemed Turanism of causing hostilities with its neighboring countries. Journalists Hüseyin Cahit Yalçın and Mehmet Emin Erişirgil and other Turkish nationalists followed suit and also criticized the imprisoned Turkists.

== Trial ==
The Racism-Turanism trial against twenty-three defendants started on the 7 September 1944. Besides those mentioned above, notable defendants included Zeki Velidi Togan, Hikmet Tanyu, Alparslan Türkeş and Orhan Şaik Gökyay.

=== Arguments by the prosecution ===
The prosecution attempted to portray the prominent racist ideologue Atsız as not being of Turkish stock himself, while Togan and Türkkan were accused of having been involved in the secret organization Gürem (Note: A nonexistent organization "led" by fictitious Avni Motun.) allegedly established in 1941 in order to support an eventual alliance with Nazi Germany and liberate the Turkic people in the Soviet Union. The indictment accused the defendants of having wanted to overthrow the acting Turkish government.

=== Arguments by the defendants ===
The defendants put forward several arguments. Türkkan argued that he only followed what the Turkish government also demanded, because Kurdish and Greek nationalists were denied their right of being judges, and several governmental institutions were only open to Turks; therefore, Türkkan claimed, the Turkish government was also propagating racist policies. Türkeş denied being a racist but defended the right of being a Turkish nationalist and believed in the martial superiority of the Turks as taught by Mustafa Kemal Atatürk and in the Turkish military institutions. Asked whether he acknowledged the existence of other ethnicities who claimed to be Turks, Türkeş confirmed it, but demanded their complete Turkification. Türkeş deemed the trial as an attack against Turkism and argued that racism was a part of Turkish politics since the time Atatürk was Turkey's president. When Sançar was asked about his principles of racism, he replied that partial Turks who serve the Turkish nation in considerable manner, would be counted as Turks and gave the Ottoman Sultan Bayezid I as an example. When Atsız was asked the same, he gave similar answers as well. He said finding Turkishness in three generations is a scientific method, but regarded partial Turks who regard themselves as Turks as such. He said government members should be of Turkish origin to avoid harm to the nation.

=== Torture ===
The defendants were tortured before the trials began. The torture included hitting, foot whipping, confining defendants to dirty underground cells, and closing defendants to illuminated coffin-like cells. Zeki Velidi Togan was forced to starve for two days, Nejdet Sançar was held in a cell with no windows or holes for 22 days, Nihal Atsız was held in a dirty underground cell for 7 days. Many defendants, including Reha Oğuz Türkkan, Alparslan Türkeş, Hamza Sadi Özbek, Orhan Şaik Gökyay and others, were closed to coffin-like cells (tabutluk). While Fehiman Altan and the judge were discussing the torture, the general notice responded "We brought them not as guests; but as traitors, murderers, villains who want to overthrow the government. We wouldn't place them in the Pera Palace Hotel. We would suspect about spying and everything if necessary. They didn't show up here as a presidential candidate. So they would pass everything and any kind of persecution against them was permissible."

=== Verdicts ===
On 29 March 1945, the verdict was announced.

- Zeki Velidi Togan was sentenced to 10 years in prison, 4 years of internal exile in Adapazarı
- Hüseyin Nihal Atsız was sentenced to 6 years, 6 months and 15 days in prison, 3 years of internal exile in Adana
- Reha Oğuz Türkkan was sentenced to 5 years and 10 months in prison, 2 years of internal exile in Diyarbakır
- Cihat Savaş Fer was sentenced to 4 years in prison, 1,5 years of internal exile in Uşak
- Nurullah Barıman was sentenced to 4 years in prison, 1,5 years of internal exile in Kırşehir
- Nejdet Sançar was given 1 year and 2 months in prison
- Fethi Tevetoğlu was given 11 months and 20 days in prison
- Cebbar Şenel was given 11 months in prison
- Cemal Oğuz Öcal was given 11 months in prison
- Alparslan Türkeş was given 9 months and 10 days in prison

Other defendants received an amnesty.

The defendants appealed the verdict, pointing out they were victims of torture while in prison. The Military Court of Cassation acquitted them and ordered their release. The Military Court of Appeals objected and ordered a retrial, which began on 26 October 1945. On 31 March 1947 all the defendants were acquitted because the Istanbul Martial Law Court argued there was no evidence for an attempt to overthrow the government; further, since the Turkish Settlement Law included notions of those who belong to the Turkish race and those who do not, racism was not contrary to the Turkish Constitution.

== Aftermath ==
During the retrial, Kenan Öner, lawyer for the defendants, accused Hasan Âli Yücel of protecting communists, specifically in the Ministry of National Education. Yücel sued Öner and a case was opened between them, in which the defendants of the Racism-Turanism trials and many other nationalists were witnesses. Yücel argued he never supported communists and all the witnesses were manipulated by Atsız. Atsız responded harshly; arguing it was Yücel's fault if every witness thinks similarly about him, stating Yücel appointed many communists to important academic positions and he made things too personal with Atsız. Öner was found innocent on 19 November 1947, but after a series of retrials, since Öner's death in March 1949, other defendant Cemalettin Saracoğlu was given a little punishment, closing the case.

During the Öner-Yücel trial, witnesses testified about the tortures. Hikmet Tanyu released a little article on the tortures they faced and after his efforts, a case was opened against the prosecutor Kazım Alöç, martial law commander Sabit Noyan, İstanbul's security director Ahmet Demir, 1st branch manager of security Sait Koçak and many others. However, after a general amnesty was declared in the Democratic Party government, all of them were released.

== Legacy ==
Türkkan, Atsız, Togan, Sançar and others, who at the time were imprisoned in the Tophane Military prison, held a reunion on the 3 May 1945 to remember the demonstrations in support of Atsız. Since, the 3 May is celebrated as Turkism Day by Turkish nationalists.
