= Nihal Atsız =

Turkish ultranationalist writer, novelist, and poet (1905–1975)

Nihâl Atsız
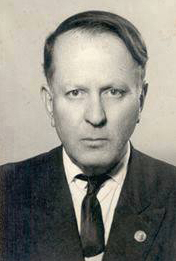
- Born: Mehmet Nail oğlu Hüseyin Nihâl; January 12, 1905; Kadıköy, Istanbul, Ottoman Empire
- Died: December 11, 1975 (aged 70); İçerenköy, Istanbul, Turkey
- Resting place: Karacaahmet Cemetery, Istanbul
- Education: Istanbul High School; Istanbul University
- Occupations: Writer; novelist; poet
- Spouses: Mehpare Hanım (m. 1931; div. 1935); Bedriye Atsız (m. 1936)
- Children: 3 (1 adopted)
- Relatives: Rıza Nur (godfather); Necdet Sançar (younger brother)
- Writing career
- Notable works: Bozkurtların Ölümü (Death of the Grey Wolves); Deli Kurt (Mad Wolf)

Signature
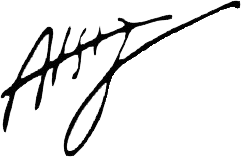

Hüseyin Nihâl Atsız (January 12, 1905 – December 11, 1975) was a prominent Turkish ultranationalist writer, novelist, and poet. Atsız self-identified as Pan-Turkist, Turanist, (Note: He used the word Turanism as a synonym of Pan-Turkism and didn't have the ideology of uniting all Ural-Altaic peoples.) and was the ideologue of Atsızism. He was the author of over 30 books and numerous articles and was in strong opposition to the government of İsmet İnönü, which he criticized for co-operating with the communists. He was accused of being a sympathizer of Nazi Germany and plotting to overthrow the Turkish government.

Initially, he was an ardent Muslim that opposed atheism, condemned communism, defended the existence of God, and said that morality was very important for society. He later became a critic of Islam, calling it "a religion created by Arabs, for Arabs". Despite his criticisms of religion, Atsız had a turbulent relationship with Islam. Atsız defined Islam as the national religion of the Turks. He said that it should be respected and said that religion was an indispensable part of a nation. He also harshly criticized the practices of Kemalism that disturbed religious Turks. When asked about one of his favorite poets, Mehmet Akif Ersoy, who defended the ideology of "Islamism", he praised Islamism and said that it was the national ideal of the Ottoman Turks. When Atsız died, his coffin was brought to the mosque and a religious ceremony was held and funeral prayers were performed.

== Personal life ==
Nihâl Atsız was born on January 12, 1905, at Kadıköy, Istanbul. His father was navy commander Mehmet Nail Bey, from the Çiftçioğlu family of Torul, Gümüşhane; and his mother was Fatma Zehra, daughter of navy commander Osman Fevzi Bey, from the Kadıoğlu family of Trabzon. Atsız had two sons from his second wife Bedriye Atsız, whom he married in 1935. They were Yağmur Atsız, a left-wing journalist and writer, and Dr. Buğra Atsız, and academician and nationalist writer; he also had an adopted daughter: Kaniye Atsız. They divorced in 1975. Atsız had a younger brother, Nejdet Sançar, also a prominent personality of the pan-Turkist ideology. The surname he adopted following the enforcement of the Surname Law by Atatürk means 'nameless' or "one who has not yet made himself a name," for in Old Turkic Culture, you should be successful to deserve a name. Atsız was also the name of at least two Seljuk emirs, Atsiz (1098 – 1156) and Atsiz ibn Uwaq (died 1078 or 1079).

Atsız's godfather is Turkish politician and statesman Dr. Rıza Nur, who was also a Turkish nationalist. He also had a younger brother named Necdet Sançar. His brother was also a staunch Turkish nationalist, and they published many magazines and books together. The death of his brother Necdet Sançar affected Atsız greatly, and he himself died 10 months after his brother's death.

== Education and professional life ==
He attended two French (one of them was in Egypt), one German and one Turkish secondary schools and Kadıköy High School before he began to study at the Military School of Medicine in 1922 but was expelled due to his ultra-nationalist views and activities as he declined to salute an officer of Arab origin who was of a superior rank than his in 1925. He then began to study at the Teachers College in Istanbul and the Istanbul University School of Literature and graduated from both in 1930. Following this he became assistant to Professor Fuat Köprülü at the Istanbul University. He challenged the Turkish History Thesis and following this incident he was dismissed from the university in 1932. After he worked in high schools in Malatya and Edirne as a teacher but due to his persistent challenge of the Turkish History Thesis he often faced difficulties in his career. Following his imprisonment due to the Racism-Turanism Trials in 1944–1945 he wasn't rehired as a teacher and only in 1949 was he employed at the Süleymaniye Library. He returned to teaching for several years, ultimately to return the Library in 1952. He was active there until 1969. After his retirement in 1969 he kept publishing Ötüken.

== Politics ==
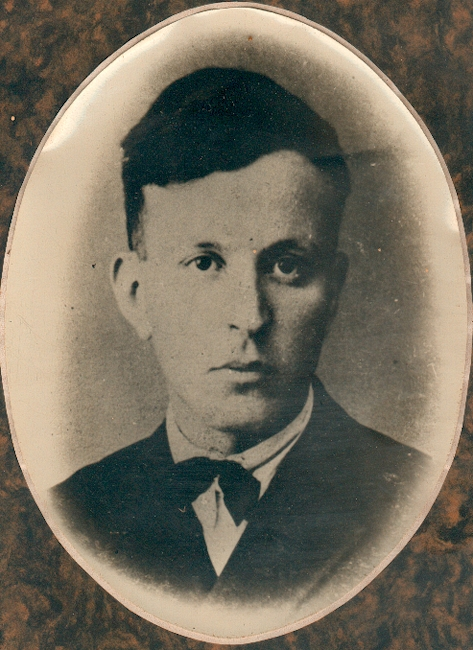
Early portrait

Atsız was an important ideologue who lived during the early years of the Republic of Turkey. He was initially against Atatürk's leadership, condemned Turkey's foreign policy, and particularly the appeasement policy vis-a-vis the Soviet Union. Most importantly, his supporters ridiculed Kemalist attempts at connecting Turks with early Anatolian and Mesopotamian civilizations in the Atatürk era. His views on Atatürk became more positive after the military coup against the Democrat Party in 1960 and he stressed Atatürk's nationalism in his writings. By the Justice Party, he was offered to be candidate for parliamentary election in 1961 for Kütahya, but he did not accept.

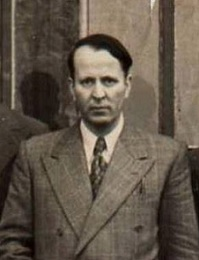
Nihâl Atsız in the 1930s

He was a staunch Turanist, Pan-Turkist, and racist. He wrote that the Kipchaks in Lithuania and Kirghiz are from the same blood and therefore Turks, but "alien people" living in Turkey like Jews or Negroes are not Turks even if they speak Turkish. Atsız especially and namely hated Arabs, Armenians, Kurds, Greeks, Persians, Han Chinese, Bulgarians, Serbs, Croats, Bosniaks, Romanians, Europeans, Blacks, Japanese, Jews, Pashtuns, Americans, Circassians, Chechens, Abazins, Albanians, Pomaks, Laz, Lezgins, and Georgians, considering them all as being enemies of the Turks.

Nihal Atsiz specifically hated the Nurism and referred to Nurists as "a foolish herd shepherded by an ignorant Kurd called Said-i Nursi" and "a bunch of losers, who get together to read the books Said-i Nursi wrote in his incomprehensible Kurdish-Turkish, as if they are studying atomic physics or a theorem by Einstein."

Kemalism, which had been condemned so harshly in his novel "Dalkavuklar Gecesi" (The Night of the Sycophants) is the founding ideology of the Republic of Turkey. The nature and the type of Atatürk's nationalism during the Early Republican Period (1923–50) since 1923 have interpreted Turkish identity under the guiding light of constitutional principles which equated ‘Turkishness’ with being a Turkish citizen. Identifying all Turkish citizens as Turks proper, the three constitutions of the Republican Era were completely and positively blind to ethnic, and religious differences between Turkish citizens and disassociated ‘Turkishness’ from its popular meaning: that is, the name of an ethnic group. Supporters of this view argue that Republican statesmen rejected the German model of ethnic nationalism and emulated the French model of civic nationalism by reducing ‘Turkishness’ to a legal category only. In other words, citizens of Turkey who happened to be of Kurdish, Greek, Armenian, Jewish or Assyrian descent had only to accept a plebiscite, according to this view, to take advantage of the opportunity of Turkification, as far as their citizenship status was concerned, and gaining full equality with ethnic Turks, provided that they remained faithful to their side of the bargain.

In 1952 together with his family and close friends, Atsız cleaned the tomb of Fatih Sultan Mehmet, which had been closed and neglected by the Kemalist CHP until then. During this period, Atsız worked on the occasion of the 500th anniversary celebrations of the Conquest of Istanbul by the Turks. He opposed the conversion of Hagia Sophia into a museum and demanded that it be converted back into a mosque. He would even say, If I were to come to this world again, I would want to be the Imam of Hagia Sophia. President Erdoğan repeated these words of Atsız at the ceremony of converting Hagia Sophia back into a mosque and referred to him as a national poet and historian.

Atsız was a staunch anti-Semite. He hated Jews. He said that Jews stabbed the Ottoman Army in the back on the Palestine Front in World War I and described Jews as the fifth column. He also hated Dönmeh from Salonika. He was disturbed by the Arabs' repeated defeats in the Arab–Israeli conflict and in one of his articles he suggested that Turks and Arabs form a federation, fight against Jews and destroy Israel.

== Legal prosecution ==
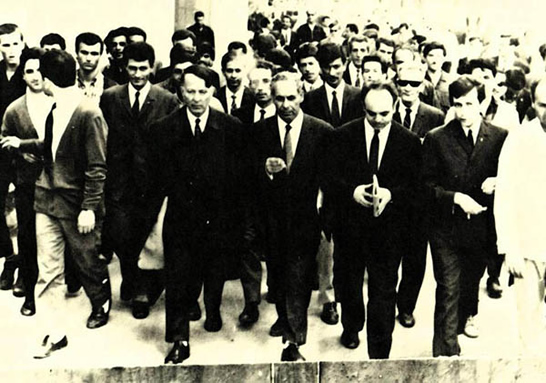
Atsız goes to trial

Atsız was prosecuted twice in 1944. Once he was prosecuted on the initiative of Sabahattin Ali for accusing him (and 3 other communists) of being a traitor and warning Prime Minister Şükrü Saracoğlu about them, who established important positions in high schools and universities, which Atsız believed was with the help of the Minister of National Education. Atsız knew Ali from before as they shared a room with him in the 1920s, when Sabahattin Ali was a nationalist. He was given a sentence of 6 months in the trial against Sabahattin Ali, which was later reduced to a suspended sentence of 4 months. During the Atsız-Ali trial, rallies by adherents to the political right-wing spectrum in support of Atsız were held on both court hearings on the 26 April and 3 May 1944. Many of the attendants of these rallies were arrested and later prosecuted during the so-called Racism Turanism trial. During this trial Atsız and 22 others, amongst them also Reha Oğuz Türkkan, Alparslan Türkeş, were prosecuted for inciting racism and Turanism. He first got sentenced to 6 years and 6 months in prison, after which the sentence was lowered to 1 year and 6 months and at the end he (along with the other nationalists) received an amnesty. In 1973, despite his health problems, he received a prison sentence of 15 months because of his writings against Kurdish separatists, after 6 years of trials. He wrote that Kurds should leave Turkey (if they insist on keeping the pro-Kurdish propaganda) and learn from the Armenians what happens to the people who challenge the Turkish nation. Many people; including mayors, journalists, writers, university lecturers and students; requested president Fahri Korutürk to release Atsız from prison. After 2 1/2 months, he was pardoned.

== Controversies ==
In the Orhun, Atsız wrote in support for the establishment of a Greater Turkish Empire spanning from the Mediterranean Sea to the Pacific Ocean. Corry Guttstadt mentioned: "His Turkism was based on ties of blood and race; he advocated a return to pre-Islamic Turkish beliefs."

According to Jacob M. Landau, he was a sympathizer of the Nazi government. Landau in his book Exploring Ottoman and Turkish History states: "Atsiz was a great admirer of the race theories of Nazi Germany, expressing some of them repeatedly in his own works during the 1930s and 1940s (with the Turks labelled as the 'master race'). His articles insisted, again and again, that Pan-Turkism could – and should – be achieved by war." Aside from favoring Nazi Germany for their war with Soviet Union, he denied these claims as he started to publish his ideas even before Hitler was well-known in Turkey.

== Legacy ==
During his lifetime, many scholars and authors who were influenced by Atsız decided to give a "present" to him by writing an honorary book. However, he died before receiving the present, which was published in 1976.

Nineteen young academicians and authors, assembled under a nationalist association "Siyah Beyaz Kültür ve Sanat Platformu", published a book on him, "Vaktiyle Bir Atsız Varmış", which consisted of articles and comparative studies on his works, life and views. In the Maltepe district in Istanbul, a park is named after him.

=== Political groups ===
In Turkey in 2012 a nationalist group calling itself the Atsız Youth emerged, participating in anti-Armenian demonstrations in Istanbul, carrying banners stating "You are all Armenians, You are all bastards", in response to the slogan "We are all Hrant Dink, We are all Armenians". In February 2015, in response to the 100th anniversary of the Armenian genocide, Anti-Armenian banners of the Atsız Youth appeared in cities around Turkey, including banners in İstanbul condemning events of the First Nagorno-Karabakh War 1992 which they partisanly characterized as "Khojaly Genocide", and a banner in Muğla proclaiming "We celebrate the 100th anniversary of our country being cleared of Armenians".

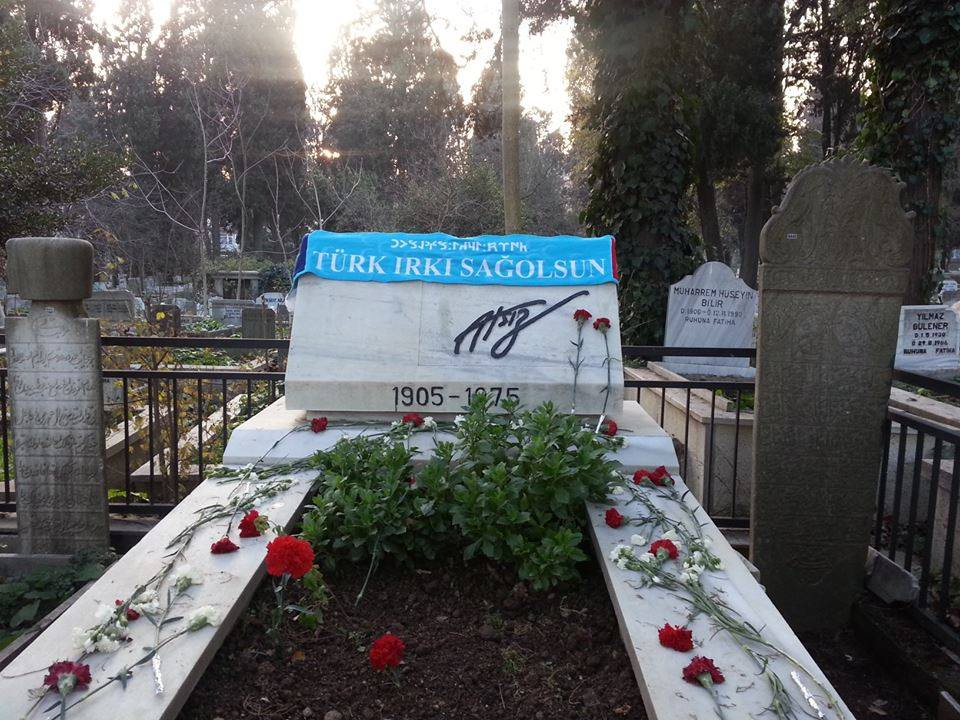
The grave of Nihal Atsız

=== Turkism Day ===
On the 3 May 1945, Atsız, Alparslan Türkeş, Reha Oğuz Türkkan, Nejdet Sançar and others, all imprisoned in the Tophane military prison, held a meeting in memory of the rallies held on the 3 May 1944 in support of Atsız during the trial between Atsız and Sabahattin Ali. This meeting was the beginning of the annual celebrations of the Turkism Day.

== Literary work ==
His essays about history are gathered and published as a book under the name of Türk Tarihinde Meseleler (Issues in Turkic History). He also served as a literature teacher for a number of years. During his lifetime he wrote thirty-eight poems, six novels.

=== Magazines ===
Atsız published several academic essays about Ottoman literature and history. He began to publish magazines in 1931, which he kept doing until 1975. Atsız Mecmua was the first Pan-Turk magazine, which was published from 15 May 1931 to 25 September 1932. He also published Orhun from 1933 to 1934 and again from 1943 to 1944. Orkun, as a successor of Orhun, was first published in 1950 and later in 1962-63. His last magazine Ötüken was published from 1964 to 1975.

=== Poetry and novels ===
During his lifetime he wrote thirty-eight poems and six novels. A famous politicised novel of his was Dalkavuklar Gecesi (The Night of the Sycophants), a historical allegory and critique of Kemalism. Published in 1941, it tells the story of political corruption during the Hittite era, but is actually referring (in a roman a clef fashion) to the injustices and arbitrariness of Atatürk's rule during the 1930s, especially the Turkish History Thesis, and the sycophants around him.

His historical epic novel Bozkurtların Ölümü (Death of the Grey Wolves) is one of the most popular historical novels in Turkish literature. The book concerns the last days of the first Gök Türk Empire and the impossible rebellion of Prince Kür-Şad and his forty warriors against the Chinese invaders, referring to the attempt to kidnap the Chinese emperor by Ashina Jiesheshuai in 639. His original Turkic name is unknown, Kürşad is a made-up name by Atsız. Its sequel Bozkurtlar Diriliyor (Revival of the Grey Wolves) tells the story of Urungu (the unknown son of Kür-Şad) and the beginning of the second Gök Türk Empire. Both novels were very popular in the Turkish society. İsmet Hürmüzlü wrote a theater play on the subject and passages of the books were an optional part in literary classes.

His third novel, Deli Kurt (Mad Wolf), is about the mystic romance between a Sipahi warrior (who was actually an unknown member of the Ottoman dynasty) and a mysterious shamanist nomad woman in the early Ottoman Empire.

Atsız wrote a satirical political comedy about the İnönü government, Z Vitamini (Vitamin Z), which was about a fictional special vitamin which gives immortality to the dictator and his government. It was published in 1959 containing eleven pages.

His last novel, Ruh Adam (Soul Man), is quite a complex psychological novel. The book has a spiritual and mystical atmosphere, full with surrealistic, allegorical figures such as Yek (who symbolizes Satan) and Captain Şeref (who symbolizes Honour). It has a complex story, which is generally about the forbidden platonic love affair between an alcoholic ex-army officer and a diabolical, mysterious young high school student. The plot develops on the reincarnation of two lovers, which was a warrior banned from the army because of his love to the girl was greater than his love to his country in ancient nomad times. It was inspired by Atsız's own life.

His poems are in the style of Pre-Islamic literature and his common themes are idealism, honour, forbidden love, war and history. His complete poetic works (except for a few) have been published under the name of Yolların Sonu ("End of Roads").

== Works ==
=== Novels ===
- Dalkavuklar Gecesi (The Night of the Sycophants), İstanbul 1941. ISBN 978-975-437-804-7
- Bozkurtların Ölümü (Death of the Grey Wolves), İstanbul 1946. ISBN 978-975-437-800-9
- Bozkurtlar Diriliyor (Revival of the Grey Wolves), İstanbul 1949. ISBN 978-975-437-800-9
- Deli Kurt (Mad Wolf), İstanbul 1958. ISBN 978-975-437-801-6
- Z Vitamini (Vitamin Z), İstanbul 1959. ISBN 978-975-437-804-7
- Ruh Adam (Soul Man), İstanbul 1972. ISBN 978-975-437-802-3

=== Stories ===
- 'Dönüş' (The Return), In Atsız Mecmua, sayı.2 (1931), Orhun, Sayı.10 (1943)
- 'Şehidlerin Duası' (Prayer of Martyrs), In Atsız Mecmua, Sayı.3 (1931), Orhun, Sayı.12 (1943)
- 'Erkek, Kız' (Boy, Girl), In Atsız Mecmua, Sayı.4 (1931)
- 'İki Onbaşı, Galiçiya...1917...' (Two Corporals, Galicia...1917...), In Atsız Mecmua, Sayı.6 (1931), Çınaraltı, Sayı.67 (1942), Ötüken, Sayı.30 (1966)
- 'Her Çağın Masalı: Boz Doğan ve Sarı Yılan' (Tale of All Ages: Grey Hawk and Yellow Snake), In Ötüken, Sayı.28 (1966)

=== Poems ===
- 'Yolların Sonu' (End of Roads), İstanbul 1946. ISBN 978-975-437-806-1
