= Nejdet Sançar =

Turkish literature teacher (1910-1975)

- Born: Ahmet Necdet Sançar; May 1, 1910; Istanbul, Ottoman Empire (modern Turkey)
- Died: February 22, 1975 (aged 64); Istanbul, Turkey
- Education: Istanbul University
- Occupations: Teacher, Author, Politician
- Known for: Racism-Turanism trials
- Relatives: Nihal Atsız (older brother)

Ahmet Necdet Sançar (May 1, 1910 – February 22, 1975) was a Turkish literature teacher, who became one of the prominent personalities of the Pan-Turkist ideology. He was the younger brother of another notable Turkish nationalist, Nihal Atsız. Unlike his older brother, Sançar was a passionate Muslim and gave great importance to religion.

== Early life and education ==
He was born in Istanbul on May 1, 1910. His family was originally from Gümüşhane, and his father was a lieutenant commander in the Ottoman Navy. His siblings included Hüseyin Nihal Atsız, Fatma Nezihe and Necla. The reason why Sançar and his brother have different surnames is that when the surname law was enacted, Sançar was serving in the army to fulfill his military service. Since they could not communicate with each other, they took different surnames.

After graduating from Istanbul Boys' High School, he obtained a degree in Turcology from Istanbul University in 1936.

== Politics ==
The two brothers had strong similarities in many ways. They were both literature teachers and they were defending the same political ideology. Just like his brother, he was tried during the Türkçülük Davası (Racism-Turanism trials). The trial was a state reaction to the growing power of the nationalist front in the country because the nationalists were against the policies of the second president of Turkey, Ismet Pasha. In the end, Sançar wasn't found guilty and he was acquitted. He kept his extreme right-wing ideas until his death.

== Literature ==
Sançar's numerous articles were published in nationalist magazines. Also, he wrote five books which are Türklük Sevgisi (Love of the Turkic Identity), Irkımızın Kahramanları (Heroes of Our Race), Tarihte Türk-İtalyan Savaşları (Italo-Turkish Wars in History), Afşın'a Mektuplar (Letters to Afşın) and İsmet İnönü İle Hesaplaşma (Face to Face with İsmet İnönü).

== Death ==
Nejdet Sançar died on February 22, 1975, while he was working on an expanded version of his book Tarihte Türk-İtalyan Savaşları (Turkish-Italian Wars in History). Not even a year later, his brother died because of a heart attack. The deaths of the brothers caused a gap in the Pan-Turkist front.

== Trivia ==
- His only son, 15 years old Afşın, died in 1960. When Sançar heard the news, he had a serious stroke which he could only recover from partially.
- Sançar took an active role in associations like Türkiye Komünizmle Mücadele Derneği (Turkish Association of Fight with Communism) and Turkish Hearths (Turkish:Türk Ocakları).
- The surnames of Nihâl Atsız, Nejdet Sançar and their father are different because during the announcement of the Law on Family Names, they could not communicate because of Sançar's military service.
