= Turanism =

Pseudoscientific pan-nationalist movement

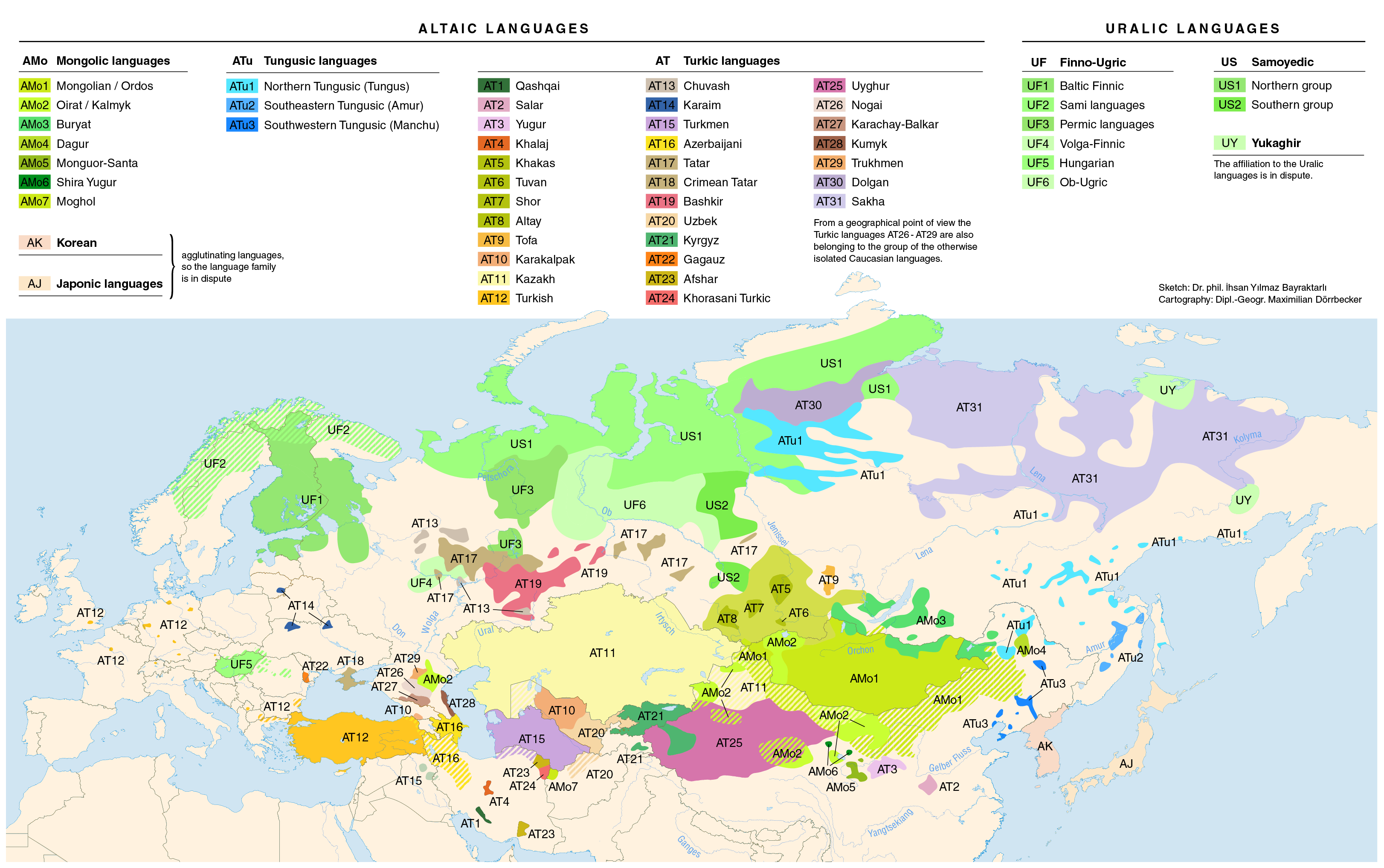
Map of Eurasia showing the "Altaic" and Uralic language-speaking regions, which are united under the "Turanian" theory.

Turanism, also known as Turanianism, pan-Turanism or pan-Turanianism, is a pan-nationalist political movement built around pseudoscientific claims of biological and linguistic connections between various ethnic groups of Eurasia. It revolves around the notion that Turkic, Mongolic, Tungusic, and Uralic peoples share close cultural, ethnic, and linguistic bonds due to Inner and Central Asian origins. Historically, one of its central components was the proposal of a Ural-Altaic language family, which has since been abandoned. Supporters of Turanism propose political unity among these groups, chiefly to oppose the cultural and political influences of the Indo-Europeans of Europe, West Asia, and South Asia, as well as the Sino-Tibetans of East Asia. The movement emerged in the 19th century to counter pan-nationalist ideologies such as pan-Germanism, and built upon the ideas of pan-Slavism (e.g. the idea of a "Turanian brotherhood and collaboration" was borrowed from the pan-Slavic concept of "Slavic brotherhood and collaboration").

== Origins and definitions ==
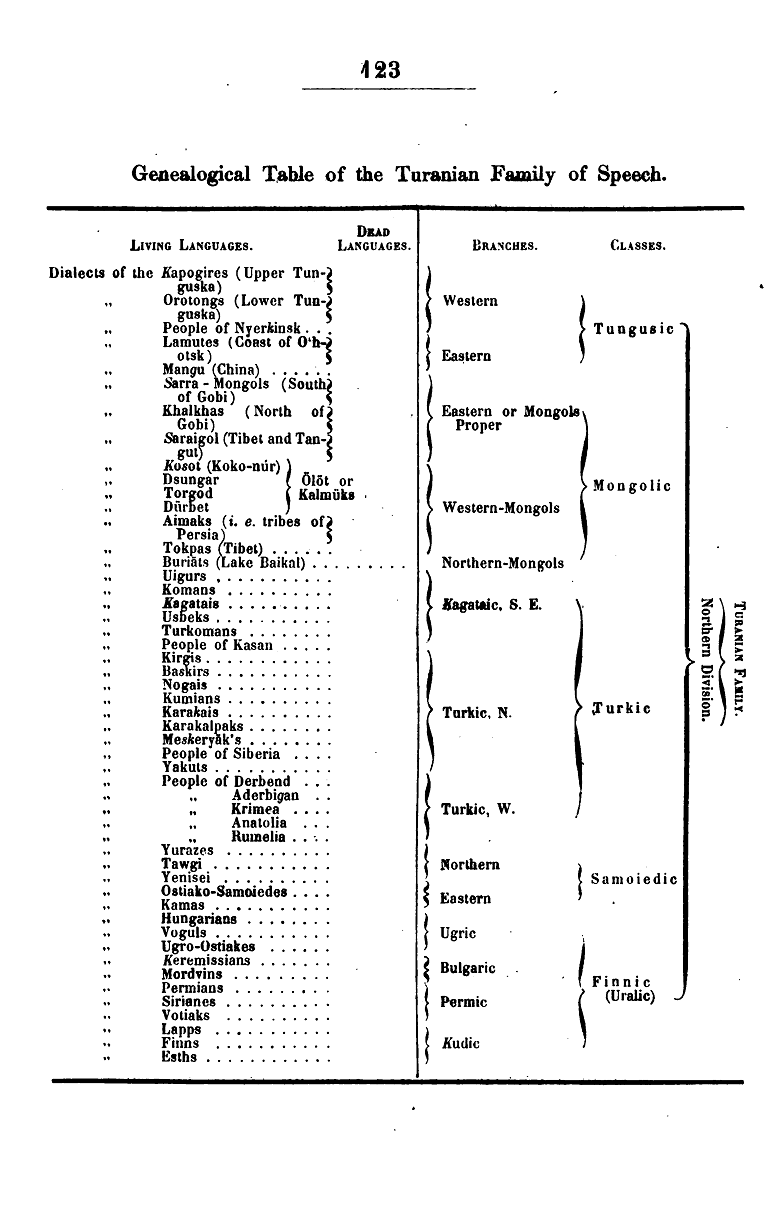
Max Müller's northern division of Turanian languages.

The concept of a Ural-Altaic ethnic and language family goes back to the linguistic theories of Gottfried Wilhelm Leibniz; in his opinion there was no better method for specifying the relationship and origin of the various peoples of the Earth, than the comparison of their languages. In his Brevis designatio meditationum de originibus gentium ductis potissimum ex indicio linguarum, written in 1710, he originates every human language from one common ancestor language. Over time, this ancestor language split into two families: the Japhetic and the Aramaic. The Japhetic family split even further, into Scythian and Celtic branches. The members of the Scythian family were: the Greek language, the family of Sarmato-Slavic languages (Russian, Polish, Czech, Dalmatian, Bulgar, Slovene, Avar), the family of Turkic languages (Turkish, Cuman, Kalmyk and Mongolian), the family of Finnic languages (Finnish, Saami, Hungarian, Estonian, Liv and Samoyed). Although his theory and grouping were far from perfect, it had a tremendous effect on the development of linguistic research, especially in German speaking countries.

The term "Turan" is of Iranian origin and is believed to have referred to a prehistorical human society in Central Asia. The term was widely used in scientific literature from the 18th century onwards to denote Central Asia. European scholars borrowed the term from the historical works of Abu al-Ghazi Bahadur; the annotated English translation of his Shajare-i Türk was published in 1729 and quickly became an oft-used source for European scholars.

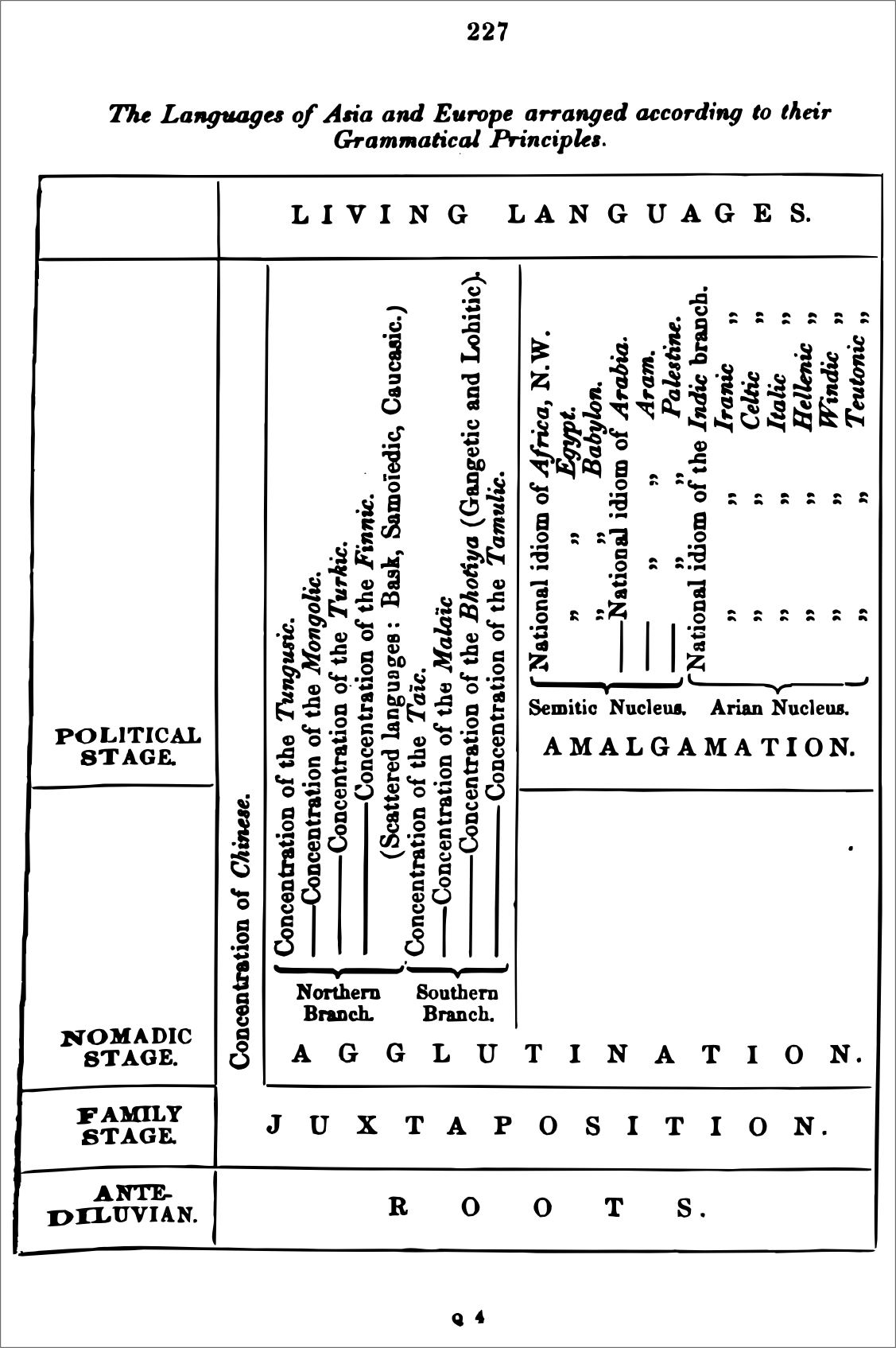
The languages of Asia and Europe arranged according to their grammatical principles in Max Müller's Letter to Chevalier Bunsen on the classification of the Turanian languages, published in 1854.

Friedrich Max Müller, the German Orientalist and philologist, published and proposed a new grouping of the non-Aryan and non-Semitic Asian languages in 1855. In his work The Languages of the Seat of War in the East, he called these languages "Turanian". Müller divided this group into two subgroups, the Southern Division and the Northern Division. In the long run, his evolutionist theory about languages' structural development, tying growing grammatical refinement to socio-economic development, and grouping languages into 'antediluvian', 'familial', 'nomadic', and 'political' developmental stages, proved unsound. Nonetheless, his terminology stuck, and the terms 'Turanian peoples' and 'Turanian languages' became parts of common parlance. Another proposed group, the Ural-Altaic languages, was later derived from Müller's Northern Division subgroup.

Like the term Aryan is used for Indo-European, Turanian is used chiefly as a linguistic term, synonymous with Ural-Altaic. However, the Ural-Altaic theory has been scientifically disproven. Concepts of areal linguistics and typology even if in a genetic sense of these terms might be considered as obsolete.

Turanism originated in the work of the Finnish nationalist and linguist Matthias Alexander Castrén, who championed the ideology. He concluded that the Finns originated in Central Asia (more specifically in the Altai Mountains) and far from being a small isolated people, they were part of a larger polity that included such peoples as the Magyars, Turks, and Mongols. It implies not only the unity of all Turkic peoples (as in pan-Turkism), but also the alliance of a wider Ural-Altaic family believed to include all speakers of the "Turanian languages".

Although Turanism is a political movement for the union of all Ural-Altaic peoples, there are different opinions about the movement's inclusivity. The early Turanist Ziya Gökalp opined that Turanism is for Turkic peoples only, as other Turanian peoples (Finns, Hungarians, Mongolians and so on) are too different culturally. In contrast, his contemporary Lothrop Stoddard gave the following description during World War I:

Right across northern Europe and Asia, from the Baltic to the Pacific and from the Mediterranean to the Arctic Ocean, there stretches a vast band of peoples to whom ethnologists have assigned the name of "Uralo-Altaic race", but who are more generally termed "Turanians". This group embraces the most widely scattered folk—the Ottoman Turks of Constantinople and Anatolia, the Turcomans of Central Asia and Persia, the Tatars of South Russia and Transcaucasia, the Magyars of Hungary, the Finns of Finland and the Baltic provinces, the aboriginal tribes of Siberia and even the distant Mongols and Manchus. Diverse though they are in culture, tradition, and even physical appearance, these peoples nevertheless possess certain well-marked traits in common. Their languages are all similar, and, what is of even more import, their physical and mental make-up displays undoubted affinities.

== By region ==
=== Europe ===
==== Finland ====
Turanism has its roots in the Finnish nationalist Fennophile and Fennoman movement, and in the works of Finnish nationalist and linguist Matthias Alexander Castrén. Castrén conducted more than seven years of fieldwork in western and southern Siberia between 1841 and 1849. His extensive field materials focus on Ob-Ugric, Samoyedic, Ketic, and Turkic languages. He collected valuable ethnographic information, especially on shamanism. Based on his research, he claimed that the Finnic, Ugric, Samoyed, Turkic, Mongolian and Tungusic languages were all of the same 'Altaic family'. He concluded that the Finns originated in Central Asia (in the Altai Mountains), and far from being a small, isolated people, they were part of a larger polity that included such peoples as the Magyars, Turks, Mongols, and so on. Based on his research, he championed the ideology of Turanism, the belief in the ethnic unity and the future greatness of the Ural-Altaic peoples. As Castrén put it:

I am determined to show the Finnish nation that we are not a solitary people from the bog, living in isolation from the world and from universal history, but are in fact related to at least one-sixth of mankind. Writing grammars is not my main goal, but without the grammars that goal cannot be attained.

Castrén was of the opinion that Russia was seeking systematically to prevent all development towards freer conditions in Finland, and concluded from this that the Finns must begin to prepare a revolt against Russia. According to him, it was to be linked with a favourable international crisis and would be realised as a general revolt against Russian rule, in which the non-Russian peoples from the Turks and Tatars to the Finns would take part. This political vision of his was shared by some other intellectuals. Fennomans like Elias Lönnrot and Zachris Topelius shared this or an even bolder vision of coming greatness. As Topelius put it:

Two hundred years ago few would have believed that the Slavic tribe would attain the prominent (and constantly growing) position it enjoys nowadays in the history of culture. What if one day the Finnish tribe, which occupies a territory almost as vast, were to play a greater role on the world scene than one could expect nowadays? [...] Today people speak of Pan-Slavism; one day they may talk of Pan-Fennicism, or Pan-Suomism. Within such a Pan-Finnic community, the Finnish nation should hold the leading position because of its cultural seniority [...].

==== Hungary ====
Hungarian Turanism (Hungarian: Turanizmus) was a Romantic nationalist cultural and political movement which was most active from the second half of the 19th century through the first half of the 20th century. It was based on the age old and still living national tradition about the Asian origins of the Magyars. This tradition was preserved in medieval chronicles (such as Gesta Hungarorum and Gesta Hunnorum et Hungarorum, and the Chronicon Pictum) as early as the 13th century. This tradition served as the starting point for the scientific research about the ethnogenesis of the Hungarian people, which began in the 18th century, both in Hungary and abroad. Sándor Kőrösi Csoma (the writer of the first Tibetan-English dictionary) traveled to Asia in the strong belief that he could find the kindred of the Magyars in Turkestan, amongst the Uyghurs. As a scientific movement, Turanism was concerned with the research about Asia and its culture in the context of Hungarian history and culture. Political Turanism was born in the 19th century, in response to the growing influence of Pan-Germanism and Pan-Slavism, which were seen by Hungarians as very dangerous to the state and nation of Hungary because the country had large ethnic German and Slavic populations. Political Turanism was a romantic nationalist movement, which accentuated the importance of the common ancestry and the cultural affinity of the Hungarians with the peoples of the Caucasus, Inner and Central Asia, like the Turks, Mongols, Parsi and the like, and called for closer collaboration and political alliance with them, as a means to secure and further shared interests, and counter the imminent threats posed by the policies of Western powers like Germany, the British Empire, France and Russia.

The idea of a Hungarian Oriental Institute originated with Jenő Zichy. This idea did not come true. Instead, a kind of lyceum was formed in 1910, called Turáni Társaság (Hungarian Turan Society, also called Hungarian Asiatic Society). The Turan society concentrated on Turan as geographic location where the ancestors of Hungarians might have lived.

The movement received impetus after Hungary's defeat in World War I. Under the terms of the Treaty of Trianon (1920), the new Hungarian state constituted only 32.7% of the territory of historic, pre-treaty Hungary, and it lost 58.4% of its total population. More than 3.2 million ethnic Hungarians (one-third of all Hungarians) resided outside the new boundaries of Hungary in the successor states under oppressive conditions. Old Hungarian cities of great cultural importance like Pozsony (a former capital of the country), Kassa, and Kolozsvár (present-day Bratislava, Košice, and Cluj-Napoca respectively) were lost. Under these circumstances, no Hungarian government could survive without seeking justice for both the Magyars and Hungary. Reuniting the Magyars became a crucial point in public life and on the political agenda. Outrage led many to reject Europe and turn towards the East in search of new friends and allies in a bid to revise the unjust terms of the treaty and restore the integrity of Hungary.

Disappointment towards Europe caused by 'the betrayal of the West in Trianon', and the pessimistic feeling of loneliness, led different strata in society towards Turanism. They tried to look for friends, kindred peoples and allies in the East so that Hungary could break out of its isolation and regain its well deserved position among the nations. A more radical group of conservative, rightist people, sometimes even with an anti-Semitic hint propagated sharply anti-Western views and the superiority of Eastern culture, the necessity of a pro-Eastern policy, and development of the awareness of Turanic racialism among Hungarian people.

On 1 June 1924, the Magyar-Nippon Társaság (Hungarian-Japanese Society) was founded by private persons in order to strengthen Hungarian-Japanese cultural relations and exchanges.

Turanism was never embraced officially because it was not in accord with the Christian conservative ideological background of the regime, but it was used by the government as an informal tool to break the country's international isolation, and build alliances. Hungary signed treaties of friendship and collaboration with the Republic of Turkey in 1923, with the Republic of Estonia in 1937, with the Republic of Finland in 1937, with Japan in 1938, and with Bulgaria in 1941.

After World War II, the Soviet Red Army occupied Hungary. The Hungarian government was placed under the direct control of the administration of the occupying forces. All Turanist organisations were disbanded by the government, and the majority of Turanist publications was banned and confiscated. In 1948, Hungary was converted into a communist one-party state. Turanism was portrayed and vilified as an exclusively fascist ideology although Turanism's role in the interwar development of far-right ideologies was negligible.

==== Turkey ====
Traditional history cites its early origins amongst Ottoman officers and intelligentsia studying and residing in 1870s Imperial Germany. The fact that many Ottoman Turkish officials were becoming aware of their sense of "Turkishness" is beyond doubt of course, and the role of subsequent nationalists, such as Ziya Gökalp is fully established historically. As the Turkish historian Hasan Bülent Paksoy put it, an aspiration emerged that the Turkic peoples might "form a political entity stretching from the Altai Mountains in Eastern Asia to the Bosphorus". During the late 19th century, the works of renowned Hungarian Orientalist and linguist Ármin Vámbéry contributed to the spreading of Turkish nationalism and Turanism. Vámbéry was employed by the British Foreign office as an advisor and agent. He was paid well for his accounts about his meetings with members of the Ottoman elite and Sultan Abdul Hamid II, and for his essays concerning Ottoman politics. The Ottoman Empire fell into ever deepening decline during the 19th century. There were reform and modernization attempts as early as the 1830s (Tanzimat), but the country was lowered to an almost semi-colonial state at the turn of the century (the state accumulated an enormous amount of debt and state finances were placed under direct foreign control), and the great powers freely preyed on her, occupying or annexing parts of her territory at will (e.g. Cyprus). At the time, the Russian and British empires were antagonists in the so-called "Great Game" to cultivate influence in Persia and Central Asia (Turkestan). Russia and Britain systematically fanned the rivalling nationalisms of the multi-ethnic empire for their own ends, and this led to the strengthening of Turkish nationalism as a result. The nationalist movement of the Young Turks aimed for a secularized nation-state, and constitutional government in a parliamentary democracy.

The political party of the Young Turks, the Committee of Union and Progress, embraced Turanism, and a glorification of Turkish ethnic identity, and was devoted to protecting the Turkic peoples living under foreign rule (most of them under Russian rule as a result of Russia's enormous territorial expansion during the 16th and 19th centuries), and to restoring the Ottoman Empire's shattered national pride.

The Turkish version of Turanism was summed up by American politicians at the time of First World War as follows: "It has been shown above that the Turkish version of Turanism contains two general ideas: (a) To purify and strengthen the Turkish nationality within the Ottoman Empire, and (b) to link up the Ottoman Turks with the other Turks in the world. These objects were first pursued in the cultural sphere by a private group of 'Intellectuals', and promoted by peaceful propaganda. After 1913, they took on a political form and were incorporated in the programme of the C.U.P.", but Ottoman defeat in World War I briefly undermined the notion of Turanism.

After World War I, Turkish nationalists and Turanists joined the Basmachi movement in Central Asia, to help their struggle against the Soviets. The most prominent amongst them was Enver Pasha, the former Ottoman war minister.

Turanism forms an important aspect of the ideology of the modern Turkish Nationalist Movement Party (MHP), whose youth movement is informally known as the Grey Wolves. Grey Wolf (the mother wolf Asena) was the main symbol of the ancient Turkic peoples.

=== Americas ===
Some Pan-Turanists proposed that Native Americans may have possible genetic and linguistic connection with the Turkic and other nomadic tribes in Asia. They have pointed to Native American culture, dance, and customs as being similar to those found in Siberia and Northeast Asia, although since changed after the migration of the Native Americans from Siberia to the Americas; examples of Native American peoples whose customs are cited include Melungeon people, as well as the Inuit and Quechua.

== Pseudoscientific theories ==
Turanism has been characterized by pseudoscientific theories. According to other opinions the scientific work of the scholar members (like Jenő Cholnoky, Lajos Ligeti, Zoltán Felvinczi Takács and others) of the Hungarian Turanian Society belonged to the frontline of the scientific life of the era. According to the Turanian or Ural-Altaic kinship theories, "Turanians" include Bulgarians, Estonians, Mongols, Finns, and Turks. Though the underlying scientific theories are widely questioned or rejected in contemporary scholarship, Turanism still has extensive support in certain Turkic-speaking countries. Referred to as Pseudo-Turkologists, these scholars stamp all Eurasian nomads and major civilizations in history as being of Turkic or Turanian origin. In such countries, Turanism has served as a form of national therapy, helping its proponents cope with the failures of the past.

== See also ==
- Altaic languages
- Division of the Mongol Empire
- Eurasianism
- Gog and Magog
- Greater Finland
- Great Kurultáj
- Heimosodat
- Pan-Asianism
- Racism-Turanism trials
- Sun Language Theory
- Tartary
- Turan Group
- Turco-Mongols
- Turkic migration
- Uralic neopaganism
