= Pan-Turkism =

Political movement advocating the unity of Turkic peoples

Flag of the Organization of Turkic States

Flag misattributed to the Turkic Khaganate (Note: According to the Book of Zhou and the Book of Sui (later repeated by History of the Northern Dynasties), Göktürks erected a tuğ banner decorated with a wolf's head made of gold to show that they had not forgotten their origin from a she-wolf ancestress. A tuğ is a banner made of horse-hairs and based on Chinese banners made of yak-hairs (纛 standard Chinese dú < Middle Chinese *dok))

Pan-Turkism (Turkish: Pan-Türkizm) or Turkism (Turkish: Türkçülük or Türkizm) is a political movement that emerged during the 1880s among Turkic intellectuals who lived in the Russian region of Kazan (Tatarstan), South Caucasus (modern-day Azerbaijan) and the Ottoman Empire (modern-day Turkey), with its aim being the cultural and political unification of all Turkic peoples. Turanism is a closely related movement but it is a more general term, because Turkism only applies to Turkic peoples. However, researchers and politicians who are steeped in the pan-Turkic ideology have used these terms interchangeably in many sources and works of literature.

Although many of the Turkic peoples share historical, cultural and linguistic roots, the rise of a pan-Turkic political movement is a phenomenon of the 19th and 20th centuries. Ottoman poet Ziya Gökalp defined pan-Turkism as a cultural, academic, and philosophical and political concept advocating the unity of Turkic peoples. Ideologically, it was premised on social Darwinism. Pan-Turkism has been characterized by pseudoscientific theories known as Pseudo-Turkology.

== Name ==
In research literature, "pan-Turkism" is used to describe the political, cultural and ethnic unity of all Turkic people. "Turkism" began to be used with the prefix "pan-" (from the Greek πᾶν, pan = all).

Proponents use the latter as a point of comparison, since "Turkic" is a linguistic, ethnic and cultural distinction rather than a citizenship description. This differentiates it from "Turkish", which is the term which is officially used in reference to citizens of Turkey. Pan-Turkic ideas and reunification movements have become popular since the collapse of the Soviet Union in Central Asian and other Turkic countries.

== History ==
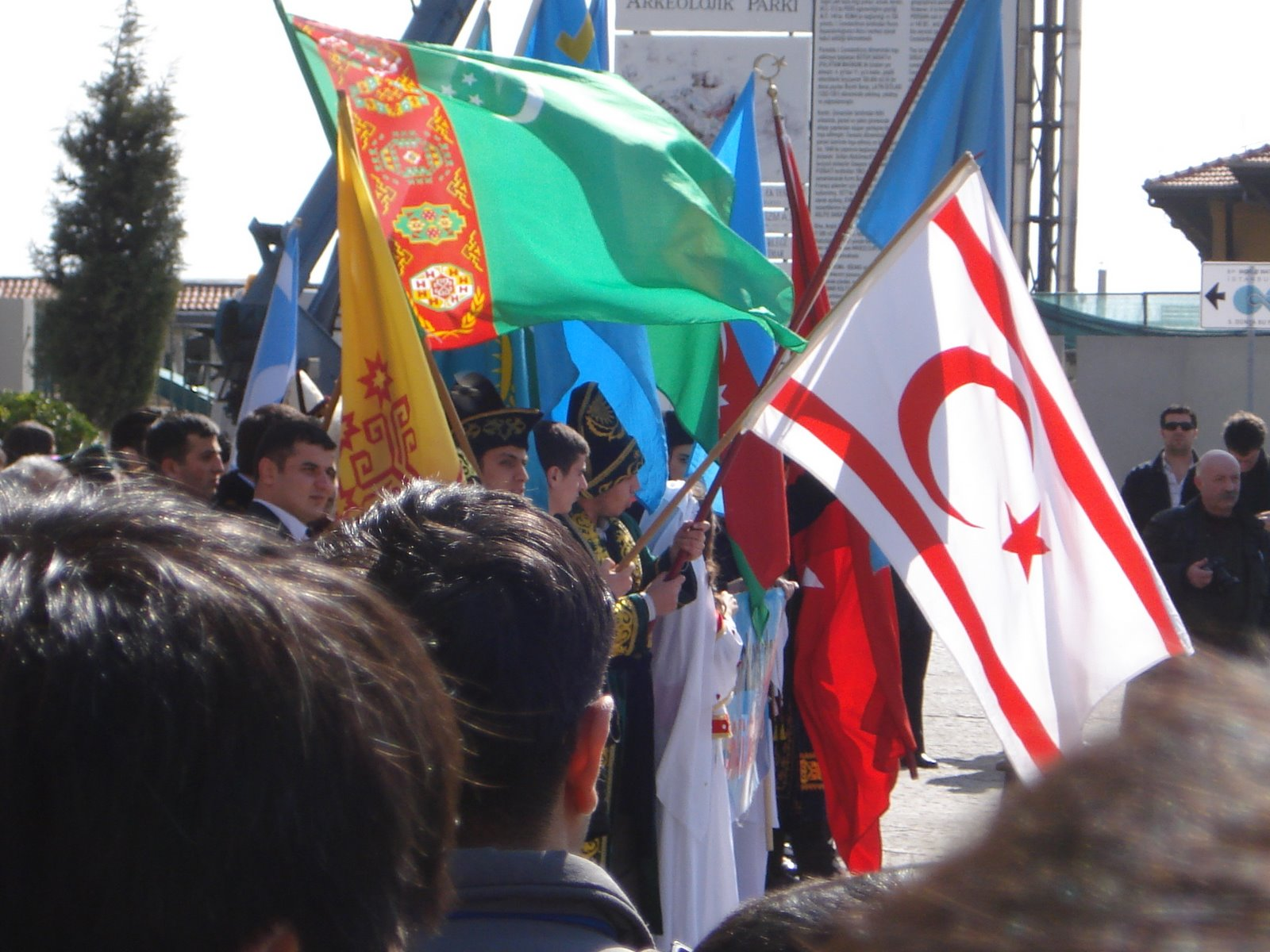
Pan-Turkic rally in Istanbul, March 2009

=== Development and spread ===
In 1804, the Tatar theologian Ghabdennasir Qursawi wrote a treatise calling for the modernization of Islam. Qursawi was a Jadid (from the Arabic word jadid, "new"). The Jadids encouraged critical thinking, supported education and advocated the equality of the sexes, advocated tolerance of other faiths, advocated Turkic cultural unity, and advocated openness to Europe’s cultural legacy. The Jadid movement was founded in 1843 in Kazan. Its aim was the implementation of a semi-secular modernization program and the implementation of an educational reform program, both programs would emphasize the national (rather than the religious) identity of the Turks. Before they founded their movement in 1843, the Jadids considered themselves Muslim subjects of the Russian Empire, a belief which they held until the Jadid movement disbanded.

After they joined the Wäisi movement, the Jadids advocated national liberation. After 1907, many supporters of Turkic unity immigrated to the Ottoman Empire.

The newspaper Türk in Cairo was published by exiles from the Ottoman Empire after the suspension of the Ottoman constitution of 1876 and the persecution of liberal intellectuals. It was the first publication to use the ethnic designation as its title. Yusuf Akçura published "Three Types of Policy" (Üç tarz-ı siyaset) anonymously in 1904, the earliest manifesto of a pan-Turkic nationalism. Akçura argued that the supra-ethnic union espoused by the Ottomans was unrealistic. The Pan-Islamic model had advantages, but Muslim populations were under colonial rule which would oppose unification. He concluded that an ethnic Turkish nation would require the cultivation of a national identity; a pan-Turkish empire would abandon the Balkans and Eastern Europe in favor of Central Asia. The first publication of "Three Types of Policy" had a negative reaction, but it became more influential by its third publication in 1911 in Istanbul. The Ottoman Empire had lost its African territory to the Kingdom of Italy and it would soon lose the Balkans. Pan-Turkish nationalism consequently became a more feasible (and popular) political strategy.

In 1908, the Committee of Union and Progress came to power in Ottoman Turkey, and the empire adopted a nationalistic ideology. This contrasted with its largely Muslim ideology which dated back to the 16th century, when the sultan was the caliph of his Muslim lands. Leaders who espoused Pan-Turkism fled from Russia and moved to Istanbul, where a strong pan-Turkic movement arose; the Turkish pan-Turkic movement grew and transformed itself into a nationalistic, ethnically oriented movement which sought to replace the caliphate with a state. After the fall of the Ottoman Empire, some of them tried to replace the multi-cultural and multi-ethnic empire with a Turkish commonwealth, the advocates of this idea were influenced by the nationalism of the Young Turks. Leaders like Mustafa Kemal Atatürk acknowledged that such a goal was impossible, replacing pan-Turkic idealism with a form of nationalism which aimed to preserve the existence of an Anatolian nucleus.

The Türk Yurdu Dergisi (Journal of the Turkish Homeland) was founded in 1911 by Akçura. This was the most important Turkist publication of the time, "in which, along with other Turkic exiles from Russia, [Akçura] attempted to instill a consciousness about the cultural unity of all Turkic peoples of the world."

In 1923, Ziya Gökalp, famous poet and theorician of Turkism ideology, wrote his book The Principles of Turkism and idealized the unity of Turkic peoples by calling Turan as a goal of Turkism.

A significant early exponent of pan-Turkism was Enver Pasha (1881–1922), the Ottoman Minister of War and acting commander-in-chief during World War I. He later became a leader of the Basmachi movement (1916–1934) against Russian and Soviet rule in Central Asia. During World War II, the Nazis founded a Turkestan Legion which was primarily composed of soldiers who hoped to establish an independent Central Asian state after the war. The German intrigue bore no fruit.

When the Turkish Republic was established under the leadership of Mustafa Kemal Atatürk in 1923, interest in Pan-Turkism declined, because Atatürk promoted Turkish nationalism within Turkey. The Pan-Turkist movements gained some momentum in the 1940s, due to the support which it received from Nazi Germany, which sought to use Pan-Turkism as leverage in order to undermine Russian influence in an effort to acquire the resources of Central Asia during the course of World War II. The development of pan-Turkist and anti-Soviet ideology, in some circles, was influenced by Nazi propaganda during this period. Some sources claim that Nihal Atsız advocated Nazi doctrines and adopted a Hitler-style haircut. Alparslan Türkeş, a leading pan-Turkist, took a pro-Hitler position during the war and developed close connections with Nazi leaders in Germany. Several pan-Turkic groups in Europe apparently had ties to Nazi Germany (or its supporters) at the start of the war, if not earlier. The Turco-Tatars in Romania cooperated with the Iron Guard, a Romanian fascist organisation. Although the Turkish government's archives which date back to the World War II years have not been declassified, the level of contact can be ascertained from German archives. A ten-year Turco-German treaty of friendship was signed in Ankara on 18 January 1941. Official and semi-official meetings between German ambassador Franz von Papen and other German officials and Turkish officials, including General H. E. Erkilet (of Tatar origin and a frequent contributor to pan-Turkic journals) took place in the second half of 1941 and the early months of 1942. The Turkish officials included General Ali Fuad Erdem and Nuri Pasha (Killigil), brother of Enver Pasha.

Pan-Turkists were not supported by the Turkish government during this time and on 19 May 1944, İsmet İnönü made a speech in which he condemned Pan-Turkism as "a dangerous and sick demonstration of the latest times" going on to say that the Turkish Republic was "facing efforts hostile to the existence of the Republic" and those who advocate these ideas "will only bring trouble and disaster". Nihal Atsız and other prominent pan-Turkist leaders were tried and sentenced to imprisonment for conspiring against the government. Zeki Velidi Togan was sentenced to ten years imprisonment and four years in internal exile, Reha Oğuz Türkkan was sentenced to five years and ten months in prison and two years in exile, Nihal Atsız was sentenced to six years, six months and 15 days in prison and 3 years in exile. Others were sentenced to prison terms which only ranged from a few months to four years in length. But the defendants appealed the convictions and in October 1945, the sentences of all the convicted were abolished by the Military Court of Cassation.

While Erkilet discussed military contingencies, Nuri Pasha told the Germans about his plan to establish independent states which would be allies (not satellites) of Turkey. These states would be formed by the Turkic-speaking populations which lived in Crimea, Azerbaijan, Central Asia, northwestern Iran, and northern Iraq. Nuri Pasha offered to assist Nazi Germany's propaganda efforts on behalf of this cause. However, Turkey's government also feared for the survival of the Turkic minorities in the USSR and it told von Papen that it could not join Germany until the USSR was crushed. The Turkish government may have been apprehensive about Soviet might, which kept the country out of the war. On a less-official level, Turkic emigrants from the Soviet Union played a crucial role in negotiations and contacts between Turkey and Germany; among them were prominent pan-Turkic activists like Zeki Velidi Togan, Mammed Amin Rasulzade, Mirza Bala, Ahmet Caferoĝlu, Sayid Shamil and Ayaz İshaki. Several Tatar military units which consisted of Turkic speakers from the Turco-Tatar and Caucasian regions of the USSR who had previously been prisoners of war of the Germans joined them and fought against the Soviets, the members of these Tatar military units generally fought as guerrillas in the hope that they would be able to secure the independence of their homelands and establish a pan-Turkic union. The units, which were reinforced, numbered several hundred thousand. Turkey took a cautious approach at the government level, but pan-Turkists were angered by the Turkish government's inaction because they believed that it was wasting a golden opportunity to achieve the goals of pan-Turkism.

== Pseudoscientific theories ==
There is no such thing as the Kurdish people or nation. They are merely carriers of Turkish culture and habits. The imagined region proposed as the new Kurdistan is the region that was settled by the proto-Turks. The Sumerians and Scythians come immediately to mind.

— Orhan Türkdoğan – Professor of Sociology at Gebze Technical University

Pan-Turkism has been characterized by pseudoscientific theories known as Pseudo-Turkology. Though dismissed in serious scholarship, scholars promoting such theories, often known as Pseudo-Turkologists, have in recent times emerged among every Turkic nationality.

A leading light among them is Murad Adzhi, who insists that two hundred thousand years ago, "an advanced people of Turkic blood" were living in the Altai Mountains. These tall and blond Turks are supposed to have founded the world's first state, Idel-Ural, 35,000 years ago, and to have migrated as far as the Americas and became the ancestors of the peoples that later created the Aztec Empire, Inca Empire and Maya civilization.

According to theories like the Turkish History Thesis, promoted by pseudo-scholars, the Turkic peoples are supposed to have migrated from Central Asia to the Middle East in the Neolithic. The Hittites, Sumerians, Babylonians, ancient Egyptians, alongside Aztecs, Mayans and Quechua peoples are here classified as being of Turkic origin. The Kurgan cultures of the early Bronze Age up to more recent times are also typically ascribed to Turkic peoples by pan-Turkic pseudoscholars, such as Ismail Miziev. Non-Turkic peoples typically classified as Turkic, Turkish, Proto-Turkish or Turanian include Scythians, Sakas, Cimmerians, Medes, Parthians, Caucasian Albanians, and various ethnic minorities in Turkic countries, such as Kurds.

Adzhi also considers Alans, Goths, Burgundians, Saxons, Alemanni, Angles, Lombards, and many Russians as Turks. Only a few prominent peoples in history, such as Jews, Chinese people, Armenians, Greeks, Persians, and Scandinavians are considered non-Turkic by Adzhi. Philologist Mirfatyh Zakiev, former chairman of the Supreme Soviet of the Tatar ASSR, has published hundreds of "scientific" works on the subject, suggesting Turkic origins of the Sumerian, Greek, Icelandic, Etruscan and Minoan languages. Zakiev contends that "proto-Turkish is the starting point of the Indo-European languages". Not only peoples and cultures, but also prominent individuals, such as Saint George, Peter the Great, Mikhail Kutuzov and Fyodor Dostoevsky, are proclaimed to have been "of Turkic origin".

As such the Turkic peoples are supposed to have once been the "benevolent conquerors" of the peoples of most of Eurasia, who thus owe them "a huge cultural debt". The pseudoscientific Sun Language Theory states that all human languages are descendants of a proto-Turkic language and was developed by the Turkish president Mustafa Kemal Atatürk during the 1930s. Kairat Zakiryanov considers the Japanese and Kazakh gene pools to be identical. Several Turkish academics (Şevket Koçsoy, Özkan İzgi, Emel Esin) claim that Zhou dynasty were of Turkic origins.

== Criticism of pan-Turkism ==
Pan-Turkism is often perceived as being a new form of Turkish, and in a lesser extent, Azerbaijani imperial ambition, and has been recently accused of Oghuzification of history. Some view the Turkish and Azerbaijani leaders who believed that they could reclaim the prestige of the Ottoman Empire by espousing the pan-Turkist ideology as racist and chauvinistic.

=== Pan-Turkist views on Armenian history ===
Clive Foss, professor of ancient history at the University of Massachusetts Boston, critically notes that in 1982: The Armenian File in the Light of History, Cemal Anadol writes that the Iranian Scythians and Parthians are Turks. According to Anadol, the Armenians welcomed the Turks into the region; their language is a mixture with no roots and their alphabet is mixed, with 11 characters which were borrowed from the ancient Turkic alphabet. Foss calls this view historical revisionism: "Turkish writings have been tendentious: history has been viewed as performing a useful service, proving or supporting a point of view, and so it is treated as something flexible which can be manipulated at will". He concludes, "The notion, which seems well established in Turkey, that the Armenians were a wandering tribe without a home, who never had a state of their own, is of course entirely without any foundation in fact. The logical consequence of the commonly expressed view of the Armenians is that they have no place in Turkey, and they never did. The result would be the same if the viewpoint were expressed first, and the history were written to order. In a sense, something like this seems to have happened, for most Turks who grew up under the Republic were educated to believe in the ultimate priority of Turks in all parts of history, and ignore the Armenians all together; they had been clearly consigned to oblivion."

=== Zangezur corridor ===
Azerbaijan and Turkey promote their vision of a land corridor through Armenian territory as a means of "uniting the Turkic world"

The Zangezur corridor (Note: Zangezur refers to the historical and geographical region in the Caucasus. In Azerbaijan, the variation "Zangazur corridor" is used as well. The concept has also been referred to by press and media as the "Nakhchivan corridor" (Armenian: Նախիջևանի միջանցք; Azerbaijani: Naxçıvan dəhlizi), the "Meghri corridor", (Armenian: Մեղրիի միջանցք; Azerbaijani: Meğri dəhlizi) and the "Syunik corridor" (Armenian: Սյունիքի միջանցք; Azerbaijani: Sünik dəhlizi).) is a concept for a transport corridor that emerged after the 2020 Nagorno-Karabakh War, promoted primarily by Azerbaijan and Turkey as a direct land link between mainland Azerbaijan and its Nakhchivan exclave through Armenia’s southern Syunik Province. This proposed route, is envisioned without Armenian checkpoints and is framed by its supporters as a way to connect the broader Turkic world. (Note: Zangezur refers to the historical and geographical region in the Caucasus. In Azerbaijan, the variation "Zangazur corridor" is used as well. The concept has also been referred to by press and media as the "Nakhchivan corridor" (Armenian: Նախիջևանի միջանցք; Azerbaijani: Naxçıvan dəhlizi), the "Meghri corridor", (Armenian: Մեղրիի միջանցք; Azerbaijani: Meğri dəhlizi) and the "Syunik corridor" (Armenian: Սյունիքի միջանցք; Azerbaijani: Sünik dəhlizi).) Armenia has steadily objected to it, asserting that "corridor logic" deviates from the ceasefire terms, and that it is a form of propaganda that threatens Armenian sovereignty.

Certain critics regard the concept as a pan-Turkic expansionist project. Azerbaijan has threatened to force the corridor’s creation using if Armenia does not agree. Turkey has long sought to establish a direct land corridor to mainland Azerbaijan. Multiple sources state that this ambition was a driving factor behind the Armenian genocide, as the Armenian population represented a geographical obstacle between Turkic entities. Genocide Watch characterizes the corridor as a pan-Turkic project which "will cost thousands of Armenian lives." The Lemkin Institute for Genocide Prevention has stated that the seizure of Armenia's Syunik region would "realize the pan-Turkic dream that fueled the Armenian Genocide of 1915-1923," adding that Azerbaijan's "actions extend far beyond mere territorial disputes, touching upon the very existence of Armenia and Armenians in what is left of their ancestral homeland."

Ahmad Kazemi, academic and researcher on Eurasian issues, wrote that "Azerbaijan is seeking to establish the so-called pan-Turkic illusionary Zangezur corridor in south of Armenia under the pretext of creating connectivity in the region," arguing that "this corridor is not compatible with any of the present geopolitical and historical realities of the region."

Since the end of the Second Nagorno-Karabakh War, Azerbaijan has increasingly promoted expansionist claims to Armenian territory which it describes as "Western Azerbaijan." In September 2022, pro-government media and certain Azerbaijani officials briefly promoted the irredentist concept of the "Goycha-Zangazur Republic" which claims all of southern Armenia. Azerbaijani parliamentarian Hikmat Babaoghlu criticized the idea, stating that it weakens Azerbaijan's public case to create the Zangezur corridor.

=== Pan-Turkist views in Azerbaijan ===
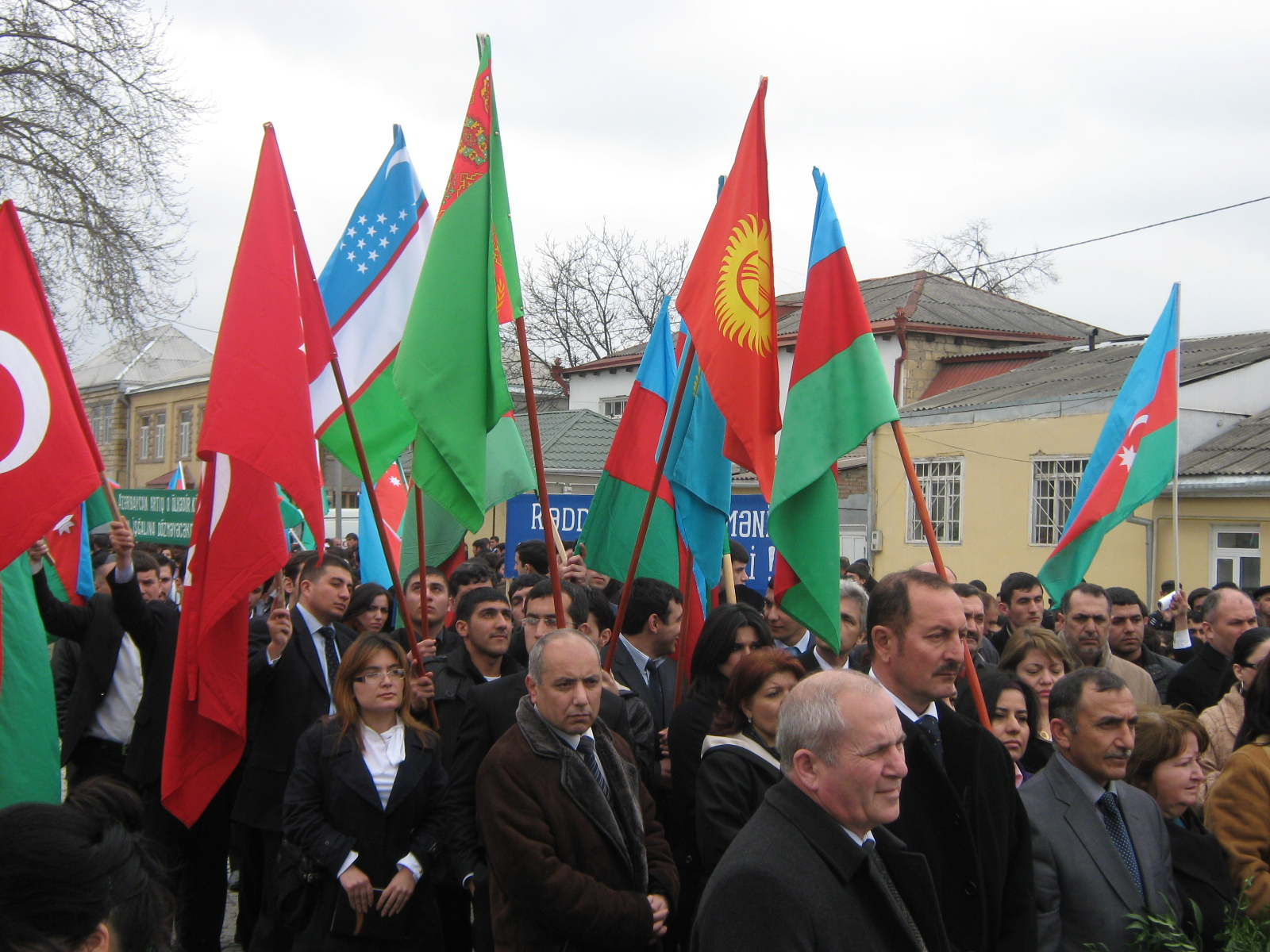
Pan-Turkic rally in Quba, 2011

Kâzım Karabekir said

The aim of all Turks is to unite with the Turkic borders. History is affording us today the last opportunity. In order for the Islamic world not to be forever fragmented it is necessary that the campaign against Karabagh be not allowed to abate. As a matter of fact drive the point home in Azeri circles that the campaign should be pursued with greater determination and severity.

Western Azerbaijan is a nickname used in the Republic of Azerbaijan to refer to Armenia. Its claims are based on the belief that current Armenia was ruled by Turkic tribes and states from the Late Middle Ages to the Treaty of Turkmenchay which was signed after the 1826–1828 Russo-Persian War. The concept has been sanctioned by the government of Azerbaijan and its current president, Ilham Aliyev, who has said that Armenia is part of ancient Turkic, Azerbaijani land. Turkish and Azerbaijani historians have said that Armenians are alien, not indigenous, in the Caucasus and Anatolia.

During the existence of the Azerbaijan SSR of the Soviet Union, pan-Turkist political elites of Baku who were loyal to the Communist cause, in tandem with Soviet-era historical revisionism and myth-building, invented a national history based on the existence of an Azerbaijani nation-state that dominated the areas to the north and south of the Aras river, which was supposedly torn apart by an Iranian-Russian conspiracy in the Treaty of Turkmenchay of 1828. This "imagined community" was cherished, promoted and institutionalized in formal history books of the educational system of the Azerbaijan SSR and the post-Soviet Azerbaijan Republic. As the Soviet Union was a closed society, and its people were unaware of the actual realities regarding Iran and its citizens of Azerbaijani descent, the elites in Soviet Azerbaijan kept cherishing and promoting the idea of a "united Azerbaijan" in their activities. This romantic thought led to the founding of nostalgic literary works, known as the "literature of longing"; examples amongst this genre are, for instance, Foggy Tabriz by Mammed Said Ordubadi, and The Coming Day by Mirza Ibrahimov. As a rule, works belonging to the "literature of longing" genre were characterized by depicting the life of Iranian Azerbaijanis as a misery due to suppression by the "Fars" (Persians), and by narrating stories about Iranian Azerbaijanis waiting for the day when their "brothers" from the "north" would come and liberate them. Works that belonged to this genre, as the historian and political scientist Zaur Gasimov explains, "were examples of blatant Azerbaijani nationalism stigmatizing the “division” of the nation along the river Araxes, as well as denunciations of economic and cultural exploitation of Iranian Azerbaijanis, etc." Gasimov adds: "an important by-product of this literary genre was strongly articulated anti-Iranian rhetoric. Tolerance and even support of this anti-Iranian rhetoric by the communist authorities were obvious."

Nationalist political elites in post-Soviet Azerbaijan, being the inheritors of this mentality created during the Soviet rule, forwarded this "mission" for achieving a "united Azerbaijan" as a political goal of utmost importance. Azerbaijani president Abulfaz Elchibey (1992–93) devoted his life to carrying out this mission, and he, in tandem with other pan-Turkist elites, went on a campaign for the ethnic awakening of Iranian Azerbaijanis. It may be due to these ideas that Elchibey was elected president in the new country's first presidential election in 1992. He and his government has been widely described as pursuing Pan-Turkic and anti-Iranian policies. Other than the pan-Turkist leadership, nationalist intellectuals and Azerbaijani media also stipulated the question of "Southern Azerbaijan" in their main political agenda's. In 1995-1996, according to one survey of the Azerbaijani press, the question of Iranian Azerbaijanis was covered more than any other topic by state-controlled and independent outlets in the young republic of Azerbaijan. Since 1918, political elites with Pan-Turkist-oriented sentiments in the area that comprises the present-day Azerbaijan Republic have depended on the concept of ethnic nationalism in order to create an anti-Iranian sense of ethnicity amongst Iranian Azerbaijanis. Iranian Azerbaijani intellectuals who have promoted Iranian cultural and national identity and put forth a reaction to early pan-Turkist claims over Iran's Azerbaijan region have been dubbed traitors to the "Azerbaijani nation" within the pan-Turkist media of the Republic of Azerbaijan.

Ahmad Kazemi, the author of the book Security in South Caucasus, told Iran's Strategic Council on Foreign Relations in a 2021 interview that "Azerbaijan is seeking to establish the so-called pan-Turkish illusionary Zangezur corridor in south of Armenia under the pretext of creating connectivity in the region", arguing that "this corridor is not compatible with any of the present geopolitical and historical realities of the region".

=== Turkification of Genghis Khan ===
Genghis Khan, founder of the Mongol Empire, was and is largely recognised as Mongol ruler. However, due to the fluidity of his Mongol force and the incorporation of many Turkic tribes into his imperial realm at the time, this has led to an attempt to claim the history of the Mongol conqueror as a Turk, especially within the Turkish and Azerbaijani sphere, which has also led to genocidal and denial ideas to emerge as they seek to make Genghis Khan their national icon. The result is an extensive Turkification, especially within the Oghuz sphere, about Genghis Khan's history to grant him the position in Turkic history.

=== Indian civilisation ===
In the past, various Turkic groups had come to rule in India, only to be later assimilated and became Indian in process. An example was the Mughal Empire, which was founded by a Timurid prince, Babur, came to rule India between 1526 to 1857 and was known internally as the Gurkani Empire. Although Turkic by roots, the dynasty became increasingly Indianised since the reign of Akbar, who solidified the empire's Central and South Asian fusion, before permanently lost their ability to speak the Chagatai language. Despite this, the Turkic expression persisted long after the Mughal demise in 1857, which the Indian Muslim identity often intertwined to that of Turkic world in some occasions, despite also being very distinctively South Asian in their own.

It's because of this basis that Turkey and Azerbaijan, in their selective form of pan-Turkism, have injected a highly controversial idea that South Asian civilisations were born and bred by Turks, despite the fact that most of these Turkic peoples had lost identities and only recognised themselves Indian. At the same time, both Ankara and Baku have very strained relations with India out of their appreciation for Pakistan, which itself was only created in 1947, causing their Turkification tended to overlook the diversity and cultural blending of Turkic rulers to wider Indian civilisation.

At the same time, this confusion of Muslim identity has sometimes affected various Muslim groups in India as they often reached Turkey to get blessing, which was criticised due to Turkey (and sometimes Azerbaijan)'s overtly racist nature.

=== Russian views on pan-Turkism ===
In Tsarist Russian circles, pan-Turkism was considered a political, irredentist and aggressive idea. Turkic peoples in Russia were threatened by Turkish expansion, and I. Gasprinsky and his followers were accused of being Turkish spies. After the October Revolution, the Bolsheviks’ attitude to Turkism differed significantly from the Russian Empire’s. At the 10th Congress of Bolshevik Communist Party in 1921, the party "condemned pan-Turkism as a slope to bourgeois-democratic nationalism", however unofficially pan-Turkism was supported and promoted. The emergence of a pan-Turkism scare in Soviet propaganda made it one of the “most frightening” political labels in the USSR. The most widespread accusation used in the repression of educated Tatars and other Turkic peoples during the 1930s was that of pan-Turkism.

=== In France and other Francophone countries ===
The idea has also been discussed in the Francophone world, noting that as victors in the First World War, England and France "dismembered the Arab portion" of the Ottoman Empire and shared it amongst themselves, further alienating Turkey. The loss of the Arabian oil fields limited Turkey becoming a petroleum power on the world stage; called "le panturquisme" in French, authors argue that it arose as a way of reclaiming some of the lost glory after the Ottoman defeat in the war and the loss of prestige in the region.

=== In the United States and the rest of the New World ===
Pan-Turkists like Reha Oğuz Türkkan have openly claimed that pre-Columbian civilizations were Turkic civilizations and they have also claimed that modern-day Native Americans are Turkic peoples, and activities which Turkish lobbying groups have conducted in order to draw Native Americans into the service of the wider Turkic world agenda have drawn criticism and triggered accusations that the Turkish government is falsifying the history of Native Americans in the service of Turkish imperialist ambitions. According to an article by Polat Kaya which was published by the Turkish Cultural Foundation, the exact origins of Native Americans remain unclear and while they are widely believed to have migrated from Asia, the exact connection between Native Americans and other Turkic peoples remains disputed.

=== In scientific term ===
Philip L. Kohl notes that the above-mentioned theories are nothing more than "incredible myths". Nevertheless, the promotion of these theories have "taken on large-scale proportions" in countries such as Turkey and Azerbaijan. Often associated with Greek, Assyrian and Armenian genocide denial, and deeply associated with Neo-Ottomanism and wider Turkic imperialism, pan-Turkic pseudoscience has received extensive state and state-backed non-governmental support, and is taught all the way from elementary school to the highest level of universities in such countries, and have recently expanded to even countries like Kazakhstan and Uzbekistan, alongside other Turkic groups elsewhere. Turkish and Azerbaijani students are imbued with textbooks which make "absurdly inflated" claims which state that all Eurasian nomads, including the Scythians, and all civilizations on the territory of the Ottoman Empire, such as Sumer, ancient Egypt, ancient Greece, and the Byzantine Empire, were of Turkic origin. Konstantin Sheiko and Stephen Brown explain the reemergence of such pseudo-history as a form of national therapy, helping its proponents cope with the failures of the past.

=== Criticism among other Turkic groups ===
There have been an increasing criticism among Central Asian Turks about pan-Turkism being more, or less, just a simply clouded version of Turkish imperialism promoted by Turkey and Azerbaijan, in a form of an Islamised "Oghuzification" of Turkic identity, while ignoring the complex history of Turkic peoples as a dispersed and divided groups with multiple ethnicities and religious affiliations like how Tuvans are Turkic Buddhists, or Gagauz being Turkic Christians; some have compared it to pan-Slavism, pan-Arabism, pan-Asianism, pan-Germanism and pan-Africanism — both failed because of unrealistic claims. Additionally, constant warfare between Turkic tribes and different civilisational paths, something that also occurred with the Arab, Slavic, Asian, Germanic and African groups, such as the war between Oghuz-led Ottoman Empire and Timurid Empire, or even the violent oppression of the supposedly "Altaic" Koreans by fellow "Altaic" Japanese during the 20th century, are also another focal point to question the motive of Turkic/Turan/Altaic unity with little recognition of the deep differences underneath; such criticism is also shared by numerous non-Central Asian scholars abroad.

A 2019 documentary about Gagauz people had raised this issue of this pan-Turkist ideology promoted by Turkey and Azerbaijan, as the Gagauz, due to their Christian faith, have suffered discrimination by other Turkic groups for being non-Muslims, plus their displacement from Anatolia and the Balkans due to Ottoman and Turkish policies.

== Notable pan-Turkists ==
- Abulfaz Elchibey
- Ahmet Ağaoğlu
- Ali bey Huseynzade
- Ali Suavi
- Alimardan bey Topchubashov
- Alparslan Türkeş
- Askar Akayev
- Ayaz İshaki
- Djemal Pasha
- Enver Pasha
- Fayzulla Xoʻjayev
- Fuat Köseraif
- Isa Alptekin
- Ismail Gasprinsky
- Mahammad Amin Rasulzade
- Mehmet Emin Yurdakul
- Mehmet Fuat Köprülü
- Mirsaid Sultan-Galiev
- Munis Tekinalp
- Mustafa Shokay
- Nejdet Sançar
- Nihal Atsız
- Nuri Killigil
- Omar Faig Nemanzadeh
- Ömer Seyfettin
- Rıza Nur
- Sadri Maksudi Arsal
- Talaat Pasha
- Timur Beg
- Reha Oğuz Türkkan
- Yusuf Akçura
- Zeki Velidi Togan
- Ziya Gökalp

== Pan-Turkist organizations ==
Azerbaijan

- Azerbaijan National Democrat Party
- Southern Azerbaijan National Awakening Movement (SANAM)
- Azerbaijan National Resistance Organization (ANRO)

Kazakhstan

- National Patriotic Party

Turkey

- Turkish Hearths
- National Party
- Nationalist Movement Party (MHP)
  - Grey Wolves
- Atsız Youth
- Victory Party
- İYİ Party
- Republican Villagers Nation Party
- Republican Nation Party
- Turkish Villagers' Party

Turkish Republic of Northern Cyprus (TRNC)

- Nationalist Democracy Party

Uzbekistan

- Birlik

== See also ==
- Altaic languages
- Chauvinism
- Ethnic nationalism
- Eurasianism
- Division of the Mongol Empire
- Historic states represented in Turkish presidential seal
- Hungarian Turanism
- Idel-Ural
- Inner Asia
- Jobbik
- Nationalist Movement Party
- Neo-Ottomanism
- Pan-nationalism
- Turya (Avesta)
- Turanid
- Turanism
- Turkic Council
- Turkism Day
- Turkic languages
- Turco-Mongols
- Tartary
- Ural–Altaic languages
