= Hikmet Tanyu =

Hikmet Tanyu (1918 – 1992) was a Turkish scientist and college professor specializing in philosophy and the history of religions, with a particular focus on Jewish religious history. In the 1970s, he pursued studies in Israel. Tanyu authored a book titled Jews and Turks throughout History, which examines the history of Jews and the relations between Jewish and Turkish societies over time. This book is widely regarded as the first comprehensive study of Jewish history in Turkey.

During the 1940s, Tanyu was a dedicated nationalist in the Republic of Turkey. He faced trial in the Racism-Turanism trials. Following six months' imprisonment, he was acquitted and released. Due to the torture he endured during his time in prison, he filed a lawsuit against the Turkish authorities at the Council of State.
