= Reha Oğuz Türkkan =

Turkish writer (born 1920)

- Born: 12 October 1920; Istanbul
- Died: 18 January 2010 (aged 89)
- Citizenship: Turkish
- Education: Lawyer
- Alma mater: Ankara University
- Occupation(s): Writer, journalist
- Movement: Pan-Turkism

Reha Oğuz Türkkan (born 12 October 1920, Istanbul – died 18 January 2010) was a Turkish academic, journalist and a leading ideologue of Turkish nationalism. During his lifetime, he published many books which focused on Turkish nationalism and Pan-Turkism. He was the grandnephew of Fakhri Pasha.

== Early life and education ==
He studied Law at the Ankara University and following his graduation, he worked at the Ministry of Justice.

== Publishing ==
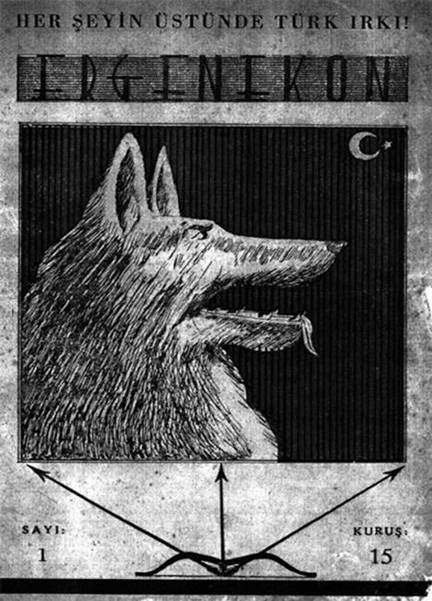
First issue of the Ergenekon

He began to publish the outlet Ergenekon on the 10 November 1938. The Ergenekon appeared only a few times, but it was an influential outlet for Pan-Turkism as it depicted a Bozkurt (the Grey Wolf) on every front-page as well as the slogans "The Turkish race above everything" or "The Turkish race above every other race". He was a fierce opponent of a fascist or communist ideology and claimed that the first country founded by race was Turkey and that it was not Nazi Germany under Adolf Hitler. He also published two other Pan-Turkist magazines called the Bozkurt (1939) and the Gök Börü (1942). In those magazines, he attempted to prove that the Turkish race was superior to other races due to the physical qualities and the historical accomplishments of the Turks.

== Views ==
He was in constant rivalry with Nihal Atsiz in defining the racial purity of Turkishness. Whereas Atsiz was more tolerant, Türkkan demanded a Turkish lineage of 9 generations. Nevertheless, he was convinced of the Turkish origin of the Native Americans and in 1999, he even wrote the book ‘Kızılderililer ve Türkler‘ (Native Americans and Turks) which focused on the subject. He led a group of racists who referred to themselves as the Bozkurtçu (In memory of the Grey Wolf) in the 1940s and was prosecuted but acquitted in the Racism Turanism trial. He defined Pan-Turkism as Turkish nationalism and as a vehicle for the establishment of a "national union" for all the Turkic people between Bulgaria to the Altai mountain range which then would strengthen Turkey as well.

== Personal life ==
He was the father of four children and was married twice. He died in January 2010 and was buried in the Zincirlikuyu Cemetery.

== Works ==
=== Novels ===
- 4 İçtimai Mesele, Arkadaş Matbaası, İstanbul, 1939
- Türkçülüğe Giriş, Arkadaş Matbaası, İstanbul, 1940
- Irk Muhite Tabi midir?, İstanbul, 1941
- (Race et Milieu), Paris, 1942
- Les Summeriens et les Rites Funéraires, Paris, 1942
- Les Armes Serétes, Paris-La République, 1943
- Milliyetçiliğe Doğru, İstanbul, 1943
- Solcular ve Kızıllar, İstanbul, 1943
- Kızıl Faaliyet, İstanbul, 1944
- Tabutluktan Gurbete, İstanbul, 1950-1974-1985
- İleri Türkçülük ve Partiler, Rafet Zaimler, İstanbul, 1947
- Correlation in Twin Psychology, New York, 1951
- One America, New York, 1951
- Talking Turkey, New York, 1955
- Turkish Literature, New York, 1956
- Türks in Retrospect, New York, 1956
- Conditioned Learning, New York, 1964
- Revolution in Education (Programmed Instruction & Multi-Media), New York, 1967
- Progr. Instruction Based Courses (Atoms & Electrons, French I, How to Recognize Names & Faces) Chicago
- Turkish National Character, New York, 1971
- Kitle Halinde İşlenen Suçlarda Cezai Mesuliyet ve Kitle Psikolojisi, İstanbul, 1974
- Pre-Columbian Americans & Turks-Cultura Turcica, 1975
- Türk'ün dışarıda kalan mirası (Avrupa bölümü: film-çekim Balkanlar)
- Psikoloji, Yaykur, Ankara, 1976
- İkna Psikolojisi, Ankara, 1976
- Eğitim Teknolojisi Planı, Ankara, 1976
- Yenilenmiş Türk Destanları ve Hikâyeler - "6 Minik Kitap ve Müzik Kaseti", 1977

=== Magazines ===
- Milli Kültür Magazine, 1975
- Kızıl Derililer ve Türkler, Hürriyer, 1996

=== Movies (production, direction and script) ===
- To be Born Again, 1970
- Rions Ensemble (On Turkish humor), 1973
- First steps of the Moon (Live shot and interpretation of the first landing on the Moon)
- Türk Çocukları İçin (Turkish culture for children abroad), 1974
- Öyle bir Özleyiş ki (Director Reha Oğuz Türkkan and Yücel Çakmaklı, Scenario Reha Oğuz Türkkan), 1977
- Stranger in Paradise (tourist documentary), 1977
- İpek Kadife, 1978
- Too Early for Death (NBC-N.Y.) (Ölüm için çok erken), 1954 (Scenario only)
- İçtiğimiz Çay, 1976 (Scenario only)
- Altın Yumurta, 1976 (Scenario only)
