= Turkish language reform =

1932–1982 government language campaign

The Turkish language reform (Turkish: Dil Devrimi), initiated on 12 July 1932, aimed to purge the Turkish language of Arabic and Persian-derived words and grammatical rules, transforming the language into a more vernacular form suitable for the Republic of Turkey.

Under the leadership of president Mustafa Kemal Atatürk, the reform commenced and persisted with varying degrees of intensity and momentum until the 1970s, following the most profound period of transformation between 1932 and 1938. The closure of the former Turkish Language Association in 1982 was officially recognized as the end of the language reform. Aligned with the alphabet reform in 1928, the language reform stands as one of the fundamental pillars of the significant structural alterations undergone by the Turkish language in the 20th century.

== History ==
=== Karamanid era ===
In 1277, Mehmet I of Karaman issued a firman making the Old Anatolian Turkish the official language in an attempt to break the dominance of Persian. The former later developed into Ottoman Turkish language.

=== Ottoman era ===
During interactions with Arabic and Persian-speaking nations, Turks adopted words not present in their own language. Alongside these absent words, however, Turkish words gradually lost their functionality over time, yielding to Arabic and Persian vocabulary. For instance, the Turkic-origin word "od" meaning "fire" gave way to the Persian-origin word "ateş". Not only words but also grammatical rules and constructions were borrowed from both languages. Nevertheless, at the core, Turkish inflections and grammar rules were still used. The Ottoman Empire was governed from the Sublime Porte ("Bâb-ı Âlî" in Ottoman Turkish, borrowed from Arabic الباب العالي "Bab Al-A'li"), where "bâb" meaning "door" in Arabic combined with the Persian-origin possessive suffix (ezāfe) "-ı" and the Persian word "âlî" meaning "high" to form a new word in Ottoman Turkish. There was a gap between written and spoken language to the extent that newspapers, not understood by large segments of society, struggled to sell, leading journalists to seek ways to simplify their language. For example, they found it more comprehensible to use "Tabii İlimler" (natural sciences) instead of the Arabic term "Ulûm-i Tabiiyye" and resorted to such simplifications in their writings.

The issue of simplifying the written language by purging it of complex Arabic and Persian expressions and bringing it closer to spoken Turkish had concerned Turkish writers since the Tanzimat period. The trend toward simplification, which began with İbrahim Şinasi and Namık Kemal, made significant progress with Ahmet Mithat and reached its peak during the Second Constitutional Era with writers like Ömer Seyfettin and Mehmet Emin Yurdakul.

The 1910s witnessed the rise of Turkist and Turanist views within organizations such as the Turkish Hearths and the Committee of Union and Progress. During this period, new ideas began to be incorporated into the simplificationist perspective. Among these, the most influential was the idea of borrowing words from other Turkic languages, particularly the ancient written languages of Central Asia, besides the Istanbul Turkish. The publication of French orientalist Abel Pavet de Courteille's Chagatai Dictionary in 1870, the deciphering and publication of the Orkhon inscriptions in 1896, and the printing of Dīwān Lughāt al-Turk in 1917 provided abundant resources for this approach.

There was also a tendency circa 1914 to derive new words from existing Turkish roots to express new concepts.

=== Republican era ===
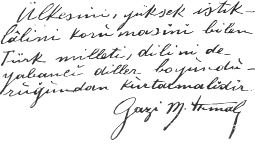
Handwritten version of the last sentence of Atatürk's speech in 1930

Views on language modernization receded during the period of the War of Independence and the early years of the republic. Prior to 1931, there was no clear stance on this matter from Mustafa Kemal Atatürk. However, with the establishment of the Turkish Language Association in 1932, the language reform gained momentum. In the opening speech of the parliament in 1932, Atatürk expressed caution regarding the language reform by stating, "We will ensure the rise of national culture by opening up all avenues. We expect all our national organizations to be cautious and engaged in enabling the Turkish language to regain its essence and beauty".

One of the primary interests of Atatürk was history, while the other was language. Like many intellectuals, he perceived problems in the state of the Turkish language. In 1932, he founded the "Turkish Language Research Society" (Turkish: Türk Dili Tetkik Cemiyeti). Within this society, various subcommittees were established, each assigned with different aspects of the language under what seemed like a "military" organization (linguistics, etymology, grammar, terminology, lexicography, etc.). One of the tasks of this society was to research words in the language and find Turkish alternatives for foreign loanwords. Word search operations were initiated under the chairmanship of governors in every province. Within a year, a source of 35,000 new words was created. During this time, scientists also researched 150 old works and collected words never before used in the Turkish language. In 1934, the 90,000-word search dictionary was compiled and published. Suggestions for alternative words used in local dialects were proposed instead of the Arabic-origin word "kalem" (pen), such as "yağuş, yazgaç, çizgiç, kavrı, kamış, yuvuş" and for the word "akıl" (mind), 26 suggestions were received, while for "hediye" (gift), 77 suggestions were made. Eventually, the Turkish-origin word "armağan" was chosen in place of the word "hediye".

However, this process of "purging the language of foreign loanwords" only affected words from eastern-origin languages (Arabic, Persian, etc.) while foreign loanwords of western origin were not subjected to this process to the same extent. Moreover, many loanwords from Western languages were added to Turkish to fill the gaps left by the purged words.

The work of the "Language Council", initiated in 1929, culminated in the establishment of the "Turkish Language Research Society" founded by Atatürk in 1932. This society sought to remove what Atatürk and others viewed as the "yoke" of foreign languages on Turkish and return it to its essence, as well as to eliminate the distinction between spoken and written language to reduce the barriers to reading and writing for non-elites. This would be achieved by finding and coining Turkish equivalents for borrowed constructions, including through surveys of local dialects.

The simplification of the Turkish lexicon over time led to Turkification, and attempts to replace foreign-origin loanwords used in literary works with sometimes conditioning words that did not even conform to Turkish language rules, posed a risk of the language being disconnected from its cultural and historical sources.

=== Turkish Language Congresses ===
The reform was shaped in large part through a series of congresses (Turkish: Türk Dili Kurultayları) convened between 1932 and 1936, which served both as scholarly forums and as vehicles for state-directed language policy.

==== First Turkish Language Congress (1932) ====
The First Turkish Language Congress was held shortly after the founding of the Turkish Language Research Society (Türk Dili Tetkik Cemiyeti, TDTC). The congress was chaired by the speaker of the Grand National Assembly, Kazım Paşa. Its opening address was delivered by Samih Rıfat, who framed the language reform as part of the broader Westernization process. A defining feature of the congress was that its proceedings focused exclusively on purging Arabic and Persian loanwords, while loanwords of Western origin were not addressed. The congress also established the charter and central committee of the TDTC. Jacob M. Landau characterized the congress as an explicit break with the Ottoman and Islamic past.

==== Second Turkish Language Congress (1934) ====
In preparation for the Second Turkish Language Congress, the organizers adopted two notable procedural decisions. First, under article 11 of the congress rules, titled "The Course of Discussions at the Congress", it was stipulated that since the congress was in principle devoted to presenting scholarly theses, debate and disagreement would not form part of the proceedings. Second, under article 6, participation in discussions was restricted to government officials, scientists, and members of the society.

The congress opened with a speech by Education Minister Abidin, who situated the reform within the Kemalist history thesis, asserting that major turning points in world history were created by the Turkish character and that Turkish civilization was the origin of human civilizations. A prominent topic at the congress was the alleged relationship between Turkish and Indo-European and Semitic languages. The newly elected Secretary-General İbrahim Necmi stated that comparing Turkish with Indo-European languages would require years of research, and cited Sami Ali's etymological comparisons between Turkish and Celtic languages.

Between the congresses, the central committee devoted much of its effort to finding Turkish equivalents for Arabic and Persian words, producing the Cep Kılavuzları ("pocket guides") published in 1935 by the TDTC. The preface of the guide acknowledged that not all words it contained were the product of the institution's own research—where no existing equivalent could be found, new words had been coined.

==== Third Turkish Language Congress (1936) ====
The Third Congress was convened in the summer of 1936 with international participation. Before the congress opened, foreign representatives, the organizing committee, and members of the language and history institutions were received by the President at the palace, where the discussion focused on the newly advanced Sun Language Theory. The theory dominated the congress programme; Western representatives refrained from criticizing it openly, instead presenting their papers on different topics.

In his address, the Secretary-General İbrahim Necmi Dilmen reported that 6,075 words had been replaced between 1934 and 1936. With further replacements in subsequent years, the total number of changed words reached 32,316.

== Word derivations ==
Most of the new Turkish words are derived from other words with thematic suffixes. For example:

bat- is the root of the verb batmak, which means "to sink" or "to set". The derived word batı means "west" or the cardinal direction in which the sun "sinks". Another example would be aylık, which means "salary" as well as monthly. This is derived from the word ay, which means "moon, month".

Here are some other examples of derivations:

- gün means "day" → günce means "agenda", güncel means "current", gündem means "current events and news", güncellemek means "to update", günay means "date", güney means "south", güneş means "sun", günlük means "diary" or "daily", gündüz means "daytime" (opposite of night) or "morning",
- kes- is the root of the verb "to cut" → kesi means "incision", kesici means "cutter", kesin means "accurate", kesinlikle means "definitely", kesinleşmek means "to become definite", kesinsizlik means "the state of indefinity", keskenmek means "to pretend to hit with a hand motion", kesmece is a saying that means "the agreement of cutting a fruit before buying it", keser means "adze", kesiklik means "sudden feeling of tiredness, lethargy", kesilmek means "to act like something", kesit means "cross section", keski means "chisel", keskin means "sharp", keskinlik means "acuity" and "sharpness", kesim means "segment", kesimlik means "animal (or tree) fit or ready to be slaughtered/cut", kesinti means "interruption", kesintili means "on and off", kesintisiz means "uninterrupted" and "seamless", kesme means "an object cut in the form of a geometrical shape", kestirme means "short-cut", kesik means "interrupted", kestirmek means "to forecast" and "to nap", kestirim means "guess", kesen means "a line that intersects a geometrical entity", kesenek means "deduction", kesişmek means "to intersect", kesişim means "intersection",
- sap- is the root of the verb "to deviate" → sapık means "pervert", sapak means "turn" (as in roads, traffic),
- duy- is the root of the verb "to hear", "to feel" → duyu means "sensory", duyarlı means "sensitive", duyarlılık means "sensitivity", duygu means "feeling", duyarga(ç) means "sensor", duyargan means "allergen", duyarca means "allergy", duyum means "hearsay", duyumsamazlık means "apathy",
- yet- is the root of the verb "to suffice" → yeter means "sufficient", yetki means "authority", yetenek means "talent",
- başka means "other" → başkalaşım means "metamorphosis",
- tek means "single" → tekel means "monopoly", tekdüze means "monotonous",
- ev means "home" → evlilik means "marriage", evcil means "domestic",
- seç- is the root of the verb "to choose" → seçenek means "choice", seçkin means "elite", seçim means "election",
- düş- is the root of the verb "to fall" → düşük means "miscarriage",
- sür- is the root of the verb "to last", "to put forward" → süreğen means "chronic", sürüm means "version",
- yaz- is the root of the verb "to write" → yazar means "writer", yazgı means "fate", yazılım means "software", yazanak means "report", yazıt means "inscription", yazman means "secretary", yazıcı means "printer", yazın means "literature", yazım means "orthography", yazışma means "correspondence", yazdırım means "dictation",
- ver- is the root of the verb "to give" → veri means "data", vergi means "tax", verim means "efficiency",
- öz means "self", "real" → özel means "special", özen means "attention", özgü means "peculiar", özgül means "specific", özge means "other", özne means "subject", özgün means "original", özgür means "free", özümleme means "assimilation", öznel means "subjective". The verb özle- (meaning "to miss", "to long for") is also derived from this word, and özlem is a noun that means "longing".

Some of the Turkish words are also compound words, such as:

- Başvuru means "application". It is derived from baş (meaning "head") and vuru (meaning "hitting"), so the literal English translation of this compound word is "head-hitting"
- Ayak means "foot", and kap means "container", and the compound word ayakkabı means foot-container, "shoe".
- Ana means "main", and yasa means "law", and the compound word anayasa means "constitution".
- Öz means "self", and veri means "giving", and the compound word özveri means "altruism, self-sacrifice".
- Büyük means "big", and elçi means "messenger", and the compound word büyükelçi means "ambassador".
- Kesim means "cutting", ev means "house", and kesimevi means "slaughterhouse".

== Öztürkçe ==
Öztürkçe refers to a purist form of Turkish, which is largely free of Persian and Arab influences. Öztürkçe was an active target of the Turkish language reform. This language policy of Turkification was enforced by the written reform and from 1932 by the Turkish Language Association (TDK). The TDK collected for this purpose Turkic wordings in historical sources and Anatolian dialects. On this basis, the TDK formed a large number of neologisms that were disseminated using media and textbooks. From the 1940s, the TDK developed normative dictionaries (Türkçe Sözlük) and spelling guides (Yazım kılavuzu).

The use of Öztürkçe was and is an indicator for the world view of Kemalism.

For several decades, no active policy of language regulation has been in place.

== Atatürk's Geometri book ==
In the preface to the 1971 edition of Atatürk's Geometri book, written by Agop Dilâçar, the story of the book's creation is recounted. In the autumn of 1936, Atatürk sent his private secretary Süreyya Anderiman along with Agop Dilaçar to the Haşet bookstore in Beyoğlu and had them purchase French geometry books. During the winter of 1936, Atatürk worked on the book and produced a 44-page volume in which geometry terms were modified and translated into Turkish. The authorship of the book by Atatürk is not explicitly stated; only a note on the cover indicates that it was published by the Ministry of Culture as a guide for those teaching geometry and those intending to write books on the subject.

During the Ottoman era, the terminology used in geometry textbooks taught in schools was distant from the daily language of the people and often incomprehensible. Terms such as "müselles" for triangle, "mesaha-i sathiye" for area, "zaviye-i kaime" for right angle, and "kaide irtifaı" for height were used.

English	Ottoman Turkish	Modern Turkish
triangle	مثلث müselles	üçgen
rectangle	مستطيل mustatil	dikdörtgen
square	مربع murabba	kare
area	مساحه سطحيه mesâha-i sathiyye	alan
right angle	زاویۀ‌ قائمه zaviye-i kaime	dik açı
height	قاعده ارتفاع kaide irtifaı	yükseklik
The area of a triangle is equal to half the product of its base and height.	.بر مثلثڭ مساحه سطحیهسی ، قاعدهسینڭ ارتفاعنا حاصل ضربینڭ نصفنه مساويدر; Bir müsellesin mesâha-i sathiyyesi, kaidesinin irtifaına hâsıl-ı zarbinin nısfına müsavidir.	Bir üçgenin alanı, taban uzunluğu ile yüksekliğinin çarpımının yarısına eşittir.

The terms coined by Atatürk are used unchanged in the Turkish curriculum today.

== Aftermath ==
The replacement process attracted criticism from various intellectuals, educators, physicians, and researchers, notably Peyami Safa, Ahmet Hamdi Tanpınar, Necip Fazıl Kısakürek, and Yahya Kemal Beyatlı, during its implementation along with the ensuing decades. The latter was a premier champion of the Yaşayan Türkçe (Living Turkish) doctrine, maintaining that public usage and comprehension automatically render a word naturally Turkish. Safa advocated for the instruction of the Arabic script in schools to facilitate the study of Ottoman history.

== See also ==
- Turkish alphabet reform
- Turkish Language Association
- Linguistic purism
- List of replaced loanwords in Turkish
