= Hasan Reşit Tankut =

Turkish politician

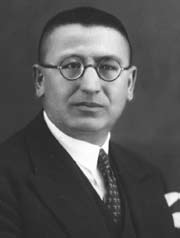

Member of the Grand National Assembly
- In office 1931–1935
- Constituency: Muş
- In office 1935–1950
- Constituency: Maraş (1935, 1940,1945,1950)
- In office 1950–1954
- Constituency: Hatay
- In office 1957–1960
- Constituency: Mardin

Personal details
- Born: 1893 Maraş
- Died: 1980 (aged 86–87)
- Occupation: Politician
- Profession: Lecturer

Hasan Reşit Tankut (1891–1980) was a Turkish politician and professor. He was a member of the Grand National Assembly of Turkey and a co-founder of the Turkish Language Association.

== Early life and education ==
He was born in Maraş in 1891, and after his father's death he was raised for some years by Seydo Aĝa, who has been described as an Alevi Kurd. During the end of his studies at the high school in Damascus in 1908, made aware of the differences of Arabic and Turkish language, he decided to put more importance in the use of the Turkish one. He then studied law and political sciences in Damascus. Later he fought as a volunteer during the First World War and the Independence War. Afterwards, Mustafa Kemal appointed him as an adviser to the Order in the Provinces of the East in 1925 and as the Generalinspector of the Turkish Hearths in 1926. Also on Atatürk's call, he taught History at the Ankara University from 1936 to 1940.

== Academic career ==
In 1935, he and other representatives of the Turkish Language Association, were involved in the development of the Sun Language Theory. He was also a supporter of the Turkish History Thesis as well as the Turkification campaign of the Government of Kemal Atatürk. In 1937, upon Atatürk's demand, Tankut attended an Anthropology and Archaeology Conference in Bucharest, to introduce the Sun Language Theory. Apart from being a founder of the Turkish Language Association, he was also the head of its etymology branch.

As an inspector for the Turkish Hearths he received free access to the Kurdish provinces, and he used this freedom for his studies. On the sixth congress of the Turkish Hearths in 1926, he made public that during his journeys he has seized several books in many non-Turkish languages. In 1940 on another journey which included visiting Bitlis, he noticed with satisfaction that the Sharafname of the Kurdish author Sharaf Khan Bidlisi was not read anymore by the local population. In 1961 he supported the idea to settle Turks in between Kurds and Zazas in order to make them more available to turkification. During his lifetime he published several ethnological studies about the Zazas, Kurds and the Alevis, and books about the Sun Language Theory.

== Political career ==
He also served several terms in the Grand National Assembly of Turkey as a representative for the provinces Muş, (1931-1935), Maraș(1935-1950), Hatay (1950-1954), and Mardin (1957-1960). In 1940 he undertook a journey to the provinces of Siirt, Van, Bitlis and Muş in order to secure the loyalty of the population in the case an eventual participation in the World War II. He doubted that the Kurdish speaking population would stay loyal to the Turkish Republic in that case.
