= Genetic studies on Turkish people =

DNA analysis of Turkish populations

Population genetics research has been conducted on the ancestry of the modern Turkish people (not to be confused with Turkic peoples) in Turkey. Such studies are relevant for the demographic history of the population as well as health reasons, such as for studying population-specific diseases. Some studies have sought to determine the relative genetic contributions of the Turkic peoples of Central Asia, from where the Seljuk Turks began migrating to Anatolia after the Battle of Manzikert in 1071, which led to the establishment of the Anatolian Seljuk Sultanate in the late 11th century, and prior populations in the area who were culturally assimilated during the Seljuk and the Ottoman periods.

Turkish genomic variation, along with several other West Asian populations, looks most similar to genomic variation of Southern European populations such as southern Italians. West Asian genomes, including Turkish ones, have been greatly influenced by early agricultural populations in the area; later population movements, such as those of Turkic speakers, also contributed. However, the genetic variation of various populations in Central Asia "has been poorly characterized"; Western Asian populations may also be "closely related to populations in the east".

Multiple studies have found similarities or common ancestry between Turkish people and present-day or historic populations in the Mediterranean, West Asia, and the Caucasus. Several studies have also found some Central Asian contributions.

== Central Asian geneflow ==
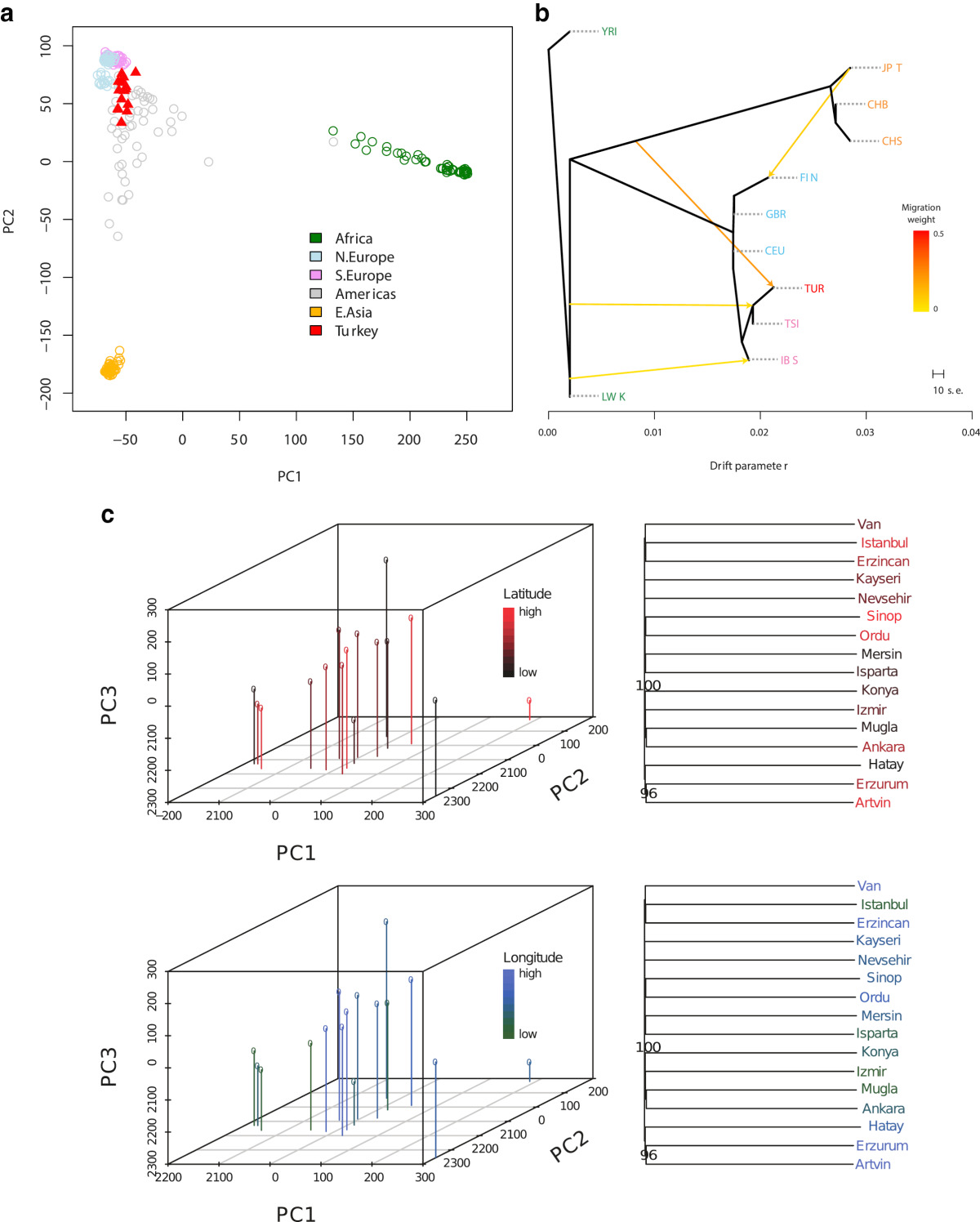
Whole genome sequencing of Turkish individuals. (b) shows a tree analysis. Turkey, TUR; Tuscans, TSI; Iberian, IBS; British, GBR; Finnish, FIN; European-American, CEU; Northern Han Chinese, CHB; Japanese, JPT; Southern Han Chinese, CHS; Yoruba, YRI; Luhya, LWK. Weight of the migration event predicted to originate from the East Asian branch into Turkey is 0.217; from the ancestral Eurasian branch into the Turkey-Tuscan branch, 0.048; from the African branch into Iberia, 0.026, from the Japanese branch into Finland, 0.079.

Several studies have investigated to what extent a gene flow from Central Asia to Anatolia contributed to the gene pool of the Turkish people and the role of the 11th-century settlement by Oghuz Turks. Central Asia is home to numerous populations that "demonstrate an array of mixed anthropological features of East Eurasians (EEA) and West Eurasians (WEA)"; two studies showed Uyghurs have 40-53% ancestry classified as East Asian, with the rest being classified as European; another study put the European-related ancestry at 36%. A 2018 autosomal single-nucleotide polymorphism study suggested that Eurasian Steppe slowly transitioned from Indo-European and Iranian-speaking groups with largely western Eurasian ancestry to increasing East Asian ancestry with Turkic and Mongolic groups in the past 4,000 years, including extensive Turkic migrations out of Mongolia and slow assimilation of local populations.

Two earlier (2000 and 2002) studies suggested that, although the Turks' settlement of Anatolia was of cultural importance, including the introduction of the Turkish language and Islam, the genetic contribution from Central Asia may have been slight. A 2020 global study looking at whole-genome sequences showed that Turks have relatively lower within-population shared identical-by-descent genomic fragments compared to the rest of the world, suggesting mixture of remote populations.

A 2003 study found that some Xiongnu remains from Mongolia had paternal and maternal genetic lineages that have also been found in people from modern-day Turkey. Most (89%) of the Xiongnu sequences in this study belonged to Asian maternal haplogroups, however other studies have shown a significantly higher frequency of West Eurasian maternal and paternal haplogroups in Xiongnu samples, indicating a diverse population. Contact between West and East Eurasian populations pre-dates the Xiongnu period.

A study published in 2003 looked at human leukocyte antigen genes to investigate the affinity of certain Mongolian tribes with Germans and Anatolian Turks. It was found that Germans and Anatolian Turks were equally distant to the Mongolian populations. No close relationship was found between Anatolian Turks and Mongolians despite the history of contact and mutual influence between Turkic and Mongolic peoples.

A study of 75 individuals from various parts of Turkey concluded that the "genetic structure of the mitochondrial DNAs in the Turkish population bears some similarities to Turkic Central Asian populations".

A 2001 study comparing the populations of Mediterranean Europe and Turkic-speaking peoples of Central Asia estimated the Central Asian genetic contribution to current Anatolian Y-chromosome loci (one binary and six short tandem repeat) and mitochondrial DNA gene pool to be roughly 30%. A 2004 high-resolution SNP analysis of Y-chromosomal DNA in samples collected from blood banks, sperm banks, and university students in eight regions of Turkey found evidence for a weak but detectable signal (<9%) of recent paternal gene flow from Central Asia. However, this received serious criticism for not including non-East Eurasian Central Asian lineages, such as specific R1 and J clades, which are commonly found in Western Turkic populations. A 2006 study concluded that the true Central Asian contributions to Anatolia was 13% for males and 22% for females (with wide ranges of confidence intervals), and the language replacement in Turkey and might not have been in accordance with the elite dominance model. It was later observed that the male contribution from Central Asia to the Turkish population with reference to the Balkans was 13%. For all non-Turkic speaking populations, the Central Asian contribution was higher than in Turkey. According to the study, "the contributions ranging between 13%–58% must be considered with a caution because they harbor uncertainties about the state of pre-nomadic invasion and further local movements."

In a 2015 study, Turkish samples were in the West Eurasian clade which consisted of "all of mainland Europe, Sardinia, Sicily, Cyprus, western Russia, the Caucasus, Turkey, and Iran, and some individuals from Tajikistan and Turkmenistan." In this study, ancestry from East Asia was also visible in Turkish samples, with events after 1000 CE generally involving Asian sources being important when it comes to the ancestry of Turkey and its region.

As of 2017, Central Asian genetic variation has been poorly studied, with little or no whole genome sequencing data for countries such as Turkmenistan and Afghanistan. Therefore, future comprehensive genome-wide studies are needed. Turkish people, and other West Asian populations, may also be closely related to Central Asian populations such as those near West Asia.

A 2022 archaeogenetic study by Lazaridis et al., analyzing 58 individuals originally sourced from a 1995 study across six Turkish cities, used two-way ADMIXTURE analysis of East Eurasian ancestry to track Central Asian input into Anatolia. This ancestry was absent (0%) in Byzantine-era Anatolian individuals, but present at approximately 9% in present-day Turks and approximately 18% in a transitional population of the 14th–17th centuries from the Aegean coastal site of Çapalıbağ. Modelling present-day Turks and the Çapalıbağ population as mixtures of Roman/Byzantine-era Anatolians and Central Asians, the authors estimated that admixture occurred about 12 generations (roughly 340 years) before the Çapalıbağ individuals' time and about 30 generations (roughly 860 years) ago for present-day Turks—dates they linked to the arrival and expansion of the Seljuk Turks in Anatolia from the late 11th century onward. In this model the local, non–Central Asian component of present-day Turkish ancestry was represented by Roman/Byzantine-era Anatolians, and the authors placed the overall Central Asian Turkic contribution at roughly 9–22%.

== Haplogroup distributions ==
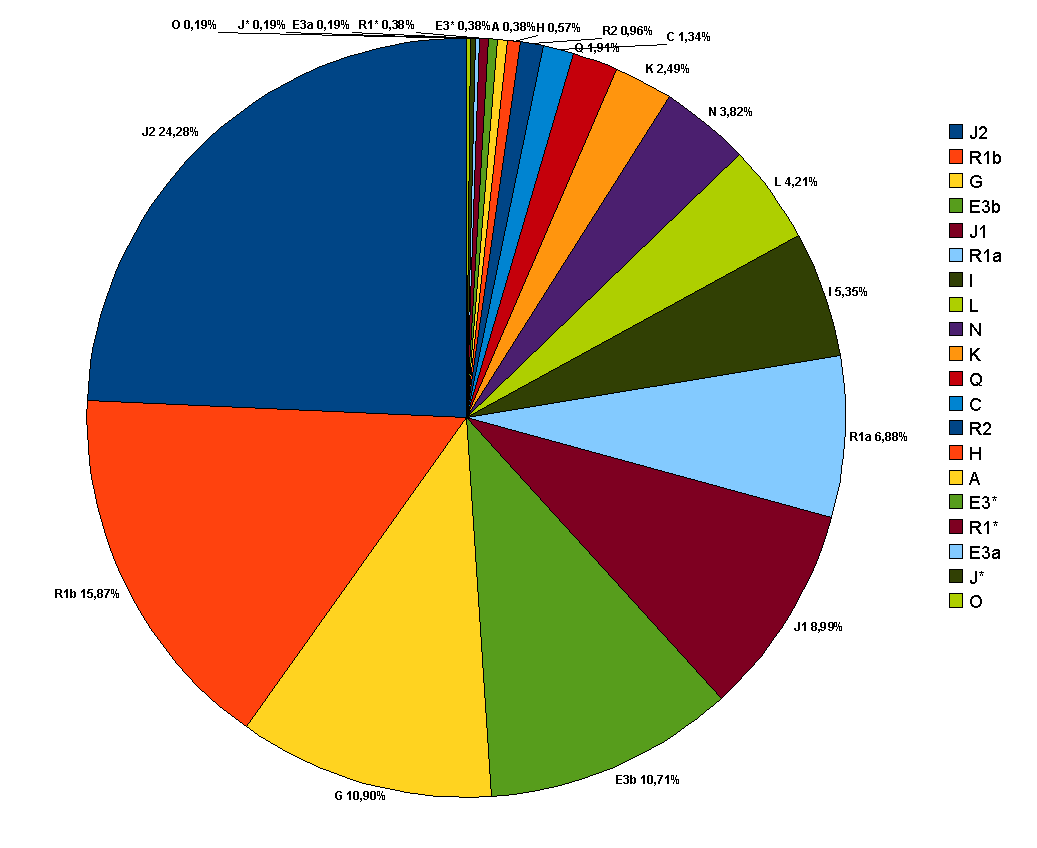
Y chromosome haplogroup distribution of Turkish people

A 2021 study which looked at whole genomes and whole-exomes of 3,362 Anatolian people found that the most common Y chromosome haplogroups were J2a, R1b, and R1a (18.4%, 14.9%, and 12.1% respectively). Haplogroups C-M130 and O3 ranged from 8.5% to 15.6%. Most common mtDNA haplogroups were H, U, and T (27.55%, 19.53%, and 10.99% respectively).

An earlier 2004 study of 523 people found many Y-DNA haplogroups in Turkey. Most haplogroups in Turkey are shared with its West Asian and Caucasian neighbors. The most common haplogroup in Turkey is J2 (24%), which is widespread among Mediterranean, Caucasian, and West Asian populations. Haplogroups that are common in Europe (R1b and I; 20%), South Asia (L, R2, H; 5.7%), and Africa (A, E3*, E3a; 1%) are also present. By contrast, Central Asian haplogroups (C, Q, and O) are rarer. While, K, R1a, R1b, and L infrequently occur in Central Asia, they are notable in many other Western Turkic groups. J2 is also found in Central Asia, a notably high frequency (30.4%) being observed among Uzbeks.

However, because the dataset relies on low-resolution macro-haplogroups, attempting to quantify paternal flow from Turkic-related Central Asian migrations yields a highly ambiguous range. By excluding branches that are very unlikely to stem from these migrations and including those that potentially do, the contribution spans from 8.6% to 55.5%. The 8.6% minimum includes definitively East Eurasian and Central Asian clades (C*-M216, C3-M217, N*-M231, N3a-M178, O3-M122, Q*-M242, Q2-M25, R1b2-M73). The 55.5% maximum also includes clades with less certain origins, including some J, G, R1a, and R1b markers, which occur in Central Asia but are also found among indigenous West Asian populations. Thus, this paper is of limited use for determining the actual extent of Turkic migration, since the broad macro-haplogroup categories cannot reliably distinguish Central Asian ancestry introduced by Turkic migrations from lineages already present in West Asia.

The main percentages of Y chromosome haplogroups identified in the 2004 study were as follows:

- J2: 24%. J2 (M172) may reflect the spread of Anatolian farmers. J2-M172 is "mainly confined to the Mediterranean coastal areas, southeastern Europe and Anatolia", as well as West Asia and Central Asia.
- R1b: 15.9%. R1b is found mainly in Europe, also West Asia, Central Asia, Southern Asia, some parts of the Sahel region of Africa.
- G: 10.9%. Haplogroup G has also been associated with the spread of agriculture (together with J2 clades) and is "largely restricted to populations of the Caucasus and the Near/Middle East and southern Europe." The G2a subclade in particular is associated with the Early European Farmers, who in turn descend from the Anatolian farmers.
- E3b-M35: 10.7% (E3b1-M78 and E3b3-M123 accounting for all E representatives in the sample, besides a single E3b2-M81 chromosome). E-M78 is common along a line from the Horn of Africa via Egypt to the Balkans. Haplogroup E-M123 is found in both Africa and Eurasia.
- J1: 9%
- R1a: 6.9%
- I: 5.3%
- K: 4.5%
- L: 4.2%
- N: 3.8%
- T: 2.5%
- Q: 1.9%
- C: 1.3%
- R2: 0.96%

Other markers that occurred in less than 1% are H, A, E3a, O, and R1*.

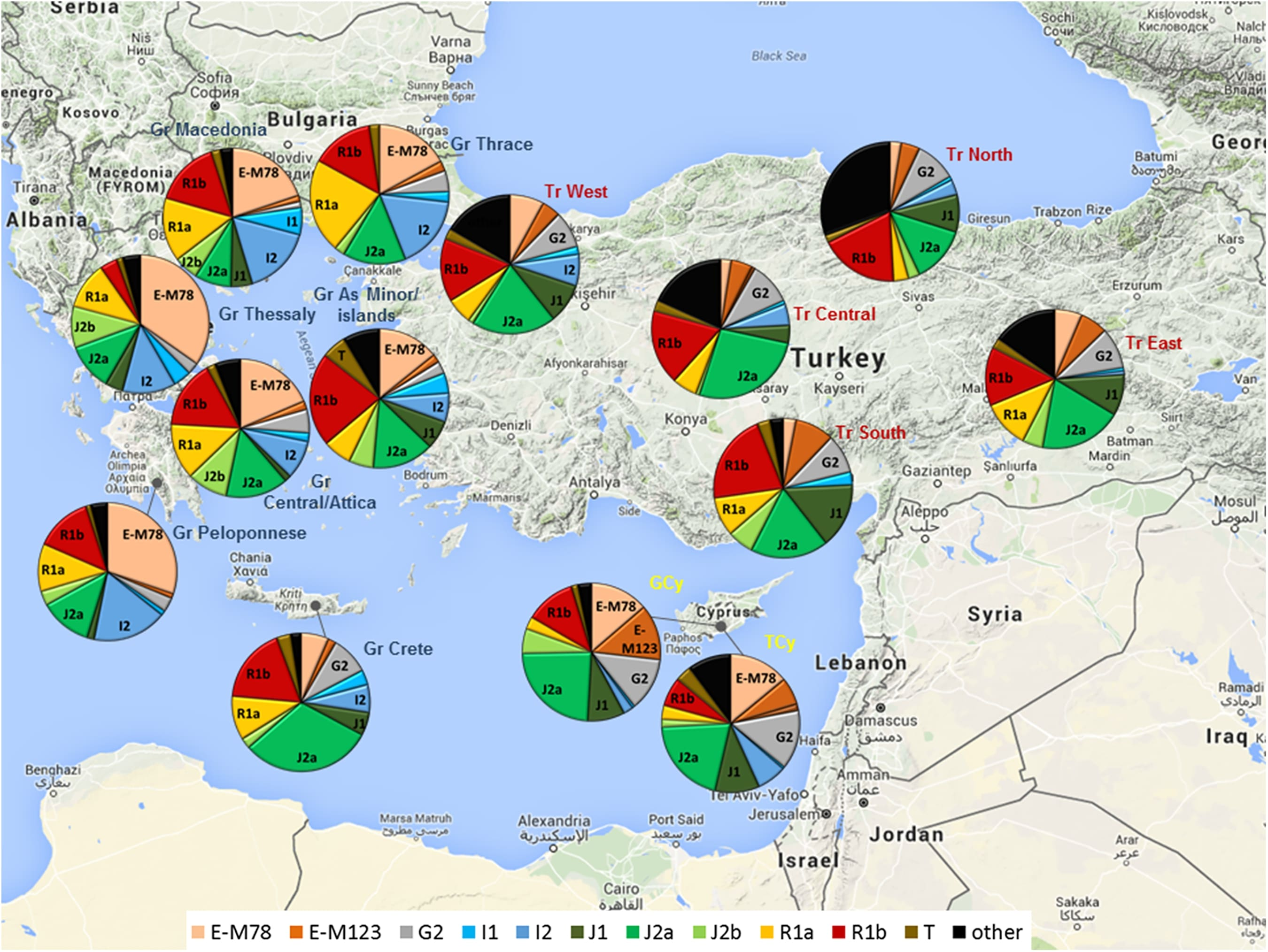
Y-DNA comparison of Turkish and Greek-speaking populations of Cyprus, Anatolia, Thrace, the Aegean, and peninsular Greece (Citation: Heraclides et al. 2017 Y-chromosomal analysis of Greek Cypriots reveals a primarily common pre-Ottoman paternal ancestry with Turkish Cypriots. PLoS ONE 12(6): e0179474. doi:10.1371/journal.pone.0179474

A 2011 study took into account oral histories and historical records. The researchers went to four settlements in Central Anatolia and chose a random selection of subjects from among university students.

In an Afshar village near Ankara where, according to oral tradition, the ancestors of the inhabitants came from Central Asia, the researchers found that 57% of the villagers had haplogroup L, 13% had haplogroup Q and 3% had haplogroup N. The high rate of haplogroup L observed in this study, which is most common in South Asia, was difficult for researchers to explain and could not be traced back to any specific geographic location, and authors said it would be difficult to associate this haplogroup with the Turkic migrations, given the paucity of evidence. Furthermore, 10% of the Afshars had haplogroups E3a and E3b, while only 13% had haplogroup J2a, the most common in Turkey.

By contrast, the inhabitants of a traditional Turkish village that had little migration had about 25% haplogroup N and 25% J2a, with 3% G and close to 30% R1 variants (mostly R1b).

== Whole genome sequencing ==
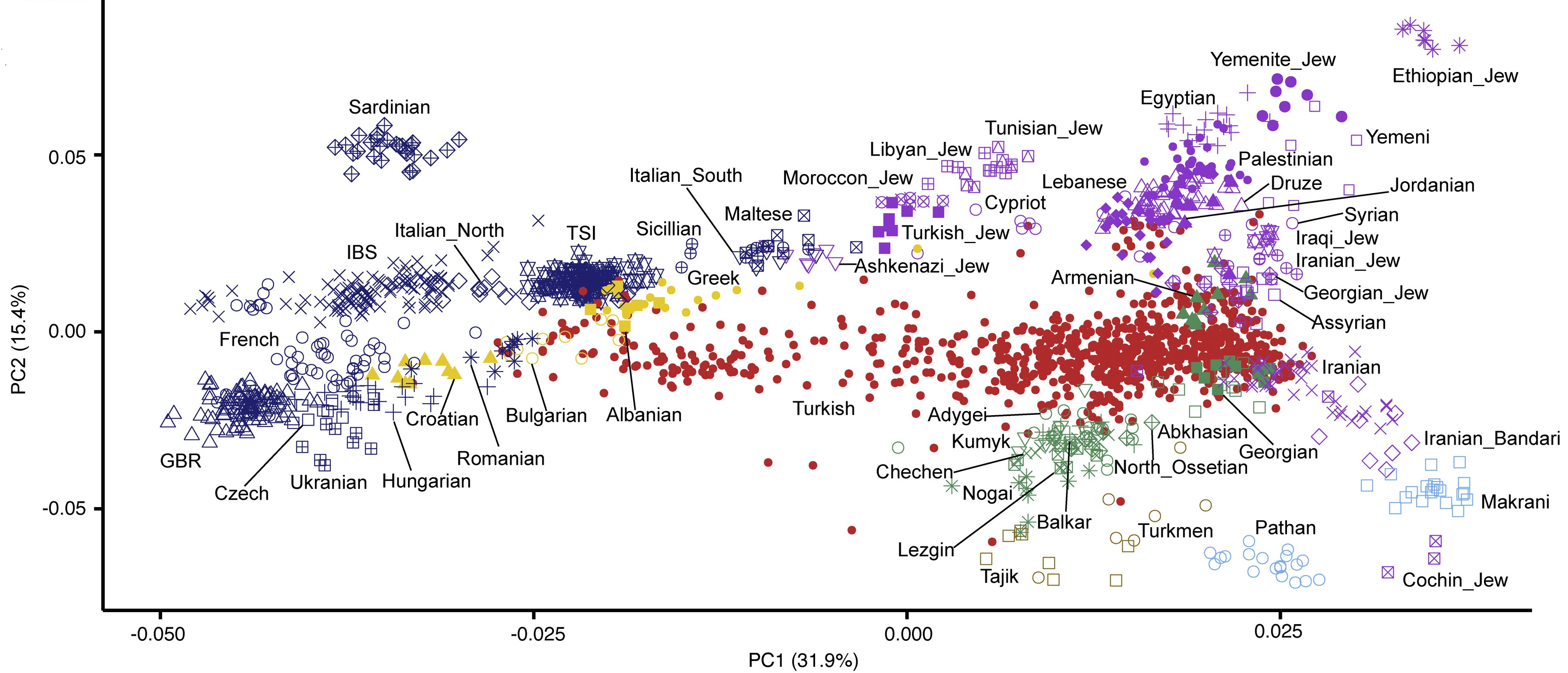
Principal component (PC) analysis (PCA) of Turkish individuals in comparison to the Near East and Europe.

A whole-genome sequencing study of Turkish genetics, conducted on 16 individuals, concluded that the Turkish population forms a cluster with Southern European and Mediterranean populations and that the predicted contribution from ancestral East Asian populations is 21.7% (presumably reflecting a Central Asian origin). However, that does not provide a direct estimate of a migration rate, because of factors such as the unknown original contributing populations. Given Europeans and Native Americans may share Ancient North Eurasian ancestry, "significant Ancient North Eurasian ancestry might also be found in Turkish genetic profiles; this requires further study".

Another study in 2021, which looked at whole-genomes and whole-exomes of 3,362 unrelated Turkish samples, resulted in establishing the first Turkish variome and found "extensive admixture between Balkan, Caucasus, Middle Eastern, and European populations" in line with history of Turkey. Moreover, significant number of rare genome and exome variants were unique to modern-day Turkish population. Neighbouring populations in East and West, and Tuscan people in Italy were closest to Turkish population in terms of genetic similarity. Central Asian contribution to maternal, paternal, and autosomal genes were detected, consistent with the historical migration and expansion of Oghuz Turks from Central Asia. Central Asian autosomal DNA geneflow was estimated as around 10%. Using haplogroups that are only found in Central Asia, the study estimated Central Asian paternal and maternal contributions. Paternal contribution was estimated as between 8.5% to 15.6% based on C-RPS4Y and O3-M122 Y-chromosome haplogroups. Maternal contributions was estimated as around 8% based on D4c and G2a mtDNA haplogroups. The authors speculated that the genetic similarity of the modern-day Turkish population with modern-day European populations might be due to spread of Neolithic Anatolian farmers into Europe, which impacted the genetic makeup of modern-day European populations. Moreover, the study found no clear genetic separation between different regions of Turkey, leading authors to suggest that recent migration events within Turkey resulted in genetic homogenization.

== Other studies ==
A 2001 study that looked at HLA alleles suggested that "Turks, Kurds, Armenians, Iranians, Jews, Lebanese and other (Eastern and Western) Mediterranean groups seem to share a common ancestry" and that historical populations such as Anatolian Hittite and Hurrian groups (older than 2000 B.C.) "may have given rise to present‐day Kurdish, Armenian and Turkish populations." A 2004 study that looked at 11 human‐specific Alu insertion polymorphisms among Aromanians, Macedonians, Albanians, Romanians, Greeks, and Turks, suggested a common ancestry for these populations.

A 2001 study found that Jews were more closely related to groups of the Fertile Crescent (Kurds, Turks, and Armenians) than to their Arab neighbors, whose genetic signature was found in geographic patterns reflective of Islamic conquests.

A 2011 study ruled out long-term and continuing genetic contacts between Anatolia and Siberia and confirmed the presence of significant mitochondrial DNA and Y-chromosome divergence between these regions, with minimal admixture. The research also confirmed the lack of mass migration and suggested that it was irregular punctuated migration events that engendered large-scale shifts in language and culture among Anatolia's diverse autochthonous inhabitants.

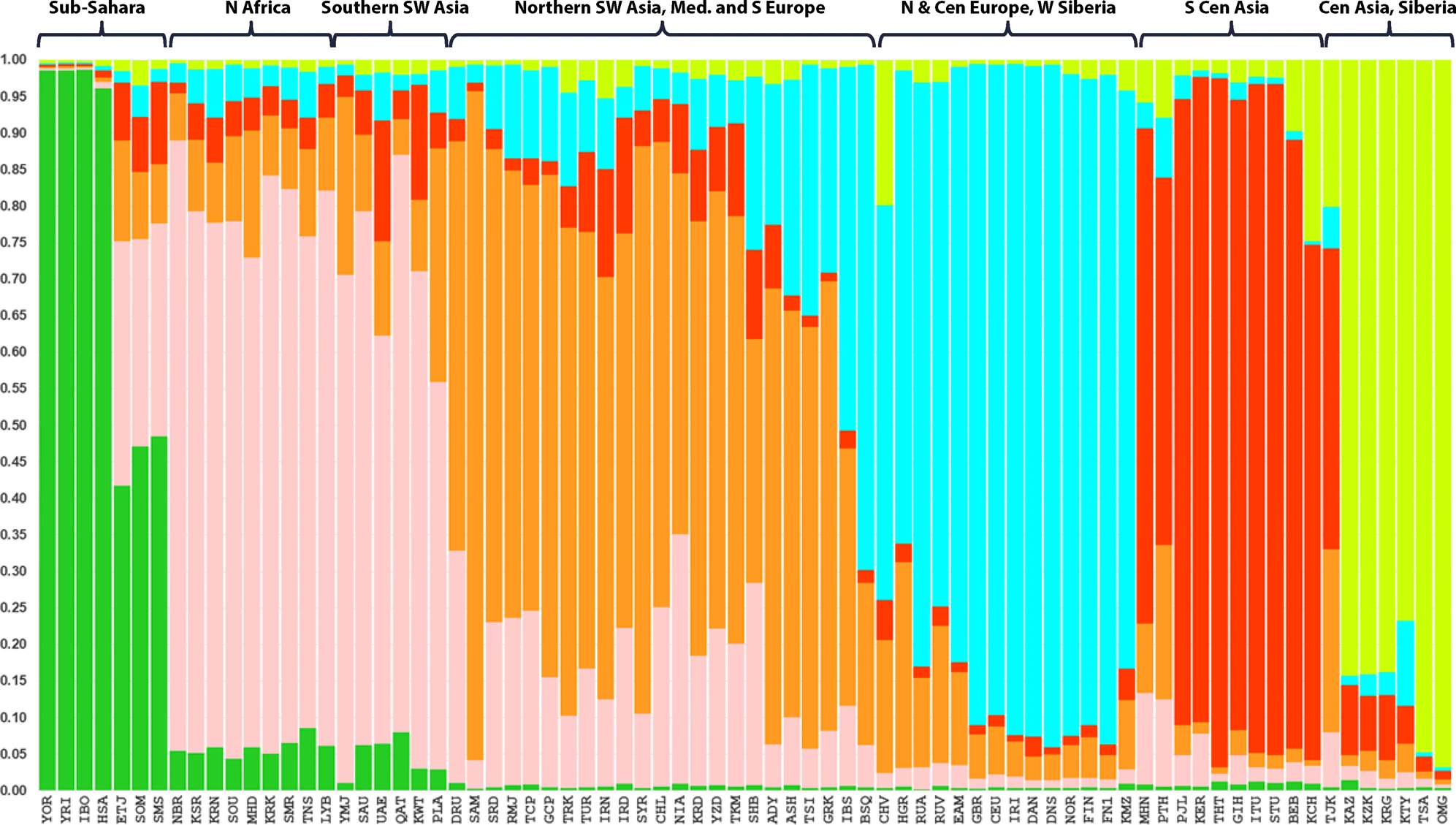
Estimated cluster membership bar plot for populations in West Asia, Europe, Africa, South Central Asia, Central Asia, and Siberia. The populations with the largest orange bars, including Turkish people, are located primarily in Southern and Mediterranean Europe, and the northern part of Southwest Asia.

A study in 2015, however, wrote, "Previous genetic studies have generally used Turks as representatives of ancient Anatolians. Our results show that Turks are genetically shifted towards Central Asians, a pattern consistent with a history of mixture with populations from this region." The authors found "7.9% (±0.4) East Asian ancestry in Turks from admixture occurring 800 (±170) years ago."

According to a 2012 study of ethnic Turks, "Turkish population has a close genetic similarity to Middle Eastern and European populations and some degree of similarity to South Asian and Central Asian populations." The analysis modeled each person's DNA as having originated from K ancestral populations and varied the parameter K from 2 to 7. At K = 3, comparing to individuals from the Middle East (Druze and Palestinian), Europe (French, Italian, Tuscan and Sardinian) and Central Asia (Uygur, Hazara and Kyrgyz), clustering results indicated that the contributions were 45%, 40% and 15% for the Middle Eastern, European and Central Asian populations, respectively. At K = 4, results for paternal ancestry were 38% European, 35% Middle Eastern, 18% South Asian, and 9% Central Asian. At K = 7, results of paternal ancestry were 77% European, 12% South Asian, 4% Middle Eastern, and 6% Central Asian. However, results may reflect either previous population movements (such as migration and admixture) or genetic drift. The Turkish samples were closest to the Adygei population (Circassians) from the Caucasus; other sampled groups included European (French, Italian), Middle Eastern (Druze, Palestinian), and Central (Kyrgyz, Hazara, Uygur), South Asian (Indian), and East Asian (Mongolian, Han) populations.

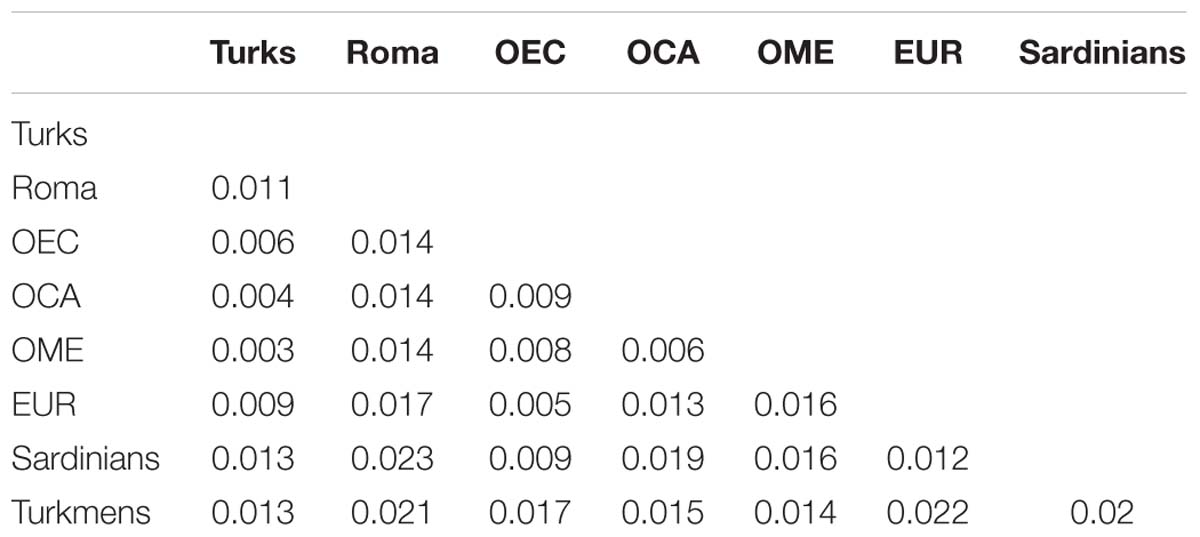
Population relationships based on fixation index distance estimates. Turks are closest to OCA (Caucasus) and OME (Iranian and Syrian) groups, compared to other groups or populations such as East-Central European populations (OEC), European (EUR, including Northern and Eastern European), Sardinian, Roma, and Turkmen.

A study involving mitochondrial analysis of a Byzantine-era population, whose samples were gathered from excavations in the archaeological site of Sagalassos, found that these samples were closest to modern samples from "Turkey, Crimea, Iran and Italy (Campania and Puglia), Cyprus and the Balkans (Bulgaria, Croatia, and Greece)." Modern-day samples from the nearby town of Ağlasun showed that lineages of East Eurasian descent assigned to macro-haplogroup M were found in the modern samples from Ağlasun. This haplogroup was significantly more frequent in Ağlasun (15%) than in Byzantine Sagalassos, but the study found "no genetic discontinuity across two millennia in the region."

A 2019 study found that Turkish people cluster with Southern and Mediterranean Europe populations along with groups in the northern part of Southwest Asia (such as the populations from Caucasus, Northern Iraq, and Iranians). Another 2019 study found that Turkish people have the lowest fixation index distances with Caucasus population group and Iranian-Syrian group, as compared to East-Central European, European (including Northern and Eastern European), Sardinian, Roma, and Turkmen groups or populations. The Caucasus group in the study included samples from Abkhazians, Adygey, Armenians, Balkars, Chechens, Georgians, Kumyks, Kurds, Lezgins, Nogays, and North Ossetians. A 2022 study, which looked at modern-day populations and more than 700 ancient genomes from Southern Europe and West Asia covering a period of 11,000 years, found that Turkish people carry the genetic legacy of "both ancient people who lived in Anatolia for thousands of years covered by our study and people coming from Central Asia bearing Turkic languages" and that "The genetic contribution of Central Asian Turkic speakers to present-day people can be provisionally estimated by comparison of Central Asian ancestry in present-day Turkish people (~9%) and sampled ancient Central Asians (range of ~41-100%) to be between 9/100 and 9/41 or ~9-22%".

== Historical sensitivity ==
Genetic research into ethnic diversity in Turkey has been politically constrained and contested in the context of Turkish nationalism and state concerns over ethnic separatism. The state-sponsored Turkish History Thesis held that Turks shared ancestry with Anatolia’s indigenous Hittites and denied the existence of Kurds as a separate ethnic group. Although government support for anthropology fell sharply after Atatürk's death in 1938, these Kemalist ideas about Turkish racial identity have continued to influence Turkish society.

Kemalist-era anthropology participated in an ethnonational homogenization project that supported the "erasure" of Kurds and Armenians as competing national groups. Today, the Turkish government has stated that it "does not collect, maintain or use either qualitative or quantitative data on ethnicity", explaining that it emphasizes commonalities rather than "measuring differences and making policies thereon". Researchers have consequently avoided ethnic classifications, restricted the identification of populations, and modified research practices in response to political sensitivities; in one genetic-anthropology project called "The Anatolian Genetic History Project", researchers withheld the names of entire villages out of concern for participants' security because of sensitivities surrounding Alevi and Kurdish identity. The sociologist Burton notes that a 1977 Turkish medical-genetics study was unusual in explicitly identifying Armenians, observing that "Turkish scientists rarely acknowledged the existence of Armenians in their country."

== See also ==
- Demographics of Turkey
- History of the Turkish people
- Genetic history of East Asians
- Genetic history of the Middle East
- Genetic history of Europe
- Turkification
