= Hermann Feodor Kvergić =

Austro-Hungarian Orientalist and linguist (1895–c. 1949)

Hermann Feodor Kvergić (24 June or 24 July 1895, in Bratislava – 1948 or 1949), was an Orientalist, linguist and most notable for his alleged influence on the Turkish nationalist Sun Language Theory.

== Early life and education ==
In a document from the University of Vienna, he is described as having the citizenship of the State of Slovenes, Croats and Serbs and the Greek-Orthodox religion. He eventually moved from Bratislava to Graz, where he graduated from high school on 7 July 1914. He then studied Oriental studies and Medicine at the University of Vienna and another semester of Medicine at the University of Graz. He graduated with a degree in Oriental studies in 1927 with a dissertation on The great Iranic Bundahisn. From 1929 onwards he then travelled through Afghanistan and Iran visiting Turkey in 1933.

== Sun Language Theory ==
In 1935 he sent a pamphlet on the Turkish language to Ahmet Cevat Emre and later also to Mustafa Kemal Atatürk. In the pamphlet, in which the influence of the sun was not treated, he described how he thought that the Turkish pronouns might be the origin of the human language. He mentioned that his work on the Turkish language was influenced by the psychological works of Sigmund Freud. Atatürk was impressed by the findings of Kvergiç and after some discussions within the Turkish Language Association, the Sun Language Theory, which claimed that the Turkish language was the origin of the human language was brought forward. To representatives of the Turkish Language Association, Kvergiç wrote he would be interested in conducting more research on the Sun Language Theory. In 1935 he was employed as a lector of the German language in the Philosophical faculty at the University of Ankara. Later he stayed in Vienna, doing research on the Sun Language Theory while being closely observed and supported by the Turkish embassy. By 1938 he reportedly had an apartment in London. Even though he had quite a notable influence on the findings of the Sun Language Theory, he would not claim authorship over it, but presented it as a new autochthone Turkish theory. In 1947 he was said to have lived in London.

== Personal life ==
His wife was Gertrude Kvergiç-Kraus who had been in contact with Sigmund Freud. His last letter dates from late December 1948.
