= Turkish History Thesis =

Pseudoscientific study

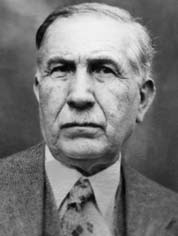
Yusuf Ziya Özer, a law professor and one of the conceivers of the Turkish History Thesis.

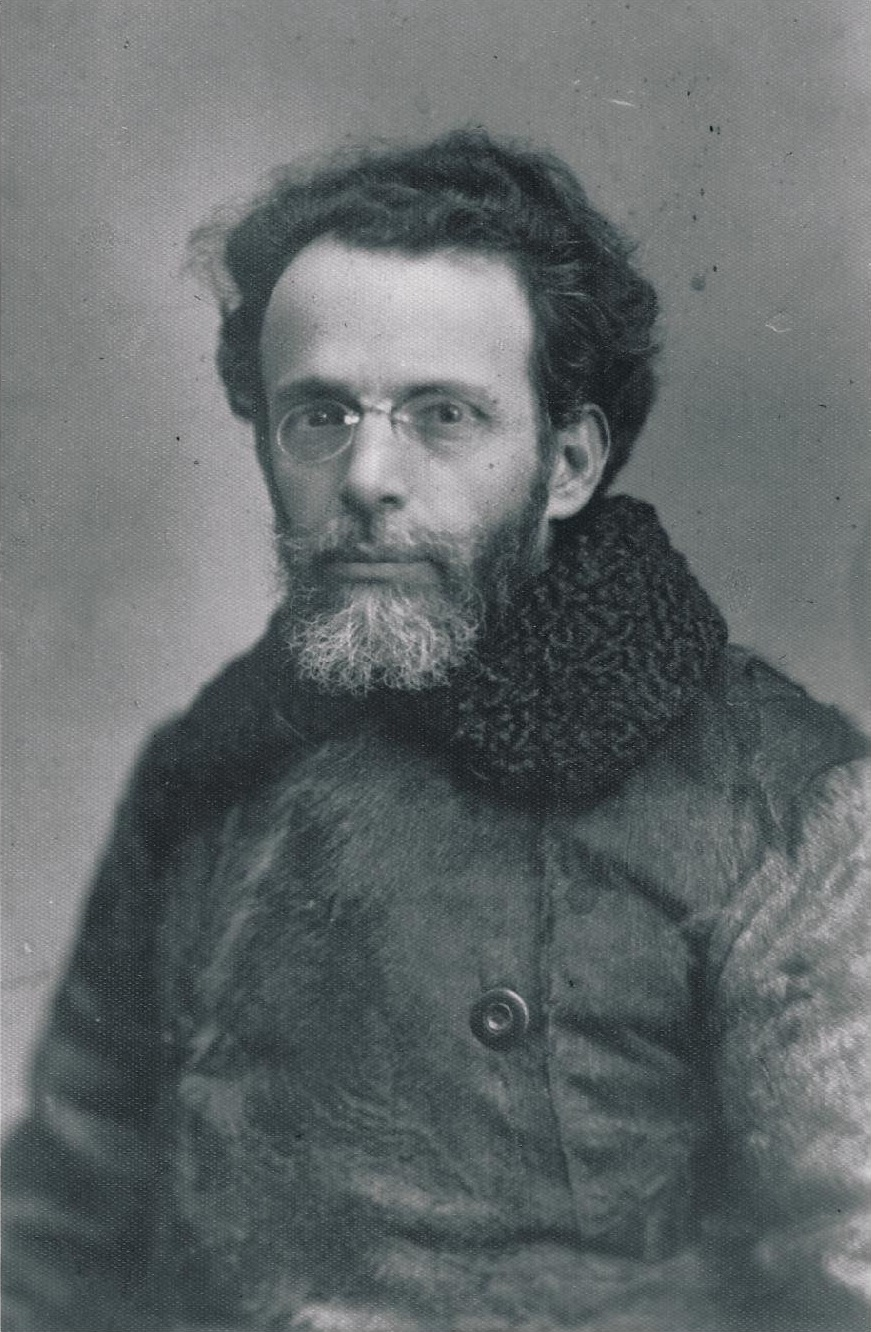
Ahmet Cevat Emre, a writer who was influenced by social Darwinism, which he wrote about in the monthly family magazine Muhit during the early republican period.

The Turkish History Thesis (Türk Tarih Tezi) is a Turkish nationalist, thesis developed in 1930s Turkey to establish a national historical identity and challenge contemporary Eurocentric interpretations of history. The thesis proposed that the Turks moved from their ancestral homeland in Central Asia and migrated to present-day China, the Indian subcontinent, the Balkans, the Middle East, and Northern Africa in several waves, populating the areas which they had moved to and bringing civilization to their native inhabitants. The theory was developed within the context of pre-Nazi scientific racism, classifying the Turks as an "Alpine subgroup" of the Caucasian race. The intent of the theory was a rejection of the Western European assertions that the Turks belonged to the "yellow or mongol" race. Mustafa Kemal Atatürk took a personal interest in the subject after he was shown a French language book that claimed Turks "belonged to the yellow race" and were a "secondaire" people.

== History ==
In the aftermath of World War I, Turkish intellectuals and policymakers sought to challenge prevailing Eurocentric historical narratives and emphasize the historical contributions of the Turks to world civilization. This effort also reflected the racial and historical debates of the period. The Turkish History Thesis created a third alternative to existing narratives claiming that Greece or Mesopotamia, or both, were the "cradles" of Western civilization. It associated ancient Anatolian civilizations, particularly the Hittite, with the Turks and advanced claims of a common Central Asian racial origin, reflecting the racial theories prevalent at the time. The thesis maintained that Turkic peoples had developed an advanced civilization in their Central Asian homeland during prehistoric times and subsequently contributed to the development of civilizations across Eurasia. According to the thesis, Turks migrated from Central Asia to China and subsequently to India, where they were claimed to have founded the civilizations of Mohenjo-daro and Harappa, before spreading to other parts of the world.

The Thesis was made known to the public during the First Turkish Historical Congress, which was held between 2 and 11 July 1932. The congress was attended by eighteen professors of the University of Istanbul (then known as Dârülfünûn), of which some would be dismissed after the congress. 196 Turkish high school teachers were also mentioned in the protocol of the congress. The opening speech belonged to Mahmut Esat Bozkurt, during which he criticized the western scholars for their interpretation of the Turkish history. He claimed that the Central Asian Turks had departed the Stone Age 7000 years before the Europeans, and then dispersed westwards as the first people to have brought civilization to the humans. Afet İnan, an adoptive daughter of Mustafa Kemal Atatürk and member of the Turkish history committee of the Turkish Hearths, pushed the view that the Turks were what was racially called "brachycephalic" and they established a developed civilization around an "inner sea" which is located in Central Asia. According to her, they left after the "inner sea" dried up due to climate change and from there, they spread out and disseminated civilization to other cultures, including the cultures which existed in China, India, Egypt and Greece. The internal contradictions of the Turkish History Thesis became more pronounced in later decades as Colonel Kurtcebe sought to raise the modern Turkish people's awareness of its connection to Central Asia and the Mongols. He believed that an emphasis on Western-style historical education had caused the Turks to be uninterested in Mongolian history.

The thesis was influenced by the book Türk Tarihinin Ana Hatları (The Mainlines of Turkish History) published by the Committee for the Study of the Turkish History (TOTTTH) of the Turkish Hearths and became a "state dogma" which was included in school textbooks. During Atatürk's government, scholars like Hasan Reşit Tankut and Rıfat Osman Bey were encouraged to have the findings of their studies in history and social sciences be in line with the Turkish Historical Thesis and the Sun Language Theory. The Turkish Historical Thesis is connected with the Sun Language Theory published in 1935 which stipulates that all languages have their origin from the Turkish language. Prominent scholars like Zeki Velidi Togan and Nihal Atsız who challenged the Turkish Historical Thesis lost their jobs at the University.

== Turkish History Thesis and Hittites ==
The Turkish History Thesis sought to portray Turks as an autochthonous population of Anatolia by identifying ancient Anatolian peoples, particularly the Hittites, as Turks. Burton writes that this allowed them to acknowledge the Turks' linguistic-cultural connection to Central Asia while maintaining claims that they were the original inhabitants of Anatolia. Scholars have characterized the historical and racial claims used to develop the Turkish History Thesis as pseudoscientific, distorted, or fabricated.

Kemalist researchers, such as Ahmet Ağaoğlu (who was an advisor to Atatürk and a politician who played an important role in creating the Turkish Constitution of 1924), believed that the nation must portray Hittites as a world-domineering Turkish race with firm roots in Anatolia. In Afet İnan's interpretation of anthropometric data, variation in regions inhabited by Kurds, Armenians, and other non-Turks was attributed to invading "foreign races".

Modern genetic researches on Turkish people show that Anatolian Turks are a mixture of Turkic tribes and Anatolian natives; however, unlike the Turkish History Thesis, these two admixtures do not originate from the same ethnicity, race, or identity.
