= Mehmet Emin Yurdakul =

Turkish politician

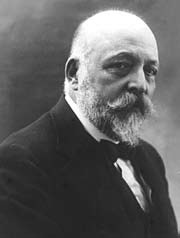
- Born: May 13, 1869; Constantinople, Ottoman Empire (modern Istanbul, Turkey)
- Died: January 14, 1944 (aged 74); Istanbul, Turkey
- Occupations: Politician, author

Mehmet Emin Yurdakul (13 May 1869 – 14 January 1944) was a Turkish nationalist writer, poet and politician. Being an ideologue of Pan-Turkism, his writings and poems had a major impact on defining the term vatan (Fatherland).

== Early life and education ==
Painting of Mehmet Emin Yurdakul by Hoca Ali Rıza

He was born in Constantinople, Ottoman Empire during the late Tanzimat period on 13 May 1869. His father was Salih Reis, a fisherman, and his mother was Emine Hatun. He received his early education in Istanbul, but didn't formally graduate due to the dire financial situation within the family. He then began an internship in the Ottoman administration. He published the book Fazilet ve Asalet in 1891, which caused the prime minister to appoint him to work in his office as the director of documentation.

His early literary work was influenced by the political activist and Islamic ideologist, Jamāl al-Dīn al-Afghānī, who Yurdakul was to get to know in Constantinople in 1892. al-Afghānī died in 1897 and Yurdakul published a compilation of his poetry in the book Türkçe Şiirler, which were accompanied by paintings from Fausto Zonaro.

== Political career ==
He joined the Committee of Union and Progress in 1907 which instigated a coup against Sultan Abdul Hamid II in 1908. Following this, he was employed in the Ottoman administration and sent to Trabzon. From 1909 onwards he was appointed Governor of several provinces of the Ottoman Empire. From 1911 onwards, he was involved in the Pan-Turkist associations such as the Association of Turks (Türk Derneği) and the Turkish Hearths. During World War I, his literary work became popular amongst the adherents of the CUP as his nationalist views did not exclude religion. In 1913 he became a member of the Ottoman Parliament representing Mosul. After the foundation of Turkey in 1923, he was a member of the Grand National Assembly, where he supported the adoption of the Turkish alphabet.

He died on 14 January 1944 and is buried at the Zincirlikuyu Cemetery in Istanbul, Turkey.

== Notable works ==
Türk Sazı; 1979

- Fazilet ve Adalet (Virtue and Justice, 1891)
- Türkçe Şiirler (Poems in Turkish, 1898)
- Türk Sazı (Turkish Instrument, 1914)
- Ey Türk Uyan (O Turk Wake Up, 1914)
- Tan Sesleri (Voices of the Dawn, 1915)
- Ordunun Destanı (The Legend of the Army, 1915)
- Dicle Önünde (In Front of Tigris, 1916)
- İsyan ve Dua (The Uprising and the Prayers, 1918)
- Zafer Yolunda (On the Way of Victory, 1918)
- Turan'a Doğru (Towards Turan, 1918)
- Aydın Kızları (Girls of Aydın, 1919)
- Türk'ün Hukuku (The Law of Turk, 1919)
- Dante'ye (To Dante, 1928)
- Kıral Corc'a (To King George, 1928)
- Mustafa Kemal (Mustafa Kemal, 1928)
- Ankara (Ankara, 1939)
