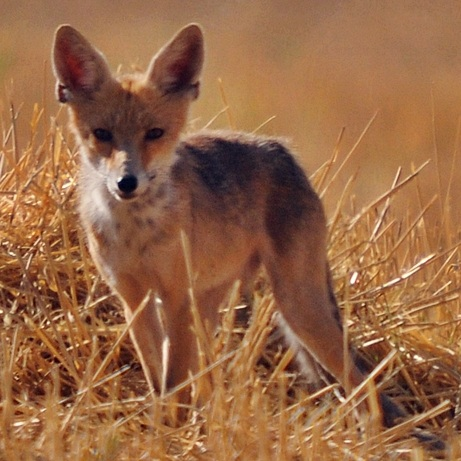
- Trans-Caucasian fox in Bismil, Diyarbakır Province, Turkey, 2011

Conservation status
- Least Concern (IUCN 3.1)

Scientific classification
- Kingdom: Animalia
- Phylum: Chordata
- Class: Mammalia
- Order: Carnivora
- Family: Canidae
- Genus: Vulpes
- Species: V. vulpes
- Subspecies: V. v. kurdistanica

Trinomial name
- Vulpes vulpes kurdistanica (Satunin, 1906)

= Kurdistan red fox =

Trans-Caucasian fox Kurdistan red fox

Subspecies of the red fox

The Kurdistan red fox or Trans-Caucasian fox (Vulpes vulpes kurdistanica) (Note: Kurmanji Kurdish: Roviyê sor ê Kurdistanê; Sorani Kurdish: ڕێویی سووری کوردستانی) is a subspecies of the red fox. It is primarily found in Kurdistan and the Armenian highlands.

This subspecies is a specialized adaptation to the environmental conditions of the geographical Kurdistan region, which spans Iraq, Iran, Turkey, and Syria. Its distinctive features include a red or greyish-red fur coat, a bushy tail, and an omnivorous diet. Notably, the specific characteristics and behaviors of the fox can exhibit slight variations depending on its specific habitat within Kurdistan.

== Name ==
This red fox subspecies is known as Vulpes vulpes kurdistanica and sometimes called the Kurdistan red fox. However, in Turkey, it is known only as Vulpes vulpes due to efforts by the Turkish government to rename animal species that mention Kurdistan or Armenia, claiming that such names were given to these animals as part of a plot of "ill intentions" against Turkish unity. Turkey's political atmosphere is sensitive with regard to Kurds and Armenians because of the Kurdish–Turkish conflict (and denial of Kurdish people by Turkey) and the Ottoman-era Armenian genocide, respectively.

== Range ==
Despite its name, the species is not confined to Kurdish-inhabited areas, appearing near Ankara and Elazığ in Turkey and also near Sulaymaniyah in Iraq.

== Description ==
It is a small animal with rusty-red fur and white underparts, chin, and throat. The ears are prominent and the tail is long and bushy with a white tip. The backs of the ears, lower legs, and the feet are black. The fox goes through colour phases of black, silver, and mixed. This fox subspecies ranges 58–90 cm (23–35 in) in length without its tail. Tail ranges 32–49 cm (13–19 in). Weight approximately 3–11 kg (6.6–24.3 lb). It has a life expectancy of around seven years in the wild and around fifteen years in human captivity.

== See also ==
- Animal name changes in Turkey
