= Turkification =

Adoption of a Turkic culture by a non-Turkic population

Turkification, Turkization, or Turkicization (Turkish: Türkleştirme) describes a shift whereby populations or places receive or adopt Turkic attributes such as culture, language, history, or ethnicity. However, often this term is more narrowly applied to mean specifically Turkish rather than merely Turkic, meaning that it refers more frequently to the Ottoman Empire's policies or the Turkish nationalist policies of the Republic of Turkey toward ethnic minorities in Turkey. As the Turkic states developed and grew, there were many instances of this cultural shift.

The earliest instance of Turkification took place in Central Asia, when, by the 6th century AD, migration of Turkic tribes from Inner Asia caused a language shift among the Iranian peoples of the area. By the 8th century AD, the Turkification of Kashgar was completed by Qarluq Turks, who also Islamized the population.

The Turkification of Anatolia occurred in the time of the Seljuk Empire and Sultanate of Rum, when Anatolia had been a diverse and largely Greek-speaking region after previously being Hellenized.

== Etymology ==
Prior to the 20th century, Anatolian, Balkan, Caucasian, and Middle Eastern regions were said to undergo Ottomanization. "Turkification" started being used interchangeably with "Ottomanization" after the rise of Turkish nationalism in the 20th century.

The term has been used in the Greek language since the 1300s or late-Byzantine era as "εκτουρκισμός", or "τούρκεμα". It literally translates to "becoming a Turk". Apart from people, it may also refer to cities conquered by the Turks or churches converted to mosques. It is more frequently used in the verb form "τουρκεύω" (to Turkify, to become Muslim or Turk).

== History ==
=== Early examples of Turkification ===
By 750, the Turkification of Kashgar by the Qarluq Turks was underway. The Qarluqs were ancestors of the Karakhanids, who also Islamized the population. The Iranian language of Khwarezm, a Central Asian oasis region, eventually died out as a result of Turkification.

==== Turkification of Central Asia ====
The current population of Central Asia is the result of the long and complex process that started at least 1,400 years ago. Today this region consists of mainly Turkic ethnic groups, barring Persian-speaking Tajiks, although centuries ago its native inhabitants were Iranian peoples. Turkification of the native Iranian population of Central Asia (Note: Mainly the territories of the present-day Kazakhstan, Turkmenistan and Kyrgyzstan) began by the 6th century A.D. partly due to migration of Turkic tribes from Inner Asia. The process of Turkification of Central Asia, besides those parts that constitute the territory of present-day Tajikistan and parts of Uzbekistan with a majority Tajik population, accelerated with the Mongol conquest of Central Asia. (Note: Though Mongols were not Turks or Turkic-speaking people, their army consisted mostly of Turkic warriors by the end of the conquest of Central Asia) Mahmud al-Kashgari writes that the people who lived between Bukhara and Samarkand were Turkified Sogdians, whom he refers to as “Sogdak”.

Tajiks are considered to be the only ethnic group to have survived the process of Turkification in Central Asia. Despite their clear Iranian ethnicity, some arguments attempt to denounce Tajiks' Iranian identity, and instead link them with the descendants of Arabs raised in Iran or Turks who have lost their language under the influence of Persian civilization.

==== Turkification of Azerbaijan ====
Turkification of the non-Turkic population derives from the Turkic settlements in the area now known as Azerbaijan, which began and accelerated during the Seljuq period. The migration of Oghuz Turks from present-day Turkmenistan, which is attested by linguistic similarity, remained high through the Mongol period, since the bulk of the Ilkhanate troops were Turkic. By the Safavid period, the Turkic nature of Azerbaijan increased with the influence of the Qizilbash, an association of the Turkmen nomadic tribes that was the backbone of the Safavid Empire.

According to Soviet scholars, the Turkification of Azerbaijan was largely completed during the Ilkhanate period. Turkish scholar Faruk Sumer notes three distinct periods in which Turkification took place: Seljuq, Mongol and Post-Mongol (Qara Qoyunlu, Aq Qoyunlu and Safavid). In the first two, Oghuz Turkic tribes advanced or were driven to Anatolia and Arran. In the last period, the Turkic elements in Iran (Oghuz, with lesser admixtures of Uyghur, Qipchaq, Qarluq as well as Turkified Mongols) were joined now by Anatolian Turks migrating back to Iran. This marked the final stage of Turkification.

=== Turkification of Anatolia ===
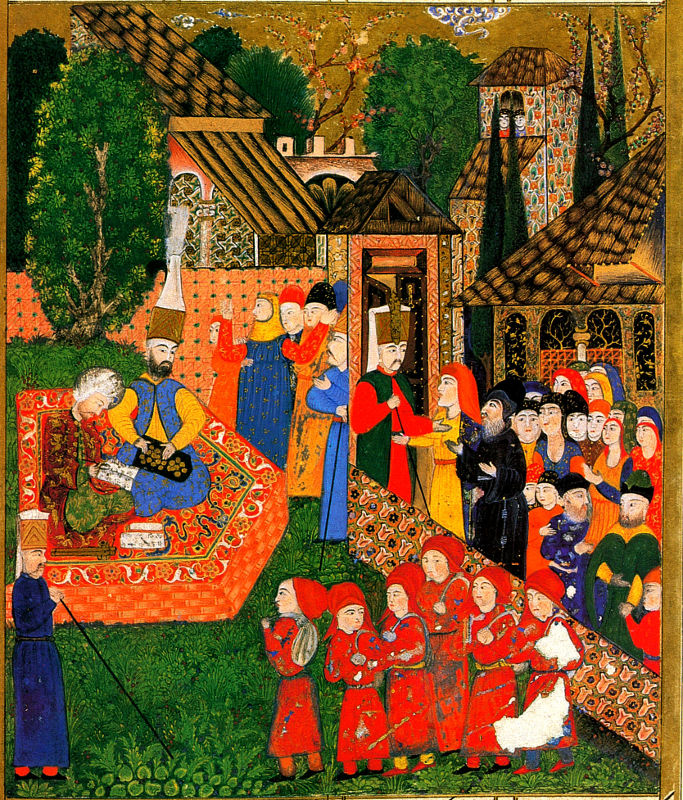
Illustration of the registration of Christian boys for the devşirme. Ottoman miniature painting, 1558.

Anatolia was home to many different peoples in ancient times who were either indigenous peoples or settlers and invaders. These different people included the Armenians, Anatolian peoples, Persians, Hurrians, Greeks, Cimmerians, Galatians, Colchians, Iberians, Arabs, Arameans, Assyrians, Corduenes, and scores of others. During the Mycenaean and Classical periods of Greek history, Greeks colonised the western, northern and southern coasts of Anatolia. Over the course of many centuries a process of Hellenization occurred throughout the interior Anatolia which was aided by the fact that Koine Greek was the lingua franca in political circles and also later became the primary liturgical language, and the similarity of some of the native languages of Anatolia to Greek (cf. Phrygian). By the 5th century the native people of Asia Minor were entirely Greek in their language and Christian in religion. These Greek-speaking Christian inhabitants of Asia Minor are known as Byzantine Greeks, although at the time they would have considered themselves to be Romans (Rhomaioi), and they formed the bulk of the Byzantine Empire's Greek-speaking population for over a thousand years, from the 4th century until the fall of the Byzantine state in the 15th century. In the northeast along the Black Sea these peoples eventually formed their own state known as the Empire of Trebizond, which gave rise to the modern Pontic Greek population. In the east, near the borderlands with the Iranian plateau, other native languages remained, specifically Armenian, Assyrian Aramaic, and Kurdish. Byzantine authorities routinely conducted large-scale population transfers in an effort to impose religious uniformity and quell rebellions. For instance, after the subordination of the First Bulgarian Empire in 1018, select parts of its army were resettled in Eastern Anatolia. The Byzantines were particularly keen to assimilate the large Armenian population. To that end, in the eleventh century, the Armenian nobility were resettled throughout western Anatolia with prominent families subsumed into the Byzantine nobility, leading to numerous Byzantine generals and emperors of Armenian origin.

Beginning in the eleventh century, continuous war between the Byzantine and the Seljuk Empire led to the destruction of multiple major settlements and to the deaths of thousands of Byzantines in Asia Minor, while others were enslaved or force to relocate. As areas became depopulated, Turkoman nomads moved in with their herds.

The Turkish conquest and settlement of Anatolia had been a long and disruptive affair that had brought enslavement, flight, plague, and famine to much of the Christian populace, and the Byzantine state had suffered repeated catastrophes. The conquests reduced the church to a state of extreme penury, which in turn barred it from effective social and economic action. The crippling of the ecclesiastical administrative apparatus left the demoralized Christian communities leaderless in a period of great psychological and economic crisis. All these constituted negative factors in the cultural transformation of Anatolia, factors, nevertheless, crucial to the process for they undermined the foundations of Byzantine society.

However, despite the suffering of the local Christian populations at the hands of the Turkoman tribesmen, they were still an overwhelming majority of the population 50 years after the Battle of Manzikert. The Turks seem to have been aware of their numerical inferiority during this time period as evidenced by the fact many Turkish rulers went to lengths to disarm their Christian subjects. There is also evidence that the Turks resorted to kidnapping Christian children and raising them as Turks, as attested by contemporary chronicler Matthew of Edessa. Intermarriage between Turks and Greek, Armenian and Georgian natives of Anatolia was not unheard of, although the majority of these unions were between Turkish men and Christian women. The children of these unions, known as Mixobarbaroi, were raised as Turks and were of the Muslim faith (although there were some cases of Mixobarbaroi defecting to the Byzantines). It is likely that these unions played a role in the eventual diminishment of the Christian population in Anatolia and its transition from Greek/Christian to Turkish/Muslim.

==== Number of pastoralists of Turkic origin in Anatolia ====
The number of nomads of Turkic origin that migrated to Anatolia is a matter of discussion. According to Ibn Sa'id al-Maghribi, there were 200,000 Turkmen tents in Denizli and its surrounding areas, 30,000 in Bolu and its surrounding areas, and 100,000 in Kastamonu and its surrounding areas. According to a Latin source, at the end of the 12th century, there were 100,000 nomadic tents in the regions of Denizli and Isparta.

According to Ottoman tax archives, in modern-day Anatolia, in the provinces of Anatolia, Karaman, Dulkadir and Rûm, there were about 872,610 households in the 1520s and 1530s; 160,564 of those households were nomadic, and the remainder were sedentary. Of the four provinces, Anatolia (which does not include the whole of geographic Anatolia but only its western and some of its northwestern parts) had the largest nomadic population with 77,268 households. Between 1570 and 1580, 220,217 households of the overall 1,360,474 households in the four provinces were nomadic, which means that at least 20% of Anatolia was still nomadic in the 16th century. The province of Anatolia, which had the largest nomadic population with 77,268 households, saw an increase of its nomadic population to 116,219 households in those years.

==== Devshirme ====
Devshirme (devşirme; literally "collecting" in Turkish), also known as the blood tax, was chiefly the annual practice by which the Ottoman Empire sent military to press second or third sons of their Christian subjects (Rum millet) in the villages of the Balkans into military training as Janissaries. They were then taught to speak Turkish and converted to Islam with the primary objective of selecting and training the ablest children of the Empire for military or civil service, mostly into the ranks of the Janissaries. Started by Murad I as a means to counteract the growing power of the Turkish nobility, the practice itself violated Islamic law. By 1648, the practice drew to an end. An attempt to re-institute it in 1703 was resisted by its Ottoman members who coveted its military and civilian posts, and in the early part of Ahmet III's reign, the practice was abolished.

=== Late Ottoman era ===
The late Ottoman government sought to create "a core identity with a single Turkish religion, language, history, tradition, culture and set of customs", replacing earlier Ottoman traditions that had not sought to assimilate different religions or ethnic groups. The Ottoman Empire had an ethnically diverse population that included Turks, Arabs, Albanians, Bosniaks, Greeks, Persians, Bulgarians, Serbs, Armenians, Kurds, Zazas, Circassians, Assyrians, Jews and Laz people. Turkish nationalists claimed that only Turks were loyal to the state. Ideological support for Turkification was not widespread in the Ottoman Empire.

One of its main supporters was sociologist and political activist Ziya Gökalp who believed that a modern state must become homogeneous in terms of culture, religion, and national identity. This conception of national identity was augmented by his belief in the primacy of Turkishness as a unifying virtue. As part of this belief, it was necessary to purge from the territories of the state those national groups who could threaten the integrity of a modern Turkish nation state. The 18th article of the Ottoman Constitution of 1876 declared Turkish the sole official language, and that only Turkish speaking people could be employed in the government.

After the Young Turks assumed power in 1909, the policy of Turkification received several new layers and it was sought to impose Turkish in the administration, the courts, and education in the areas where the Arabic-speaking population was the majority. Another aim was to loosen ties between the Empire's Turk and ethnically non-Turkish populations through efforts to purify the Turkish language of Arabic influences. In this nationalist vision of Turkish identity, language was supreme, and religion was relegated to a subordinate role. Arabs responded by asserting the superiority of Arabic language, describing Turkish as a "mongrel" language that had borrowed heavily from the Persian and Arabic languages. Through the policy of Turkification, the Young Turk government suppressed the Arabic language. Turkish teachers were hired to replace Arabic teachers at schools. The Ottoman postal service was administrated in Turkish.

Those who supported Turkification were accused of harming Islam. Rashid Rida was an advocate who supported Arabic against Turkish. Even before the Young Turk Revolution of 1908, the Syrian Reformer Tahrir al-Jazairi had convinced Midhat Pasha to adopt Arabic as the official language of instruction at state schools. The language of instruction was only changed to Turkish in 1885 under Sultan Abdul Hamid II. Though writers like Ernest Dawn have noted that the foundations of Second Constitutional Era "Arabism" predate 1908, the prevailing view still holds that Arab nationalism emerged as a response to the Ottoman Empire's Turkification policies. One historian of Arab nationalism wrote that: "the Unionists introduced a grave provocation by opposing the Arab language and adopting a policy of Turkification", but not all scholars agree about the contribution of Turkification policies to Arab nationalism.

European critics who accused the CUP of depriving non-Turks of their rights through Turkification saw Turk, Ottoman and Muslim as synonymous, and believed Young Turk "Ottomanism" posed a threat to Ottoman Christians. The British ambassador Gerard Lowther said it was like "pounding non-Turkish elements in a Turkish mortar", while another contemporary European source complained that the CUP plan would reduce "the various races and regions of the empire to one dead level of Turkish uniformity." Rifa'at 'Ali Abou-El-Haj has written that "some Ottoman cultural elements and Islamic elements were abandoned in favor of Turkism, a more potent device based on ethnic identity and dependent on a language based nationalism".

The Young Turk government launched a series of initiatives that included forced assimilation. Uğur Üngör writes that "Muslim Kurds and Sephardi Jews were considered slightly more 'Turkifiable' than others", noting that many of these nationalist era "social engineering" policies perpetuated persecution "with little regard for proclaimed and real loyalties." These policies culminated in the Armenian and Assyrian genocides.

During World War I, the Ottoman government established orphanages throughout the empire which included Armenian, Kurdish, and Turkish children. Armenian orphans were given Arabic and Turkish names. In 1916 a Turkification campaign began in which whole Kurdish tribes were to be resettled in areas where they were not to exceed more than 10% of the local population. Talaat Pasha ordered that Kurds in the eastern areas be relocated in western areas. He also demanded information regarding if the Kurds Turkified in their new settlements and if they got along with their Turkish population. Additionally, non-Kurdish immigrants from Greece, Albania, Bosnia and Bulgaria were to be settled in the Diyarbakır province, where the deported Kurds had lived before. By October 1918, with the Ottoman army retreating from Lebanon, a Father Sarlout sent the Turkish and Kurdish orphans to Damascus, while keeping the Armenian orphans in Antoura. He began the process of reversing the Turkification process by having the Armenian orphans recall their original names. It is believed by various scholars that at least two million Turks have at least one Armenian grandparent.

Around 1.5 million Ottoman Greeks remained in the Ottoman Empire after losses of 550,000 during WWI. Almost all, 1,250,000, except for those in Constantinople, had fled before or were forced to go to Greece in 1923 in the population exchanges mandated by the League of Nations after the Greco-Turkish War (1919–1922). The lingual Turkification of Greek-speakers in 19th-century Anatolia is well documented. According to Speros Vryonis the Karamanlides are the result of partial Turkification that occurred earlier, during the Ottoman period. Fewer than 300,000 Armenians remained of 1.2 million before the war; fewer than 100,000 of 400,000 Assyrians.

=== Modern Turkey ===
After the Great Thessaloniki Fire of 1917 displaced many of the Salonikan Jews and the Burning of Smyrna, the rebuilding of these places by the post-Ottoman Turkish and Greek nation-states devastated and erased the past of non-Turkish (and non-Hellenistic) habitation. According to historian Talin Suciyan, for non-Muslims in the Republic of Turkey, Turkification resulted in "de-identification, in which a person loses all references to his or her own grandparents, socialisation, culture and history, but cannot fully become part of the society, culture, and politics of the imposed system". There continues to be state-organized discrimination, such as keeping files of citizens of non-Muslim descent.

Ottoman Turkish classical music was banned from the school curriculum. Ottoman archival documents were sold to Bulgaria as recycled paper. Sunday was made the official rest day instead of Friday (the traditional rest day in the Muslim religion).

Political elites in the early Republic were divided: the modernist agenda, which promoted radical transformation, erasing all vestiges of the Ottoman past, and moderate nationalists, who preferred a softer transition that retained some elements of Ottoman heritage.

==== Ethnonational identity ====
When the modern Republic of Turkey was founded in 1923, nationalism and secularism were two of the founding principles. Mustafa Kemal Atatürk, the leader of the early years of the Republic, aimed to create a nation-state (Turkish: Ulus) from the Turkish remnants of the Ottoman Empire. The Turkish Ministry of National Education in 2008 defines the "Turkish People" as "those who protect and promote the moral, spiritual, cultural and humanistic values of the Turkish Nation." One of the goals of the establishment of the new Turkish state was to ensure "the domination of Turkish ethnic identity in every aspect of social life from the language that people speak in the streets to the language to be taught at schools, from the education to the industrial life, from the trade to the cadres of state officials, from the civil law to the settlement of citizens to particular regions." In 2008, the then Defense Minister of Turkey; Vecdi Gönül remarked defending the actions of Mustafa Kemal Atatürk regarding the Turkification of Anatolia: "Could Turkey be the same national country had the Greek community still lived in the Aegean or Armenians lived in many parts of Turkey?"

The process of unification through Turkification continued within modern Turkey with such policies as:

- According to Art. 12 of the Turkish Constitution of 1924, citizens who could not speak and read Turkish were not allowed to become members of parliament.
- A law from December 1925 demanded that clothes worn by employees in all companies must be of Turkish production.
- A Report for Reform in the East was released in September 1925 according to which non-Turkish languages shall be forbidden.
- On 18 March 1926 a Civil Servants Law came into effect, which allowed only Turks to become civil servants and explicitly excluded Armenians and Greeks to become such.
- On 28 May 1927 it was decided that business correspondence must be in Turkish language, and foreign assurance companies must employ Turks, except for the director and the deputy director.
- The Law 1164 from September 1927 enabled the creation of regional administrative areas called Inspectorates-General (Turkish: Umumi Müfettişlikler), where extensive policies of Turkification were applied. The Inspectorates Generals existed until 1952.
- Citizen, speak Turkish! (Turkish: Vatandaş Türkçe konuş!) – An initiative created by law students but sponsored by the Turkish government which aimed to put pressure on non-Turkish speakers to speak Turkish in public in the 1930s. In some municipalities, fines were given to those speaking in any language other than Turkish.
- The Law 2007 of 11 June 1932 reserved a wide number of professions like lawyer, construction worker, artisan, hairdresser, messenger, etc. to Turkish citizens and forbade foreigners also to open shops in rural areas. Most affected by the Law were the Greeks.
- 1934 Resettlement Law (also known as Law no. 2510) – A policy adopted by the Turkish government which set forth the basic principles of immigration. The law was issued to impose a policy of forceful assimilation of non-Turkish minorities through a forced and collective resettlement.
- Surname Law – The surname law forbade certain surnames that contained connotations of foreign cultures, nations, tribes, and religions. As a result, many ethnic Armenians, Greeks, and Kurds were forced to adopt last names of Turkish rendition. Names ending with "yan, of, ef, viç, is, dis, poulos, aki, zade, shvili, madumu, veled, bin" (names that denote Armenian, Slavic, Greek, Albanian, Arabic, Georgian, Kurdish, and other origins) could not be registered, and they had to be replaced by "-oğlu."
- From 1932 on, it was implemented by the Diyanet that the Adhan and the Salah shall be called in Turkish. Imams who delivered the Adhan in Arabic were prosecuted according to the article 526 of the Turkish Criminal Code for "being opposed to the command of officials maintaining public order and safety". 1941 a new paragraph was added to Article 526 of the Turkish Criminal Code and from then on Imams who refused to deliver the Adhan in Turkish could be imprisoned for up to 3 months or be fined with between 10 and 300 Turkish Lira. After the Democrat Party won the elections in 1950, on 17 June 1950 it was decided that the prayers could be given in Arabic again.
- The conscription of the 20 Classes working battalions in the years 1941–1942. Only non-Muslims, mainly Jews, Greeks and Armenians were conscripted to work under difficult conditions.
- Varlık Vergisi ("Wealth tax" or "Capital tax") – A Turkish tax levied on the wealthy citizens of Turkey in 1942, with the stated aim of raising funds for the country's defense in case of an eventual entry into World War II. Those who suffered most severely were non-Muslims like the Jews, Greeks, Armenians, and Levantines, who controlled a large portion of the economy; the Armenians were most heavily taxed. According to Klaus Kreiser for President Inönü the aim of the tax was to evict the foreigners who control the Turkish economy and move the economy to the Turks
- Article 16 of the Population Law from 1972 prohibited to give newborns names that were contrary to the national culture.
- Animal name changes in Turkey – An initiative by the Turkish government to remove any reference to Armenia and Kurdistan in the Latin names of animals.
- Confiscated Armenian properties in Turkey – An initiative by the Ottoman and Turkish governments which involved seizure of the assets, properties and land of the Armenian community of Turkey. The policy is considered a nationalization and Turkification of the country's economy by eliminating ownership of non-Turkish minorities which in this case would be of the Armenian community.
- Geographical name changes in Turkey – An initiative by the Turkish government to replace non-Turkish geographical and topographic names within the Turkish Republic or the Ottoman Empire, with Turkish names, as part of a policy of Turkification. The main proponent of the initiative has been a Turkish homogenization social-engineering campaign which aimed to assimilate or obliterate geographical or topographical names that were deemed foreign and divisive against Turkish unity. The names that were considered foreign were usually of Armenian, Greek, Laz, Slavic, Kurdish, Assyrian, or Arabic origin. For example, words such as Armenia were banned in 1880 from use in the press, schoolbooks, and governmental establishments and was subsequently replaced with words like Anatolia or Kurdistan. Assyrians have increased their protest regarding the forced Turkification of historically Aramaic-named cities and localities and they see this process as continuing the cultural genocide of their identity and history (as part of the wider erasure of Assyrian, Kurdish and Armenian cultures).
- Article 301 (Turkish Penal Code) – An article of the Turkish Penal Code which makes it illegal to insult Turkey, the Turkish nation, or Turkish government institutions. It took effect on 1 June 2005, and was introduced as part of a package of penal-law reform in the process preceding the opening of negotiations for Turkish membership of the European Union (EU), in order to bring Turkey up to the Union standards.
- Turkification was also prevalent in the educational system of Turkey. Measures were adopted making Turkish classes mandatory in minority schools and making use of the Turkish language mandatory in economic institutions.

== Imprecise meaning of Türk ==
The Ottoman elite identified themselves as Ottomans, not as Turks, because the term was associated mainly with Turkmens. Ottomans, like Central Asian Turkic peoples, firstly identified themselves via tribal descent and secondly viewed the various peoples under their dynastic rule (devlet) as part of a unique civilization, while viewing other Turkic peoples as more alien; seeing as they claimed Kayı ancestry through the House of Osman, the modern notion of "Turk" as a uniquely inter-ethnic label would not be communicable.

In the late 19th century, while "Turk" was still a pejorative for poor Yörük-Turkoman farmers and pastoralists of ignoble origins, European ideas of nationalism were adopted by the Ottoman elite, and when it became clear that the local Turkish-speakers of Anatolia were the most loyal supporters of Ottoman rule, the term Türk took on a much more positive connotation.

The imprecision of the appellation Türk can also be seen with other ethnic names, such as Kürt ("Kurd"), which is often applied by western Anatolians to anyone east of Adana, even those who speak only Turkish.

Thus, the category Türk, like other ethnic categories popularly used in Turkey, does not have a uniform usage. In recent years, centrist Turkish politicians have attempted to redefine this category in a more multicultural way, emphasizing that a Türk is anyone who is a citizen of the Republic of Turkey. After 1982, article 66 of the Turkish Constitution defines a "Turk" as anyone who is "bound to the Turkish state through the bond of citizenship".

== Genetic testing ==
The population of Asia Minor (Anatolia) and Balkans including Greece was estimated at 10.7 million in 600 AD whereas Asia Minor was probably around 8 million during the High Middle Ages (950 to 1348 AD). The estimated population for Asia Minor around 1204 AD was 6 million, including 3 million in Seljuk territory. Turkish genomic variation, along with several other Western Asian populations, looks most similar to genomic variation of South European populations such as southern Italians.

Data from ancient DNA – covering the Paleolithic, the Neolithic, and the Bronze Age periods – showed that Western Asian genomes, including Turkish ones, have been greatly influenced by early agricultural populations in the area; later population movements, such as those of Turkic speakers, also contributed. The first and only (as of 2017) whole genome sequencing study in Turkey was done in 2014. Moreover, the genetic variation of various populations in Central Asia "has been poorly characterized"; Western Asian populations may also be "closely related to populations in the east".

An earlier 2011 review had suggested that "small-scale, irregular punctuated migration events" caused changes in language and culture "among Anatolia's diverse autochthonous inhabitants," which explains Anatolian populations' profile today.

== See also ==
- 1925 Report for Reform in the East
- Arabization
- Cultural assimilation
- Demographics of Turkey
- Genetic history of Europe
- Genetic origins of the Turkish people
- Hellenisation
- History of Anatolia
- Kurdification
- Mongolization
- Pan-Turkism
- Persianization
- Russification
- Sun Language Theory
- Turkification and Islamification of Xinjiang
- Turkish History Thesis
- Turkish settlers in Northern Cyprus
- Uzbekisation
- Turco-Mongol tradition
- Turco-Persian tradition

== Sources ==
- Aydar, Hidayet (2006). "The issue of chanting the Adhan in languages other than Arabic and related social reactions against it in Turkey". Archived from the original on 2019-01-12.
- Bayir, Derya (2013). Minorities and Nationalism in Turkish Law. Surrey, England: Ashgate Publishing. ISBN 978-1-409-42007-1.
- Bayir, Derya (2016). Minorities and Nationalism in Turkish Law. Routledge. ISBN 978-1-317-09579-8.
- Demirdjian, Alexis (2016). The Armenian Genocide Legacy. Springer. ISBN 978-1137561633.
- Jongerden, Joost (2007). The settlement issue in Turkey and the Kurds: an analysis of spatial policies, modernity and war. Leiden, the Netherlands: Brill. ISBN 978-90-04-15557-2.
- Kieser, Hans-Lukas, ed. (2006). Turkey Beyond Nationalism towards Post-Nationalist Identities. International Library of Twentieth Century History. Vol. 8. London: Tauris. ISBN 978-1-84511-141-0.
- Kushner, David (April 1997). "Self-Perception and Identity in Contemporary Turkey". Journal of Contemporary History. 32 (2): 219–33. doi:10.1177/002200949703200206. JSTOR 261242. S2CID 159374632.
- Meeker, Michael E. (1971). "The Black Sea Turks: Some Aspects of Their Ethnic and Cultural Background". International Journal of Middle East Studies. 2 (4): 318–45. doi:10.1017/S002074380000129X. JSTOR 162721. S2CID 162611158.
- Vryonis, Speros (1971). The decline of medieval Hellenism in Asia Minor and the process of Islamization from the eleventh through the fifteenth century. University of California Press.
