= Ahmet Cevat Emre =

Turkish journalist (1876–1961)

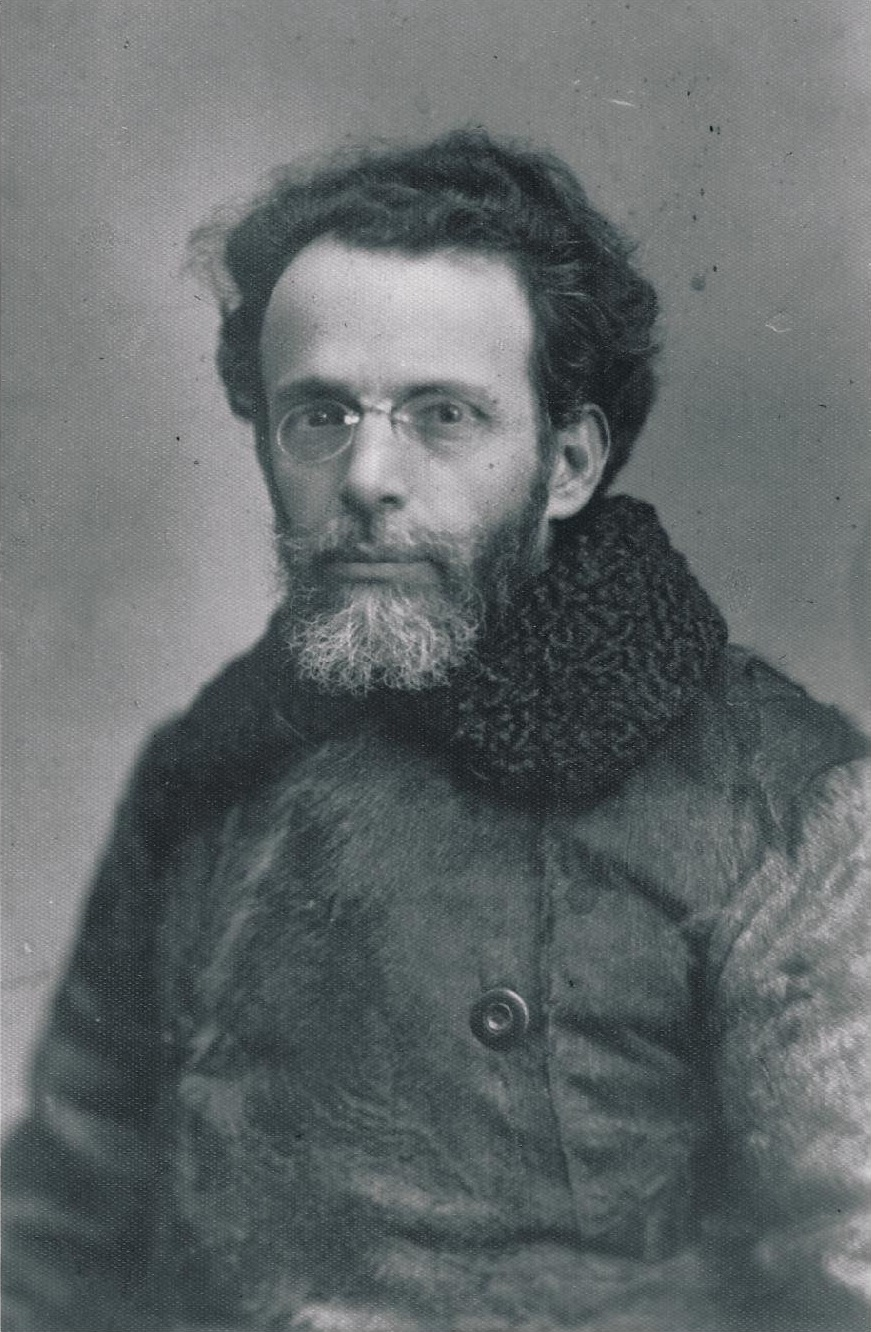
Ahmet Cevat Emre

Ahmet Cevat Emre (1876–1961) was a Turkish journalist and linguist. He was a member of the Turkish Language Association (TDK) and involved in the latinization of the Turkish alphabet. He also served as a deputy for Çanakkale in the Grand National Assembly of Turkey.

== Early life and education ==
Emre was born on Crete, which at the time was within the Ottoman Empire. He later moved to Istanbul where he attended the Kuleli Military High School and later also the Ottoman Military College. He was expected to have successful career in the Ottoman Military, but was imprisoned and exiled to Tripoli, Libya in 1895. In Tripolitania he became familiar with philosopher Herbert Spencers' "First Principles". He later was able to escape to Europe, and was able to return to Istanbul after the Young Turk Revolution in 1908 and joined the Committee of Union and Progress (CUP).

== Professional career ==
He wrote a booklet on the Ottoman language for Middle schools in 1910 and at the beginning of World War I. was assigned as the assistant to the Turcologist and founder of the chair on Ural-Altaic languages at the Darülfünun Friedrich Giese. With the consent of Ziya Gökalp, Emre became the successor of Giese when the German presence in the Ottoman Empire came to an end as a consequence of the Armistice of Mudros. He was left without employment as his chair at the Darülfünun was abolished in the aftermath of World War I, following which he left Istanbul for Tbilisi. In Georgia, he wrote articles in left wing journals and made himself known for his support for the latinization of the Turkish alphabet. Besides he attempted to sell Turkish books to the Azeri Ministry of Education and sell carpets to Turkey. As he moved to Batumi, he published the magazine Yañı Dünya, originally founded by Mustafa Subhi and encouraged Nâzim Hikmet and Vâlâ Nureddin to write for the magazine. Later he was appointed professor for Turkish language at the Oriental Institute of the Moscow University. In late 1924 he had to leave Moscow as his political views raised concerns and he returned to Turkey where he began to write together with his colleague from Moscow Şevket Süreyya Aydemir for the newspaper Aydınlık. He has come to the attention to Mustafa Kemal Atatürk and by 1928 he was in Turkey having been appointed a member of the Turkish language commission which was tasked with the latinization of the Turkish alphabet. In late 1928 he was promoted to one of the members in the Central Bureau of the Language commission which supervised the latter activities. Between 1932 and 1949 he was the head of the Grammar and Syntax Department in the TDK. In January 1935 he was one of the first to have received Hermann F. Kvergič's study on the Turkish language, which has influenced the development of the Sun Language Theory. In the Turkish Language Association he opposed the classification of the languages in isolating, agglutinative and inflectional which he deemed as an old-fashioned European way of thought, but at the same time he attempted to prove that the Turkish language belonged to the inflectional languages, just as the indo-Germanic languages as well.

== Literary works and publishing ==
Besides having written several books on the Turkish language and grammar, he translated Aeschylus' Agamemnon and Homer's Odyssey into Turkish. Between 1928 and 1933 he published and edited the monthly Muhit, a Kemalist outlet focused on social darwinism, the well-being of the family and the raising of a Turkish youth. He is mentioned as one of the very early authors who used the term Kemalism with its political aspects in the magazine Muhit.

== Political career ==
He was also elected as a deputy for Çanakkale in the Grand National Assembly of Turkey.

== Personal life ==
While living in the Soviet Union, he experimented with the concept of a social family sharing a household with Nâzim Hikmet and Vâlâ Nureddin, in which Emre prepared the meals, Hikmet wrote poems and articles, and Nureddin taught Turkish to Azerbaijani. They lived together as a social family in Batumi as well as in Moscow. In Moscow they lived in separate rooms in the Hotel Lux with a common kitchen for the household.
