= Rıfat Osman Bey =

Turkish politician

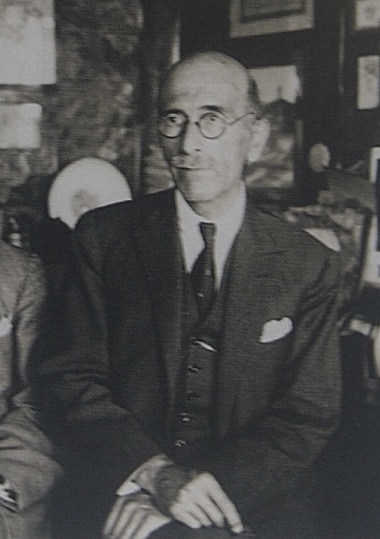

Personal details
- Born: 1874 Constantinople, Ottoman Empire
- Died: 10 May 1933 (aged 58–59) Istanbul, Turkey

Rıfat Osman Bey (18 February 1874 Istanbul – 10 May 1933) was a Turkish physician, writer and historian, who was one of the patriarchs of the pseudoscientific Sun Language Theory.

== Biography ==
He studied at Kuleli Medical High School and later became a student of the painter Süleyman Seyyid during his high school years. He continued his education at the Military Medical School.
