= Turkish nationalism =

External videos
- Turkey: Religious freedom vs nationalism -BBC

The flag of Turkey

Turkish nationalism (Turkish: Türk milliyetçiliği) is nationalism among the people of Turkey and individuals whose national identity is Turkish. Turkish nationalism consists of political and social movements and sentiments prompted by a love for Turkish culture, Turkish language and history, and a sense of pride in Turkey and Turkish people. While national consciousness in Turkish nation can be traced back centuries, nationalism has been a predominant determinant of Turkish attitudes mainly since the 20th century. Modern Turkish nationalism rose during the Tanzimat era. It also has a complicated relationship with Muslim identity, Pan-Turkism, and Turanism.

== History ==
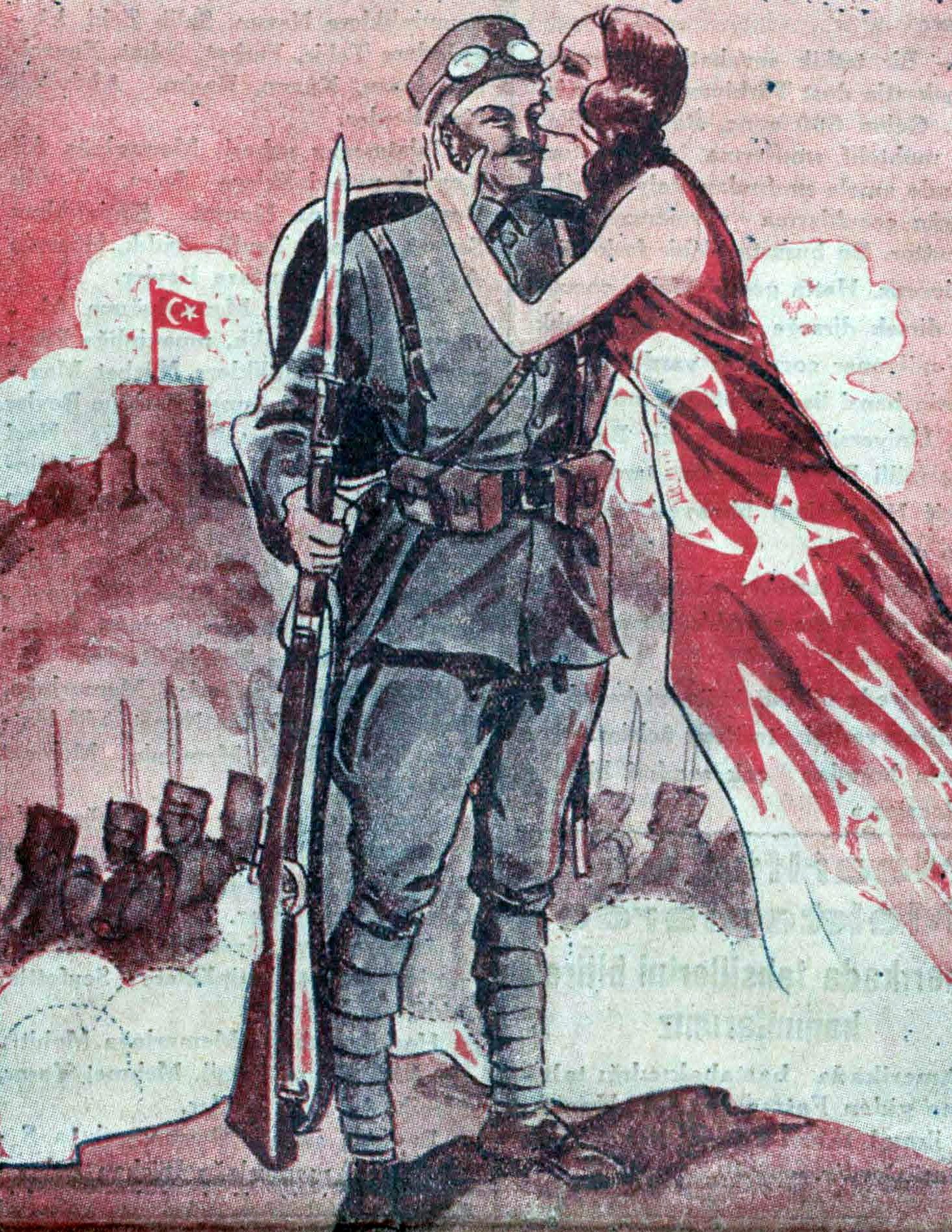
Nationalistic personification of the Liberation of İzmir (1922)

After the fall of the Ottoman Empire, Mustafa Kemal Atatürk came to power. He introduced a language reform with the aim to "cleanse" the Turkish language of foreign (mostly Arabic and Persian) influence. He also promoted the pseudohistorical Turkish History Thesis in Turkish political and educational circles from 1930s. Turkish researchers at the time like Hüseyin Cahit Yalçın and Rıfat Osman Bey also came up with the idea that Early Sumerians were proto-Turks.

The early Turkish nationalists were typically secular and often influenced by Ziya Gökalp (1876–1924). Gökalp aimed for the Turkification of Islam; that the Quran should be translated from Arabic into Turkish, and that the adhan should be recited in Turkish instead of Arabic from the Minarets. During the early years of the republic, religious traditions were not important and Turkish nationalists were much more open to the westernization of the Turkish society.

== Genocide of Anatolian minorities ==
The Armenian genocide, the Greek genocide, the Assyrian genocide took place between 1912 and 1923 due to the desire to transform the multi-ethnic Ottoman Empire into a Turkish nation-state.

Since the leadership of Mustafa Kemal Atatürk, Turkish nationalism has been exclusionary to every non-Muslim and non-Sunni minority. Although nominally secular, successive Turkish governments privileged Sunni Islam as the core of Turkish national identity and pursued ethnic and religious homogenization, which included mass violence against non-Muslim and non-Sunni groups. In addition to Christians, the Alevi Kurds of Dersim were massacred in 1938.

In the first two generations of Turkish history textbooks, Greeks occupied the place of the sole "Significant Other". After the 1970s, the Greeks and Armenians together became the most prominent "Others" of the Turkish nation.

== Variants ==
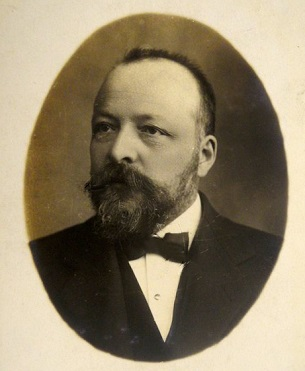
Mehmet Emin Yurdakul, Turkish nationalist writer and politician; his writings and poems had a major impact on defining the term vatan ("Homeland" or "Motherland").

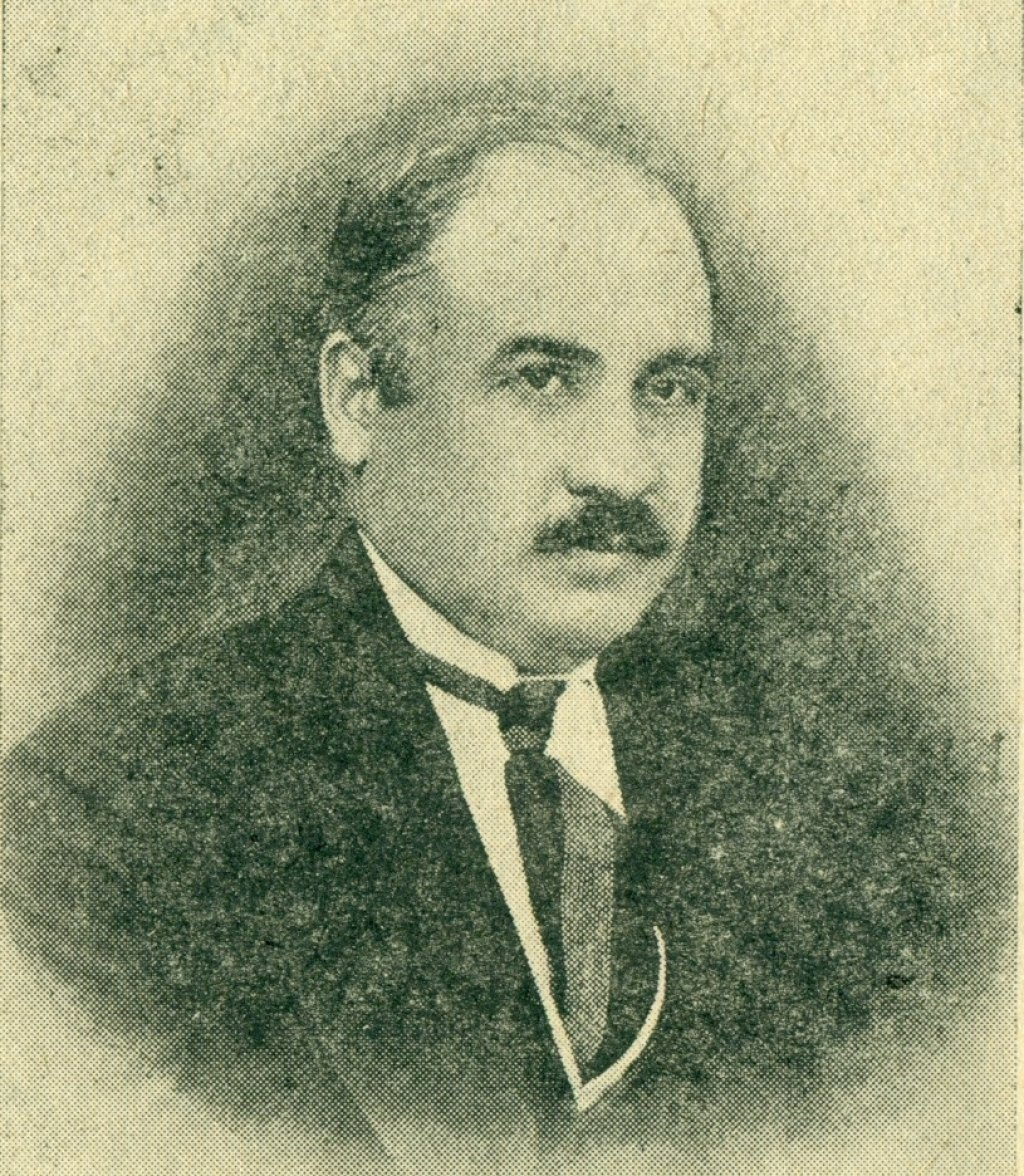
Ziya Gökalp, ideologue of Turkish nationalism and later member of Mustafa Kemal's Grand National Assembly

Ideologies associated with Turkish nationalism include Pan-Turkism or Turanism (a form of ethnic or racial essentialism), Turkish–Islamic nationalism, Anatolianism (which considers the Turkish nation as a separate entity which developed after the Seljuk conquest of Anatolia in the 11th century), and secular, civic nationalist Kemalism (which defines the "Turks" as the national identity of the people of Turkey). The term "ultranationalism" is often used to describe Turkish nationalism.

=== Kemalism or Turkish state nationalism ===
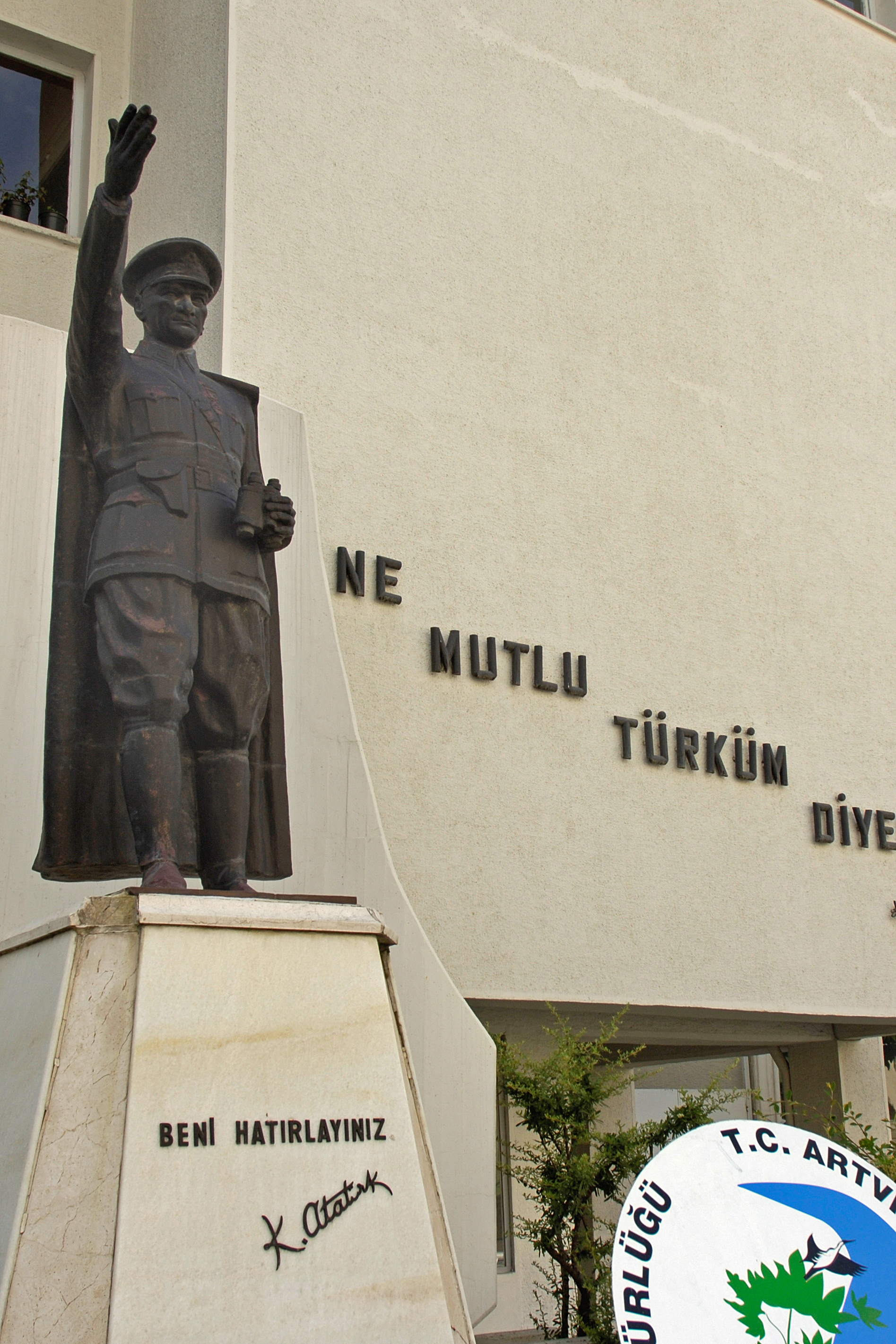
Atatürk monument in Artvin, captured during the 1921 Turkish invasion of Georgia. On the wall, it says: "How happy is the one who says I am a Turk".

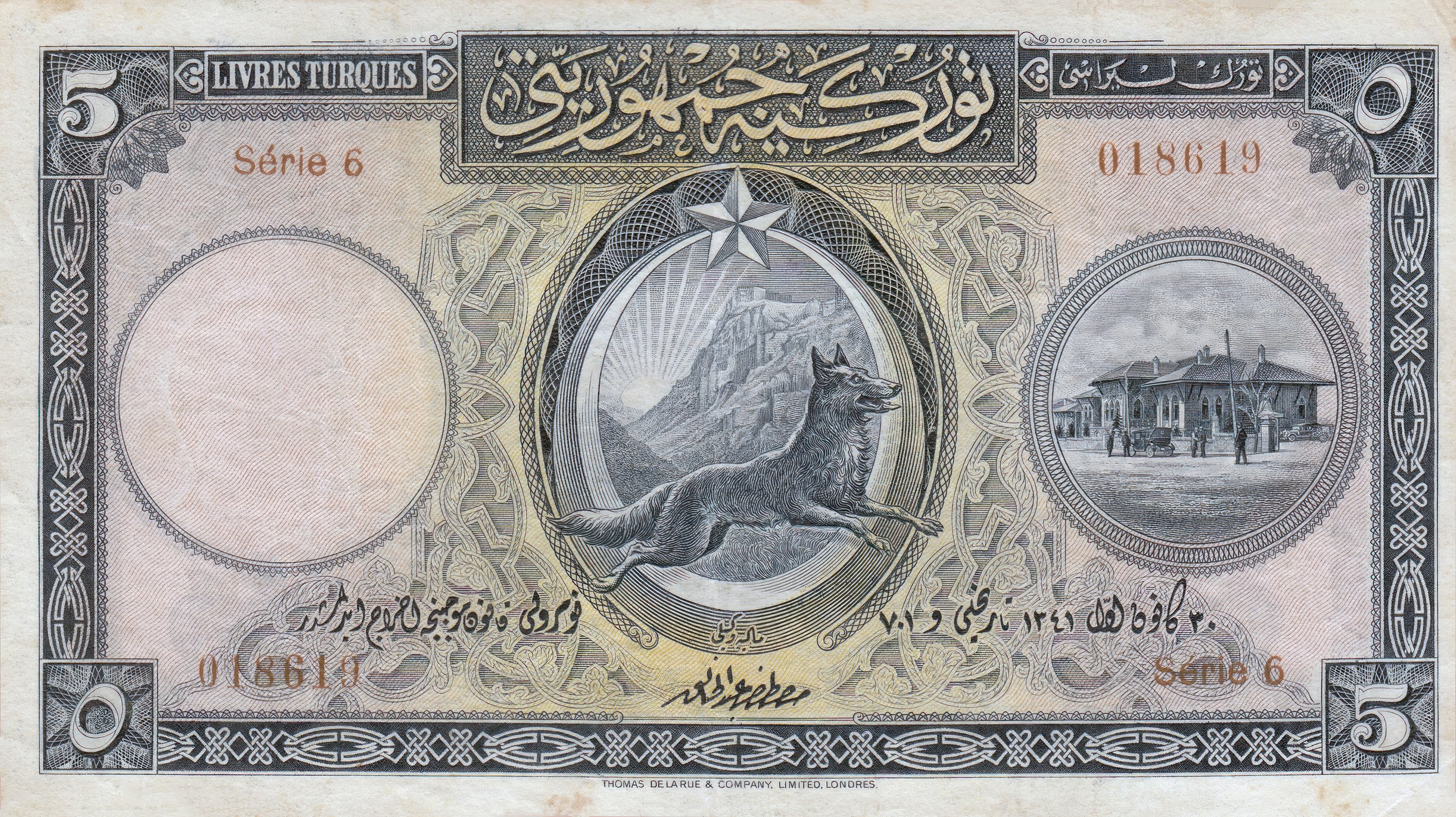
A 5-lira banknote from the Atatürk era in Turkey. The grey wolf is a symbol of Turkish nationalism, as well as of Pan-Turkism.

Implemented by Atatürk, the founding ideology of the Republic of Turkey features nationalism (Turkish: milliyetçilik) as one of its six principles. Following the proclamation of the republic in 1923, the Kemalism or "Turkish state nationalism" became the official state ideology and the guiding principle behind the widespread socio-political reforms.

The Kemalist revolution aimed to create a nation state from the remnants of the multi-religious and multi-ethnic Ottoman Empire. Kemalist nationalism originates from the social contract theories, especially from the civic nationalist principles advocated by Jean-Jacques Rousseau and his Social Contract. The Kemalist perception of social contract was effected by the dissolution of the Ottoman Empire which was perceived as a product of failure of the Ottoman "Millet" system and the ineffective Ottomanism policy. Kemalist nationalism, after experiencing the Ottoman Empire's breakdown, defined the social contract as its "highest ideal".

In the 1930s Kemalism became an all-encompassing state ideology based on Atatürk's sayings and writings. The Kemalist definition of nationality was integrated to Article 66 of the Constitution of the Republic of Turkey. Legally, every citizen is defined as a "Turk", regardless of ethnicity or religion. Turkish nationality law states that he or she can be deprived of his/her nationality only through an act of treason.

=== Pan-Turkism ===
"Turanist" nationalism began with the Turanian Society, founded in 1839 by the Tatars of the Russian Empire. It was then followed, in 1908, with the Turkish Society, which later became the Turkish Hearths and eventually expanded to include ideologies such as Pan-Turanism and Pan-Turkism.

Pan-Turkism (Turkish: Türkçülük or Pan-Türkizm), as he stated in his book Principles of Turkism, was also a part of Ziya Gökalp's nationalist view which he called "Turkism", as an ideal of the unity of Turkic peoples.

The Young Turk Revolution which overthrew Sultan Abdul Hamid II, brought Turkish nationalists to power in the Ottoman Empire, eventually leading to the Three Pashas' control of the late Ottoman government.

=== Anatolianism ===
"Anatolianism" (Turkish: Anadoluculuk) takes as its starting point that the main source of Turkish culture should be Anatolia (Anadolu), and the main base of this thought is that the Turkish people had built a new civilization in Anatolia after 1071 when Turkish victors won a military victory at the Battle of Manzikert.

In the early Republican era, some intellectuals like Hilmi Ziya Ülken, Mehmet Râif Ogan and Nurettin Topçu proposed that the origins of the Turkish nationalism should be sought in Anatolia, not in "Turan".

Hilmi Ziya Ülken, one of the founders of Anatolianism, was opposed to Neo-Ottomanism and Pan-Islamism, as well as to Turanism. In 1919, Ülken wrote a book titled Anadolunun Bugünki Vazifeleri (Present Duties of Anatolia), but it was not published. Ülken and friends published the periodical Anadolu. They worked to form an alternative philosophy to Ottomanism, Islamism and Turanism.

=== Turkish-Islamic nationalism ===
The Nationalist Movement Party is a far-right party in the Grand National Assembly of Turkey.

Turkish-Islamic nationalism, also known as the Turkish-Islamic synthesis (Turkish: Türk-İslam sentezi) is an Islamic-conservative ideology that combines Turkish nationalism and Islam.

The term was coined in 1972 by the conservative historian İbrahim Kafesoğlu, who traced the Turkish–Islamic nationalism back to the first Muslim Turkic dynasty, the Karakhanids, in the 11th century. Kafesoğlu viewed the contact between the ancient steppe culture of the Turks and Islam as a process of refinement. The Turkish–Islamic nationalism was represented in the 1970s in the intellectual club Aydınlar Ocağı (Turkish: Intellectuals' Hearth) of which cofounder was Kafesoğlu. Representatives of the intellectual club explicitly formulated their thoughts and in particular their understanding of history in 1973 in the text Aydınlar Ocağı'nın Görüşü (Turkish: The View of the Intellectuals's Hearth). The starting point was anti-communism and an endeavor to counter the Marxist ideology, which was perceived as a threat to Turkish values.

After the turmoil of the 1970s with bloody clashes between political camps and the 1980 Turkish coup d'état, the junta tried, despite reservations about religious fundamentalism (Turkish: irtica), to use Islamic-conservative ideas and values to restore order and unity. Following the 1980 coup d'état, the military dictatorship made a combination of Pan-Turkism, Turkish–Islamic nationalism, and Kemalism as the official state ideology. Thought leaders of the Turkish–Islamic nationalism assumed that the Turks played a prominent role in the spread of Islam and thereby developed their national identity as part of the Islamic ummah. According to this conception, being Turkish is only possible in connection with Islam. The idea of a Turkish–Islamic nationalism is still very popular in circles of the Ülkücü movement.

=== Turkish Cypriot nationalism ===
Turkish Cypriot nationalism emphasizes the support for the independence of the Turkish Republic of Northern Cyprus (TRNC) and desires that the TRNC stay independent from Turkey while opposing the idea of a united Cyprus with the Greek-dominated Republic of Cyprus.

=== Neo-Nazism and neo-fascism ===
A neo-Nazi group existed in 1969 in İzmir, when a group of former Republican Villagers Nation Party members (precursor party of the Nationalist Movement Party) founded the association "Nasyonal Aktivite ve Zinde İnkişaf" (National Activity and Vigorous Development). The club maintained two combat units. The members wore SA uniforms and used the Hitler salute. One of the leaders (Gündüz Kapancıoğlu) was re-admitted to the Nationalist Movement Party in 1975.

Today, apart from neo-fascist Grey Wolves and the Turkish ultranationalist MHP, there are some neo-Nazi organizations in Turkey such as the Ataman Brotherhood, or the Turkish Nazi Party and the National Socialist Party of Turkey which are mainly based on the Internet.

=== 21st century secular nationalism ===
Following two decades long Islamic-conservative AK Party rule, many authors and scholars point out a newly emerging wave, called secular nationalism by the most. This new wave is yet to acquire a precise form and discourse, but attracted interest mainly from young adults who are disillusioned with government policies - especially unregulated refugee influx.

== The "Insulting Turkishness" laws ==
Article 301 of the Turkish Penal Code states: The person who publicly denigrates the Turkish Nation, the Republic of Turkey, the Grand National Assembly of Turkey, the Government of the Republic of Turkey and the judicial organs of the State, shall be punished with imprisonment of six months to two years. The article also states, expressions of thought intended to criticize shall not constitute a crime, and that it cannot be invoked without the approval of the Minister of Justice.

There have been recent indications that Turkey may repeal or modify Article 301, after the embarrassment suffered by some high-profile cases and critiques from human rights organizations. Nationalists within the judicial system, intent on derailing Turkey's full admission into the European Union, have used Article 301 to initiate trials against people like Nobel Prize–winning Turkish novelist Orhan Pamuk, the Turkish novelist Elif Shafak, and the late Hrant Dink for acknowledging the existence of the Armenian genocide.

In May 2007, a law was put into effect allowing Turkey to block websites that are deemed insulting to Atatürk.

== Animal name changes ==
The Turkish Ministry of Environment and Forestry has proposed a revision of the taxonomic nomenclature of three subspecies. The name changes removed references to Armenia and Kurdistan in the taxonomic nomenclature of subspecies of each animal.

The declared taxonomic nomenclature for the three subspecies is effective for the Turkish Environment and Forestry Ministry. According to a statement released by the same ministry on 4 March 2005, the original names were divisive and contradicted "Turkish unity". The ministry has been quoted stating:

Unfortunately there are many other species in Turkey which were named this way with ill intentions. This ill intent is so obvious that even species only found in our country were given names against Turkey's unity.

Some Turkish officials have said that the original taxonomic nomenclature was intended in bad faith to imply that Armenians and Kurds resided in the areas where the animals lived.

Andrew Polaszek, the executive secretary of the International Commission on Zoological Nomenclature, the organization responsible for establishing species naming conventions, has said in an interview that acceptance of the revised names would depend upon article publications in scientific journals, but that they were otherwise acceptable from a scientific viewpoint. As of 2013, the changes affect only official taxonomic nomenclature usage by the Turkish government, and the International Code of Zoological Nomenclature does not recognize the name changes.

Animal	Scientific name	Proposed new name
Kurdistan red fox	Vulpes vulpes kurdistanica	Vulpes vulpes
Wild sheep	Ovis armeniana	Ovis orientalis anatolicus
Roe deer	Capreolus capreolus armenius	Capreolus capreolus capreolus

== See also ==
- Conservatism in Turkey
- How happy is the one who says I am a Turk
- Ottomanism
- 16 Great Turkic Empires
- Place name changes in Turkey

== Sources ==
- Arman, Murat (2007). "The Sources Of Banality In Transforming Turkish Nationalism" (PDF). CEU Political Science Journal. 2 (2): 133–151. CEEOL 108084.
- Eissenstat, Howard. "Anatolianism: The History of a Failed Metaphor of Turkish Nationalism". Paper presented at Middle East Studies Association Conference, Washington, D.C., November 2002.
- Tachau, Frank (1963). "The Search for National Identity among the Turks". Die Welt des Islams. 8 (3): 165–176. doi:10.2307/1570234. JSTOR 1570234.
