= Turkish Hearths =

Non governmental organization in Turkey

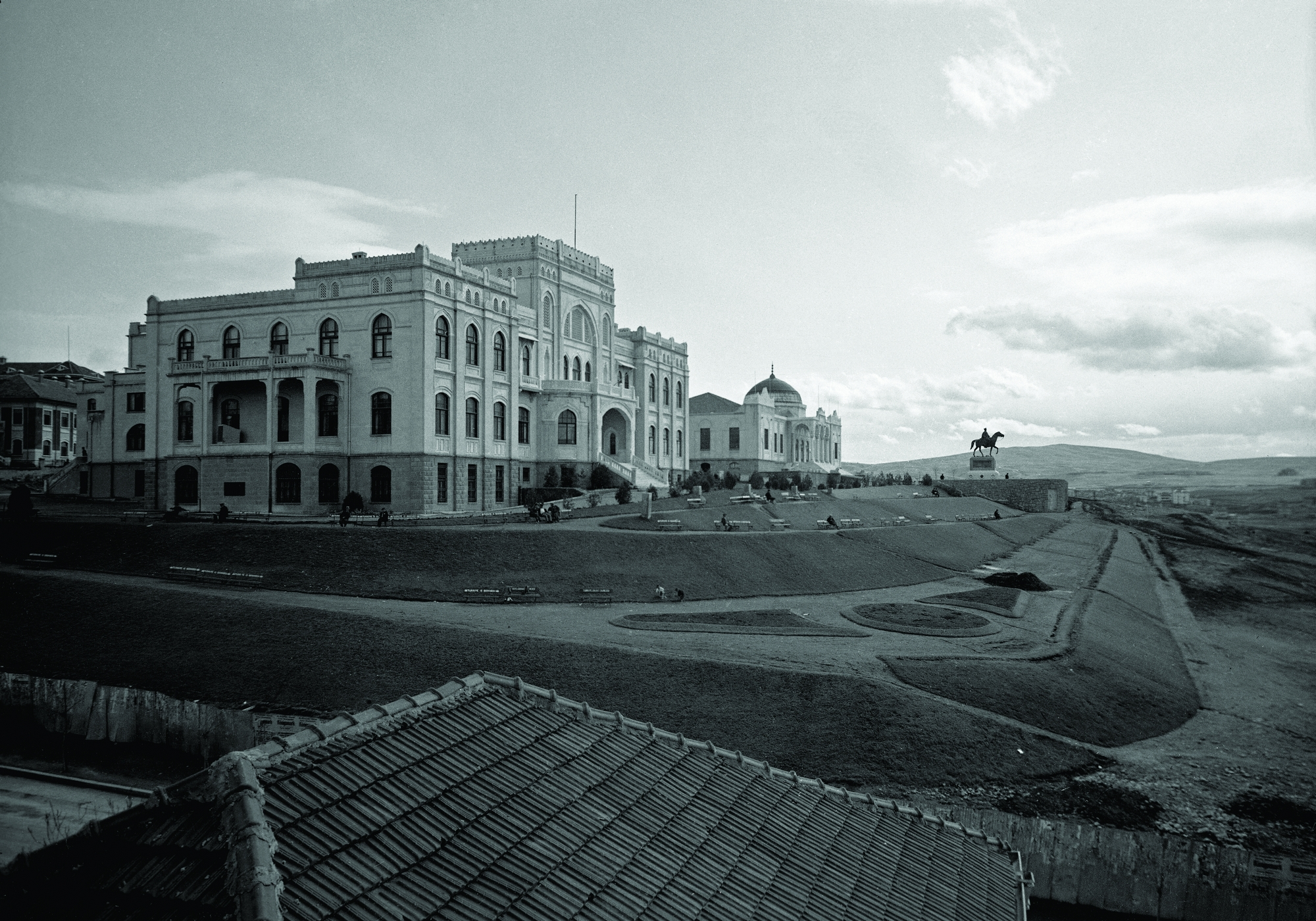
- View of the Turkish Hearths Headquarters in the 1930s
- Founded: 1912, Istanbul, Ottoman Empire
- Type: Turkish cultural group
- Legal status: Independent (1912–1927) part of Republican People's Party (after 1927)
- Purpose: To spread and develop Turkish culture and language and to modernize Turkey
- Headquarters: Istanbul; Ankara (after 1927)
- Leader: Hamdullah Suphi Tanrıöver
- Affiliations: Republican People's Party
- Website: https://www.turkocaklari.org.tr/

Turkish Hearths (Turkish: Türk Ocakları) is a non-governmental organization (NGO) in Turkey. It was founded in 1912, during the last years of the Ottoman Empire, in a period when almost all non-Turkish elements had their own national committees, and Turkish Hearths was founded as a Turkish national committee.

== History ==
=== First term ===
Following a meeting of the Young Turks, the Turkish nationalists, on 3 July 1911, the NGO was officially founded in Istanbul on 25 March 1912. According to the statute of Turkish Hearths, the activities were mostly concentrated on culture and education, raising the social, economic and intellectual level of the Turkish people for the perfection of the Turkish language and race. It published books and magazines, offered courses to raise the Turkish nationalist heritage, founded clubs and organized literary and artistic performances. It also supported students with lodging and health care. After the Russian revolution in 1917 the president of the Turkish Hearths, Hamdullah Suphi Tanrıöver, also welcomed refugees of Turkic origin. During the Turkish War of Independence (1919–1923), Turkish Hearths supported the meetings held in Istanbul against the occupation of Istanbul. Some members of the organization were arrested by the Allies of World War I, and the activities of the Turkish Hearths were suspended.

After the War of Independence, the Turkish Hearths resumed its former activities with the support of the newly founded Turkish Republic. They were re-established in 1924, and the number of its branch offices increased from 135 in 1925 to 255 in 1930. These branches provided Mustafa Kemal Atatürk with locations for his speeches when he was on tour in the country. The hearths became a social institution, founded libraries and organized seminars on foreign languages, keeping a household, reading or writing among others. In April 1930, the Committee for the Study of Turkish History (TOTTTH) was established as an additional department of the Turkish Hearths. Its first task was to publish a book "General Themes of Turkish History" (Türk Tarihinin Ana Hatlari) which influenced the development of the Turkish History Thesis.

In 1927, the Turkish Hearths' building for the central committee was established in the Çağaloğlu neighborhood of Istanbul and inaugurated by Ismet Inönü, who was a member of the Turkish Hearths since 1917. On the 23 April 1930, a Turkish Historical Commission was established as an additional department of the Turkish Hearths. The central office was moved from Istanbul to Ankara, and a spectacular building, the current building of State Art and Sculpture Museum, as its headquarters was built by using non-governmental funds. However, in the 1930s, the organization lost its non-political character, and on 10 April 1931 it merged into the Republican People's Party (CHP), the ruling party of Turkey at that time. Its head office was handed over to Peoples' Houses, a state sponsored enlightenment project.

=== Second term ===
On 10 May 1949, the organization was reestablished with non-political character. Although the Turkish Hearts was not as active as in the previous term, beginning by 1954, it increased its activities. After a compulsory pause during the military rule, it continued after 1984.

== Activities ==
- In 1924, the periodical Türk Yurdu ("Turkish Homeland") was published as an organ of the Turkish Hearths,
- Each year, a congress is held in another city, alternatively one for history and one for culture,
- In 1988, a foundation for education and culture was established, by which scholarships to students from Turkic countries are offered,
- Since 1987, people, who contributed to the studies on Turkish culture are awarded annually.

== Presidents ==
The following were elected as the president of the Turkish Hearths:

First term

- 1912: Ahmet Ferit Tek
- 1912: Cemil Şerif Baydur
- 1912: Hamdullah Suphi Tanrıöver (1st term)

Second term

- 1949: Hamdullah Suphi Tanrıöver (2nd term)
- 1959: Osman Turan (1st term)
- 1960: Necati Akder
- 1961: Hamdullah Suphi Tanrıöver (3rd term)
- 1966: Osman Turan (2nd term)
- 1973: Emin Bilgiç
- 1974: Orhan Düzgüneş
- 1994: Sadi Somuncuoğlu
- 1996: Nuri Gürgür
- 2012: Mehmet Öz (in office)
