= Sun Language Theory =

Turkish nationalist pseudoscientific theory

The Sun Language Theory (Turkish: Güneş Dil Teorisi) was a Turkish pseudolinguistic, pseudoscientific quasi-hypothesis developed in Turkey in the 1930s that proposed that all human languages are descendants of one proto-Turkic primal language. The theory's promotion of Turks as a progenitor race led to it finding favour among Turkish ultranationalists, who used it to justify their nationalist ideology.

It claims that primal language had close phonemic resemblances to Turkish and, because of this, all other languages can be traced back to Turkic roots. According to the theory, this primal language originated among Central Asian worshippers who created it as a means to salute the omnipotence of the sun and its life-giving qualities, hence the name.

== Origins ==
Influences on the theory included:

- the ideas of the French historian Hilaire de Barenton, expressed in L'Origine des Langues, des Religions et des Peuples ("The Origin of Languages, Religions and Peoples"), that all languages originated from hieroglyphs and cuneiform used by Sumerians. Turkish linguists claimed a Turkish origin for the Sumerians, and therefore the origin of language was Turkish.
- a paper of the Austrian linguist Hermann F. Kvergić of Vienna entitled "La psychologie de quelques éléments des langues Turques" ("The Psychology of Some Elements of the Turkic Languages"). He also conducted some research on the theory with support of the Turkish Embassy in Vienna.

During ten months in late 1935 and early 1936, Turkish linguists from the Turkish Language Society developed the Sun Language Theory which was presented as the source of all languages in the Third Turkish Language Congress.

== History ==
The theory counted on the approval of the first president of the Republic of Turkey, Mustafa Kemal Atatürk, who not only gave the theory official backing and material support but was also an important contributor to its development. It received the formal support of the Turkish Government during the Third Turkish Language Congress in 1936. During the same congress the vast majority of the international non-Turkish scholars including Friedrich Giese opposed the theory. One of the few non-Turkish linguists who supported the theory was Kvergić.

Since the theory claimed that all words had originated from Turkish, it was not deemed necessary anymore to replace all foreign loanwords in the language, a process that had been initiated before. Indeed, one of the goals of embracing the theory may have been to maintain a number of common loanwords (mainly from Arabic and Persian). Initially the theory was taught only in the Turkology departments of the Turkish Universities, but on the order of Mustafa Kemal Atatürk, it was to be taught in all departments as a mandatory assignment. The Sun Language Theory lost its prominent role shortly after the death of Mustafa Kemal in November 1938 and was not even mentioned in the next Turkish Language Congress in 1942.

== Tenets ==
As described in a 1936 New York Times article on the curriculum of the newly opened School of Language, History, and Geography of Ankara University, the theory

claims that [insofar as] the Sumerians, being Turks, originat[ed] in Central Asia, all languages also consequently originated there and [were] first used by the Turks. The first language, in fact, came into being in this way: Prehistoric man, i.e., Turks in the most primitive stage, was so struck by the effects of the sun on life that he made of it a deity whence sprang all good and evil. Thence came to him light, darkness, warmth, and fire, with it were associated all ideas of time: height, distance, movement, size, and give expression to his feelings. The sun was thus the first thing to which a name was given. It was "ag" [sic] (pronounced agh), and from this syllable all words in use today are derived. This, briefly, is the theory about the "sun language," and with the new conception of Turkish history it will be taught in the new Angora school.

Based upon a heliocentric view of the origin of civilization and human languages, the theory claimed that the Turkish language was the language which all civilized languages derived from. According to the theory, the first people to speak were the superior race of the Alpine Brachycephalic Turks, which spread throughout the earth in the aftermath of a climate catastrophe, therefore providing the people in all civilizations with the benefits of the language.

Some of the words provided with false Turkish etymologies through the practice of goropism were God, attributed to the Turkish kut; bulletin from Turkish bülten, belleten; or electric from Uyghur yaltrık (shine). Additionally foreign words like the French wattman, in French stemming from watt and man, were claimed to be of Turkish origin by a Turkish scholar. Other prominent examples are Greek mythological figures like Aphrodite from avrat, or Artemis from tertemiz. According to linguist Ghil'ad Zuckermann, "it is possible that the Sun Language Theory was adopted by Atatürk in order to legitimize the Arabic and Persian words which the Turkish language authorities did not manage to uproot. This move compensated for the failure to provide a neologism for every foreignism/loanword."

In February 2018, Ahmet Ardıç attempted to map the Voynich manuscript to a form of Old Turkish, which received criticism by linguist Koen Gheuens for being associated with Goropism.

== See also ==
- Turkish History Thesis
- Adamic language
- Johannes Goropius Becanus
- Japhetic theory
- Khazars
- Lemurian Tamil
- Kemalist historiography
- Western Pseudohistory Theory
