= Anti-Armenian sentiment in Turkey =

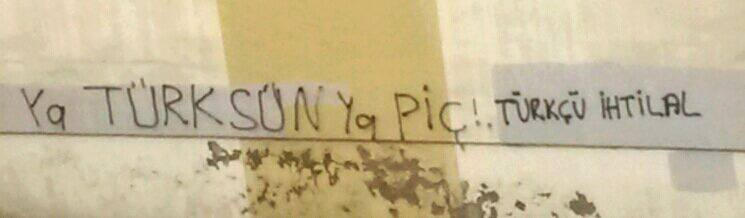
'You Are Either a Turk, or a Bastard,' near the wall of an Armenian church in Kadıköy, Istanbul

Anti-Armenian sentiment or Armenophobia in Turkey is hostility towards and persecution of Armenians manifesting in Turkey. It dates back to the Ottoman Empire, something that eventually culminated in the Armenian genocide. Today, anti-Armenian sentiment is widespread in Turkish society. In a 2011 survey in Turkey, 73.9% of respondents admitted having unfavorable views toward Armenians. According to Minority Rights Group, while the government recognizes Armenians as a minority group, as used in Turkey this term denotes second-class status. The word "Armenian" is widely used as an insult in Turkey by both civilians and by politicians.

Expressions of anti-Armenian sentiment in Turkey include religious discrimination and violence towards Armenians, destruction and desecration of Armenian cultural heritage in Turkey, vandalism towards Armenian churches, monuments and signs in Armenian language, and denial of the Armenian genocide. Denial of the Armenian genocide has been the policy of every government of Turkey.

Other examples include denying Armenian churches legal status, restricting clergy training, interfering in leadership, and seizing community properties, and portrayals of Christians as foreign or disloyal.

== History ==
The presence of Armenians in Anatolia is documented since the sixth century BCE, almost two millennia before Turkish presence in the area. The Ottoman Empire effectively treated Armenians and other non-Muslims as second-class citizens under Islamic rule, even after the nineteenth-century Tanzimat reforms intended to equalize their status. Although it was possible for Armenians to achieve status and wealth in the Ottoman Empire, as a community they were never accorded more than "second-class citizen" status and were regarded as fundamentally alien to the Muslim character of Ottoman society.

Within the social hierarchy of Muslim Ottoman society, Armenians occupied a subordinate position due to the fact that they were not Muslim. Non-Muslims and Christians, in particular, were derided as Giaours ("infidels"). The subordinate status was reified through state-sanctioned attire. In 1580, the Ottoman authorities imposed sumptuary regulations on non-Muslim subjects that reflected and visibly reinforced their subordinate social status. Non-Muslims were formally prohibited from dressing like Muslims and were required to wear distinctive clothing, a policy justified on the grounds that their proper condition under Islamic law was one of "humility and abjection". Violations of such clothing restrictions could be punishable by death.

In 1823, during the Greek War of Independence and an Ottoman war with Persia, tensions arose between the Ottoman central government and the Janissaries over the proposed expulsion of a member of the Bektashi Order, a Muslim Sufi religious order closely associated with the Janissary corps. The government suspected the man of spying for Persia, while the Janissaries revered and protected him. During negotiations, some Janissaries attempted to redirect attention from the suspected spy by arguing that a more serious security concern was posed by the large Orthodox Christian and Armenian populations of — comprising half of Constantinople's population — whom they said could not be trusted. Citing rumors that European powers were supporting the Greek rebels, they asked the government either to expel the city's Orthodox Christians and Armenians, to massacre them, or to permit the Janissaries to do so. The central government rejected the proposal, although Sultan Mahmud II expressed distrust toward the Orthodox Christian population. Historian Masayuki Ueno interprets the episode as evidence that the atmosphere of suspicion created by the Greek revolt extended beyond the Greeks themselves: despite their different ethnic and confessional identity, Armenians also became objects of suspicion among members of the Muslim elite. The incident therefore illustrates an early instance in which Armenians were collectively portrayed as a potential security threat and subjected to calls for expulsion or mass violence, within the broader anti-Christian tensions of the period.

British ethnographer William M. Ramsay who spent 20 years conducting research in Turkey in the late 1800s, described the attitudes towards Armenians as follows: "Turkish rule...meant unutterable contempt... The Armenians...were dogs and pigs...to be spat upon, if their shadow darkened a Turk, to be outraged, to be the mats on which he wiped the mud from his feet. Conceive the inevitable result of centuries of slavery, of subjection to insult and scorn, centuries in which nothing that belonged to the Armenian, neither his property, his house, his life."

Beginning in 1880, the name Armenia was forbidden to be used in official documents of the Ottoman Empire, as part of a Turkification campaign to play down the role of Armenians in the region. By the 1890s, Armenians faced forced conversions to Islam and increasing land seizures, which led a handful to join revolutionary parties such as the Armenian Revolutionary Federation (ARF, also known as Dashnaktsutyun). In 1895, revolts among the Armenian subjects of the Ottoman Empire in pursuit of equal treatment led to Sultan Abdül Hamid's decision to massacre at least 100,000 of Armenians in the state-sponsored Hamidian massacres.

In 1909, the authorities failed to prevent the Adana massacre, which resulted in a series of anti-Armenian pogroms throughout the district resulting in the deaths of 20,000–30,000 Armenians. The Ottoman authorities denied any responsibility for these massacres, accusing Western powers of meddling and Armenians of provocation, while presenting Muslims as the main victims and failing to punish the perpetrators. These same tropes of denial would be employed later to deny the Armenian genocide.

The Committee of Union and Progress (CUP) came to power in two coups in 1908 and in 1913. In the meantime, the Ottoman Empire lost almost all of its European territory in the Balkan Wars; the CUP blamed Christian treachery for this defeat. Hundreds of thousands of Muslim refugees fled to Anatolia as a result of the wars; many were resettled in the Armenian-populated eastern provinces (Western Armenia) and harbored resentment against Christians. In August 1914, CUP representatives appeared at an ARF conference demanding that in the event of war with the Russian Empire, the ARF incite Russian Armenians to intervene on the Ottoman side. The ARF declined, instead declaring that Armenians should fight for the countries in which they were citizens. In October 1914, the Ottoman Empire entered World War I on the side of the Central Powers.

=== Armenian genocide ===
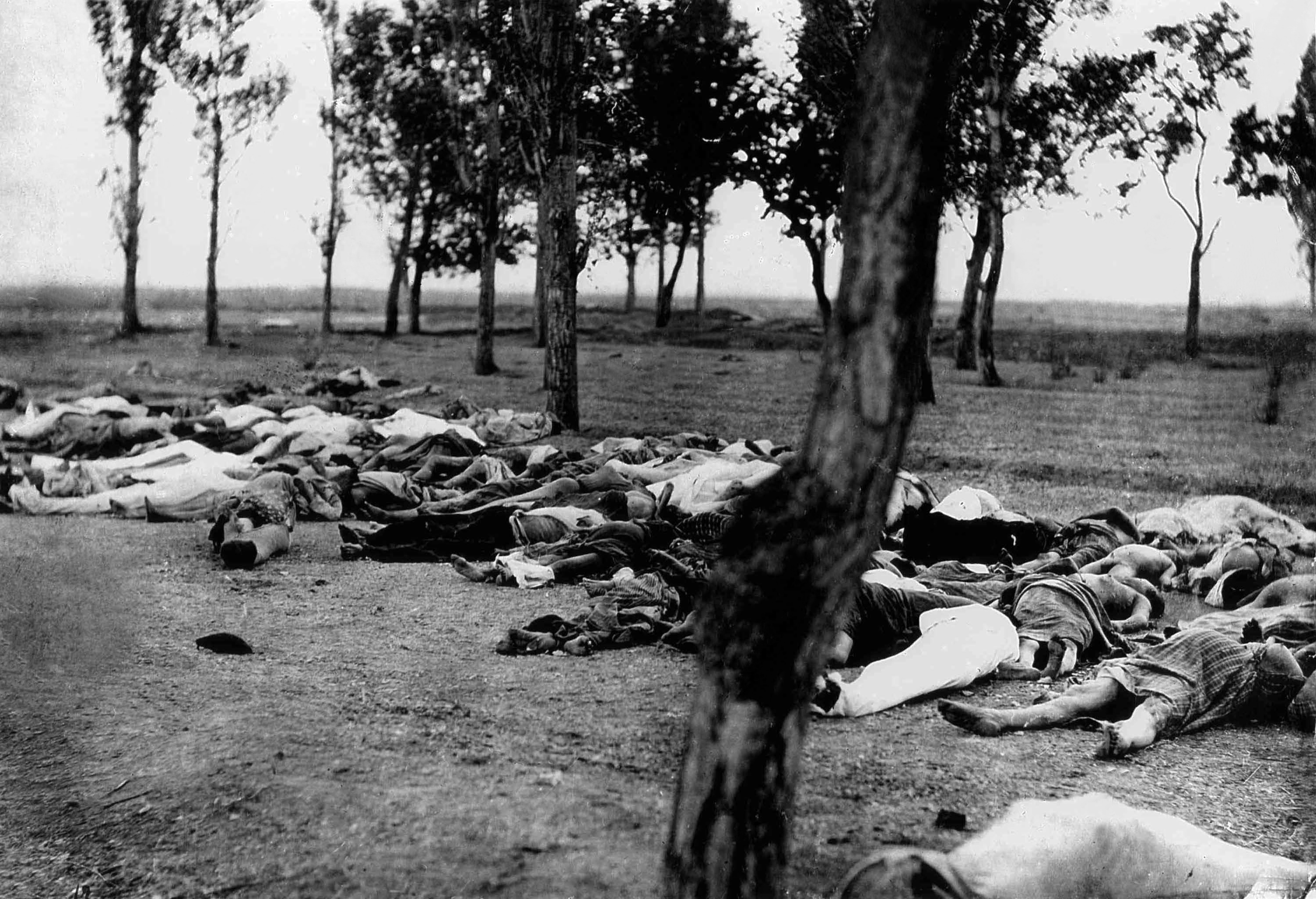
The Armenian genocide was the Ottoman government's systematic extermination of its Armenian subjects within the territory constituting the present-day Republic of Turkey. The total number of Armenians who were killed has been estimated at 1.5 million.

During the Ottoman invasion of Russian and Persian territory in late 1914, Ottoman paramilitaries massacred local Armenians. A few Ottoman Armenian soldiers defected to Russia—seized upon by both the CUP and later deniers as evidence of Armenian treachery—but the Armenian volunteers in the Russian army were mostly Russian Armenians. Massacres turned into genocide following the catastrophic Ottoman defeat by Russia in the Battle of Sarikamish (January 1915), which was blamed on Armenian treachery. Armenian soldiers and officers were removed from their posts pursuant to a 25 February order issued by Minister of War Enver Pasha. In the minds of the Ottoman leaders, isolated incidents of Armenian resistance were taken as evidence of a general insurrection.

In mid-April, after Ottoman leaders had decided to commit genocide, Armenians barricaded themselves in the eastern city of Van. The defense of Van served as a pretext for anti-Armenian actions at the time and remains a crucial element in works that seek to deny or justify the genocide. On 24 April, hundreds of Armenian intellectuals were arrested in Constantinople. Systematic deportation of Armenians began, given a cover of legitimacy by the 27 May deportation law. The Special Organization guarded the deportation convoys consisting mostly of women, children, and the elderly who were subject to systematic rape and massacres. Their destination was the Syrian Desert, where those who survived the death marches were left to die of starvation or disease in makeshift camps. Deportation was only carried out in the areas away from active fighting; near the front lines, Armenians were massacred outright. The leaders of the CUP ordered the deportations, with interior minister Talat Pasha, aware that he was sending the Armenians to their deaths, taking a leading role. In a cable dated 13 July 1915, Talat stated that "the aim of the Armenian deportations is the final solution of the Armenian Question."

Historians estimate that 1.5 to 2 million Armenians lived in the Ottoman Empire in 1915, of whom 800,000 to 1.2 million were deported or killed during the genocide. In 1916, a wave of massacres targeted the surviving Armenians in Syria; by the end of the year, only 200,000 were still alive. An estimated 100,000 to 200,000 women and children were integrated into Muslim families through such methods as forced marriage, adoption, and conversion. The state confiscated and redistributed property belonging to murdered or deported Armenians.

=== Post-genocide ===
After the genocide ended, following the Turkish War of Independence and the creation of the Republic of Turkey in 1923, the Turkish government enacted on 15 April 1923 the "Law of Abandoned Properties" which confiscated properties of any Armenian who was not present on their property, regardless of the circumstances of the reason. While local courts were authorized to appraise the value of any property and provide an avenue for property owners to make claims, the law prohibited the use of any power of attorney by absent property holders, preventing them from filing suit without returning to the country. In addition, the defendant in the case would be the state of Turkey which had created specially tasked committees to deal with each case.

In addition to this law, the Turkish government continued revoking the citizenship of many people with a law on 23 May 1927 which stated that "Ottoman subjects who during the War of Independence took no part in the National movement, kept out of Turkey and did not return from 24 July 1923 to the date of the publication of this law, have forfeited Turkish nationality." (Note: Law No. 1042 of the Republic of Turkey, 23 May 1927) Additionally, a further law passed on 28 May 1928 stipulated that those who had lost their citizenship would be expelled from Turkey, not allowed to return, and that their property would be confiscated by the Turkish government, and Turkish migrants would be resettled in the properties.

The incident of The Twenty Classes was a policy used by the Turkish government to conscript the male non-Turkish minority population mainly consisting of Armenians, Greeks and Jews during World War II. All of the twenty classes consisted of male minority population, including the elders and mentally ill. They were given no weapons and quite often they did not even wear military uniforms. These non-Muslims were gathered in labor battalions where no Turks were enlisted. They were allegedly forced to work under very bad conditions. The prevailing and widespread point of view on the matter was that wishing to partake in the World War II, Turkey gathered in advance all unreliable non-Turkish men regarded as a “fifth column”.

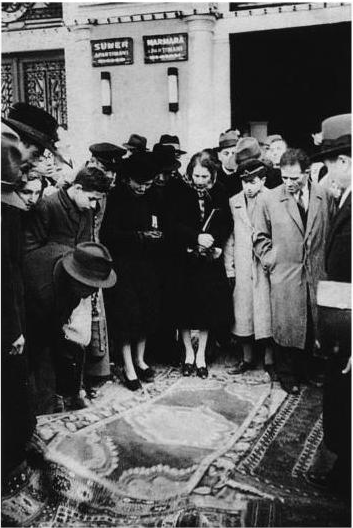
Non-Muslims auctioning off their furniture to pay for the Varlık Vergisi

On November 11, 1942, Turkey instaured the Varlık Vergisi, a tax mostly levied on non-Muslim citizens with the stated aim of raising funds for the country's defense in case of an eventual entry into World War II. The tax was supposed to be paid by all citizens of Turkey, but inordinately higher rates were imposed on the country's non-Muslim inhabitants, in an arbitrary and predatory way. The underlying reason for the tax was to inflict financial ruin on the minority non-Muslim citizens of the country, end their prominence in the country's economy and transfer the assets of non-Muslims to the Muslim bourgeoisie. It was a discriminatory measure which taxed non-Muslims up to ten times more heavily and resulted in a significant amount of wealth and property being transferred to Muslims. It was imposed on the fixed assets, such as landed estates, building owners, real estate brokers, businesses, and industrial enterprises of all citizens, but especially targeted the minorities.

Although the tax affected several non-Muslims groups in Turkey like Jews, Greeks, Armenians, Assyrians, some Kurds, and Levantines, who controlled a large portion of the economy, it was Armenians who were most heavily taxed.

Population group	Amount of taxes to be paid
Christian Armenians	232%
Jews	179%
Christian Greeks	156%
Muslims	4.94%

These taxes led to the destruction of the remaining non-Muslim merchant class in Turkey, the lives and finances of many non-Muslim families were ruined. The taxes were very high, some times higher than a person's entire wealth. This resulted in a number of suicides of ethnic minority citizens in Istanbul.

In September 1955, the state-sponsored Istanbul pogrom took place. The main target of the pogroms were Greeks, but Armenians were attacked as well. The material damage was considerable, with damage to 5317 properties. The American consulate estimates that 59% of the businesses were Greek-owned, 17% were Armenian-owned, 12% were Jewish-owned, and 10% were Muslim-owned; while 80% of the homes were Greek-owned, 9% were Armenian-owned, 3% were Jewish-owned, and 5% were Muslim-owned.

In 1974 new legislation was passed that stated that non-Muslim trusts could not own more property than that which had been registered under their name in 1936. As a result, more than 1,400 assets (included churches, schools, residential buildings, hospitals, summer camps, cemeteries, and orphanages) of the Istanbul Armenian community since 1936 were retrospectively classified as illegal acquisitions and seized by the state. Under the legislation, the Turkish courts rendered Turkish citizens of non-Turkish descent as "foreigners", thereby placing them under the same legal regulations of any foreign company or property holder living outside of Turkey who was not a Turkish national. The provisions further provided that foundations belonging to non-Muslims are a potential "threat" to national security. The process involved returning any property acquired after 1936, whether through lottery, will, donation, or purchase, to their former owners or inheritors. If former owners had died leaving no inheritors, the property was to be transferred to specified governmental agencies such as the Treasury or the Directorate General of Foundations.

On 3 May 1984, a hit-team headed attack undertaken by Grey Wolves member Abdullah Çatlı and paid for by the Turkish National Intelligence Organization. committed the Alfortville Armenian Genocide Memorial bombings, an attack on a heavily Armenian populated district of Alfortville, Val-de-Marne, Île-de-France. The target chosen for the attack was a memorial dedicated to the victims of the Armenian genocide on the rue Étienne Dolet which was inaugurated on 24 April 1984, the 69th anniversary of the Armenian genocide. The Turkish press denounced the monument as a "monument of hate". About a week after the inauguration, three bombs were reported to have exploded on 3 May 1984, resulting in thirteen injuries, two of them serious. The monument, made of Khachkar stone, was severely damaged in the blasts.

A report published by Minority Rights Group in 1987 identified a pattern of state-imposed measures that weakened the Armenian community in Turkey across institutional, financial, cultural, and administrative domains. Through legal restrictions, bureaucratic obstacles, and limitations on communal rights, these policies constrained the community’s ability to preserve its heritage, manage its institutions, and exercise protections guaranteed under national and international law.

These measures included the confiscation or non-recognition of communal property and endowments, restrictions on construction, repair, and restoration of churches and charitable institutions, and the freezing of proceeds from property sales. Armenian schools were subjected to extensive state oversight, including the appointment of Turkish sub-directors, obstruction of Armenian administrative appointments, and policies that led to shortages of Armenian-language teachers. Additional restrictions affected student enrollment, boarding school permissions, and routine cultural or religious practices within educational institutions. Communal self-governance was further undermined by the abolition of central representative bodies and legal reclassification of Armenian organizations that stripped them of property ownership rights.

== Contemporary ==
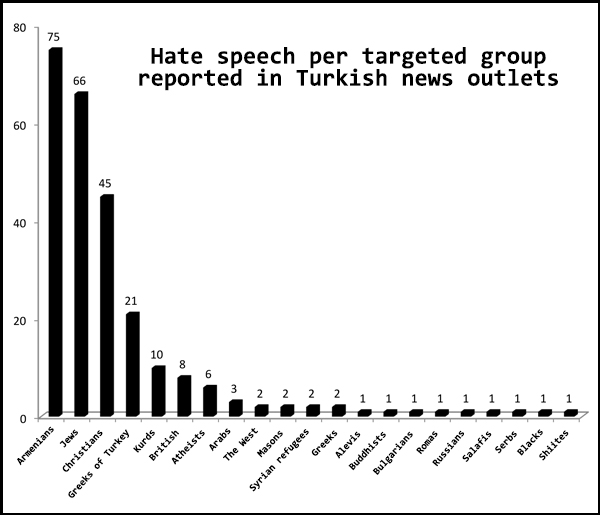
Accounts of hate speech towards targeted groups in Turkish news outlets with Armenians shown as being targeted the most according to a January–April 2014 Media Watch on Hate Speech and Discriminatory Language Report

"The new generations are being taught to see Armenians not as human, but [as] an entity to be despised and destroyed, the worst enemy. And the school curriculum adds fuel to the existing fires."

— Turkish lawyer Fethiye Çetin

Anti-Armenian sentiment persists in Turkey on institutional and social levels.

Turkish professor Cenk Saraçoğlu argues that anti-Armenian attitudes in Turkey "are no longer constructed and shaped by social interactions between the 'ordinary people' ... Rather, the Turkish media and state promote and disseminate an overtly anti-Armenian discourse."

The term 'Armenian' is frequently used in politics to discredit political opponents. In 2008, Canan Arıtman, a deputy of İzmir from the Republican People's Party (CHP), called President Abdullah Gül an 'Armenian'. Arıtman was then prosecuted for "insulting" the president. Similarly, in 2010, Turkish journalist Cem Büyükçakır approved a comment on his website claiming that President Abdullah Gül's mother was an Armenian. Büyükçakır was then sentenced to 11 months in prison for “insulting President [Abdullah] Gül”.

In February 2004, the journalist Hrant Dink published an article in the Armenian newspaper Agos titled "The Secret of Sabiha Hatun" in which a former Gaziantep resident, Hripsime Sebilciyan, claimed to be Sabiha Gökçen's niece, implying that the Turkish nationalist hero Gökçen had Armenian ancestry. The mere notion that Gökçen could have been Armenian caused an uproar throughout Turkey as Dink himself even came under fire, most notably by newspaper columnists and Turkish ultra-nationalist groups, which labeled him a traitor.

In 2010, during a football match between Bursaspor and Beşiktaş J.K., fans of Bursaspor chanted: "Armenian dogs support Beşiktaş". The chant was presumably in reference to the fact that Alen Markaryan, the leader of the Beşiktaş fan base, is of Armenian descent.

In March 2015, the mayor of Ankara, Melih Gökçek, filed a formal complaint on defamation charges against journalist Hayko Bağdat because he called him an Armenian. The complainant's petitioned that the statements by the journalist are "false and include insult and libel". Gökçek stated that the term "Armenian" meant "disgust". Gökçek sued Bağdat for 10,000 liras under a civil lawsuit. In another case Bağdat was initially sentenced to 105 days imprisonment for insulting Gökçek with the term Armenian. The sentence was converted into a fine of 1,160 Turkish Lira.

In September 2015, during the Kurdish–Turkish conflict, a video was released which captured police in Cizre announcing on a loudspeaker to the local Kurdish population that they were "Armenian bastards". A few days later, in another instance, the Cizre police made repeated announcements on loudspeaker saying "You are all Armenians" (external link of video). The police had also announced: "Armenian offspring, tonight will be your last night". On September 11, towards the end of the siege, the police made a final announcement saying: "Armenian bastards, we will kill you all, and we will exterminate you".

"For decades, the governments in Turkey tried to wipe Anatolia of any traces of Armenian identity. Murders and forced immigration were not sufficient. Names of towns, streets, even recipes were altered. Their churches became mosques. They attempted to rewrite history. Now, [they are] telling the people of Cizre, under curfew for nine days, 'You are all Armenians.' This shows us the fabricated 'one nation, one belief’ has collapsed. They have failed to destroy the Armenian ghosts of history."

— Peoples' Democratic Party (Turkey) politician Hatice Altınışık

On 9 September 2015, a crowd of Turkish youth rallying in Armenian populated districts of Istanbul chanted "We must turn these districts into Armenian and Kurdish cemeteries."

During the official state funeral of Turkish serviceman Olgun Karakoyunlu in 2015, a man exclaimed: "The PKK are all Armenians, but are hiding. I am Kurdish and a Muslim, but I am not an Armenian. The end of Armenians is near. God willingly, we will bring an end to them. Oh Armenians, whatever you do it is in vain, we know you well. Whatever you do will be in vain." Similarly, in 2007, a state-appointed imam, presiding over a funeral of a Turkish soldier killed by the PKK, said that the death was due to "Armenian bastards".

In January 2016, when Aras Özbiliz, an ethnic Armenian soccer player, was transferred to the Beşiktaş J.K. Turkish soccer team, a broad hate campaign arose throughout various social media outlets. Çarşı, the supporter group for Beşiktaş, released a statement condemning the racist campaign and reaffirming that it was against racism. The hate campaign also prompted various politicians, including Selina Doğan of the Republican People's Party, to issue a statement condemning it.

In March 2016, a parade conducted in Aşkale, initially dedicated to Turkish martyrs of World War I, turned into "a hate show" and a "hate-filled propaganda against the Armenians." During the parade, Enver Başaran, the mayor of Aşkale, expressed gratitude to the "glorious ancestors who extirpated the Armenians".

In April 2016, Barbaros Leylani, the head of the Turkish Worker's Union in Sweden, referred to Armenians as "dogs" in a public speech in Stockholm, and added: "Turks awaken! Armenian scums must be finished, die Armenian scums, die, die!" (external link of speech (in Turkish)) Juridikfronten, a Swedish watchdog organization, filed a report to the police due to an "incitement to racial hatred". Thereafter, Leylani resigned from his post.

=== Incidents of violence against Armenians ===
Shortly after Hrant Dink was murdered, the assassin was honored as a hero while in police custody, posing with a Turkish flag with policemen.

Hrant Dink, the editor of the Agos weekly Armenian newspaper, was assassinated in Istanbul on January 19, 2007, by Ogün Samast. He was reportedly acting on the orders of Yasin Hayal, a militant Turkish ultra-nationalist. For his statements on Armenian identity and the Armenian genocide, Dink had been prosecuted three times under Article 301 of the Turkish Penal Code for "insulting Turkishness." He had also received numerous death threats from Turkish nationalists who viewed his "iconoclastic" journalism (particularly regarding the Armenian genocide) as an act of treachery.

İbrahim Şahin and 36 other alleged members of Turkish ultra-nationalist Ergenekon group were arrested in January, 2009 in Ankara. The Turkish police said the roundup was triggered by orders Şahin gave to assassinate 12 Armenian community leaders in Sivas. According to the official investigation in Turkey, Ergenekon also had a role in the murder of Hrant Dink.

Sevag Balıkcı, a Turkish soldier of Armenian descent, was shot dead on April 24, 2011, the day of the commemoration of the Armenian genocide during his military service in Batman. It was later discovered that killer Kıvanç Ağaoğlu was an ultra-nationalist. Through his Facebook profile, it was uncovered that he was a sympathizer of nationalist politician Muhsin Yazıcıoğlu and Turkish agent / contract killer Abdullah Çatlı, who himself had a history of anti-Armenian activity, such as the Armenian Genocide Memorial bombing in a Paris suburb in 1984. His Facebook profile also showed that he was a Great Union Party (BBP) sympathizer, a far-right nationalist party in Turkey. Testimony given by Sevag Balıkçı's fiancée stated that he was subjected to psychological pressure at the military compound. She was told by Sevag over the phone that he feared for his life because a certain military serviceman threatened him by saying, "If war were to happen with Armenia, you would be the first person I would kill."

On February 26, 2012, on the anniversary of the Khojaly Massacre, the Atsız Youth led a demonstration took place in Istanbul which contained hate speech and threats towards Armenia and Armenians. Chants and slogans during the demonstration include: "You are all Armenian, you are all bastards", "bastards of Hrant [Dink] can not scare us", and "Taksim Square today, Yerevan Tomorrow: We will descend upon you suddenly in the night."

In November, 2012 the ultra-nationalist ASIM-DER group (founded in 2002) had targeted Armenian schools, churches, foundations and individuals in Turkey as part of an anti-Armenian hate campaign.

On 23 February 2014, a group of protesters carrying a banner that said, "Long live the Ogun Samasts! Down with Hrant Dink!" paraded in front of an Armenian elementary school in Istanbul and then marched in front of the main building of the Agos newspaper, the same location where Hrant Dink was assassinated in 2007.

On 8 May 2020, an Armenian church in Istanbul was targeted by an arsonist who perceived a connection between Armenians and the spread of COVID-19.

=== Armenian genocide denial ===
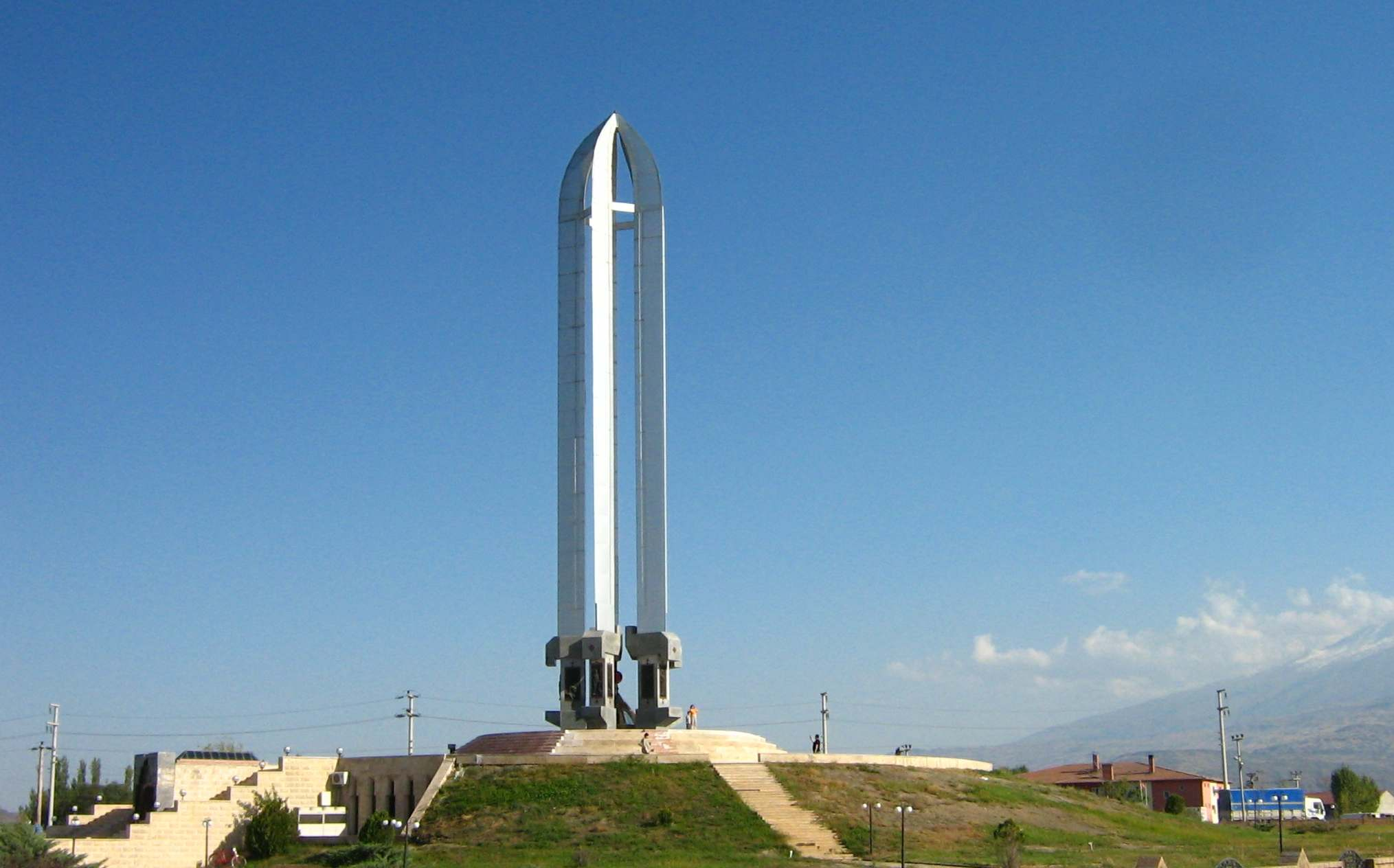
The Iğdır Genocide Memorial and Museum promotes the false view that Armenians committed genocide against Turks, rather than vice versa.

The Turkish government continues to aggressively deny the Armenian genocide. This position has been criticized in a letter from the International Association of Genocide Scholars to – then Turkish Prime Minister, now President – Recep Tayyip Erdoğan.

In 2004, Belge Films, the film's distributor in Turkey pulled the release of Atom Egoyan's Ararat film, about the Armenian genocide, after receiving threats from the Grey Wolves, an ultra nationalist organization. This organization was behind similar threat campaigns against the Armenian community in the past. In 1994, hate mail signed by the Grey Wolves was sent to Armenian owned businesses and private homes describing Armenians as 'parasites' and that the massacres of the past will resume. The letters also concluded by saying: "Do not forget: Turkey belongs only to the Turks. We will free Turkey of this exploitation. Don’t force us to send you to Yerevan! So leave now, before we do! Or else, it will boil down, as our Prime Minister (Tansu Çiller.) said, to: ‘either you put an end to it, or else we will.’ That is a final warning!"

On 20 February 2015, the Mayor of Bayburt Mete Memis called the deeds of Turkish soldiers who massacred Armenians a hundred years ago "heroism". He made a congratulatory statement on the 97th anniversary of Bayburt's sacking, in which its Armenian residents were massacred and exiled as part of the Armenian genocide, claiming that 97 years ago, the Turkish soldiers in Bayburt had "written their name in history for defending the homeland."

In August 2020 the statue of Komitas in Paris has been vandalized. The inscription "it is false" has been written in red ink on the plinth of the Armenian Genocide Memorial.

==== Education ====
In February 2015, banners celebrating the genocide were spotted in several cities throughout Turkey. They declared: "We celebrate the 100th anniversary of our country being cleansed of Armenians. We are proud of our glorious ancestors."

School textbooks in Turkey have been criticized for their negative depictions of Armenians and explicit denial of the Armenian Genocide and other Ottoman-era massacres.

Education in Turkey is centralized: its policy, administration and content are each determined by the Turkish government. Textbooks taught in schools are either prepared directly by the Ministry of National Education (MEB) or must be approved by its Instruction and Education Board. In practice, this means that the Turkish government is directly responsible for what textbooks are taught in all schools, even private education or those that are dedicated to ethnic minorities. The state uses this monopoly to promote the official position of Armenian Genocide denial.

In 2014, the historian Taner Akçam discussed the 2014–2015 Turkish elementary and middle school textbooks that the MEB had made available on the internet. He found that Turkish history textbooks are filled with the message that Armenians are people "who are incited by foreigners, who aim to break apart the state and the country, and who murdered Turks and Muslims." The Armenian Genocide is referred to as the "Armenian matter", and is described as a lie perpetrated to further the perceived hidden agenda of Armenians. Recognition of the Armenian Genocide is defined as the "biggest threat to Turkish national security".

Textbooks have also included demonization of Armenians, presenting them as enemies. Historian Tunç Aybak states, "These officially distributed educational material reconstruct the history in line with the denial policies of the government portraying the Armenians as the back stabbers and betrayers who are regarded as a threat to the sovereignty and identity of the modern Turkey. The racialization of the Armenian ‘problem’ has now become an integral part of the official denial strategy sponsored by the Turkish government and intellectuals of geopolitical state craft and sustained through the institutions of the Turkish state.

Armenian children who lack legal residency — including undocumented migrants or Syrian Armenian refugees — are allowed to enroll in Armenian schools but are ineligible for formal graduation certificates, a limitation that the European Centre for Law and Justice (ECLJ) states threatens the "continuity of Armenian identity."

=== Vandalism ===
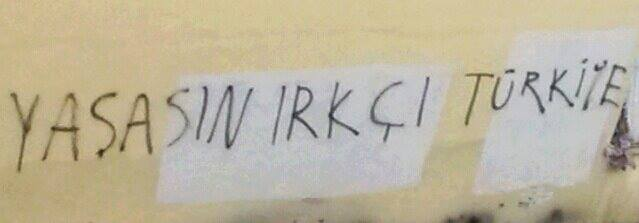
‘Long Live Racist Turkey’ spray-painted by unidentified people on the walls of an Armenian church in Istanbul

In 2002, a monument was erected in memory of Turkish-Armenian composer Onno Tunç in Yalova, Turkey. The monument to the composer of Armenian origin was subjected to much vandalism over the course of the years, in which unidentified people had taken out the letters on the monument. In 2012 Yalova Municipal Assembly decided to remove the monument. Bilgin Koçal, the former mayor of Yalova, informed the public that the memorial had been destroyed by time and that it would shortly be replaced with a new one in the memory of Tunç.

In February 2015, graffiti was discovered near the wall of an Armenian church in the Kadıköy district of Istanbul saying, "You’re Either Turkish or Bastards" and "You Are All Armenian, All Bastards". It is claimed that the graffiti was done by organizing members of a rally entitled "Demonstrations Condemning the Khojali Genocide and Armenian Terror." The Human Rights Association of Turkey petitioned the local government of Istanbul calling it a "Pretext to Incite Ethnic Hate Against Armenians in Turkey". In the same month banners celebrating the Armenian genocide were spotted in several cities throughout Turkey. They declared: "We celebrate the 100th anniversary of our country being cleansed of Armenians. We are proud of our glorious ancestors." (Yurdumuzun Ermenilerden temizlenişinin 100. yıldönümü kutlu olsun. Şanlı atalarımızla gurur duyuyoruz.)

The Armenian words of a 'Goodbye' (Ցտեսություն) sign vandalized in Iğdır, Turkey

In March 2015, graffiti was discovered on the walls of an Armenian church in the Bakırköy district of Istanbul which read "1915, blessed year", in reference to the Armenian genocide of 1915. Other slurs included "What does it matter if you are all Armenian when one of us is Ogün Samast," which was in reference to the slogan "We are all Armenian" used by demonstrators after the assassination of Hrant Dink. The administrator of the church remarked "This type of thing happens all the time."

In September 2015, a 'Welcome' sign was installed in Iğdır and written in four languages, Turkish, Kurdish, English, and Armenian. The Armenian portion of the sign was protested by ASIMDER who demanded its removal. In October 2015, the Armenian writing on the 'Welcome' sign was heavily vandalized. The Armenian portion of the sign was ultimately removed in June 2016.

In April 2018, a graffiti reading “This homeland is ours” was inscribed on the wall and a pile of trash was also dumped in front of the Armenian Surp Takavor Church in Kadıköy district. The Kadıköy municipality condemned and described the action as a “racist attack” in a Twitter post, saying the necessary work has been initiated to clear the writing and remove the trash.

=== Official statements ===
On 5 August 2014, then Prime Minister, now President of Turkey Recep Tayyip Erdoğan, in a televised interview on NTV news network, remarked that being Armenian is "uglier" even than being Georgian, saying "You wouldn't believe the things they have said about me. They have said I am Georgian ... they have said even uglier things - they have called me Armenian, but I am Turkish."

On 3 June 2015, during an election campaign speech in Bingöl directed against opposition party HDP, President Recep Tayyip Erdoğan stated that the "Armenian lobby, homosexuals and those who believe in 'Alevism without Ali' – all these representatives of sedition are [the HDP’s] benefactors."

On 24 June 2015, after a concert by Tigran Hamasyan in Ani, a ruined medieval Armenian city-site situated in the Turkish province of Kars, the president of the Grey Wolves of the Kars district, Tolga Adıgüzel, threatened to 'hunt down' Armenians in the streets of Kars.

After the June 2015 Turkish general election, when three Armenian MPs were elected to the Grand National Assembly, Hüseyin Sözlü, the mayor of Adana, reacted in a Twitter post: "Manukyan's nephew in Adana must be very happy now. His three cousins have entered the Parliament. They are from the AKP, the CHP and the HDP." Sözlü alluded that the three Armenian MPs were related to Matild Manukyan, a Turkish-Armenian businesswoman who is known to have owned several brothels.

=== Media ===
The Ankara Chamber of Commerce included a documentary, accusing the Armenian people of slaughtering Turks, with its paid tourism advertisements in the June 6, 2005 edition of the magazine Time Europe. The magazine later apologized for allowing the inclusion of the DVDs and published a critical letter signed by five French organizations. The February 12, 2007, edition of Time Europe included an acknowledgment of the truth of the Armenian genocide and a DVD of a documentary by French director Laurence Jourdan about the genocide.

=== Influence on Turkish national identity ===
The Armenian genocide itself played a key role in the destruction of the Ottoman Empire and the foundation of the Turkish republic. From the founding of the republic, the genocide has been viewed as a necessity and raison d'état. Many of the main perpetrators, including Talaat Pasha, were hailed as national heroes of Turkey; many schools, streets, and mosques are still named after them. Historian Erik-Jan Zürcher argues that, since the Turkish nationalist movement dependent on the support of a broad coalition of actors that benefited from the genocide, it was impossible to break with the past. Turkish historian Doğan Gürpınar says that acknowledging the genocide would bring into question the foundational assumptions of the Turkish nation-state.

The mass confiscation of Armenian properties was an important factor in forming the economic basis of the Turkish Republic while endowing the Turkish economy with capital. The appropriation led to the formation of a new Turkish bourgeoisie and provided the opportunity for lower class Turks (peasantry, soldiers, and laborers) to rise to the ranks of the middle class. Turkish historian Uğur Ümit Üngör asserts that "the elimination of the Armenian population left the state an infrastructure of Armenian property, which was used for the progress of Turkish (settler) communities. In other words: the construction of an étatist Turkish "national economy" was unthinkable without the destruction and expropriation of Armenians."

Turkish nationalists have taken to trials people like the Nobel Prize–winning Turkish novelist Orhan Pamuk, the Turkish novelist Elif Shafak, and the late Hrant Dink for acknowledging the existence of the Armenian genocide, accusing them of insulting Turkey.

== See also ==
- Anti-Armenian sentiment
- Anti-Armenian sentiment in Azerbaijan
- Armenia–Turkey relations
- Armenian genocide
- Armenian genocide denial
- Armenian genocide recognition
  - Armenian genocide recognition § Position of Turkey
- Armenian question
- Armenians in the Ottoman Empire
- Armenians in Turkey
- Confiscation of Armenian properties in Turkey
- Destroyed Armenian churches in Turkey
- Hidden Armenians
- Neo-Ottomanism
- Racism and discrimination in Turkey
- Terminology of the Armenian genocide
- Turkish nationalism
- Turkish textbook controversies
