= Anti-Armenian sentiment =

Strong aversion and prejudice against Armenians

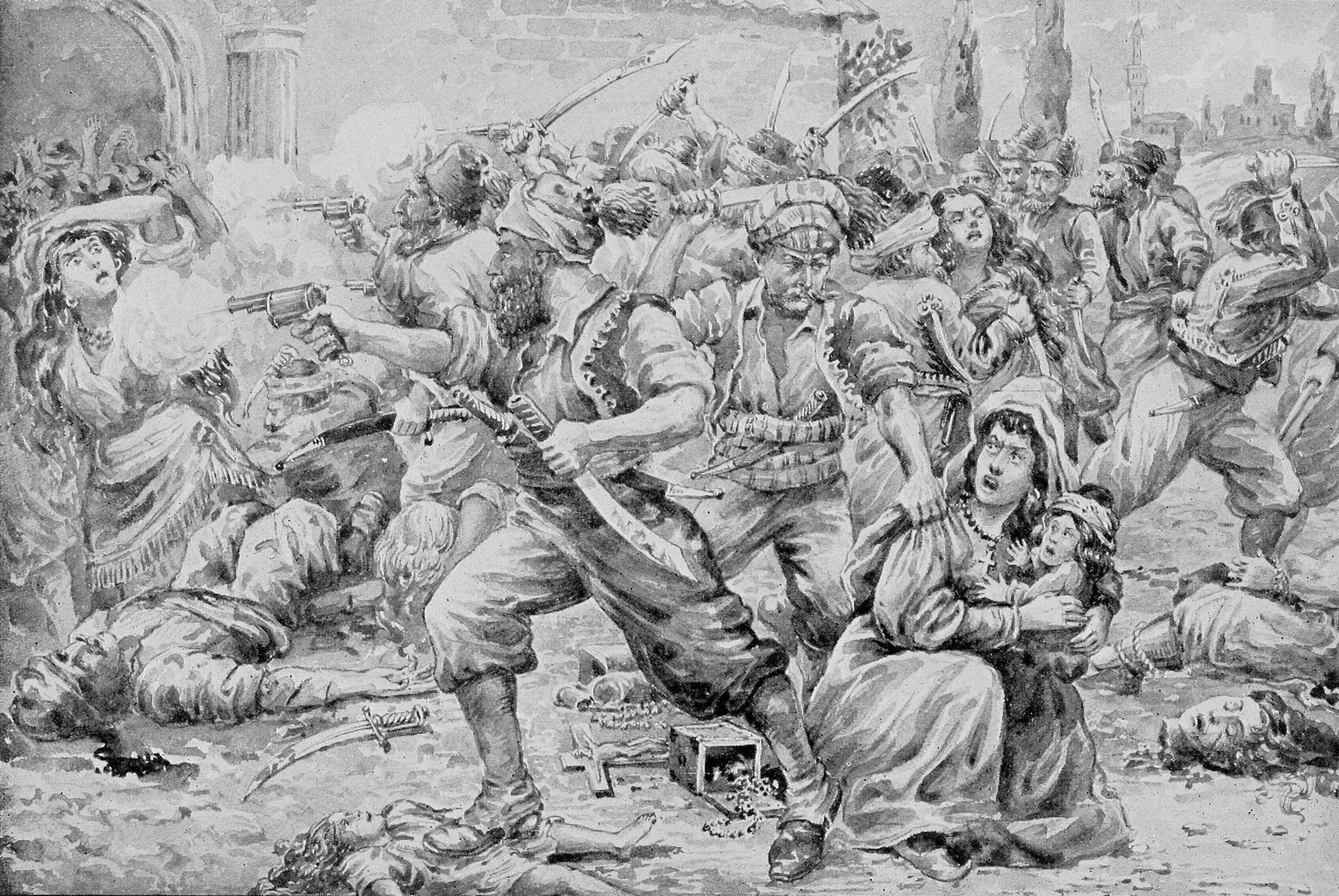
Sketch by an eyewitness of the massacre of Armenians in Sasun in 1894

Anti-Armenian sentiment, also known as anti-Armenianism and Armenophobia, encompasses a wide-ranging spectrum of hostile attitudes and expressions of negative feelings (e.g., fear, aversion, derision, suspiciousness, dislike, etc.), as well as overt chauvinism and xenophobia, harmful stereotypes, and/or prejudice towards Armenians, Armenia, and Armenian culture.

Historically, anti-Armenianism has manifested itself in several ways, ranging from expressions of hatred or of discrimination against individuals of Armenian ethnic background to organized pogroms by mobs or state-sanctioned genocide. Historically, the most destructive and lethal instances of Armenophobia include the Hamidian massacres (1894–1897), the Adana massacre (1909), the Armenian genocide (1915), the Sumgait pogrom (1988), and Operation Ring (1991).

Modern anti-Armenianism frequently consists of expressions of opposition to the actions or existence of an Armenian state, implicit or explicit denial of the Armenian genocide, or belief in an Armenian conspiracy to fabricate history and manipulate public and political opinion for political gain. Anti-Armenianism has also manifested as extrajudicial killing or intimidation of people of Armenian heritage and destruction of cultural monuments.

== Turkey ==
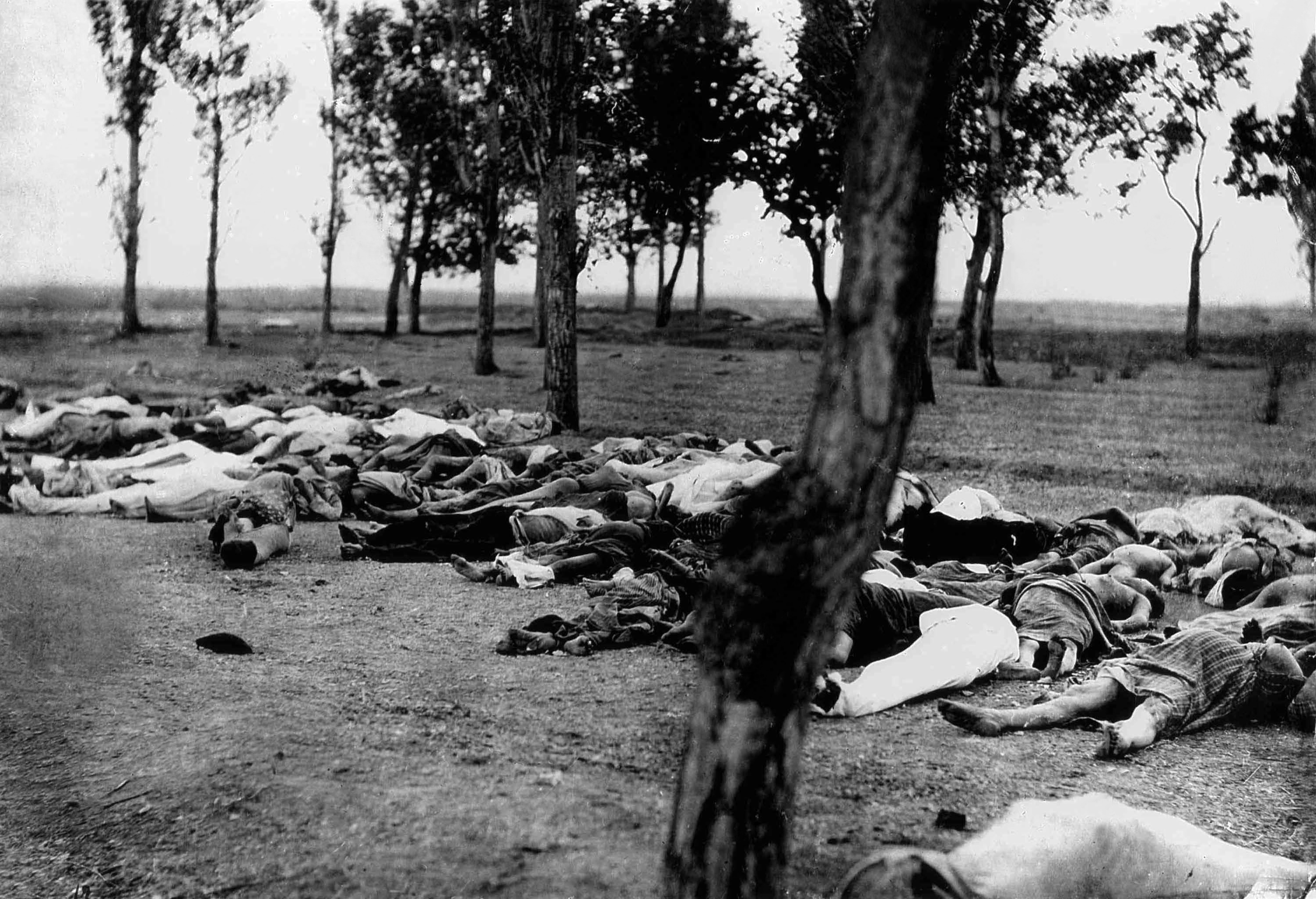
Of this photo, the United States ambassador wrote, "Scenes like this were common throughout the Armenian provinces, in the spring and summer months of 1915. Death in its several forms—massacre, starvation, exhaustion—destroyed the larger part of the refugees. The Turkish policy was that of extermination under the guise of deportation."

=== Armenian genocide and its denial ===
Although in the time of the Ottoman Empire's occupation of historically Armenian lands (alongside other territories throughout Africa, Asia, and Europe), Armenians who lived across the empire's territory were, in practice, able to achieve relatively high social status and significant personal wealth as members of the community, they were never considered de jure equal to the majority Turkish citizens, having their social status limited to "second-class citizens," including being regarded as fundamentally alien to the predominantly Muslim (Turkish) character of Ottoman society. In 1895, several revolts among the Armenian subjects of the Ottoman Empire in pursuit of equal treatment led to Sultan Abdül Hamid deciding to respond by indiscriminately targeting the empire's Armenian population, which eventually resulted in the notorious Hamidian massacres, during which between 100,000 and 300,000 Armenians were murdered.

During and after World War I, the Ottoman government, led by the CUP triumvirate, perpetrated a massacre of between 1.2 and 1.8 million Armenians, in one of the greatest atrocities in history, known as Armenian genocide. The Turkish government continues to aggressively deny the Armenian genocide. This position has been criticized in a letter from the International Association of Genocide Scholars to – then Turkish Prime Minister, now President – Recep Tayyip Erdoğan.

==== Contemporary ====
Cenk Saraçoğlu argues that anti-Armenian attitudes in Turkey "are no longer constructed and shaped by social interactions between the 'ordinary people' ... Rather, the Turkish media and state promote and disseminate an overtly anti-Armenian discourse." According to a 2011 survey in Turkey, 73.9% of respondents admitted having unfavorable views toward Armenians. The survey showed an unfavorable stance toward Armenians was "relatively more widespread among those participants with lower levels of education and socioeconomic status." According to Minority Rights Group, while the government recognizes Armenians as a minority group, as used in Turkey, this term denotes second-class status.

The new generations are being taught to see Armenians not as human, but [as] an entity to be despised and destroyed, the worst enemy. And the school curriculum adds fuel to the existing fires.

— Turkish lawyer Fethiye Çetin

Shortly after Hrant Dink was murdered, the assassin was honored as a hero while in police custody, posing with a Turkish flag with policemen.

Hrant Dink, the editor of the weekly bilingual newspaper Agos, was assassinated in Istanbul on January 19, 2007, by Ogün Samast, who was reportedly acting on the orders of Yasin Hayal, a militant Turkish ultra-nationalist. For his statements on Armenian identity and the Armenian genocide, Dink had been prosecuted three times under Article 301 of the Turkish Penal Code for "insulting Turkishness." (The law was later amended by the Turkish parliament, changing "Turkishness" to "Turkish Nation" and making it more difficult to prosecute individuals for the said offense.) Dink had also received numerous death threats from Turkish nationalists who viewed his "iconoclastic" journalism (particularly regarding the Armenian genocide) as an act of treachery.

İbrahim Şahin and 36 other alleged members of the Turkish ultra-nationalist Ergenekon group were arrested in January 2009 in Ankara. The Turkish police said the roundup was triggered by orders Şahin gave to assassinate 12 Armenian community leaders in Sivas. According to the official investigation in Turkey, Ergenekon also had a role in the murder of Hrant Dink.

In 2002, a monument was erected in memory of Turkish-Armenian composer Onno Tunç in Yalova, Turkey. The monument to the composer of Armenian origin was subjected to much vandalism over the course of the years, in which unidentified people had taken out the letters on the monument. In 2012, the Yalova Municipal Assembly decided to remove the monument. Bilgin Koçal, the former mayor of Yalova, informed the public that the memorial had been destroyed by time and that it would shortly be replaced with a new one in the memory of Tunç. On the other hand, a similar memorial stays in place at the village of Selimiye, where an aircraft had crashed; and the people in the village of 187 expressed their protest about the vandalism claims regarding the memorial in Yalova, adding that they paid from their own funds to keep up the maintenance of the monument in their village against the wearing effect of natural causes.

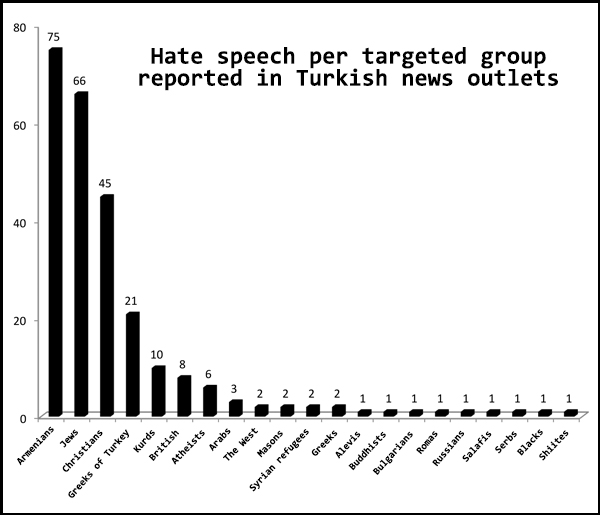
Accounts of hate speech towards targeted groups in Turkish news outlets with Armenians shown as being targeted the most according to a January–April 2014 Media Watch on Hate Speech and Discriminatory Language Report

Sevag Balikci, a Turkish soldier of Armenian descent, was shot dead on April 24, 2011, the day of the commemoration of the Armenian genocide, while serving in the military in Batman. It was later discovered that killer Kıvanç Ağaoğlu was an ultra-nationalist. Through his Facebook profile, it was uncovered that he was a sympathizer of nationalist politician Muhsin Yazıcıoğlu and Turkish agent/contract killer Abdullah Çatlı, who himself had a history of anti-Armenian activity, such as the Armenian Genocide Memorial bombing in a Paris suburb in 1984. Furthermore, his Facebook profile also showed that he was a Great Union Party (BBP) sympathizer, a far-right nationalist party in Turkey. Testimony given by Sevag Balıkçı's fiancée stated that he was subjected to psychological pressure at the military compound. She was told by Sevag over the phone that he feared for his life because a certain military serviceman threatened him by saying, "If war were to happen with Armenia, you would be the first person I would kill."

On February 26, 2012, on the anniversary of the Khojaly Massacre, the Atsız Youth led a demonstration in Istanbul that contained hate speech and threats towards Armenia and Armenians. Chants and slogans during the demonstration include: "You are all Armenian, you are all bastards", "bastards of Hrant [Dink] can not scare us", and "Taksim Square today, Yerevan Tomorrow: We will descend upon you suddenly in the night."

In 2012, the ultra-nationalist ASIM-DER group (founded in 2002) had targeted Armenian schools, churches, foundations, and individuals in Turkey as part of an anti-Armenian hate campaign.

== Azerbaijan ==
Anti-Armenian sentiment is widespread in Azerbaijan. Observers and human rights bodies describe Armenians as the most vulnerable ethnic group in the country, noting widespread negative stereotyping in public discourse. Polling over the past decades has shown deep animosity toward Armenia, and the term "Armenian" (erməni) is widely used as an insult in everyday language and media.

Historical roots trace back to anti-Armenian sentiment in Turkey, pan-Turkism, the actions of Russian and Soviet authorities, and the higher economic and social status of Armenians compared to Azeris at the turn of the 20th century. Contemporary Armenophobia in Azerbaijan traces its roots to the Karabakh Movement, in which Armenians petitioned Soviet authorities to transfer the mostly Armenian-populated Nagorno-Karabakh Autonomous Oblast (NKAO) in Azerbaijan to Armenia. In response, anti-Armenian pogroms occurred in Sumgait, Kirovabad and Baku. From 1988 through 1992, an estimated 300,000–350,000 Armenians were either deported from or fled Azerbaijan under threat of violence — primarily from areas outside Nagorno-Karabakh, where the Armenian population was largely spared. The conflict eventually escalated into the First Nagorno-Karabakh War, in which Azerbaijan lost control over the territory to the self-proclaimed Nagorno-Karabakh (Artsakh) Republic, further magnifying anti-Armenian sentiment.

Since its independence from the Soviet Union, the Azerbaijani government has institutionalized anti-Armenian attitudes through school curricula, state media, historical negationism, and the erasure or appropriation of Armenian cultural heritage. Government officials and prominent figures within Azerbaijan routinely engage in hate speech against Armenians, using dehumanizing language and promoting negative caricatures of Armenians. Human rights organizations and others have documented various anti-Armenian conduct within Azerbaijan including restrictions on Armenian identity and right of return, torture, extrajudicial killings, and sexual violence. State-sponsored symbols such as the military trophy park in Baku and postage stamps reinforce dehumanizing narratives.

Anti-Armenian sentiment is cited as a genocide risk factor and contributed to the forcible expulsion of all Armenians from Nagorno-Karabakh (Artsakh). The Armenians that remain in Azerbaijan face a deeply marginalized existence, conceal their identities, and are sometimes described as "second-class citizens."

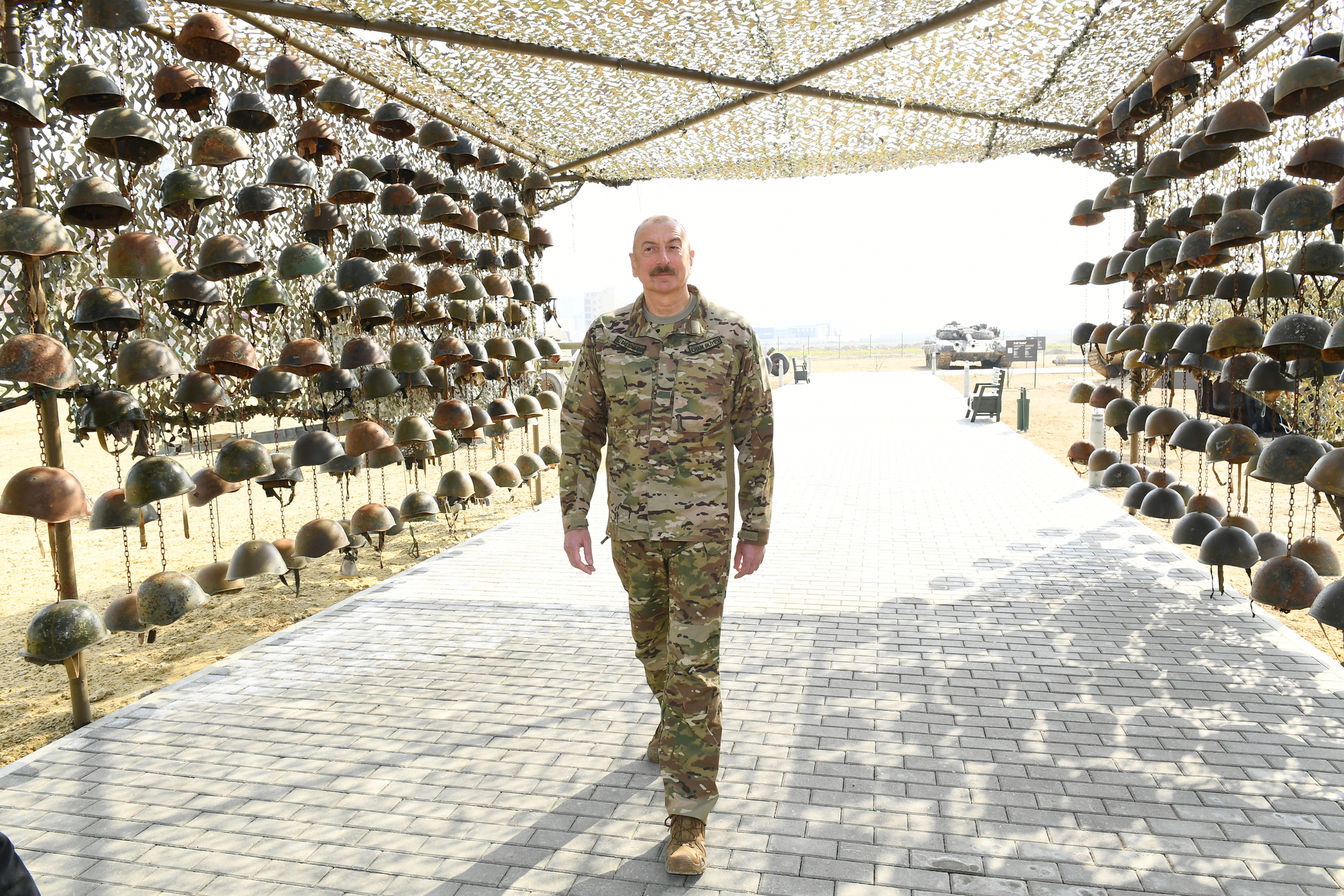
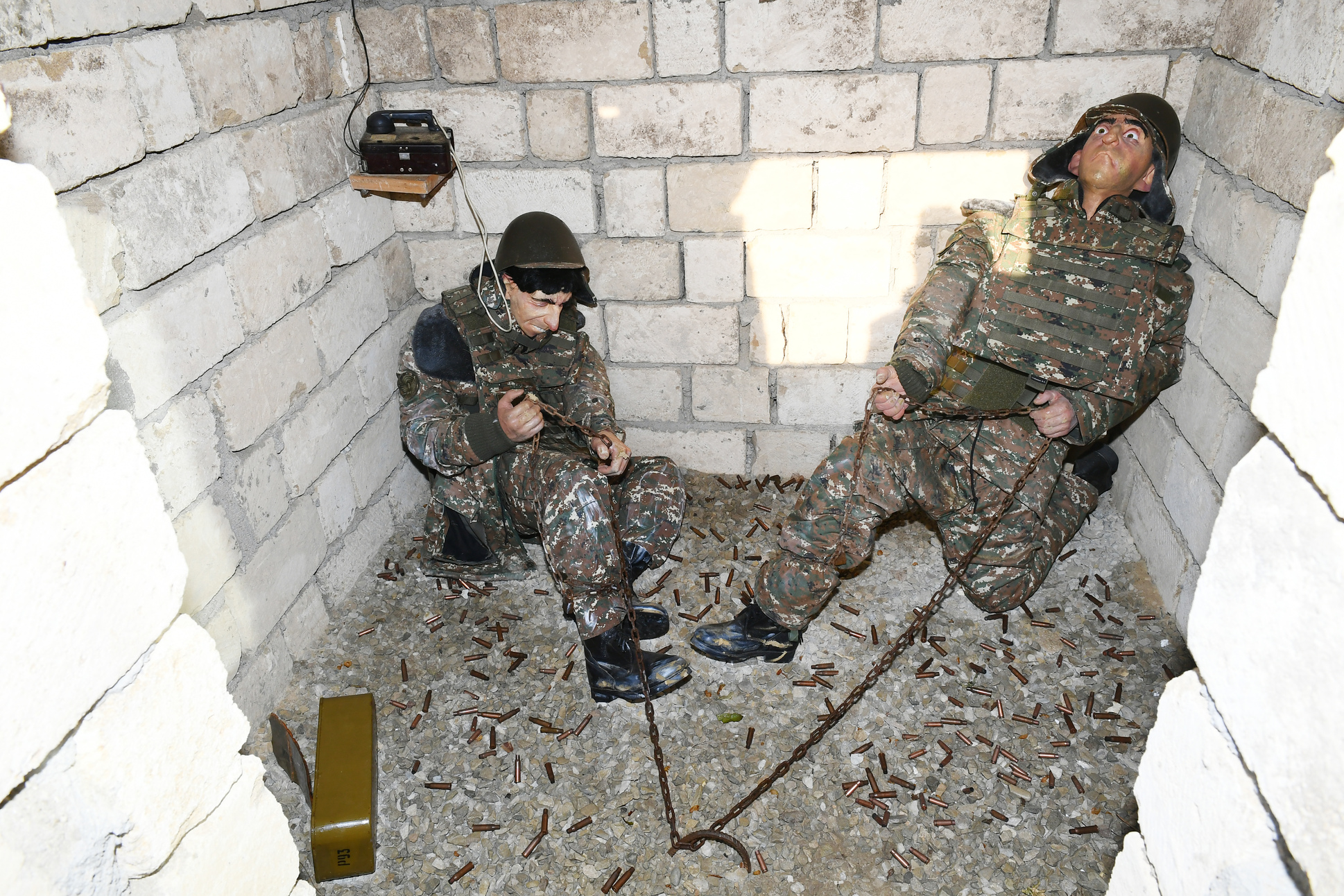
Helmets of deceased Armenian troops, wax mannequins of captured Armenian soldiers of the Second Nagorno-Karabakh War showcased at Baku military park in Azerbaijan. President Ilham Aliyev shown in the first image during a visit to the park.

=== Status of Armenian cultural monuments ===
In November 2020, the British newspaper The Guardian wrote about Azerbaijan's campaign of comprehensive "cultural cleansing" in Nakhichevan:

Satellite imagery, extensive documentary evidence, and personal accounts showed that 89 churches, 5,840 khachkars, and 22,000 tombstones were destroyed between 1997 and 2006, including the medieval necropolis of Djulfa, the largest ancient Armenian cemetery in the world. The Azerbaijani response has consistently been to simply deny that Armenians had ever lived in the region.

The most publicized case of mass destruction concerns gravestones at a medieval Armenian cemetery in Julfa, a sacred site of the Armenian Apostolic Church. Charles Tannock, the member of the foreign affairs committee of the European Parliament, argued: "This is very similar to the Buddha statues destroyed by the Taliban. They have concreted the area over and turned it into a military camp." The destruction of the cemetery has been widely described by Armenian sources, and some non-Armenian sources, as an act of cultural genocide.

European Parliament published a resolution on 10 March 2022, condemning the destruction of the Armenian heritage in Artsakh (Nagorno-Karabakh). The resolution read:

European Parliament ... Strongly condemns Azerbaijan's continued policy of erasing and denying the Armenian cultural heritage in and around Nagorno-Karabakh, in violation of international law and the recent decision of the ICJ...

=== Ongoing genocide risk ===
Since 2020, Azerbaijan has attacked Armenian positions in Nagorno-Karabakh/Artsakh (Second Nagorno-Karabakh War), Armenia (border crisis), and has also imposed a blockade on the Republic of Artsakh. These events have resulted in numerous organizations, including those which specialize in genocide studies, reporting that Armenians are at risk of being subjected to another genocide. The Lemkin Institute for Genocide Prevention considers Armenians to be "one of the most threatened identities in the world today." Sheila Paylan, international criminal lawyer and legal advisor to the United Nations has warned that "The international community should take its R2P [Responsibility to Protect] commitments more seriously or risk becoming silently complicit in the next Armenian genocide—or ethnic cleansing." Caucasus expert Laurence Broers draws parallels between "the Russian discourse about Ukraine as an artificial, fake nation, and the Azerbaijani discourse about Armenia, likewise claiming it has a fake history", thereby elevating the conflict to an "existential level" for Armenians. A coalition of various human rights organizations also issued a collective genocide warning in response to the blockade: "All 14 risk factors for atrocity crimes identified by the UN Secretary-General's Office on Genocide Prevention are now present."

- The Lemkin Institute for Genocide Prevention – Since 2021, the organization has issued various "Red Flag Alerts" on Azerbaijan which the organization says poses a threat of genocide to Armenians. It described the Azerbaijan's blockade of the Republic of Artsakh as "a criminal act which intends to create terror and unbearable conditions of life for the population of Artsakh. These events are not isolated events; they are, instead, being committed within a larger genocidal pattern against Armenia and Armenians by the Azerbaijani regime." The group also wrote "The genocidal intent of Baku has never been clearer and the actions carried out up to the moment highly predict this outcome."
- Genocide Watch – issued its own genocide warnings in September 2020 saying that "Because of Azerbaijan’s invasion of Artsakh...Genocide Watch considers Azerbaijan to be at Stage 9: Extermination and at Stage 10: Denial. Genocide Watch considers that Azerbaijan's leadership may intend to forcibly deport the Armenian population of Artsakh by committing genocidal massacres that will terrorize Armenians into leaving Artsakh." In September 2022, Genocide Watch issued another alert stating, "Due to its unprovoked attacks and genocidal rhetoric against ethnic Armenians, Genocide Watch considers Azerbaijan's assault on Armenia and Artsakh to be at Stage 4: Dehumanization, Stage 7: Preparation, Stage 8: Persecution, and Stage 10: Denial." The group wrote a letter to the EU council, warning that the European Union "is turning a blind eye to the Azerbaijani dictatorship for geopolitical and resource reasons" and that Azerbaijan's "intentions are clear: to wipe out all traces of Armenian life and of an Armenian presence in this region. Azerbaijani President, Ilham Aliyev, has consistently and repeatedly stated that he intends to eradicate the indigenous Armenians dwelling in Artsakh."
- The International Association of Genocide Scholars (IAGS) – issued similar statements in October 2020: "Direct Turkish involvement in the decades-long [Nagorno-Karabakh] conflict is ... a fact that threatens to annihilate Armenians in Artsakh and beyond. A recent statement issued by the Turkish president, Recep Tayyip Erdogan, read that they, Turkey, were going 'to continue to fulfill the mission of their grandfathers, which was carried out a century ago in the Caucasus'. This constitutes a direct threat of continuing the Armenian genocide that began in 1915...History, from the Armenian genocide to the last three decades of conflict, as well as current political statements, economic policies, sentiments of the societies and military actions by the Azerbaijani and Turkish leadership should warn us that genocide of the Armenians in Nagorno-Karabakh, and perhaps even Armenia, is a very real possibility." In October 2022, the IAGS issued another statement condemning Azerbaijan's September 2022 attacks on the Republic of Armenia: "Significant genocide risk factors exist in the Nagorno-Karabakh situation concerning the Armenian population" and "dehumanizing and other [irredentist] statements [from Azerbaijani government officials] demonstrate the existence of a risk of genocide, and may amount to incitement to genocide and possibly other international crimes."

== Iran ==
Despite the supposed claims of protections given to Armenians in Iran, hate speech against Armenians (and Christians) has been found among far-right internet circles, with Armenians being referred to as “dogs”, in addition to significant anti-Armenian sentiment among Iranians in the country and the diaspora (amongst Muslims and non Muslims alike). Hate crimes against and detainment of Armenian Christians also have occurred, mostly against Armenian Christians evangelizing the populace (mostly underground ethnic Iranian and Turkic Christian converts), a notable example being Haik Hovsepian Mehr. In addition, the government was discovered to have murdered several Armenian protestors in Iran (all Christian) during crackdowns attacking Iranian protestors.

== Russia ==
A 19th-century Russian explorer, Vasili Lvovich Velichko, who was active during the period when the Russian tsarism carried out a purposeful anti-Armenian policy, wrote "Armenians are the extreme instance of brachycephaly; their actual racial instinct make them naturally hostile to the State."

According to a 2012 VTSIOM opinion research, 6% of respondents in Moscow and 3% in Saint Petersburg were "experiencing feelings of irritation, hostility" toward Armenians. In the 2000s, there were racist murders of Armenians in Russia. In 2002, an explosion took place in Krasnodar near the Armenian church which the local community believed was a terrorist act.

== Georgia ==
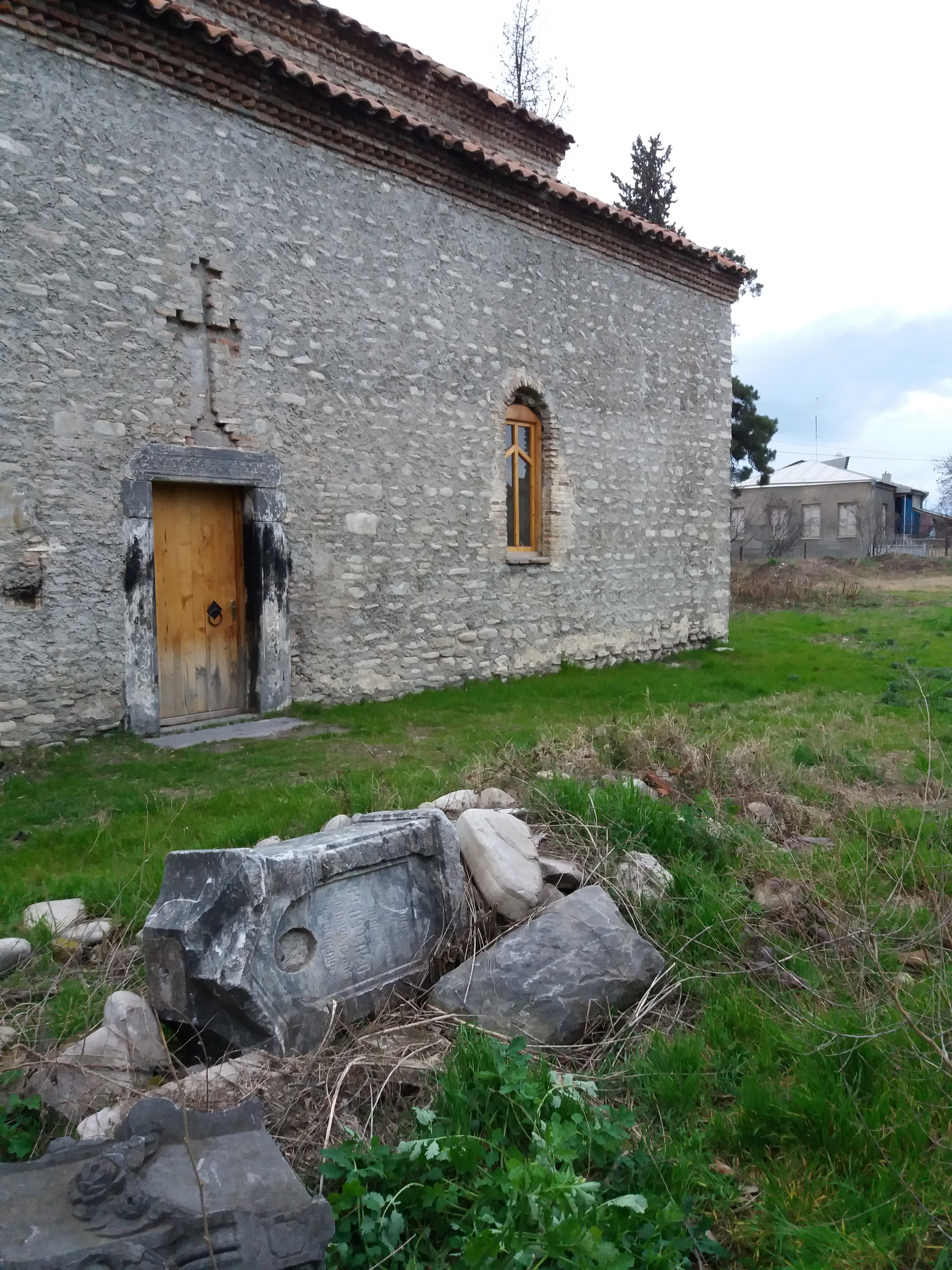
Unrooted Armenian gravestones in a church yard in Velistsikhe, Kakheti, Georgia

In Georgia, Armenians are often stereotyped as greedy or dishonest, and public figures, including politicians, have frequently faced accusations of hiding their Armenian background. Georgian philosopher Giorgi Maisuradze stated that Armenophobia is "the oldest form of xenophobia in Georgia."

In the late 19th century and early 20th century, anti-Armenian sentiment was prevalent in both socialist and nationalist Georgian circles. The economic dominance of Armenians in Tbilisi fueled verbal attacks on Armenians. Droeba, an influential journal, described Armenians as people who "strip our streets and fatten their pockets" and "but the last piece of property from our indebted peasant families." Both Ilia Chavchavadze and Akaki Tsereteli, two major literary figures, attacked Armenians for their perceived mercantilism. Tsereteli portrayed Armenians as a flea sucking Georgian blood in one fable. Chavchavadze denounced Armenians for "eating the bread baked by someone else or drinking that which is creating by another's sweat." Chavchavadze's newspaper, Iveria, depicted Armenians as "sly moneylenders and unscrupulous traders", according to Stephen F. Jones. The Social Democratic Party of Georgia (Georgian Mensheviks) attacked the bourgeoisie and imperialism to liberate Georgia from both Russian imperialism and perceived Armenian economic exploitation. During the existence of the Democratic Republic of Georgia (1918–21), the independent Georgian government saw Armenians as a potential "fifth column" for their supposed loyalty to the First Republic of Armenia and subject to manipulation by foreign powers. The Georgian–Armenian War of December 1918 increased anti-Armenian sentiments in Georgia.

Joseph Stalin wrote in his 1913 essay Marxism and the National Question:

What exists in Georgia is anti-Armenian nationalism but this is because there is an Armenian big bourgeoisie which, by crushing the small and as yet weak Georgian bourgeoisie, thrusts the latter towards anti-Armenian nationalism.

In post-Soviet Georgia, the government has engaged in cultural cleansing against its Armenian population through state-backed closure of Armenian cultural centers and schools, enforced Kartvelization (forced usage of the Georgian language) of churches, pressured name changes, propaganda portraying Armenians as outsiders, and economic suppression of Armenian-populated regions. The first president Zviad Gamsakhurdia, an outspoken nationalist, viewed Armenians, along with other ethnic minorities, as "guests" or "aliens" who threaten Georgia's territorial integrity.

Around the time of the 2007 parliamentary elections in the breakaway region of Abkhazia, the Georgian media emphasized the factor of ethnic Armenians in the area. The Georgian newspaper Sakartvelos Respublika predicted that much of the parliament would be Armenian and that there was even a chance of an Armenian president being elected. The paper also reported that the Abkhazian republic might already be receiving financial assistance from Armenians living in the United States. Some Armenian analysts believe such reports are attempting to create conflict between Armenians and ethnic Abkhazians to destabilize the region.

A policy of desecration of Armenian churches and historical monuments on the territory of Georgia has actively been pursued. On November 16, 2008, Georgian monk Tariel Sikinchelashvili vandalised the graves of patrons of art Mikhail and Lidia Tamamshev. The Armenian Church of Norashen in Tbilisi, built in the middle of the 15th century, has been desecrated and misappropriated by the Georgian government despite the fact that both Armenia's and Georgia's Prime-Ministers have reached an agreement on not to maltreat the church. Due to no law on religion, the status of Surb Norashen, Surb Nshan, Shamhoretsor Surb Astvatsatsin (Karmir Avetaran), Yerevanots Surb Minas and Mugni Surb Gevorg in Tbilisi and Surb Nshan in Akhaltsikhe is unknown since being confiscated during the Soviet era. Armenians in Georgia and Armenia have demonstrated against the destruction. On November 28, 2008, Armenian demonstrators in front of the Georgian embassy in Armenia demanded that the Georgian government immediately cease encroachments on the Armenian churches and punish those guilty, calling the Georgian party's actions "white genocide".

In 2011, Georgia's Culture Minister Nika Rurua sacked director Robert Sturua as head of the Tbilisi national theatre for "xenophobic" comments he made earlier this year, officials reported. "We are not going to finance xenophobia. Georgia is a multicultural country", Rurua said. Provoking public outrage, Sturua said in an interview with local news agency that "Saakashvili doesn't know what Georgian people need because he is Armenian." "I do not want Georgia to be governed by a representative of a different ethnicity", he added.

In 2014, the Armenian Ejmiatsin Church in Tbilisi was attacked. The Armenian diocese said it was "a crime committed on ethnic and religious grounds."

In 2018, the Tandoyants Armenian church in Tbilisi was gifted to the Georgian Orthodox Patriarchate. The Diocese of the Armenian Apostolic Holy Orthodox Church in Georgia stated that the church was "illegally transferred" to the Georgian Patriarchate. According to the Human Rights Education and Monitoring Center, Tandoyants is not the only historic Armenian church the Georgian Patriarchate has targeted. There are at least six others the Patriarchate has its sights set on.

== United States ==
=== Early 20th century ===
There has been historic prejudice against Armenians in the United States throughout various times, at least beginning from the early 1900s.

In early 1900s, Armenians were among the group of minorities who were barred from loaning money, land, and equipment particularly because of their race. They were referred to as "lower class Jews". Moreover, in Fresno, California, among other minorities Armenians lived on one side of Van Ness Blvd., while the residents of European white origin lived on the other side. A deed from one home there stated, "Neither said premises nor any part thereof shall be used in any matter whatsoever or occupied by any Black, Chinese, Japanese, Hindu, Armenian, Asiatic or native of the Turkish Empire."

Between the 1920s and the 1960s, some houses in the Rock Creek Hills neighborhood of Kensington, Maryland, a suburb of Washington, D.C., included anti-Armenian language in racial covenants that were part of property deeds. One deed in Rock Creek Hills declared that homes in the neighborhood "shall never be used or occupied by...negroes or any person or persons, of negro blood or extraction, or to any person of the Semitic Race, blood or origin, or Jews, Armenians, Hebrews, Persians and Syrians, except...partial occupancy of the premises by domestic servants."

In Anny Bakalian's book Armenian-Americans: From Being to Feeling Armenian, various groups of Armenians were polled for discrimination based on their identity. Roughly 77% of US-born Armenians felt they were discriminated in getting a job while 80% responded positively to a question whether they felt discriminated in getting admitted to a school.

American historian Justin McCarthy is known for his controversial view that no genocide was intended by the Ottoman Empire but that both Armenians and Turks died as the result of civil war. Some attribute his denial of the Armenian genocide to anti-Armenianism, as he holds an honorary doctorate of the Turkish Boğaziçi University and he is also a board member of the Institute of Turkish Studies.

=== Since the 1990s ===
On April 24, 1998, during a campus exhibit organized by the Armenian Students' Association at UC Berkeley, Hamid Algar, a professor of Islamic & Persian Studies, reportedly approached a group of organizers and shouted, "It was not a genocide but I wish it was—you lying pigs!" The students also claimed that Algar also spat at them. Following the incident members of the Armenian Students' Association filed a report with campus police calling for an investigation. After a five-month investigation the Chancellor's office issued an apology, though no hate charges were filed as incident did not create a "hostile environment". On March 10, 1999, the Associated Students of University of California (ASUC) passed a resolution titled, "A Bill Against Hate Speech and in Support of Reprimand for Prof. Algar", condemning the incident and calling for Chancellor to review the university decision not to file charges.

In 1999, after Rafi Manoukian got elected to Glendale City Council, one resident attended the council's meetings every week to "tell Armenians to go back where they came from." Manoukian campaign had made a point to galvanize Glendale's large Armenian American electorate.

In April 2007, the Los Angeles Times Managing Editor Douglas Frantz blocked a story on the Armenian genocide written by Mark Arax, allegedly citing the fact Arax was of Armenian descent and therefore had a biased opinion on the subject. Arax, who has published similar articles before, has lodged a discrimination complaint and threatened a federal lawsuit. Frantz, who did not cite any specific factual errors in the article, is accused of having a bias obtained while being stationed in Istanbul, Turkey. Harut Sassounian, an Armenian community leader, accused Frantz of having expressed support for denial of the Armenian genocide and has stated he personally believed that Armenians rebelled against the Ottoman Empire, an argument commonly used to justify the killings. Frantz resigned from the paper not long afterward, possibly due to the mounting requests for his dismissal from the Armenian community.

In March 2012, three of five Glendale Police Department's officers of Armenian origin filed a lawsuit in Los Angeles County Superior Court against Glendale Police Department claiming racial discrimination.

Another incident that received less coverage was a series of hate mail campaigns directed at Paul Krekorian, a city council candidate for Californian Democratic Primary, making racist remarks and accusations that the Armenian community was engaging in voter fraud.

In 2016, during a race between Glendale City Clerk Ardy Kassakhian and Glendale Council Member Laura Friedman for the 43rd District Assembly seat, Kassakhian's campaign faced numerous threats and criticism based on the candidate's ethnicity. At one point in the campaign Kassakhian's office was evacuated after receiving a phone call that threatened the safety of employees and volunteers.

On April 20, 2016, Armenian genocide denial propaganda appeared in the sky over the Hudson River between Manhattan and Northern New Jersey. The skywriting featured messages such as "101 years of Geno-lie", "BFF = Russia + Armenia", and "FactCheckArmenia.com". The aerial stunt was part of a campaign by the website Fact Check Armenia, an Armenian genocide denialist site. The writing could be seen from roughly a 15-mile (24 km) radius. The media attention from the incident resulted in an official apology by the skywriting company.

In the 4th episode of Season 3 of the CBS sitcom 2 Broke Girls (aired on October 14, 2013) "when a new cappuccino maker is brought into the cupcake store by a co-worker, he says he bought it for a cheap price from a person who stole it but sells it at a profit, adding 'it's the Armenian way.' When the character is pressed that he is not Armenian, he says 'I know. But, it's the Armenian way.'" This scene was characterized as "racist" by Asbarez Editor Ara Khachatourian, who criticized CBS for promotion of racial stereotypes in their shows.

In the January 9, 2018, episode of the Comedy Central late-night program The Daily Show Trevor Noah stated: "This is, like, really funny. Only Donald Trump could defend himself and, in the same sentence, completely undermine his whole point. It would be like someone saying, 'I'm the most tolerant guy out there, just ask this filthy Armenian.'" Armenian American organizations criticized Noah for alleged racism against Armenians. In a joint press release the Armenian Bar Association and the Armenian Rights Watch Committee (ARWC) compared "Filthy Armenians" to other offensive racial epithets, which although "may have been intended to coax a laugh from the audience by ridiculing President Trump's self-proclaimed genius and tolerance", constitutes "affront and slander". The organizations called for The Daily Show and Trevor Noah to issue a retraction and an apology. The Armenian National Committee of America (ANCA) also called for an apology. On October 29 and December 12, 2019, the U.S. House of Representatives and the U.S. Senate officially recognized the Armenian genocide.

In July 2020 the KZV Armenian School and its adjacent Armenian Community Center in San Francisco were vandalized overnight with threatening and racist graffiti. According to San Francisco officials, the attack claimed to support a violent, anti-Armenian movement led by Azerbaijan. The messages contained curse words and appeared to be connected to increased tensions between Azerbaijan and Armenia. The Speaker of the United States House of Representatives Nancy Pelosi noted that "The KZV Armenian School is a part of the beautiful fabric of our San Francisco family. The hateful defacing of this place of community and learning is a disgrace." San Francisco District Attorney Chesa Boudin and San Francisco Mayor London Breed also condemned the hate act. On April 24, 2021, U.S. President Joe Biden officially recognized the Armenian genocide.

On September 24, 2021, the St. Peter Armenian Church in Fernando Valley, California, was vandalized. The suspect broke eight very rare stained glass windows of the church with a baseball bat. The ANCA-WR Executive Director Armen Sahakyan said “This act of vandalism is especially concerning as we recently marked one year since the Armenophobic hate crimes that took place in San Francisco.”. The Los Angeles Police Department continues its investigation on this crime.

In the 2022 Los Angeles City Council scandal, Nury Martinez referred to Areen Ibranossian, an advisor to councillor Paul Krekorian, as "The guy with one eyebrow." Martinez wasn't able to recall the last name and Cedillo replied "It ends in i-a-n, I bet you." Ibranossian said, "This type of depiction of Armenians is not uncommon and is too often tolerated." Growing up in Torrance, California, he was called "towel head" and "camel jockey."

In 2023, the Consumer Financial Protection Bureau (CFPB) ordered Citigroup to pay $24.5 million in fines and $1.4 million in restitution to Armenian Americans, alleging that the bank had illegally discriminated against members of the ethnic group and had unjustly denied them credit cards for which they had applied in a period beginning in 2015 and ending in 2021. According to the CFPB, Citigroup employees used the presence of -ian or -yan in applicant surnames as an indicator that a customer should undergo enhanced screening processes, while also deciding to avoid making mention of this screening method in emails. (The suffixes -ian and -yan are frequently found in Armenian surnames.)

In January 2026, a civil rights complaint against Mehmet Oz, administrator of the Centers for Medicare & Medicaid Services (CMS) since 2025, was filed by California government officials in reference to a video Oz posted accusing Armenian-owned businesses in Los Angeles of involvement with healthcare fraud. Oz had gestured at signs in Armenian language script on a local Armenian bakery, alleging there was fraud "by the Russian Armenian Mafia, you notice the lettering and language behind me". In response, Oz was accused of anti-Armenianism, including by the Armenian National Committee of America.

On April 30, 2026, Florida representative Randy Fine appeared on The Jenny Beth Show and remarked about his Republican primary challenger Dan Bilzerian that he "lives in Las Vegas when he's not in his foreign country of Armenia" (Bilzerian was born in Florida), called him a "little Armenian," and added that "we don't want Armenians to be able to serve in Congress."

== Israel ==
Israel-Armenia relations have been complicated throughout history, resulting in anti-Armenian sentiments in Israel.

The Jerusalem Post reported in 2009 that out of all Christians in Jerusalem's Old City Armenians were most often spat on by Haredi and Orthodox Jews. In 2011 several instances of spitting and verbal attacks on Armenian clergymen by Haredi Jews were reported in the Old City. In a 2013 interview Armenian Patriarch of Jerusalem Nourhan Manougian stated that Armenians in Israel are treated as "third-class citizens". In 2019, it was reported that 60 Armenian Church students attempted to lynch two Jewish men on the eve of Shavuot in Jerusalem, further increasing tensions between the religious groups.

In 2023, Al Jazeera reported that anti-Christian violence, coinciding with anti-Palestinian violence, is becoming more widespread and normalized, especially by fundamentalist and right-wing Jews. Various anti-Christian laws were made, including limiting the amount of worshippers who can enter the Holy Sepulchre. 30 graves in Mount Zion were vandalized, and the Armenian quarter was spray-painted with the words "Death to Arabs, Christians and Armenians."

Israel has long refused to recognize the Armenian genocide, mainly to avoid harming its relations with Turkey. Former President and Prime Minister of Israel Shimon Peres referred to the history of the Armenian Genocide as "meaningless" and said that "We reject attempts to create a similarity between the Holocaust and the Armenian allegations. Nothing similar to the Holocaust occurred. It is a tragedy what the Armenians went through but not a genocide." Other major figures and organizations in Israel have also propped up Turkey's genocide denial. In particular, the Turkish Israeli and Azerbaijani Israeli communities have encouraged genocide denial in Israel. The Knesset Committee on Education, Culture and Sports recognized the Armenian Genocide on August 1, 2016. When visiting the Israeli President the Armenian Patriarchate of Jerusalem on May 9, 2016, Reuven Rivlin concluded his speech by saying that "the Armenians were massacred in 1915. My parents remember thousands of Armenian migrants finding asylum at the Armenian Church. No one in Israel denies that an entire nation was massacred. Recognition of the Armenian Genocide in Israel remains to be an extremely contentious issue influenced heavily by Azerbaijan-Israel Relations.

Israel's strategic alliance with Azerbaijan and Armenia's alliance with Iran have both resulted in hostility between the Israeli and Armenian governments and the subsequent deterioration of Armenia-Israel relations. In both the First and Second Nagorno-Karabakh Wars, Israel has supplied Azerbaijan with advanced weaponry. At a protest against Israel's arms sales to Azerbaijan, counter-protesters smashed a protester's car and blocked the road they were driving along. Many Israelis have also sympathized with Azerbaijan due to Azerbaijan's long and peaceful historical relations with Jews. Because of strong relations between Israel and Azerbaijan, pro-Israeli lobbying groups such as AIPAC have defended and lobbied for Azerbaijan against Armenia.

== ISIS ==
With the breakout of the Syrian Civil War and subsequent rise of ISIS, Armenians, alongside Assyrians, Alawites and Shia Muslims, were some of the groups persecuted in areas occupied by ISIS militants. Armenian sites were targets of ISIS' infamous cultural destruction. After occupying Raqqa, ISIS fighters destroyed the Church of the Martyrs, an Armenian Catholic church.

More infamously, ISIS fighters destroyed the Armenian Genocide Memorial in Deir-ez-Zor, culturally significant to Armenians, as Deir-ez-Zor was the last destination before Armenians in 1915 would reach the Syrian Desert, with many dying along the way.

As ISIS began taking control of many cities, towns and villages, thousands of Christians were forced to flee, either abroad or to other, safer areas in Syria.

== Others ==
=== Pakistan ===
Pakistan only recognized the Republic of Armenia in 2025, citing its support to Azerbaijan in the Nagorno-Karabakh conflict.

=== Tajikistan ===
In early 1990, 39 Armenian refugees from Azerbaijan were settled in Tajikistan. False rumors spread that allegedly up to 5,000 Armenians were being resettled in new housing in Dushanbe (which was experiencing acute housing shortage at that time). This led to riots which targeted both the Communist government and Armenians. The Soviet Ministry of Interior (MVD) suppressed the demonstrations, during which more than 20 people were killed and over 500 were injured.

=== Greece (Byzantine Empire) ===
The Armenians had good relations with the Byzantine Empire for its political and military achievements until the mid-11th century when the Eastern Roman Emperors Constantine IX Monomachos and Constantine X Doukas forbade the Armenian Catholicos, Petros I Gethadardz (1019–1059) and then Khachik II Anetsi (1059–1065) to reside in Ani, where the patriarchate was located and began persecuting Armenians as part of Chalcedonianism and Constantine X campaign crack downs on the Anatolian-landed aristocracy faction which was dominated by mostly Armenian descent generals.

=== Ukraine ===
In 1944, in the town of Kuty in eastern Poland, Ukrainian nationalists from the OUN-UPA massacred (as part of the Massacres of Poles in Volhynia and Eastern Galicia) Armenians and Poles, killing 200 people. Kuty was the largest concentration of Armenians in Poland.

In 2009, an ethnic conflict broke out in the city of Marhanets following the murder of a Ukrainian man by an Armenian. A fight between Ukrainians and Armenians started in the "Scorpion" café, and later turned into riots and pogroms against Armenians, accompanied by the burning of houses and cars, which led to exodus of Armenians from the city.

In 2023, Armenian media accused Oleksiy Danilov, the secretary of Ukraine's National Security and Defense Council, of making anti-Armenian statements.

=== East Turkestan ===
Uyghur separatist leader Isa Alptekin spouted anti-Armenian rhetoric while he was in Turkey and claimed that "our innocent Turkish Muslim brothers" were massacred by "Armenian murderers".

== See also ==
- List of anti-Armenian massacres
- Anti-Oriental Orthodox sentiment
- Anti-Assyrian sentiment
- Persecution of Eastern Orthodox Christians
- Expulsion of Nagorno-Karabakh Armenians
- Destroyed Armenian churches in Turkey
