= Atsız Youth =

Turkish far-right organization

Atsız Youth Genç Atsızlar
- Founder: Burkay Kılavuz
- Founded: May 3, 2005
- Headquarters: Bursa
- Ideology: Atsızism; Turkish ultranationalism; Turanism; Turkic supremacism; Militarism; Anti-Kurdism; Anti-Arabism; Antisemitism
- Political position: Far-right
- Slogan: "Atsız Youth, follow the footsteps of Atsız!"

Website
- https://gencatsizlar.org/ (Under Development)

The Atsız Youth (Turkish: Genç Atsızlar) are a Turkish far-right organization based on the ideology of Nihal Atsız that was founded on May 3, 2005, in Bursa, Turkey.

== History ==
It was announced that it is forbidden to bring the Flag of Azerbaijan in the Turkey-Armenia football match played in Bursa on October 14, 2009. Four members of the Atsiz Youth were detained by the police for planning to bring model planes with Azerbaijani flags into the stadium in the middle of the match.

The Atsiz Youth, who participated in 2012 Taksim Square rally, on the anniversary of the Khojaly massacre, chanted and held banners that said "You are all Armenians, you are all bastards", and "bastards of Hrant don't scare us", as well as "Taksim Square today, Yerevan tomorrow, we will attack you suddenly at night". The rally was talked about on the media for days. It was stated that the group planned an attack against the BDP, Agos Newspaper and the French Consulate during the rally and also planned to attack the MHP politician Ekmeleddin İhsanoğlu later.

After the Syrian Armed Forces killed 36 Turkish soldiers in Idlib on February 27, 2020, the Atsiz Youth organized an "Army-Nation March" in various provinces.

Bursa is described as the stronghold of the Atsiz Youth. In Mevlutcan Kaplan's nationalist hit song "Teşkilat Türküsü" released in 2020, the Atsiz Youth are mentioned. The second verse says "Turan'dır yurdumuz, Genç Atsızlar ordumuz, Ulusun kurdumuz, Dağlardan dağlara", translating to "Turan is our home, the Atsiz Youth is our army, may our wolf keep howling, from mountains to mountains."

== See also ==
- Grey Wolves
- Freedom and Future Association
- Otuken Union Party
