= Turkists of Izmit =

Turkish ultranationalist group based in İzmit

- Leader: Recep Mert
- Founder: Recep Mert
- Headquarters: İzmit, Kocaeli Province, Turkey
- Ideology: Turkish nationalism Pan-Turkism; Turanism; Ultranationalism; Secularism; Anti-communism; Anti-immigration; Anti-Islamism
- Political position: Far-right

The Turkists of Izmit (Turkish: İzmitli Türkçüler) is a Turkish ultranationalist group based in the city of İzmit.

== History ==
The group was founded by Recep Mert in 2023 June. They purposed to unite all Turkists live in specific Kocaeli districts as İzmit, Körfez, Derince, Kandıra, Kartepe, Başiskele, Gölcük, Karamürsel.

They and the Turkists of Gebze collaborated during a protest against Syrian asylum seekers in Turkey, where they spoke against the government’s role in the Syrian civil war, as well as Pan-Islamism, and called for the Turkish government to focus on Turkic affairs such as East Turkestan and Turkmeneli and quit their "Muhajirun" role in Arabic-Islamic affairs.

The Turkists of Izmit stage protests anytime Turkish soldiers are killed. They also had visited Sabri Yalım Park in Izmit to stage a protest there. After the PKK killed 6 Turkish soldiers in Qandil Mountains, the group protested and said "the grandchildren of Sheikh Said will suffer the same fate as their grandfather. We want revenge, no peace, no solution."

Over 100 members of the group marched in Sabri Yalım Park in Izmit after 12 Turkish soldiers were killed. Later, members of the Victory Party, İYİ Party, and university and high school students who were fans of Kocaelispor had joined the march. The group had also invited Tahir Büyükakın, an AKP politician and mayor of Kocaeli, to join the march, although he ignored their invitation and did not come.

Group leader Recep Mert announced on his social media account that he has no ties to any political party.
