= Murder of Sevag Balıkçı =

Shooing of Turkish military officer

Sevag Şahin Balıkçı
- Born: April 1, 1986; Istanbul, Turkey
- Died: April 24, 2011 (aged 25); Batman, Turkey
- Cause of death: Bullet wound
- Resting place: Şişli Armenian Cemetery

Sevag Şahin Balıkçı (April 1, 1986 – April 24, 2011) was a Turkish soldier of Armenian descent who was shot to death during compulsory military service. The incident occurred on April 24, 2011, the remembrance day of the Armenian genocide. The perpetrator Kıvanç Ağaoğlu was sentenced to four and a half years in prison for involuntary manslaughter. However, there have been several eye-witness accounts and testimonies that claim that the shooting was not accidental as the official reports suggest, but intentional. Other reports claim that the shooting was a hate crime towards Balıkçı's Armenian identity.

After the 2016 Turkish coup d'état attempt, military courts were suspended in Turkey and the case was sent to the Kozluk Criminal Court of First Instance of Batman where a retrial started on February 8, 2018. According to the verdict of the Kozluk Criminal Court of First Instance, Kıvanç Ağaoğlu has been found guilty of deliberate murder and sentenced to 16 years and 8 months of imprisonment following which he was arrested.

== Death ==
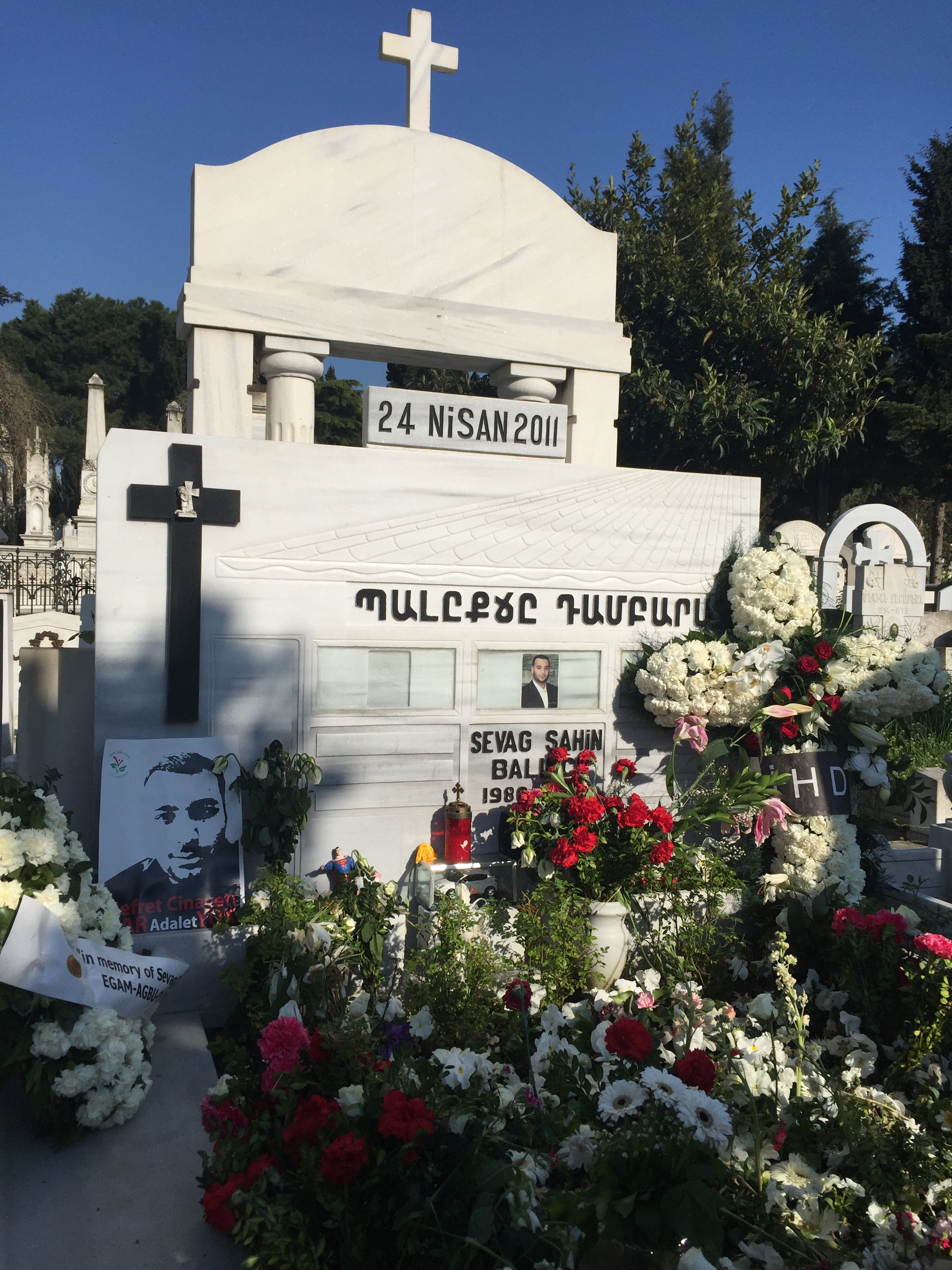
Balıkçı family tomb at the Şişli Armenian Cemetery

Sevag Balıkçı was killed by a gunshot in Batman, southeastern Turkey where he was serving his last 23 days as a conscripted private. Official reports from military commanders in Batman given to the Balıkçı family argued that Sevag was killed unintentionally while "joking around" with his friend. The family believed the initial reports and claimed that their son should not be considered a martyr since he died accidentally. Sevag's fiancée, however, called the report into question because, according to their conversations on the phone with Balıkçı, he was being harassed by ultra-nationalist soldier(s). The funeral was at the Feriköy Surp Vartanants Armenian church. Attendees of the funeral included Rakel Dink (wife of murdered Armenian journalist Hrant Dink), Government Minister Egemen Bağış, Şişli Mayor Mustafa Sarıgül, top military commanders, and other politicians like Adalar Mayor Mustafa Farsakoğlu. He was buried in the Şişli Armenian Cemetery.

== Trial ==
According to Balıkçı's lawyer Cem Halavurt, an investigation conducted on May 1, 2011, into the background (including his internet social networks, which were shut down after the incident) of the suspect, Kıvanç Ağaoğlu, revealed that he was a Turkish ultra-nationalist. Through his Facebook profile, it was discovered that he was a sympathizer of nationalist politician Muhsin Yazıcıoğlu and Turkish agent / contract killer Abdullah Çatlı, who himself had a history of Anti-Armenian activity such as the Armenian Genocide Memorial bombing in a Paris suburb in 1984. His Facebook profile also showed that he was a sympathizerof the Great Union Party (BBP), a far-right nationalist party in Turkey.

The court proceedings took place at the 2nd Air Force Command Court Martial Court in Diyarbakır. The Balıkçı family was represented by lawyer Cem Halavurt while Kıvanç Ağaoğlu is represented by lawyer İbrahim Gök. The Balıkçı family insisted that the shooting was not accidental but intentional and that the suspect should have been charged with murder. The Turkish Military Prosecutor's Office demanded a nine-year sentence for Kıvanç Ağaoğlu on the charge of “murder as a result of negligence.” Kıvanç Ağaoğlu continues to deny all charges of first-degree murder insisting that his gun went off accidentally. Upon suspicion of negligence among the commanders at the military station, non-commissioned officer Sadrettin Ersöz who is represented by lawyer Yalçın Torun was also charged with negligence in the alleged killing.

During the trial's first hearing on July 24, 2011, Kıvanç Ağaoğlu was set free. During the trial an eyewitness provided details regarding the shooting. The eyewitness testified that Kıvanç Ağaoğlu threatened Sevag by saying, "I will kill you fatty!".

During the trial's fifth hearing on December 27, 2011, testimony emerging from Halil Ekşi, a conscripted soldier who was serving in the same military unit as Sevag Balıkçı, stated that Balıkçı's death was not accidental as the official reports suggest, but intentional. This was a reversal of Ekşi's original testimony which portrayed the killing as an accident. He changed his position because his "conscience didn't allow" (vicdanım elvermiyor) him to continue with the original testimony. The testimony also suggested that Halil Ekşi was visited by Kıvanç Ağaoğlu's uncle Bülent Kaya who wrote the testimony with Ekşi himself, suggesting pressure was applied towards the eyewitnesses. The Balıkçı family lawyer Cem Halavurt declared that a new lawsuit will be filed against the uncle and sister of Ağaoğlu for the obstruction of justice. The judge during the hearing also stated that it was a "matter of honor" for him to reach a fair verdict in the case. Testimony given by Sevag Balıkçı's fiancée on March 30, 2012, stated that he was subjected to psychological pressure at the military compound. His fiancé was told by Sevag through telephone conversations with him that he feared for his life because a certain military serviceman threatened him by saying, "If war were to happen with Armenia, you would be the first person I would kill". According to the testimony, Sevag was also under pressure to convert to Islam.

During the trial's ninth hearing on November 5, 2012, defense lawyer İbrahim Gök requested a media ban on all further hearings. Prosecuting attorney Cem Halavurt rejected the proposal stating that "If there is a press ban in this court, will Turkey stop talking about the Armenian issue? Or will people not talk about deaths in the army? This is why we demand that the press ban be overruled. Even if we don't like certain thoughts, we should treat them as part of free speech in a democratic society." İbrahim Gök claimed that the trial was becoming "politicized" and that the case has nothing to do with the events of 1915 (referring to the Armenian genocide). The request for a press ban was rejected.

On March 26, 2013, a court ruled that the incident was accidental and sentenced Kıvanç Ağaoğlu for four years and five months in prison. However, the decision was overturned by the Military Supreme Court in July 2014 on the basis that "legal documents did not include the court's name," and the trial was reinitiated in December 2014. In the meantime, one of the witnesses of the trial who first stated that Balıkçı was killed intentionally and then changed his testimony to argue that Balıkçı was killed accidentally was tried for lying under oath. During this trial, Halil Ekşi, the witness in question, stated that he was forced to lie because he was under pressure, while his family testified that they were being threatened by Ağaoğlu's family. Upon news of this occurrence, the next trial was set for February 27, 2015.

On March 26, 2013, Kıvanç Ağaoğlu was convicted by the Diyarbakır 2nd Air Force Command Military Court for murder with deliberate negligence and sentenced to four years five months and ten days of imprisonment. Later, the Military Supreme Court has overturned the ruling and sent the case for reconsideration. After 2016 Turkish coup d'état attempt, military courts were suspended in Turkey and the case was sent to the Kozluk Criminal Court of First Instance of Batman where the retrial started on February 8, 2018. According to the verdict of the Kozluk Criminal Court of First Instance, Kıvanç Ağaoğlu has been found guilty of deliberate murder and sentenced to 16 years and 8 months of imprisonment following which Ağaoğlu was arrested.

== Criminology report ==
In May 2015, a criminology report was conduct on Balıkçı and it was discovered that 41 bullet holes were found in his military uniform. It was initially stated by the military commandment at the time of the murder that there were two bullet holes.

== Justice initiative ==
A justice initiative was launched in Turkey devoted to the case of Sevag Balıkçı. Members of the panel include the mother of Sevag, Ani Balıkçı, Arat Dink, Kerem Kabadayı, Ufuk Uras, Rakel Dink, and others. The initiative protested the court's decision in letting suspect Kıvanç Ağaoğlu free and proclaimed that Sevag was murdered due to a hate crime. Kerem Kabadayı remarked that "If this hate crime goes unpunished, the Armenian youth in Turkey will be under threat."

== See also ==
- Armenians in Turkey
- Gurgen Margaryan
- Hrant Dink
- Racism in Turkey
