= Turkists of Gebze =

Turkish ultranationalist group based in Gebze

Hürriyet ve İstikbal Derneği
- Leader: Alaattin Kürşat Derebaş
- Founder: Alaattin Kürşat Derebaş
- Headquarters: Gebze, Kocaeli Province, Turkey
- Ideology: Turkish nationalism Pan-Turkism; Turanism; Ultranationalism; Anti-communism; Anti-immigration
- Political position: Far-right

The Turkists of Gebze (Turkish: Gebzeli Türkçüler) is a Turkish ultranationalist group based in Gebze.

== History ==
The group was founded after the COVID-19 pandemic ended by Derebaş, in 2023, also became the district governor for Gebze District for the Victory Party. At only 19 years old, he became the youngest person in all of Turkey to be party chairman of district. The group is known to hold public marches anytime Turkish soldiers are martyred. The group also uses various slogans such as 'martyrs never die, the homeland never divides', 'heroes give their lives to let the nation live', and 'how happy is the one who says I am a Turk'. Its leader, Alaattin Derebaş, is known for his very emotional and passionate speeches which he usually makes loudly after the group's rallies. Derebaş advises every Turk to "be a nationalist" and threatened the Turks who are not nationalists by saying they "will be the first to be tried". Derebaş also stated that the group will not meet with any organisation or politician that is Anti-Turkish, or critical of Mustafa Kemal Atatürk and the Republic of Turkey.

The group collaborated with the Turkists of Izmit (İzmitli Türkçüler), an almost identical but separate organisation led by Recep Mert, who ran for MP for the Victory Party in Kocaeli Province. They made a statement against Syrian asylum seekers in 2023. Both Mert and Derebaş was present, in which Derebaş accused Arab refugees in Turkey of being invaders. He stated that Turkey "is not a holiday resort" for them, and that "the Turkists will continue their war for this homeland with the same spirit and consciousness, just as they fought in China a thousand years ago, and just as they fought in Çanakkale 100 years ago". He says that the independence of the Republic of Turkey, founded by Atatürk in 1923, would be protected at all costs. He also voiced his opposition to Pan-Islamism and advised the Turkish government to focus on Turkmeneli and East Turkestan and stop their Islamic role in the Syrian civil war.

== See also ==
- Atsız Youth
- Grey Wolves
