= Ötüken Union Party =

Turkish ultranationalist political party

Otuken Union Party
- Leader: Çağatay Korkut Görüklü
- Founder: Mehmet Hakan Semerci
- Founded: December 20, 2017
- Headquarters: Ankara, Turkey
- Membership (2026): 0
- Ideology: Atsızism; Turkish nationalism Ultranationalism; Pan-Turkism; Turanism; Neo-fascism; Xenophobia; Anti-Arabism; Anti-Kurdism; Antisemitism; Secularism
- Political position: Far-right

The Otuken Union Party (Turkish: Ötüken Birliği Partisi) is a Turkish ultranationalist political party founded on December 20, 2017.

== History ==
On 20 December 2017, the Otuken Union Party was established by Mehmet Hakan Semerci as an official political party in Turkey. The party is the first Turkish nationalist party which does not deny its racism, but rather takes pride in it. The party is fully secular but has some Tengrist elements. They are named after the city of Otuken in Central Asia where Turkic peoples allegedly originate from. The party admires Nihal Atsız.

The program of the party stated that if the party ever came to power, they would make sure that Turkey is for Turks only, ban marriages between Turks and foreigners, revoke Turkish citizenships and deport those who are not ethnic Turks, change school and İmam Hatip curriculums to further include nationalism, reduce number of Islamic schools as to not exceed the minimum requirement of state-appointed Imams, completely secularise public school curriculum, remove all foreign-language courses in schools until secondary school where they can be taken as electives, although courses in Turkic languages would always be available in all grades, have a zero tolerance policy for refugees, and enforce capital punishment. The party aims to unite Turkic peoples into a united, self-reliant, and globally dominant country.

In 2019, the party visited Sedat Peker.
