= Alfortville Armenian Genocide Memorial bombings =

Attack on an Armenian Genocide Memorial in France

1984 bombing
- Date: 3 May 1984
- Attack type: Terrorist bombing
- Injuries: 13

2002 bombing
- Date: 13 April 2002
- Weapon: Molotov cocktails
- No. of participants: 3

The Alfortville Armenian Genocide Memorial in Alfortville, France, has been attacked twice. The first attack in May 1984 occurred shortly after the memorial was unveiled. This attack was carried out by the Grey Wolves with apparent involvement of the Turkish state. A second attack occurred in 2002, perpetrated by unknown individuals.

== 1984 attack ==
A hit-team headed bomb attack was undertaken at the Armenian Genocide Memorial in Alfortville, France by Grey Wolves member Abdullah Çatlı and paid for by Turkey's National Intelligence Organization. It occurred on 3 May 1984, in a heavily Armenian populated district.

The target chosen for the attack was a memorial dedicated to the victims of the Armenian genocide on the rue Étienne Dolet which was inaugurated on 24 April 1984, the 69th anniversary of the Armenian genocide. The Turkish press denounced the monument as a "monument of hate". About a week after the inauguration, three bombs were reported to have exploded on 3 May 1984, resulting in thirteen injuries, two of them serious. The monument, made of Khachkar stone, was severely damaged in the blasts. The mayor of Alfortville at the time, Joseph Franceschi, who was also the secretary of state for public security, condemned the attack. Jean Poperen, who was the national secretary for the Socialist Party of France, also condemned the attack and expressed his solidarity with the Armenians of France.

An investigation was begun immediately after the attack. It was later reported by one newspaper that the attack was operated by the Turkish National Intelligence Organization or MİT. The memorial bombing came after several bombings that occurred against Armenian institutions and monuments throughout France, such as the bombing of the Armenian Cultural Center in Alfortville in 1983.

== 2002 attack ==
A second attack occurred during the evening of 13 April 2002; three unknown assailants threw three molotov cocktails at the monument, causing serious damage. The attack occurred within days of the 87th anniversary of the Armenian genocide. An investigation was launched by the local Alfortville police but the assailants were never caught.

== See also ==
- Anti-Armenianism
- Iğdır Genocide Memorial and Museum
