= Iğdır Genocide Memorial and Museum =

Memorial-museum complex denying the Armenian genocide

Coordinates: 39°56′13″N 44°04′46″E

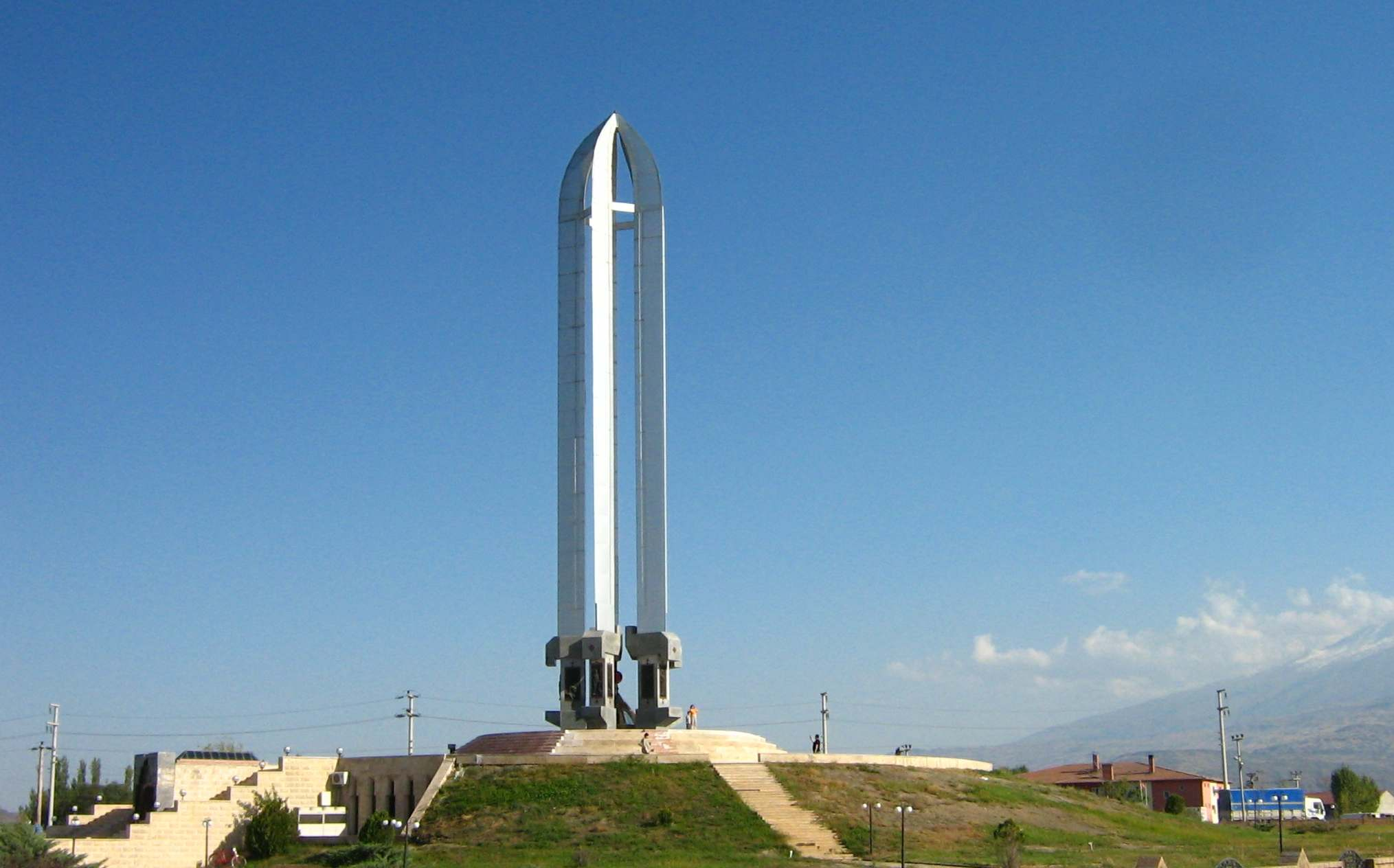
Monument of the Iğdır Genocide Memorial and Museum

The Iğdır Genocide Memorial and Museum (Turkish: Iğdır Soykırım Anıt-Müzesi) is a memorial-museum complex in Iğdır, Turkey. It is known for its denial of the Armenian genocide. The stated aim of the memorial is to "commemorate massacres and persecution committed by Armenians in Iğdır Province" during World War I and the Turkish–Armenian War.

== Purpose in rewriting history ==
The memorial was built to further deny the Armenian genocide through the claim that Armenians massacred Turks, rather than vice versa, during World War I, which is generally accepted by scholars as being untrue. French journalists Laure Marchand and Guillaume Perrier call the monument "the ultimate caricature of the Turkish government's policy of denying the 1915 genocide by rewriting history and transforming victims into guilty parties". Bilgin Ayata on Armenian Weekly criticized the memorial as "aggressive, nationalistic, and outright hostile". The European Armenian Federation for Justice and Democracy announced that the memorial is designed to deny the Armenian genocide and demanded its closure.

== Construction and opening ==
The construction for the memorial started on 1 August 1997 and it was dedicated on 5 October 1999 in Iğdır. Its height is 43.5 metres (143 ft), making it the tallest monument in Turkey. In an address at the monument's opening ceremony, Minister of State Ramazan Mirzaoğlu claimed that Armenians killed almost 80,000 people in Iğdır between 1915 and 1920; the Turkish president Süleyman Demirel was also present.

== Gallery ==
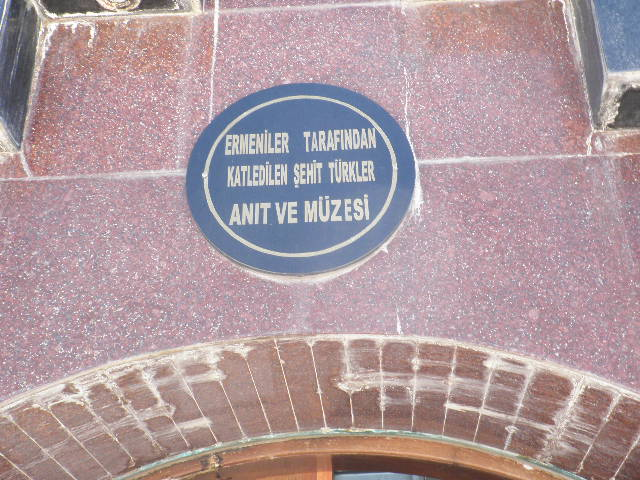
Entrance to the memorial–museum. The plaque reads: Ermeniler tarafından katledilen şehit Türkler anıt ve müzesi ("Martyr Turks massacred by Armenians monument and museum")

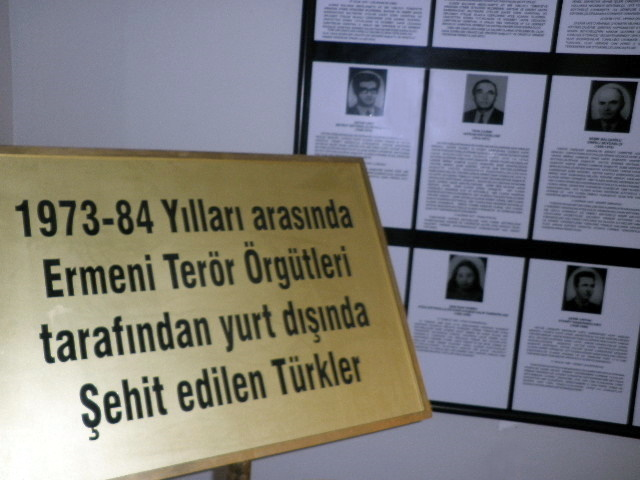
A part of the museum dedicated to Turkish diplomats assassinated by Armenian militant organizations. The sign reads: 1973–84 Yılları arasında Ermeni Terör Örgütleri tarafından yurt dışında Şehit edilen Türkler ("Turks martyred abroad by Armenian terror organizations 1973–84")

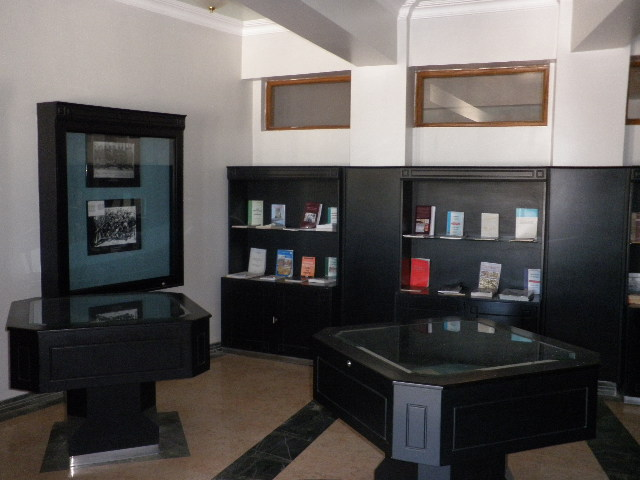
Exhibits of some books

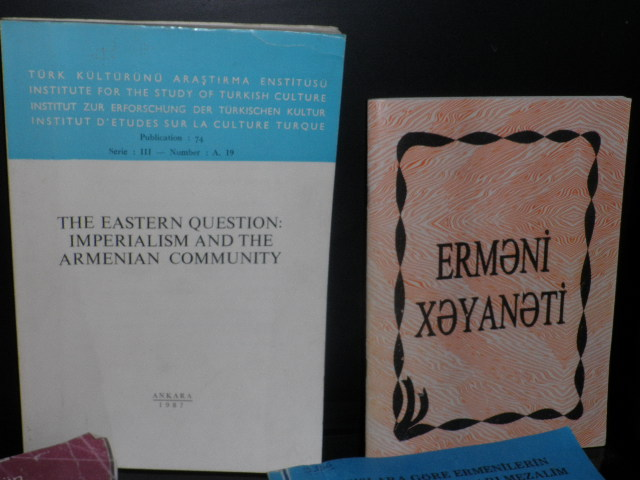
Some books exhibited in the museum

== See also ==
- Accusation in a mirror
- Anti-Armenian sentiment in Turkey
- DARVO – Deny, Attack, Reverse Victim and Offender
- Ottoman casualties of World War I
- Persecution of Muslims during the Ottoman contraction
