= Rock Creek Hills =

Neighborhood of Kensington, Maryland, US

Rock Creek Hills is a mostly residential neighborhood of Kensington, Maryland, United States.

== Location ==
Rock Creek Hills is located in South Kensington. The incorporated Town of Kensington lies to the north, the Capital Beltway and Chevy Chase lie to the south, Connecticut Avenue lies to the west, and the neighborhood of Forest Glen lies to the east.

== History ==
Between the 1920s and the 1960s, religiously and racially restrictive covenants were used in Rock Creek Hills to exclude ethnic and religious minorities. Property deeds specified that houses in Rock Creek Hills "shall never be used or occupied by...negroes or any person or persons, of negro blood or extraction, or to any person of the Semitic Race, blood or origin, or Jews, Armenians, Hebrews, Persians and Syrians, except...partial occupancy of the premises by domestic servants." Over 400 houses in the neighborhood's 33 blocks have been found to have discriminatory covenants in their deeds. In the landmark 1948 Shelley v. Kraemer Supreme Court ruling, discriminatory covenants were prohibited from being enforced by state action, however, private parties could still abide by the terms of the covenants. The covenants were prohibited by law by the Fair Housing Act of 1968, but the racist language still remains on many property deeds. Some residents of Rock Creek Hills have sought to remove the racist and antisemitic language from the deeds.

As of 2020, Rock Creek Hills was 80% white, but the neighborhood was in the process of becoming more racially diverse. 9% of residents were Hispanic or Latino, 4% were Asian, and 3% were Black.

In 2020, the Rock Creek Hills Citizens’ Association along with 51 other local organizations signed a letter opposing Maryland Governor Larry Hogan's proposal to widen the Capital Beltway.
