= 2012 Istanbul rally to commemorate the Khojaly massacre =

Rally in Istanbul, Turkey

Coordinates: 41°02′13″N 28°59′09″E

2012 rally to commemorate the Khojaly massacre
- Date: February 26, 2012
- Location: Taksim Square, Istanbul, Turkey
- Participants: 350,000 including Interior Minister İdris Naim Şahin and Istanbul Governor Huseyin Avni Mutlu

A rally commemorating the twentieth anniversary of the 1992 massacre of Azerbaijani civilians and armed troops by local irregular Armenian forces and the 366th Commonwealth of Independent States Guards Motor Rifle Regiment took place in Istanbul on 26 February 2012. It was the largest campaign within "Justice for Khojaly" framework. The demonstration with slogan "We are all from Khojaly" (Azerbaijani: "Hamımız Xocalılıyıq", Turkish: "Hepimiz Hocalılıyız") started in front of Galatasaray High School and lasted several hours in Taksim Square (Istanbul, Turkey) with around 200,000 participants.

The rally however took a very racist tone as many members of the crowd displayed anti-Armenian slogans containing hate speech and chanted violent threats towards Armenians.

== Demonstration ==
Around 200,000 participants for the 20th anniversary remembrance of the Khojaly Massacre victims, dozens of youth and student organizations, public unions, Turkish organizations and movements participated in the rally. The number of participants was expected to be in the tens of thousands including Azerbaijanis and Turks, while more than 200 000 people of other ethnic backgrounds also joined the rally. The resolution of the rally was read during the protest urging the organizers of the Khojaly Massacre to be punished according to international law. The Istanbul police dispatched heavy security to the French Cultural Center on İstiklal Avenue, where demonstrators were marching, fearing possible attacks on the building.

The rally was attended by nationalist organizations and political parties such as the MHP, Grey Wolves, Atsız Youth, and the Alperen Hearths. Security was increased around the Greek and French consulates whilst the road leading towards the Agos newspaper office was blocked off. Attendance estimates ranged from 20,000 to 100,000 by the organizers.

Istanbul governor Hüseyin Avni Mutlu attended the rally, and it was addressed by the Turkish Interior Minister İdris Naim Şahin who said: "There has never been a stage for such a courageous, honoured, determined, peaceful and brotherly meeting. I salute you! Welcome, shall your unity be everlasting!". Various slogans included, "We are all from Khojaly", "Stop Armenian aggression", "Do not forget Turkic people genocide by Armenian gangs in southern Azerbaijan", "One nation, two countries, Justice for Khojaly!", and "Stop Armenian lies".

=== Racist slogans ===
Some elements of the crowd displayed anti-Armenian slogans containing hate speech and chanted violent threats towards Armenians. The anti-Armenian chants and slogans used by elements of the crowd included: "You are all Armenian, you are all bastards", "Bastards of Hrant cannot scare us", "Today Taksim, Tomorrow Yerevan, we can come suddenly at night", and "Let Armenia be gone". Some chants supported Ogün Samast, the convicted assassin of ethnic Armenian journalist Hrant Dink. Students at the Süleyman Demirel University in Isparta reportedly chanted "Mount Ağrı will become your grave".

== Related events ==
- Simultaneously, the Youth Forum of the Organisation of Islamic Cooperation (OIC) opened an exhibition of photos and paintings in Istanbul within the framework of an international campaign titled Justice for Khojaly. The exhibition takes place at the Taksim Metro Station Exhibition Hall.
- To commemorate the 20th anniversary of the Khojaly massacre, thousands of people gathered in the Turkish capital city Ankara as well.

== Reactions ==
The Armenian National Committee of America condemned the rally and urged the United States Ambassador to Turkey, Francis Ricciardone, to immediately condemn the demonstration. The Agos bilingual Turkish Armenian newspaper similarly condemned the demonstrations and organized a demonstration on 4 March calling for 'an end to racism' and 'brotherhood for all peoples'.

The Union of Socialist Azerbaijanis of Turkey issued a statement noting that the events surrounding the Khojali demonstrations should not be used "as a tool to deny the Armenian genocide". A union member claimed in the Taraf newspaper "that the government of Azerbaijan had subsidized the travel costs for some of the participants in the demonstration at a cost of about US$ 2 million".

On February 27, the head of Parliament's Human Rights Commission, Ayhan Sefer Ustun, called on Turkey's prosecutors to take action against protesters who held up racist signs at the rally. He told journalists that the hateful messages "completely devalued" the commemorative nature of the event.

The European Union raised concerns regarding the anti-Armenian slogans. A statement by the European Commission urged Turkey and its media to adopt a code of ethics on respect to religious minorities and the necessity to adopt new legislation to prosecute the incitement of hatred.

== Arrests ==
On 18 April 2012 the police in Istanbul arrested nine people in connection with the protests. They were released after stating that just before the demonstrations they were handed the offending banners by people unknown to them.

== See also ==
- Anti-Armenian sentiment in Turkey
- First Nagorno-Karabakh War
