= Atsızism =

Turkish ultranationalist ideology

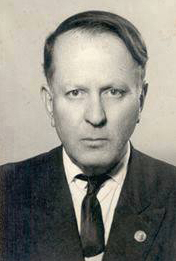
Nihal Atsız in 1930

Atsızism (Turkish: Atsızcılık) is a far-right ideology based on the thoughts of Nihal Atsız, a Turkish ultranationalist writer and ideologue.

== History ==
Atsızism is known for its hardcore Turkish nationalism, Pan-Turkism, Turanism, and racism. Atsız viewed Turkish nationalism as being empty if Pan-Turkism and Turanism were not included in it. Although the term "Turanism" refers to the unity of all Ural-Altaic peoples (including Turkic peoples), Atsız used "Turanism" as a mere synonym of "Pan-Turkism", he had the goal of uniting only the Turkic peoples and did not care about other Ural-Altaic peoples. A famous quote of Atsız was "a Turk has no friend except for another Turk." He also stated "we are not Europeans, we are Asians and we are cold as ice, and above all, we are Turks."

Atsız was also a fierce critic of Mustafa Kemal Atatürk and much of his policies, although his negative views on Atatürk are replaced with a positive view after the 1960 coup. He claimed that Kemalism had too much foreign elements. He described Atatürk's "Peace at Home, Peace in the World", as "extinguishing the spiritual energy of the nation" and stated that "nations are obliged to make invasions and prospections in order to spread their own lineage and dominate the earth."

Atsız was a staunch anti-communist during his entire career, and had referred to it as "a very harmful ideology to us." He hated İsmet İnönü and his government due to their cooperation with communists. Atsız was openly and proudly racist, although he opposed scientific racism and even mocked his guests who asked to measure their heads by "measuring", using a device that is originally used to find the month of pregnancy and giving random percentages to determine their "Turkishness". According to him, racism was "not about measuring heads, analysing blood, or counting seven ancestors as a couple of phony zanies claimed", and during the Racism-Turanism trials, he stated that he considers mixed Turks as Turks as long as they serve Turkishness and don't have any loyalty to their other race.

Atsız considered all Turkic peoples worldwide of having the same blood, and therefore being equally Turks, although "alien people" living in Turkey are not Turks even if they speak fluent Turkish and feel culturally Turkish.

Atsız harshly condemned Kemalism, the founding ideology of the Republic of Turkey. He also perceived Kemalism as lacking Turanism and Pan-Turkism, and therefore unqualified to be considered a Turkish nationalist ideology. According to Atatürk's nationalism during the Early Republican Period (1923–50), every citizen of Turkey is a Turk, and that ethnic and religious origins do not matter as long as they feel like Turks and identify as Turkish. Atsızism was described as being based entirely on race and lineage. Atsız also criticised the nationalism of Ziya Gökalp and Hamdullah Suphi Tanrıöver because he perceived it as not being nationalist enough.

Atsız was extremely antisemitic, referring to Jews as being among "the internal enemies" of Turks, although he admired how Jews revived their dead language and "retook the land they lost 2,000 years ago", which he viewed as an example of what a strong sense of nationalism can achieve. He also referred to Jews as being "the secret enemies of all nations."

Atsız believed that Turks and non-Turks should not intermarry under any circumstance, and that nationalism was much more important than love. He also believed that nationalism was superior than any religion, especially Islam, which is against nationalism.

Initially, Atsız referred to Islam as the "national religion" of Turks, although he became a staunch critic of Islam later. Atsız claimed that Arabs had created Islam as a way to form a union, due to their lack of unity before Islam. Atsız even described Islam as "a religion created by Arabs, for Arabs". He denied the existence of Allah, and claimed that the Quran was entirely made up and written by Muhammad himself and falsely attributed to Allah. Atsız advocated for Turks to return to their pre-Islamic beliefs. He was among the first to use "Tanrı" to refer to God, instead of "Allah" which was the common term for God during his time used even by non-Muslims. Atsız especially hated Pan-Islamism, and claimed that Turks were a great nation before they accepted Islam, and that they only need unity with other Turkic people rather than other Muslims. Atsız believed that a Turkic union needed war to be achieved.

Atsız also favored Nazi Germany during their war with the Soviet Union, and was even accused of being inspired by Adolf Hitler, although he denied these claims as he already started forming Atsızism before Hitler rose to popularity in Turkey.

Atsız especially and namely hated Arabs, Armenians, Kurds, Greeks, Persians, Han Chinese, Bulgarians, Serbs, Croats, Bosniaks, Romanians, Europeans, Blacks, Japanese, Jews, Pashtuns, Americans, Circassians, Chechens, Abazins, Albanians, Pomaks, Laz, Lezgins, and Georgians.

Atsızism influenced a type of Turkish nationalism known as Idealism, which was later associated with Alparslan Türkeş, who agreed with the nationalism of Atsızism, but not the hatred of Islam. Idealism was designed to pick nationalism whenever nationalism and Islam contradict. Atsız believed that Turkish nationalism and Islamism are incompatible, and that Türkeş was desperately trying to force two contradictory ideologies together, and he had criticised him multiple times for it. Muhsin Yazıcıoğlu further divided Idealism on the topic of what to choose when nationalism and Islam contradict each other.

== See also ==
- Völkisch movement
- Völkisch nationalism
