= Timeline of modern Greek history =

This is a timeline of modern Greek history.

== Greek War of Independence (1821–1828) ==
- 1821, 21 February: Revolt of Greek War of Independence from the Ottoman Empire declared by Alexandros Ypsilantis in Wallachia (Iaşi).
- 1821, 25 March: According to tradition, Metropolitan Germanos of Patras blesses a big Greek flag at the Monastery of Agia Lavra in Peloponnesia and proclaims to people assembled the beginning of a Greek Revolution. Greece declares its independence. Beginning of the Greek War of Independence.
- 1821, 10 April, Easter Monday: Ecumenical Patriarch Gregory V of Constantinople gets hanged, outside the door of the Patriarchate, by the Turks. The door has remained shut and out of use ever since
- 1821, 17 April: Former Ecumenical Patriarch Cyril VI is hanged in the gate of the Adrianople's cathedral
- 1821, 4 April: Constantine Mourousis, Dimitrios Paparigopoulos and Antonios Tsouras are decapitated by the Ottomans in Constantinople
- 1821, 5 April: The Phanariotes Petros Tsigris, Dimitrios Skanavis and Manuel Hotzeris are decapitated by the Turks, while Georgios Mavrocordatos is hanged by the Sultan forces in Constantinople
- 1821, 23–24 April: Battle of Alamana. After the Greek defeat, Athanasios Diakos is impaled on a spit.
- 1821, 4 May: Metropolitans Gregorios of Derkon, Dorotheos of Adrianople, Ioannikios of Tyrnavos, Joseph of Thessaloniki, and the Phanariote Georgios Callimachi and Nikolaos Mourousis are decapitated on Sultan's orders in Constantinople
- 1821, May: The Turkish governor Yusuf Bey orders his men to kill every Greek in Thessaloniki that they find. The killings last for days, with the metropolitan and major notables among the victims
- 1821, 2 June: Destruction of Kydonies in Asia Minor by the Ottoman army. Tens of thousands of Greek inhabitants become refugees
- 1821, 24 June: The massacre of Heraklion or 'the great ravage' occurs against the Greek community in Crete. Among the victims are the metropolitan of Crete and bishops
- 1821, 9 July: The chief of the Cypriot Orthodox Church Archbishop Kyprianos, along with 486 prominent Greek Cypriots, amongst them the Metropolitans Chrysanthos of Paphos, Meletios of Kition and Lavrentios of Kyrenia, are executed by beheading or hanging by the Turks in Nicosia
- 1821, July: Küçük Mehmet carries out several days of massacres of Greek Cypriots in Cyprus since July 9 and continues on for forty days, despite the Vizier's command to end the plundering since 20 July 1821
- 1821, 11 September: Tripolitsa captured by the Greeks, who proceed to eliminate the Turkish garrison, officials and civilians. A total of about 30,000 people perish.
- 1821, 15 October: Turkish Cypriot mobs hang most of the Greek Cypriots in Larnaca and other towns, among them an archbishop, five bishops, thirty six ecclesiastics
- 1822, 9 April: After a month's resistance, the city of Naousa is captured by Abdul Abud, devastating the city and massacring its Greek population. Ending of the Greek revolution in Macedonia.
- 1822: The Chios massacre occurs. A total of about 100,000 people perish, mostly Greeks.
- 1822, 26 July, Battle at Dervenakia. A decisive victory of the Greeks which saved the revolution.
- 1823, 18 January: Nafplio becomes the site of the Revolutionary Government.
- 1823, March: The United Kingdom of Great Britain and Ireland, represented by George Canning, recognizes the Greeks as a nation at war, thus recognizing de facto the Greek Independence.
- 1824, 7–8 June: The civilization of the island of Kasos is completely destroyed by the Turkish-Egyptian forces of Hussein Rushdi Pasha. About 7,000 people perish.
- 1824, 21 June: More than 15,000 Greeks of Psara are slaughtered by the forces of Koca Hüsrev Mehmed Pasha.
- 1824: The First Siege of Missolonghi occurs.
- 1825, 22 May: Laskarina Bouboulina is assassinated in Spetses.
- 1825, 5 June: Odysseas Androutsos is assassinated in Athens.
- 1825, 22 June: Ibrahim Pasha retakes Tripoli, kills the Greek population and destroys the city and its walls.
- 1825, 6 November: Beginning of the Third Siege of Missolonghi.
- 1826, 10–11 April: The Sortie of Missolonghi occurs. Approximately 8,000 Greek soldiers and civilians perish.
- 1826, 24 June: Battle of Vergas.
- 1826, 11 November: Prime Minister Andreas Zaimis transfers the site of the government to Aegina.
- 1827, 22–24 April: Battle of Phaleron. Georgios Karaiskakis is killed in action.
- 1827, July 6: Signing of the Treaty of London.
- 1827, 20 October: Battle of Navarino.
- 1828, 24 January: John Capodistria is elected Governor of Greece.
- 1828, 31 January: Alexander Ypsilantis dies in Vienna.

== First Hellenic Republic (1828–1832) ==
The First Hellenic Republic (Greek: Αʹ Ελληνική Δημοκρατία) is a historiographic term used for a series of councils and "Provisional Governments" during the Greek War of Independence. During the first stages of the rebellion, various areas elected their own regional governing councils. These were replaced by the united administration at the First National Assembly of Epidaurus during early 1822, which also adopted the first Greek Constitution. A series of National Assemblies ensued, while Greece was threatened with collapse due to civil war and the victories of Ibrahim Pasha. In 1827, the Third National Assembly at Troezen selected Count Ioannis Kapodistrias as Governor of Greece for seven years. He arrived in 1828 and established the Hellenic State, commanding with quasi-dictatorial powers. He was assassinated by political rivals in 1831 and was succeeded by his brother, Augustinos Kapodistrias until the Great Powers declared Greece a Kingdom and selected the Bavarian Prince Otto to be its king.

== Kingdom of Greece (1832–1924) ==
=== Reign of King Otto (1832–1862) ===
- 1843, 3 September: Military coup and revolution caused by the King's refusal to grant a constitution. King Otto agrees to convene a National Assembly to prepare a constitution.
- 1843, 15 September: Andreas Metaxas becomes the first Constitutional Prime Minister of Greece.
- 1844, March 18: The Greek Constitution of 1844 is voted into effect.
- 1850, 4 January: Pacifico incident. Blockade of the port of Piraeus by the British fleet.
- 1854, 14 May: Anglo-French occupation of Piraeus to ensure Greek neutrality during the Crimean War, although a Greek volunteer battalion participates in the Siege of Sevastopol. Cholera epidemic begins in the capital, transmitted by the foreign troops.
- 1861: Assassination attempt against Queen Amalia.
- 1862, 10 October: Military coup. Otto leaves the throne and the country.

=== Reign of King George I (1863–1913) ===
- 1863: Prince William of Denmark becomes the new King of the Hellenes, as George I.
- 1864, 2 May: Britain donates the Ionian Islands to Greece, as coronation gift to King George I.
- 1864: Assassination attempt against Alexandros Koumoundouros.
- 1864, 7 August: Greece has a new constitution which establishes a Constitutional Monarchy.
- 1864, 28 November: New constitution, unicameral assembly and constitutional monarchy created.
- 1866: Beginning of the Great Cretan Revolution (1866–1869). The exiled King Otto donates most of his fortune for the cause.
- 1877, 2 September: Hero of the War of Independence and current Prime Minister Konstantinos Kanaris dies.
- 1878, 13 June: Beginning of the Treaty of Berlin. Eastern Rumelia becomes autonomous province of the Ottoman Empire.
- 1878, Summer: Cretan rebellion, halted speedily by British intervention.
- 1880–1920: Approximately 400,000 Greeks emigrate to America due to widespread unemployment and economic problems.
- 1881, 3 April: Earthquake strikes Chios. 3,550 people are reported dead.
- 1881: Thessaly becomes part of Greece.
- 1882, 3 March: Prime Minister Alexandros Koumoundouros resigns.
- 1885, May: Prime Minister Theodoros Deligiannis mobilizes the Greek Army in accordance with the Bulgarian revolt. Fearing modification of the Treaty of Berlin, the British Royal Navy blockades Greece.
- 1885, 6 September: Bloodless revolution in Eastern Rumelia and unification of the province with Bulgaria.
- 1893: Completion of the Corinth Canal.
- 1894, 27 April: Earthquakes occur in Atalanti. 255 people are dead.
- 1896, 6 April: Opening ceremonies of the first modern Olympic Games in Athens.
- 1897, January: Cretan Rebellion. Greece refuses a Turkish offer of an autonomous administration in Crete and mobilizes for war.
- 1897, 25 February: Greece refuses to withdraw the Greek volunteers from Crete. The Great Powers announce a blockade of Greece.
- 1897, 17 April: The Ottoman Empire declares war against Greece. Greco-Turkish War (1897).
- 1897, 27 April: Greece loses the war, agrees to surrender Crete to international administration, to make minor territorial concessions in Thessaly in favor of the Turks and to pay a large indemnity.
- 1898: Creation of the Cretan State.
- 1904: Beginning of the Greek Struggle for Macedonia.
- 1904, 13 October: Pavlos Melas is killed in Macedonia.
- 1905, 13 June: Assassination of Prime Minister Theodoros Deligiannis.
- 1908: Cretan deputies declare unilateral union with Greece.
- 1910, January: The Military League forces Parliament and King George I to summon a National Assembly to revise the Constitution of Greece.
- 1910, March 6: A protest in Kileler by the serfs of Thessaly for agricultural reform is violently suppressed by the Army.
- 1910, 2 October: Eleftherios Venizelos becomes Prime Minister of Greece.

=== First Balkan War ===
- 1912, 8 October: The members states of the Balkan League, after issuing ultimata, declare war on Turkey. Beginning of the First Balkan War.
- 1912, 22 October: Greek victory at the Battle of Sarantaporo.
- 1912, 1 November: Greek victory at the Battle of Giannitsa.
- 1912, 6–12 November: Greek victory at the Battle of Pente Pigadia.
- 1912, 9 November: The Greek army enters Thessaloniki. Most of southern Macedonia is occupied by Greece.
- 1912, 15 November: A Greek division marching towards Monastir is thrown back at the Battle of Vevi.
- 1912, 16 December: Greek victory at the Naval Battle of Elli.
- 1913, 18 January: Greek victory at the Naval Battle of Lemnos.
- 1913, 20–21 February: After overcoming Ottoman defenses in the Battle of Bizani, the Greek army enters Ioannina. Epirus is liberated.
- 1913, 18 March: King George I is assassinated in Thessaloniki. He's succeeded by his eldest son, King Constantine I.
- 1913, 30 May: Signing of the Treaty of London. End of the First Balkan War.

=== Second Balkan War ===
- 1913, 16 June: Bulgarian forces attack Greece and Serbia. Beginning of the Second Balkan War.
- 1913, 19–21 June: Greek victory at the Battle of Kilkis-Lahanas.
- 1913, 22–23 June: Greek victory at the Battle of Doiran.
- 1913, 8–18 July: Greeks and Bulgarians fight to a bloody stalemate at the Battle of Kresna Gorge.
- 1913, 10 August: Signing of the Treaty of Bucharest. End of the Second Balkan War. Much of Macedonia is transferred from Bulgaria to Greece.

=== National Schism ===
- 1914: According to the Protocol of Corfu, Northern Epirus is granted autonomy within Albania. Beginning of the Greek genocide.
- 1915, January: King Constantine I forces Venizelos to resign. The National Schism begins.
- 1915, October: French and British forces land in Thessaloniki, establishing the Salonika front.
- 1915, December: Constantine I forces Venizelos to resign for a second time and dissolves the Liberal-dominated parliament. Venizelos leaves Athens.
- 1916, April: The autonomy of Northern Epirus is revoked by the Albanian government, in violation of the Protocol of Corfu.
- 1916, August:
- 1916, 30 August: Successful anti-royalist coup by the Movement of National Defence. Venizelos returns to the Greek mainland. Henceforth, Greece has two governments: the royalist government in Athens commanded by the King and the "Temporary Government of National Defence" commanded by Venizelos in Thessaloniki.
- 1916, 18 November: The "Noemvriana" (November events). Royalist paramilitary units, named the "League of Reservists", target the Venizelists. Armed clashes between Reservists and French marines in Athens. The Allies institute a naval blockade of Greece. French and British forces land in Thessaly and enter the regional capital of Larissa.
- 1916, 21 November: HMHS Britannic, British merchant ship, sinks by a mine near Kea. 30 people die.
- 1917, June: French and British forces occupy Piraeus, bombard Athens and force the Greek fleet to surrender. Constantine I abdicates, he and his eldest son George (barred from succession) leave the country. His second son Alexander becomes King Alexander I and Venizelos is restored as Prime Minister in Athens.
- 1917, 19 August: The Great Fire of Thessaloniki destroys most of the city.

=== World War I ===
- 1917, July: Greece officially declares war on the Central Powers.
- 1918, 29–31 May: Battle of Skra-di-Legen ends in Greek victory.
- 1918, 2–5 August: 1918 Toronto anti-Greek riot
- 1918, 30 October: Signing of the Armistice of Mudros, which ended World War I in the Near East.

=== Greco-Turkish War ===
- 1918–1923 Allied Occupation of Constantinople.
- 1919, 15 May: The Greek army lands in Smyrna (now called İzmir). Beginning of the Greco-Turkish War.
- 1919, 27 June-4 July: Battle of Aydın.
- 1919, 27 November: Signing of the Treaty of Neuilly. Greece acquires Western Thrace.
- 1920, 10 August: Signing of the Treaty of Sèvres. Greece acquires Eastern Thrace and is assigned administration of the area of Izmir for 5 years.
- 1920, 12 August: First assassination attempt against Venizelos in the Gare de Lyon railway station in Paris.
- 1920, 13 August: Assassination of prominent royalist Ion Dragoumis in Athens.
- 1920, November: Despite his achievements, Venizelos is defeated in the 1920 General Elections.
- 1920, 25 October: King Alexander I dies suddenly of infection caused by the bite of a monkey of the Royal Gardens.
- 1920, 17 November: After the death of her grandson, Queen Olga becomes regent of Greece, until the return of her son.
- 1920, 19 December: Constantine I returns as King, following a plebiscite.
- 1921, 9–12 January: First Battle of İnönü.
- 1921, 26–31 March: Second Battle of İnönü.
- 1921: Assassination attempt against George Papandreou.
- 1921, 26 August-13 September: Battle of Sakarya.
- 1922, 26–30 August: Battle of Dumlupınar.
- 1922, 9 September: The Turkish army enters Izmir. Metropolitan Chrysostomos of Smyrna, is lynched by the angry people.
- 1922, 13 September: Izmir is set on fire. Approximately 100,000 Greeks perish.
- 1922, September: The Greek Army, Navy and people revolt. The government is deposed and the King forced to resign. Venizelos returns in Greece.
- 1922, 27 September: King Constantine I abdicates (second time), being succeeded by his eldest son King George II.
- 1922, 28 November: According to the verdict of the Trial of the Six, the former Prime Minister Dimitrios Gounaris, the Commander in Chief of the Greek Armies Georgios Hatzianestis and four other politicians are executed as responsible for the Asia Minor Catastrophe.
- 1923, 24 July: Signing of the Treaty of Lausanne. The Greeks of Istanbul, Imbros and Tenedos (about 279,788 in Istanbul alone the next year) are excluded from the population exchange. The islands of Imbros and Tenedos are granted autonomy, by article 14, which was never implemented.

=== Restoration of stability ===
- 1923: Greece has an enormous refugee problem with the arrival of approximately 1.5 million Greeks from Asia Minor (according to the population exchange agreement of the Treaty of Lausanne. The population of the bankrupt Greece increased by 1/3 in a period of a few months. The fate of the rest 1 million Greeks of Asia Minor (according to the Ottoman census) remains unknown.
- 1923, 31 August: The Corfu incident. Mussolini's forces bombard and briefly occupy the Greek island of Corfu.
- 1923, October: Failed anti-Venizelist military coup, begun out of fear for the upcoming elections' result.
- 1923, 16 December: Venizelos's Liberal Party wins the elections.
- 1923, 19 December: King George II is "asked" to leave the country. Admiral Pavlos Kountouriotis is named Regent.

== Second Hellenic Republic (1924–1935) ==
- 1924, 25 March: Greece is proclaimed a republic, deposing King George II. Pavlos Kountouriotis becomes the first President of Greece.
- 1924, 13 April: A plebiscite condones the change of constitution.
- 1924, 7 October: Failed military coup.
- 1925, 15 March: Successful coup directed by General Theodoros Pangalos. President Pavlos Kountouriotis resigns.
- 1925, 22 October: The brief War of the Stray Dog with Bulgaria. Greece is imposed a fine, but is able to stop the attacks by the Internal Macedonian Revolutionary Organization (IMRO) komitadjis into Greek Macedonia.
- 1926, 23 August: General Pangalos is overthrown after a coup. Caretaker government of Georgios Kondylis.
- 1928: Venizelos returns from exile and his Liberals win power again.
- 1932, 26 September: The village of Ierissos in Chalcidice is destroyed by a powerful earthquake. 161 people are reported dead.
- 1933, March: Failed pro-Venezelist coup.
- 1933, 23 April: Kos is struck by an earthquake. 200 people die.
- 1933, 6 June: Second assassination attempt against Venizelos in Athens.
- 1935, March: Failed coup directed by Venizelos and Nikolaos Plastiras. Venizelos flees in France and dies in Paris the next year, the armed forces are purged of Venizelist and Republican officers.
- 1935, 10 October: Coup directed by Georgios Kondylis abolishes the Republic, confirmed by a rigged plebiscite later the same year.

== Kingdom of Greece restored (1935–1967) ==
- 1935, 3 November: George II is restored to the throne.

=== 4 August Regime (1936–1940) ===
- 1936, 4 August: Coup by General Ioannis Metaxas, who declares a state of emergency, decrees martial law, annuls various articles of the Constitution and establishes a crisis cabinet to end the increasing riots and to restore social order.
- 1937, 15 December: Mass NKVD operation against Greeks in the USSR begins, based on Joseph Stalin's Directive 50125 of Dec. 1937, resulting in the loss of 38,000 Soviet citizens of Hellenic descent at the Gulags of Siberia.
- 1939: Hatay is annexed by Turkey. The immigration of the Antiochian Greeks reaches its maximum.
- 1940, 15 August: Torpedoing and sinking of the Greek light cruiser Elli in Tinos harbor on 15 August 1940 (a national religious holiday), by an Italian submarine. The Greek government announced that the attack had been performed by a submarine of "unknown nationality", in an attempt to keep Greece neutral.

=== World War II (1940–1944) ===
==== Greco-Italian War and Battle of Greece (1940–1941) ====
- 1940, 28 October: After Greek dictator Ioannis Metaxas rejects an Italian ultimatum demanding the occupation of Greek territory, Italian forces invade Greece. Beginning of the Greco-Italian War.
- 1940, 13 November: The Battle of Pindus ends in a complete Greek victory.
- 1940, 14 November: The Greek forces enter Albanian territory.
- 1940, 24 December: The Greek army controls practically all of Northern Epirus.
- 1941: Turkey mobilizes all Greeks between 18 and 45 years of age and deports them to labour battalions in central Anatolia.
- 1941, 29 January: Ioannis Metaxas dies in Athens.
- 1941, 1 March: Earthquake occurs in Larissa leaving 40 people dead and thousands homeless.
- 1941, 9–20 March: The Italian Spring Offensive fails to dislocate the Greek forces.
- 1941, 6 April: The German Army invades Greece.
- 1941, 11–12 April: Battle of Vevi.
- 1941, 18 April: The German Army advances towards Athens. Prime Minister Alexandros Koryzis commits suicide.
- 1941, 20 April: The Greek First Army surrenders to the Germans.
- 1941, 21 April: The German forces manage to go through the Metaxas Line.
- 1941, 22 April: The King, the Royal family and the Government flee Athens and go to Crete.
- 1941, 27 April: The German Army enters Athens. Greek writer Penelope Delta commits suicide. The Nazi flag is raised on Acropolis; Evzone soldier on guard duty jumps off the Acropolis wrapped in the Greek flag.
- 1941, May: The Allied forces impose a naval blockade of Greece, ending off all imports, including foods.
- 1941, 4 May: Out of respect for the Greek nation, Hitler orders the Wehrmacht not to take Greek war prisoners and allows them to carry weapons.
- 1941, 20 May: Beginning of the Battle of Crete.
- 1941, 22 May: The King, the Royal family and the Government are evacuated to Alexandria.
- 1941, 1 June: The remaining defenders at Sphakia surrender to the German Army.

==== Axis occupation and Resistance (1941–1944) ====
- 1941, 30 May: The first resistance act occur in Athens. Two law students tear down the Flag of Nazi Germany from the Acropolis.
- 1941, 27 September: The National Liberation Front (EAM), the largest resistance group, is initiated.
- 1941, 28–29 September: A spontaneous rebellion in Drama is repressed by the Bulgarian occupation forces with a death toll of 3,000.
- 1941, 17 October: Executions of the male population and burning of the village Kerdyllia by the Nazis, with a death toll of 235.
- 1941, 23–28 October: Massive executions of the inhabitants of the villages Mesovouno, Cleisto, Kidonia and Ambelofito by the Nazis.
- 1941–1942, Winter: The Great Famine. An estimated 300,000 Greeks perish during the period of occupation, with mortality reaching a maximum during that winter.
- 1942: The Fortune Tax (Varlık Vergisi) is imposed on the Greeks in Turkey (as well as on others, mostly non-Muslims), resulting in their financial ruination.
- 1942, June: The Greek People's Liberation Army begins operating in the mountains.
- 1942, Summer: The great suffering and the pressure of the exiled Greek government eventually forces the British partially to lift the blockade. The International Red Cross is able to distribute food supplies in sufficient quantities.
- 1942, 25 November: The Gorgopotamos bridge is blown up in a common operation between the Greek militants and British saboteurs (Operation Harling). This successful operation disrupted the German transportation of ammunition via Greece to the Nazi Africa Corps commanded by Rommel.
- 1943, 27 February: Poet Kostis Palamas dies. His funeral becomes a public show of defiance to the occupation authorities.
- 1943, March: The Germans began mass deportations of the Jews of Thessaloniki to Auschwitz. By the end of the war, an estimated 60,000 Greek Jews were murdered.
- 1943, 16 August: 317 inhabitants of Kommeno are murdered and the village is burned by the Nazis.
- 1943, September: The Nazi attempt to exterminate the Jews of Athens fails, thanks to the combined efforts of Archbishop Damaskinos, Greek resistance groups and some of the Greek people.
- 1943, 13 September: More than 5,000 Italian soldiers are executed by the Nazis in Cephallonia or perish in the sea, during the German takeover of the Italian occupation areas.
- 1943, 26 September-16 November: Battle of Leros, the culmination of the Dodecanese Campaign.
- 1943, 13 December: The Massacre of Kalavryta occurs.
- 1944, 10 March: the EAM-controlled Political Committee of National Liberation is established.
- 1944, 10 June: The Distomo massacre. 218 civilians are murdered and the village is looted and burnt.

==== Restoration of the Greek Government ====
- 1944, 14 October: Athens is liberated and the Greek government-in-exile returns, with George Papandreou as Premier.
- 1944, 18 October: Premier George Papandreou and his national unity government repatriate.
- 1944, 3 December: "Dekemvriana" (December events). 28 people are killed by British troops and policemen in Athens.
- 1944, 4 December: George Papandreou attempts to resign.
- 1944, 12 December: ELAS controls most of Athens and its environs.
- 1945, 12 February: EAM and the Greek Government sign Varkiza agreement to end fighting.
- 1945, 16 June: Former ELAS leader Aris Velouchiotis is killed or commits suicide.
- 1945, 17 October: Archbishop Damaskinos assumes as regent in an attempt to stabilize the country.
- 1945, 24 October: Greece becomes one of the founding members of the United Nations.

=== Civil War (1946–1949) ===
- 1946, 31 March: Fighting resumes between the Government and the Communists,as a group of 30 ex-ELAS members attacked a police station in the village of Litochoro, killing the policemen, the night before the elections.
- 1946, 31 March: 1946 Greek parliamentary election; the first elections in Greece after 10 years.
- 1946, 28 September: A national referendum favours constitutional monarchy.
- 1946: King George II returns to Greece.
- 1947, 20 January: The deadliest shipwreck of modern Greek history occurs when Himara sinks in the South Evian Gulf, resulting in 391 deaths. It remains unknown if the cause was the bad weather, a mine or sabotage.
- 1947, 1 April: King George II dies of sudden heart failure in the Palace in Athens. Some Greeks do not believe the announcement, considering it a joke. He is succeeded by his younger brother Paul.
- 1947, December: Approximately 1,200 Communist militants are killed in a battle near Konitsa
- 1948: The Communists reach the maximum of their power.
- 1949, August: General Alexander Papagos begins a major counter-offensive against Communist forces in northern Greece, pushing them into Albania.
- 1949, 16 October: Nikolaos Zachariadis, commander of the Communist guerillas, announces a ceasefire that ends the Greek Civil War.

=== Postwar Greece (1950–1967) ===
- 1950, 10 January: The eruption of the Thera volcano (for the fourth time in the century) causes the evacuation of the island.
- 1950, 9 December: Greece participates with the Korean War in favor of South Korea. By the end of the war during 1953, 194 Greek soldiers will be killed.
- 1952, 18 February: Greece and Turkey become members of NATO.
- 1953, August: The 7.2 M_{s} Ionian earthquake shakes the southern Ionian Islands with a maximum Mercalli intensity of X (Extreme). Between 445 and 800 people were killed.
- 1954, 30 April: Sofades is struck by an earthquake. 25 people die.
- 1955, 6–7 September: The Istanbul Pogrom, directed primarily against the city's 100,000-strong Greek minority, occurs. A total of 16 Greeks are killed, while many others are severely wounded, raped and circumcised by mobs. Thousands of Greek-owned buildings are badly damaged or destroyed, accelerating emigration of ethnic Greeks from the city.
- 1955, 4 October: Prime Minister Alexandros Papagos, Greek Civil War general, dies. Konstantinos Karamanlis becomes the new Prime Minister shortly after.
- 1956: Failed coup against King Paul I by a group of colonels.
- 1956, 9 July: The 7.7 M_{w} Amorgos earthquake shakes the Cyclades island group in the Aegean Sea with a maximum Mercalli intensity of IX (Violent). The shaking and the destructive tsunami that followed left fifty-three people dead. A damaging M7.2 aftershock occurred minutes after the mainshock.
- 1959: The Merten affair challenges Greek politics.
- 1963, 27 May: Assassination of politician Gregoris Lambrakis.
- 1963, 17 June: Konstantinos Karamanlis resigns the premiership after a disagreement with King Paul.
- 1963, November: The Center Union party under George Papandreou wins the elections. Karamanlis is self-exiled in Paris.
- 1964, 6 March: The royal government announces the death of King Paul. Rumors circulate in Athens that in fact he had died several days earlier. He is succeeded by his son Constantine II.
- 1964: The Ankara government reneges on the 1930 Greco-Turkish Ankara Convention. Deported with two days' notice, the Greek community of Istanbul shrunk from 100,000 persons in 1955 to only 48,000 in 1965.
- 1965, 15 July: Royal Coup, involving King Constantine II and a group of politicians, known as Iouliana. Premier George Papandreou is forced to resign.
- 1966, 7 December: Ferry SS Heraklion sinks in the Mirtoon Sea. 247 people lose their lives in the worst shipwreck of postwar Greece.
- 1966–1980: About 160,000 Greeks emigrated to the USA.

== Military dictatorship (1967–1974) ==
- 1967, 21 April: Successful coup d'état led by a group of colonels.
- 1968: Counter-coup organized by King Constantine II fails. Constantine II leaves the country.
- 1968, 13 August: Assassination attempt against Dictator Papadopoulos by Alexandros Panagoulis.
- 1968, 1 November: George Papandreou dies. His funeral becomes the occasion for a large anti-dictatorship demonstration.
- 1971: Halki seminary, Orthodoxy's most prominent theological school, is closed by the Turkish government. Despite international pressure for its reopening, it remains closed ever since.
- 1972, 2 March: Ecclesiastical coup in Cyprus fails to remove Makarios from the Presidency.
- 1973, 1 June: Dictator George Papadopoulos declares Greece a republic and himself President, thus deposing King Constantine II via abolishing the monarchy.
- 1973, 17 November: End of the Athens Polytechnic uprising. A total of 24 civilians and students are killed.
- 1973, 25 November: Military coup by General Dimitrios Ioannides ousts Papadopoulos. Military law is reinstated.
- 1974, 15 July: The Greek regime sponsors a coup d'état in Nicosia, replacing President Makarios III with Nikos Sampson.
- 1974, 20 July: Turkey invades Cyprus.
- 1974, 23 July: Nikos Sampson is removed from office and replaced with Glafkos Klerides. The coup regime ends. A general ceasefire is declared.
- 1974, 23 July: Junta-appointed President Phaedon Gizikis calls a meeting of old guard politicians with the participation of the commanders of the armed forces. Konstantinos Karamanlis is chosen to assume the premiership.

== Third Hellenic Republic (1974–today) ==
- 1974, 24 July: Constantine Karamanlis returns with the French Presidential jet. Democracy in Athens is restored.
- 1974, 14 August: Second phase of the Attila Operation in Cyprus. The Turkish forces advance capturing the 37% of the island. A total of about 3,000 are killed or missing. Another 200,000 become refugees.
- 1974, 14 August: Greece withdraws its forces from NATO's military command structure, as a result of the Turkish invasion of Cyprus.
- 1974, 8 September: TWA Flight 841 crashes into the Ionian Sea. All 79 passengers and 9 crew members are killed.
- 1974: Makarios returns as President in Cyprus.
- 1974, 13 December: With a national referendum, the monarchy is not restored and a parliamentary republic is established.
- 1974, 18 December: President pro tempore Phaedon Gizikis is replaced by Michail Stasinopoulos, the first duly elected President of the Third Hellenic Republic.
- 1975, August: Greek junta trials.
- 1977, 3 August: Cypriot President Makarios dies unexpectedly of heart failure.
- 1978, 20 June: The 6.2 M_{w} Thessaloniki earthquake shakes Northern Greece with a maximum Mercalli intensity of IX (Violent). Fifty people were killed.
- 1980: Greek forces are readmitted into NATO.
- 1981, 1 January: Greece joins the European Community.
- 1981, 24 February: A strong earthquake strikes Athens and Corinth, resulting in 20 deaths.
- 1981, 21 October: Andreas Papandreou becomes Greece's first socialist Premier.
- 1986, 2 April: TWA Flight 840 is bombed on the way to Athens, sucking out 4 people aboard; the plane lands safely.
- 1986, 13 September: The Kalamata earthquake causes much damage and kills 20 people.
- 1987, March: The 1987 Aegean Crisis. Premier Andreas Papandreou orders the ship to be sunk if found within Greek waters.
- 1989: Political crisis due to numerous corruption scandals (see Koskotas scandal and Yugoslav corn scandal) and Premier Andreas Papandreou changed the electoral law to prevent the opposition from coming to power, leading to a series of elections in which no party secured a substantial percentage of the popular vote.
- 1989: 27 June: Conservative New Democracy and radical left Synaspismos form a government with a limited mandate to investigate PASOK's corruption scandals that became known as "catharsis."
- 1989, 3 August: Flight 330 of the Olympic Airways from Thessaloniki to Samos crashes in the Kerketeus range. All 34 people aboard were killed.
- 1989, 26 September: Greek liberal politician Pavlos Bakoyannis and architect of the collaboration between left and right wings for Andreas Papandreou indictment is assassinated by the terrorist group N17 (November 17).
- 1989, 27 September: The Hellenic Parliament indicted Premier Andreas Papandreou and four of his ministers for the Koskotas scandal.
- 1989, 23 November: Xenophon Zolotas agrees to serve as interim non-party Premier, until new elections can be instituted.
- 1990, 11 April: Konstantinos Mitsotakis becomes Prime Minister, after his New Democracy party wins the elections.
- 1991, 5 February: The worst accident in the history of the Hellenic Air Force. Lockheed C-130H Hercules 748 crashes into Mount Othrys. 63 people are reported killed.
- 1991, 8 September: The Macedonia naming dispute arises, after the declaration of independence of the Republic of Macedonia.
- 1992, January: After a "special court" trial, Andreas Papandreou is cleared of the charges resulting from the Koskotas scandal.
- 1992, 3 July: The adoption of a flag incorporating the Vergina Sun by the Republic of Macedonia, increases tensions between the two countries.
- 1993, 13 October: Andreas Papandreou's Panhellenic Socialist Movement (PASOK) wins the general elections.
- 1994, 16 February: Greece imposes an embargo on the Republic of Macedonia.
- 1994, 6 March: Greek actress, singer, political activist of the anti-dictatoric struggle and Minister of Culture Melina Mercouri dies of cancer. She receives an elaborate state funeral, which is attended by hundreds of thousands of people.
- 1995, 13 May: Grevena and Kozani are struck by an earthquake. Several villages are destroyed and hundreds of people are left homeless.
- 1995, 15 June: An earthquake shatters Aigio. 26 people are reported dead.
- 1995, November: Greece ends the embargo that had imposed on the Republic of Macedonia, after the later's decision to change its flag and controversial articles of its constitution.
- 1996, 16 January: Andreas Papandreou, hospitalized with advanced heart disease and kidney failure since November 1995, retires from office.
- 1996, 18 January: Costas Simitis is elected Premier.
- 1996, 31 January: The Imia/Kardak crisis. Greece and Turkey are brought to the brink of war. A Greek military helicopter crashes in the area, killing the three pilots aboard. Later a Turkish F-16 was shot down by a Greek mirage-2000 over the Aegean, killing its pilot Nail Erdogan and the co-pilot bailing out.
- 1996, 23 June: Andreas Papandreou dies. His funeral procession produces a great outpouring of public emotion.
- 1996, 23 July: Greece's national actress Aliki Vougiouklaki dies after short illness. Her funeral is attended by hundreds of thousands of people.
- 1996, 11, 14 August: During demonstrations in Cyprus, activists Tassos Isaac and Solomos Solomou are murdered by members of the Grey Wolves.
- 1997, 17 December: Yakovlev Yak-42 of the Aerosvit Airlines crashes into the Pierian mountains in Central Macedonia. The exact spot of the crash was discovered 3 days later, because of the bad weather conditions and the mountainous landscape. 70 people are killed.
- 1997, 20 December: Lockheed Hercules C-130 of the Hellenic Air Force crashes into Pastra Mountain near Tanagra, cause of bad weather conditions, killing 5 people. The military aircraft was due to transfer soldiers from Tanagra to Pieria, in order to participate with the operations for the discovery of the Ukrainian plane which had crashed 3 days earlier.
- 1998, 23 April: Konstantinos Karamanlis, four-time prime minister and two-time president of Greece, who shaped most of post-WWII politics, dies.
- 1999, 17 August: Powerful earthquakes strike the Turkish city of İzmit. Greece is the first foreign country to pledge aid to Turkey.
- 1999, 7 September: Athens is struck by the most devastating earthquake in Greece of the past 20 years. A total of 145 people die. The Turkish aid is the first to arrive. The two earthquakes initiate the Greek–Turkish earthquake diplomacy.
- 2000, 26 September: Passenger ferry MS Express Samina sinks near the island of Paros. 80 of the over 500 passengers are lost at sea.
- 2001, 1 January: Greece voted to adopt the Euro.
- 2001, 4 May: Pope John Paul II visits Athens and makes apologies for the sins of the Crusader attack on Constantinople in 1204.
- 2001, 11 September: 33 Greek Americans lose their lives in the September 11 attacks. The St. Nicholas Greek Orthodox Church is completely buried by the collapse of the South Tower.
- 2002, December: Murder attempt against Dora Bakoyannis.
- 2004, 24 April: In a referendum, Greek Cypriots reject the Annan Plan whereas Turkish Cypriots accept it.
- 2004, 1 May: Cyprus becomes a member of the European Union.
- 2004, 4 July: Greece wins the UEFA Euro Cup in Portugal
- 2004, 13–29 August: Athens hosts the 2004 Summer Olympics.
- 2004, 11 September: The helicopter carrying Patriarch Peter VII of Alexandria along with 16 others (including journalists and three other bishops of the Church of Alexandria) crashes into the Aegean Sea while en route to the monastic community of Mount Athos, arguably after an explosion. None survived. The cause of the crash remains unknown.
- 2005, 14 August: After fears that it could crash in Athens' center, Helios Airways Flight 522 crashes in Grammatiko, killing all 121 people aboard. This was the deadliest aviation accident in the history of Greece.
- 2006, 18–20 May: Athens hosts the Eurovision Song Contest 2006.
- 2006, 7 July: Death of Roger Milliex, great philhellene, academic, author, former Director of the French Institute of Athens and avid supporter of France–Greece relations.
- 2007, June through September: Western Peloponnese and southern Euboea are ravaged by lethal infernos.
- 2008, 6 December: riots and protest begin.
- 2009, 21–25 August: Attica is ravaged by wildfires.
- 2010: European debt crisis; the country's stability has been interrupted; many demonstrations occur in Athens (May 2010 Greek protests) while many workers went on strike; the country is on the verge of a new wave of emigration, with young college graduates at the forefront.
- 2010, 14–15 May: The Prime Minister of Turkey, Recep Tayyip Erdoğan, visits Greece along with 10 ministers; 21 agreements – memoranda of cooperation between the two countries' ministries were signed.
- 2015, 5 July: 2015 Greek bailout referendum
- 2018, 23–23 July: Attica wildfires; 104 confirmed dead.
- 2019, 8 July: Kyriakos Mitsotakis becomes Prime Minister.
- 2020, 26 February: The first COVID-19 case in Greece.
- 2023, 28 February: Tempi train crash; a head-on collision occurred between two trains south of the Tempi Valley leaves 57 dead and 81 heavily injured.

== See also ==
- History of modern Greece
- Years in Greece
- Timeline of Orthodoxy in Greece
- Timeline of ancient Greece
- Timeline of Indo-Greek Kingdoms
- Timeline of Athens
