= Nebahat Güçlü =

Turkish-German politician

Nebahat Güçlü (* 10 September 1965 in Kayseri, Turkey) is a German politician (SPD, formerly Alliance 90/The Greens). She was a member of the Hamburg Parliament from 2004 to 2010 and again from 2015 to 2020, serving as its vice president from 2008 to 2010. In April 2015, following a controversial appearance before a Turkish nationalist organization, she left the Greens and joined the SPD in August 2018.

== Life ==
Güçlü moved to Hamburg in 1970 and, after graduating from the Lohmühlen Gymnasium in 1986, studied German Studies and Political Science at the University of Hamburg until 1991. She is divorced, has one daughter, and has been a German citizen since 1995.

From 1986 to 1993, she worked as a social worker at the International Women's Meeting Center INCI e.V., and from 1993 to 1999, she headed its social services department. From 2000 to 2010, she was the managing director of the Intercultural Meeting Center (IKB). V. and from 2011 to 2015, she was a project manager at the German Parity Welfare Association (Deutscher Paritätischer Wohlfahrtsverband), providing advice and support to migrant organizations.

From March 2004 to April 2010, she served in the Hamburg Parliament (Hamburgische Bürgerschaft) for the Green Party. Within the parliamentary group, she was the spokesperson for migration, refugees, and foreigners. On May 29, 2008, she was elected Vice President of the Hamburg Parliament. On April 15, 2010, she resigned her seat for personal reasons, thereby also stepping down as vice president.

From 2012 to 2017, Güçlü chaired the Turkish Community of Hamburg and Surrounding Areas.

In the 2015 Hamburg state election, Güçlü won a seat in the Hamburg Parliament (Hamburgische Bürgerschaft) with 5,536 personal votes via the Green Party's state list. Following controversy surrounding a speech she gave before a Turkish nationalist organization, the Green Party parliamentary group was formed without Güçlü. On April 1, 2015, she announced her resignation from the party. She subsequently served as an independent member of parliament. She is no longer a member of the parliament elected in 2020.

In August 2018, she joined the SPD (Social Democratic Party of Germany).

On Facebook, Güçlü herself announced that she had already resigned from the SPD on November 17, 2023. She cited the German government's policy towards Israel as one of the reasons for her decision. In her resignation statement, which Güçlü published on Facebook, she wrote: "Over 70 years of apartheid, ethnic cleansing, settlement expansion, and other factors have led to this conflict."

== Criticism ==
In 2005, Güçlü accused the Islam-critical sociologist and author Necla Kelek of "exaggeration," arguing that "honor killings have nothing to do with Turkish-Islamic identity." Kelek has merely "discovered a market niche and wants to make money off it." In a commentary in the Hamburger Abendblatt in May 2008, following an "honor killing" in Hamburg, Kelek stated: "Today she talks completely differently and acts as if she had already discovered the issue in 2005, and presents herself as the savior of those forced into marriage." However, Kelek overlooks the fact that Güçlü, for example, in an opinion piece for the Hamburger Abendblatt on April 2, 2005, entitled "Outlaw Forced Marriage!", denounced the trivialization of "violence against women, forced marriage, and honor killings" and demanded improved protection for those affected. Previously, on March 24, 2005, she had submitted a minor inquiry to the Hamburg Senate on this topic and in June 2005 a corresponding motion to the Hamburg Parliament.

On January 18, 2015, Güçlü appeared as a speaker at an event of the Federation of Turkish-Democratic Idealist Associations in Germany (ADÜTDF) in Hamburg. The association forms the main platform of the Grey Wolves in Germany and has been listed in the Federal Office for the Protection of the Constitution's report on foreign extremism since 2004. According to her own statement, Güçlü was unaware of who was behind the ADÜTDF, especially since the invitation had only been verbal. Despite criticism from associations and the party leadership, Güçlü refused to withdraw her candidacy, which was ranked 25th on the state list for the 2015 Hamburg state election. As a result, the Hamburg Green Party's state executive committee initiated expulsion proceedings against her, which were decided by the state arbitration court. At the end of March, the court ruled against her expulsion.

At the end of March 2015, the German Parity Welfare Association in Hamburg terminated Güçlü's employment as a migration policy advisor, effective at the end of April, without giving a reason.

Güçlü had been working for the umbrella organization of independent welfare services since June 2011, advising and supporting migrant self-help organizations. She filed a lawsuit against the decision, seeking protection against dismissal. The proceedings ended with a settlement.

In the fall of 2016, she was criticized for her contacts with the chairman of the Osmanen Germania Hamburg.
