= Isgandar Hamidov =

Azerbaijani politician (1948–2020)

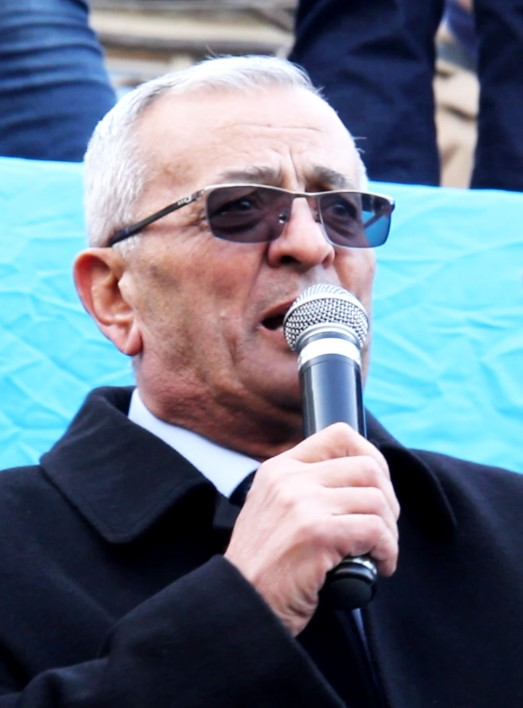
Hamidov in 2019

Isgandar Majid oglu Hamidov (Azerbaijani: İsgəndər Məcid oğlu Həmidov) (also transliterated as Iskender Majid oglu Hamidov or Iskander Medjid oglu Hamidov; April 10, 1948 in Bağlıpəyə village, Kalbajar rayon – February 26, 2020 in Baku) was an Azerbaijani politician, Minister of Internal Affairs of Azerbaijan who served in the Popular Front government of 1992–1993. He was a nationalist and anti-communist. He played a key role in preventing Ayaz Mutallibov's 1992 self-coup.

When Ayaz Mutallibov, first president of Azerbaijan, cancelled presidential elections which were set to take place on June 7, 1992, Hamidov marched with an armed force to confront Mutallibov. Mutallibov subsequently fled the country and Isa Gambar was made acting president. Gambar reinstated the upcoming presidential elections which were won by Abulfaz Elchibey.

As Minister of Internal Affairs, Hamidov sought to clamp down on the black market in Azerbaijan. Isgandar Hamidov resigned in April 1993.

As a chairman of Azerbaijan National Democrat Party, informally known as the Grey Wolves, Hamidov pleaded for the creation of a unified Turkic country which would include northern Iran and extend itself to Siberia, India and China. He was known to have threatened Armenia with a nuclear strike. He had also supported Chechnya in the First Chechen war as part of the Grey Wolves and played a major role in the First Nagorno-Karabakh war.

Historian Audrey Altstadt writes of Hamidov's military tenure,

Compared with the many men who had given themselves the title of “colonel” after building a private army with the accumulated bribes of theirSoviet-era jobs, Hamidov had earned his living and his rank. He had the paramilitary training of the regular police and through years of service had achieved the rank of colonel. He commanded the personal loyalty of thousands of willing fighters.

In 1995, he was arrested and sentenced to 14 years in prison by the Heydar Aliyev regime for embezzlement of state funds. According to Amnesty International and the Council of Europe, he was a political prisoner. He was pardoned by the decree of President Ilham Aliyev in 2004.

He died in April 10, 2020, he was 72.
