= Adana Alparslan Türkeş Science and Technology University =

Public university in Adana, Turkey

Coordinates: 37.0058°N 35.2501°E

- Adana Alparslan Türkeş Bilim ve Teknoloji Üniversitesi
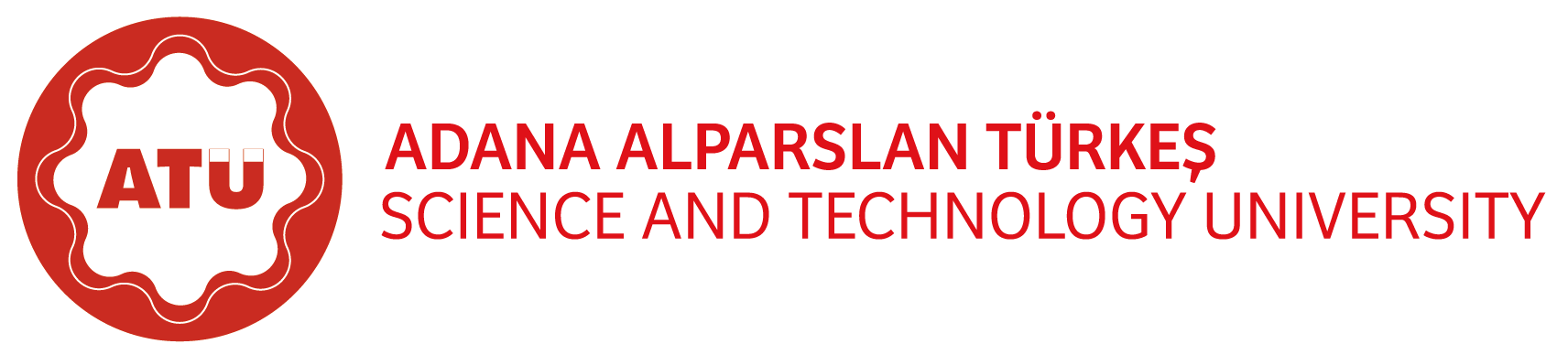
- Established: 2011
- Rector: Mehmet Tümay
- Location: Adana, Turkey
- Website: atu.edu.tr

Adana Alparslan Türkeş Science and Technology University (ATU) is a public university located in Adana, Turkey. It was named after Alparslan Türkeş, a Turkish politician.

The university is focused on both scientific research and education in engineering and natural sciences.
