= Grey Wolves training camps =

Training camps used by Turkish nationalist Grey Wolves

Grey Wolves training camps were camps for ideological and paramilitary training that were established by Alparslan Türkeş. The camps specialised in providing urban warfare training to members of the Grey Wolves. The camps were founded in 1968 and fully dissolved by 1978. As part of Operation Gladio, the United States funded and sent weapons to the camps, and the trainers at the camps were TSK veterans who had also received training from the United States beforehand. The first session started on July 14, 1968, in the cities of İzmir, and Gümüldere. By 1969, over 100,000 people were trained at the camps. The camps grew to 35 by the end of 1970. There were a total of over 100 camps across Turkey, in cities such as İzmir, Yozgat, Çankırı, Kayseri, Trabzon, Antalya, Ankara, and Istanbul. The soldiers were described as being "well-disciplined", and after graduating from the camps, they had fought in the Turkish political conflict and were involved in shootouts, assassinations, and other attacks against leftists, Alevis, Kurds, and Islamists.
