= Killing of Solomos Solomou =

1996 killing of a Greek Cypriot by Turkish forces in the Cyprus UN buffer zone

Solomou after being shot

Solomon Solomou (Greek: Σολομών Σολωμού; 1970 – 14 August 1996) was a Greek Cypriot who was shot and killed by a Turkish officer while trying to climb a flagpole in order to remove a Turkish flag from its mast in Cyprus's United Nations Buffer Zone. The killing occurred in the aftermath of the funeral of Solomou's cousin Tassos Isaac, who had been murdered a few days earlier by Turkish nationalists belonging to the militant Grey Wolves organization.

== Early life ==
Solomou was originally from the town of Famagusta, which fell under the control of the Turkish military as a result of the Turkish invasion of 1974. Like hundreds of thousands of other Cypriots, Solomou and his family became internally displaced persons. They fled to the nearby town of Paralimni, where he grew up with other Greek-Cypriot refugees.

== Incident ==
Following the funeral of Tassos Isaac, who was beaten to death by a crowd of Grey Wolves (Turkish nationalists) in the United Nations Buffer Zone three days earlier, a group of Greek Cypriots returned to the area to continue the protest. Among these demonstrators was Solomou, a second cousin of Isaac. At around 2:20 pm, Solomou distanced himself from the rest of the demonstrators and walked towards a Turkish military post in Deryneia. Ignoring Turkish soldiers' many warnings, Solomou climbed a flagpole with the intention of replacing its Turkish flag with a Greek flag, but was shot by the soldiers. After his death, Turkish soldiers let UN soldiers take his body from the buffer zone to return it to his family.

The whole scene was taped by nearby journalists and was seen on live television. Solomou's funeral was held on 16 August in Paralimni, attended by thousands of people with an official day of mourning. A few days after the incident, Greek Prime Minister Costas Simitis visited Cyprus; together with Cypriot President Glafcos Clerides, he visited the homes of the families of Isaac and Solomou. Turkish Foreign Minister (and later Turkish Prime Minister) Tansu Çiller, who also visited Cyprus a few days after the incident, addressed a rally by saying that Turks would "break the hands" of anyone who insulted their flag.

== Identification of killers ==
According to Cyprus Police, Solomou's killers were identified using photographic evidence as Minister of Agriculture and Natural Resources of Northern Cyprus Kenan Akin and Chief of Special Forces of Northern Cyprus Erdal Haciali Emanet. Warrants were issued by the Republic of Cyprus for the arrest of Akin, Emanet, and three others: Chief of Police of Northern Cyprus Attila Sav, Lt. Gen. of the Turkish Cypriot Security Force Hasan Kundakçı, and Maj. Gen. of the Turkish Army Mehmet Karlı. In October 2004, Akin, wanted by Interpol for the murder of Solomou, said the former Turkish Military Commander Halil Sadrazam had given the order to shoot. Sadrazam denied the accusation. Akin was later arrested in Istanbul on unrelated smuggling charges. Due to the fact that under the Turkish law so called "Greek Administration of Southern Cyprus" does not have jurisdiction over so called "Turkish Republic of Northern Cyprus" Akin was released by Turkish authorities despite being wanted for murder by Interpol, which prompted a question on Turkey's judicial cooperation by Dimitrios Papadimoulis of the European Parliament.

== Aftermath ==
The photo of Solomou climbing the Turkish flagpole has often been used as symbol of protest against Turkey's invasion of northern Cyprus. Solomou was praised by a number of Greek politicians, and several prominent Greek composers and singers dedicated their songs to him. Dionysis Savvopoulos dedicated "Odi sto Georgio Karaiskaki" ("Ode to Georgio Karaiskaki"), Dimitris Mitropanos and Thanos Mikroutsikos dedicated "Panta gelastoi" ("Always Smiling"), and Stelios Rokkos dedicated "Gia to Solomo Solomou" ("For Solomo Solomou"). The 2009 Notis Sfakianakis song "Itan trellos" ("He Was Crazy") directly deals with Solomou's death and the ongoing Turkish occupation of Cyprus.

Solomou is considered a national hero in Greece and Cyprus, where he is often referred to as a "hero-martyr" (Greek: ηρωομάρτυρας). On 24 June 2008, the European Court of Human Rights ruled in favour of Solomou's family in the case of Solomou and others v. Turkey.
