= Azerbaijan National Democrat Party =

Azerbaijan National Democrat Party Azərbaycan Milli Demokrat Partiyası
- Abbreviation: AzMDEP
- Leader: Isgandar Hamidov
- Founded: 1993
- Dissolved: 14 April 2023
- Ideology: Azerbaijani nationalism Pan-Turkism
- Regional affiliation: Grey Wolves

Party flag

The Azerbaijan National Democrat Party (Azerbaijani: Milli Demokrat İdrak Partiyası), formerly known as the Grey Wolves Party, was a political party in Azerbaijan. It was the branch of the Grey Wolves in Azerbaijan. Isgandar Hamidov, a party member, was the Minister of Internal Affairs of Azerbaijan of the Azerbaijan Popular Front Party government. The party was banned in 1995 and Hamidov imprisoned; however, the party is again functioning today after being re-established in 2004 and registered in 2008 with Hamidov as the party leader. The party was known for its fiery nationalist rhetoric and favoring a military solution to the Nagorno-Karabakh conflict.

The party released a statement announcing its dissolution on 14 April 2023.
