= Ayyüce Türkeş Taş =

Turkish politician (born 1977)

Ayyüce Türkeş Taş MP

Member of the Grand National Assembly
- Incumbent
- Assumed office 2 June 2023
- Constituency: Adana (2023)

Personal details
- Born: 2 October 1977 (age 49) Ankara, Turkey
- Party: Good Party
- Spouse: Egemen Taş
- Relations: Alparslan Türkeş (father)
- Children: 2
- Education: Bilkent University; Bilgi University; Marmara University
- Occupation: Politician
- Profession: Economist

Ayyüce Türkeş Taş (born 2 October 1977) is a Turkish economist and politician. She is the daughter of Alparslan Türkeş and Member of Parliament from Adana.

== Education ==
Born in Ankara, Türkeş had both her primary and high school education in the same city. She obtained her first degree in economics from Bilkent University and completed her masters of business administration degree from Bilgi University, She has a doctorate degree in Banking from Marmara University.

== Career ==
From 2010, she spent time working as an economist and banking expert in New York before returning to Turkey for a political career. She criticized the current leadership of the MHP, party founded by her father and argued that they do not represent the original ideology anymore.

Taş became a nominee for the İYİ Party in the 2023 Turkish general election. She was elected and became one of the 15 Adana deputies at the Grand National Assembly of Turkey.

Taş was a candidate for the mayorship of Adana for the İYİ Party in the 2024 local elections, but did not win the post, obtaining only 4.24% of the votes.

== Family ==
Türkeş, daughter of Alparslan Türkeş, founder of the Nationalist Movement Party married Egemen Taş, a computer engineer in 2012, and a mother of two daughters. She is the stepsister to Yıldırım Tuğrul Türkeş, a former deputy prime minister of Turkey.
