= Killing of Tassos Isaac =

1996 killing of a Greek Cypriot refugee by Turkish nationalists during a protest

Anastasios "Tassos" Isaac (Greek: Αναστάσιος "Τάσος" Ισαάκ; 1972 – 11 August 1996), was a Greek Cypriot refugee who participated in a civilian demonstration against the Turkish invasion of Cyprus. The demonstrators' demand was for the complete withdrawal of Turkish troops from the northern part of the island, and the return of Cypriot refugees to their homes. Isaac was beaten to death by a gathering of Turkish nationalists of the Grey Wolves in the United Nations Buffer Zone in Cyprus.

Tassos Isaac beaten to death by Grey Wolves.

== Events leading to the killing ==
In August 1996, in order to commemorate the 22nd year of Cyprus being a divided country, over 200 bikers from several European countries had organised a rally from Berlin (the last divided city in Europe other than Nicosia) to Kyrenia. They left Berlin on 2 August and were planning to arrive at their destination on the 11th where they would be joined by Greek Cypriot bikers. Simultaneously, around 2,500 members of the Turkish organisation Grey Wolves were being transported to the northern part of Cyprus by the Turkish Government in order to confront the European and Greek Cypriot bikers.

Due to heavy political pressure (even by the U.N. Secretary General Boutros Boutros-Ghali) being applied to the Cypriot Motorcycle Federation to cancel the 11 August event, CMF finally succumbed. This was met with disapproval by a large portion of the bikers and other protesters, who decided to march on their own. Among them was Tassos Isaac, who together with other demonstrators, entered the United Nations Buffer Zone in Cyprus near Deryneia, just south of the town of Famagusta.

During the confrontation in the UN buffer zone between the Cypriot bikers and the Turkish group Grey Wolves, Isaac found himself trapped in barbed-wire without his co-protesters noticing he was left behind. Soon, a large group of Grey Wolves members ran towards him and began beating him with clubs and stones. They continued for several minutes, unchallenged by the nearby UN peacekeepers or Turkish Cypriot police officers watching the beating, with some of the latter also partaking in the attack. By the time Greek Cypriots managed to take him back from the mob, aided by the UN peacekeepers, Isaac was dead.

== Funeral and reactions ==
Isaac's funeral was held on 14 August 1996 and was attended by thousands of people. Protests after the funeral led to the death of Isaac's cousin, Solomos Solomou.

On 22 November 1996, the Cypriot Police issued international arrest warrants for the murder of Isaac against: Hasim Yilmaz, a Turkish settler and former member of the Turkish Secret Service; Neyfel Mustafa Ergun, a Turkish settler serving in the Turkish North Cypriot police; Polat Fikret Koreli, a Turkish Cypriot from Famagusta; Mehmet Mustafa Arslan, a Turkish settler and leader of the Grey Wolves in Northern Cyprus; and Erhan Arıklı, a Turkish settler from the former Soviet Union.

Until 2012, the only arrested was Erhan Arıklı, in Kyrgyzstan on the basis of an international Interpol warrant. Cyprus requested his extradition, but after Turkey intervened, he was released and the extradition did not take place. He eventually became a politician in Northern Cyprus. As of 2026, he was the Minister of Transport and Public Works of the local administration. He was never convicted for Isaac's death.

== Greek government as godparent ==
When Isaac was killed, he left behind his pregnant wife. As a token of gratitude for his services to Greece, the Greek government decided to be the godparent of the yet unborn baby. When the baby girl was born, she was baptised Anastasia (after her father) by the then Greek Minister of Foreign Affairs Theodoros Pangalos. The Greek singer Haris Alexiou has dedicated to her the song "Tragoudi tou Helidhoniou" ("Swallow's Song").
