= Osmanen Germania =

Osmanen Germania BC
- Founded: Between late 2014 and April 2015
- Founding location: Germany
- Years active: 2014–2018
- Territory: Germany
- Ethnicity: Turkish
- Membership: 300 members (at the time of dissolution)
- Activities: Organized crime, Assault, Blackmail, Prostitution, Kidnapping, Narcotics, Gun crime, Intimidation
- Allies: AKP, Grey Wolves
- Rivals: Bahoz (Kurdish gang)

Osmanen Germania or Osmanen Germania BC (OGBC) was a Turkish-nationalistic and extreme right criminal gang in Germany. It was formed some time between late 2014 and April 2015 and banned by the Federal Ministry of the Interior under Horst Seehofer in 2018.

The gang was said to be financially supported by the Turkish ruling party AKP and Turkish president Recep Tayyip Erdoğan. It had connections to the neo-fascist Grey Wolves.

Investigators from German security authorities have accused the Ottoman Germania of attacks and violent intimidation against left-wing Turks, Kurdish critics of President Erdoğan and the Gülen movement. Their activities are attributed to organized crime. According to Bundestag member Ulla Jelpke (Left), members of the Ottomans appeared as security guards at demonstrations by the right-wing extremist Gray Wolves. There were also numerous violent clashes with the Kurdish-rooted Bahoz, which was also structured like a rocker gang.

== Structure ==
At the time of its dissolution, it had 16 chapters and 300 members. According to authorities in North Rhine-Westphalia, the gang had connections with the Turkish government party AKP and Turkish president Recep Tayyip Erdoğan. Several members of the OGBC have connections to the neo-fascist Grey Wolves organisation. The OGBC were in involved in conflicts with the "Kurdish-friendly" gang Bahoz and also in internal fighting between OGBC chapters.

In the state of Baden-Württemberg its activities involved attempted murder, assault, blackmailing, prostitution, kidnapping as well as narcotics and gun crime.

In 2016, OGBC members received pay from the German government to guard refugee centres during the European migrant crisis.

Some of the court proceedings against OGBC members took place in the high security premises of Stammheim Prison.
