= Grey Wolves (organization) =

Turkish far-right political organization

Idealist Hearths Educational and Cultural Foundation
- Ülkü Ocakları Eğitim ve Kültür Vakfı
- Founder: Alparslan Türkeş
- Leader: Ahmet Yiğit Yıldırım
- Dates active: 1968–present
- Country: Turkey, Turkic countries
- Headquarters: Ankara
- Active regions: Turkey, Northern Cyprus, Western Europe, Syria, Central Asia, Azerbaijan, Chechen Republic of Ichkeria
- Ideology: Turkish ultranationalism Turkish-Islamic synthesis Turkic supremacism Neo-fascism; Pan-Turkism; Turanism; National conservatism Xenophobia Anti-communism
- Political position: Far-right
- Status: Active; the Grey Wolves have been banned from Azerbaijan in 1995, Kazakhstan in 2005 and France in 2020.
- Size: Turkey: 3.2% of the population are supporters (2021); Germany: 7,000 (2015) to 18,000+ (2017)
- Part of: Nationalist Movement Party

The Grey Wolves (Turkish: Bozkurtlar), officially known as Idealist Hearths (Turkish: Ülkü Ocakları, [ylcy odʒakɫaɾɯ]), is a Turkish far-right political movement and the youth wing of the Nationalist Movement Party (MHP). Commonly described as ultranationalist, neo-fascist, Islamo-nationalist (sometimes secular), and racist, the Grey Wolves have been described by some scholars, journalists, and governments as a death squad and a terrorist organization. Its members deny its political nature and claim it to be a cultural and educational foundation, citing its full official name, Idealist Hearths Educational and Cultural Foundation (Turkish: Ülkü Ocakları Eğitim ve Kültür Vakfı).

Established by Colonel Alparslan Türkeş in the late 1960s, the Grey Wolves rose to prominence during the late 1970s political violence in Turkey when its members engaged in urban guerrilla warfare with left-wing militants and activists. Scholars hold it responsible for most of the violence and killings in this period, including the Maraş massacre in December 1978, which killed over 100 Alevis. They are also alleged to have been behind the Taksim Square massacre in May 1977, and to have played a role in the Kurdish–Turkish conflict from 1978 onwards. The attempted assassination of Pope John Paul II in 1981 by Grey Wolves member Mehmet Ali Ağca was never formally linked to Grey Wolves leaders, and the organization's role remains unclear.

The organization has long been a prominent suspect in investigations into the deep state in Turkey, and is suspected of having close dealings in the past with the Counter-Guerrilla, the Turkish branch of the NATO Operation Gladio, as well as the Turkish mafia. Among the Grey Wolves' prime targets are non-Turkish ethnic minorities such as Kurds, Greeks, and Armenians, and leftist activists.

A staunchly pan-Turkist organization, in the early 1990s the Grey Wolves extended their area of operation into the post-Soviet states with Turkic and Muslim populations. Up to thousands of its members fought in the First Nagorno-Karabakh War on the Azerbaijani side, and the First and Second Chechen–Russian Wars on the Chechen side. After an unsuccessful attempt to seize power in Azerbaijan in 1995, they were banned in that country. In 2005, Kazakhstan also banned the organization, classifying it as a terrorist group.

The organization is also active in Northern Cyprus, and has affiliated branches in Western European nations with a significant Turkish diaspora such as Germany, Belgium and the Netherlands. They are the largest right-wing extremist organization in Germany. The Grey Wolves were banned in France in November 2020 for hate speech and political violence, and calls for similar actions are made elsewhere. In May 2021, the European Parliament also called on member states of the European Union to designate it as a terrorist group. In 2025, the U.S. Court of Appeals for the Third Circuit designated the Grey Wolves as a Tier III terrorist organization.

While it was characterized as the MHP's paramilitary or militant wing during the 1976–1980 political violence in Turkey, under Devlet Bahçeli, who assumed the leadership of the MHP and Grey Wolves after Türkeş's death in 1997, the organization claims to have reformed. According to a 2021 poll, the Grey Wolves are supported by 3.2% of the Turkish population.

== Name and symbolism ==
The organization's members are known as Ülkücüler, which literally means "idealists". Its informal name is inspired by the ancient legend of Asena, a she-wolf in the Ergenekon, a Tengrist ancient myth associated with Turkic ethnic origins in the Central Asian steppes. In Turkey, the wolf also symbolizes honour. The Grey Wolves have a "strong emphasis on leadership and hierarchical, military-like organisation."

According to scholar Ahmet İnsel, the Grey wolves also use "fascist slogans imported from America", such as "Love it or leave it" (Ya Sev Ya Terk Et!) and "Communists to Moscow" (Komünistler Moskova'ya).

=== Grey Wolves salute ===
The salutation of the Grey Wolves is "a fist with the little finger and index finger raised" Turkic hand gesture, described by founder Alparslan Türkes, as: "The little finger symbolises the Turks, the index finger symbolises Islam, the ring – or snout – symbolises the world. The point where the remaining three fingers [sic.] join is a stamp. It means: we will put the Turkish-Islamic stamp on the world."

It was banned in Austria in February 2019. In Germany, the Christian Democratic Union (CDU) and the Left Party proposed banning the salute in October 2018, calling it fascist.

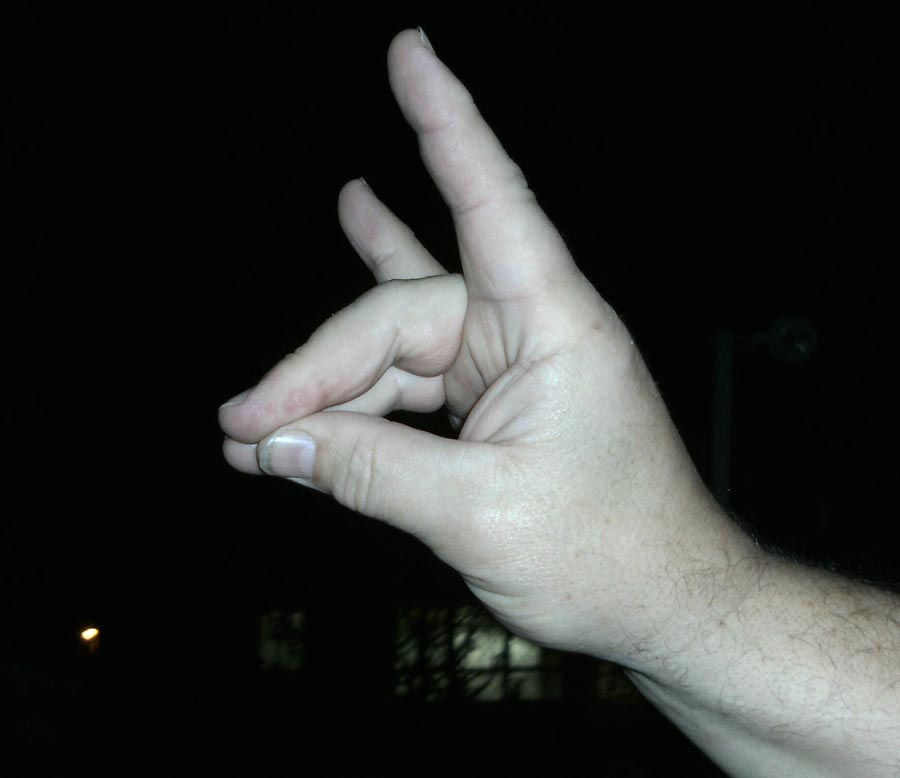
The nationalist Wolf salute, used by the Grey Wolves.

In the 2024 European Football Cup, Turkish player Merih Demiral displayed the "wolf salute" after scoring in Turkey's round of 16 match against Austria. Nancy Faeser, Germany's interior minister, condemned use of the gesture, saying, "To use the football championships as a platform for racism is completely unacceptable", and the Turkish ambassador was summoned to explain. Demiral was banned for two games by UEFA for this reason, prompting protests denouncing the suspension by the Turkish Football Federation and Turkish government officials. Turkish President Recep Tayyip Erdoğan changed plans to visit Azerbaijan to attend the following match after Demiral's suspension to show his support. He had defended the player, saying that he merely expressed his "excitement" after scoring.

A large group of Turkish supporters making their way to the European Championship quarterfinal against the Netherlands made the same nationalistic hand gesture that got Demiral banned from the match, and were dispersed by the police. German authorities believe the group has around 12,100 members in the country. It is monitored by Germany's federal domestic agency. The group has been banned in France, while Austria has banned the use of the Gray Wolf salute.

== Ideology ==
The Grey Wolves adhere to an extreme form of Turkish nationalism. It has been characterized as an ultra-nationalist and neo-fascist paramilitary organization by political scholars, the mainstream media, and left-wing sources. R. W. Apple Jr., writing in The New York Times in 1981, described MHP and its satellite groups as a "xenophobic, fanatically nationalist, neofascist network steeped in violence." The organization's ideology emphasizes the early history of the Turkic peoples in Central Asia and blends it with Islamic culture and beliefs; their synthesis of Turkish identity, political ideology, and Islamic beliefs is referred to as "Turkish Islamonationalism", and is widely prevalent in their rhetoric and activities. One of their mottos is: "Your doctor will be a Turk and your medicine will be Islam." Other sources have described it as secular.

Their ideology is based on a "superiority" of the Turkish "race" and the Turkish nation. According to Peters, they strive for an "ideal" Turkish nation, which they define as "Sunni-Islamic and mono-ethnic: only inhabited by 'true' Turks." A Turk is defined as someone who lives in the Turkish territory, feels Turkish and calls themselves Turkish. In their ideology and activities, they are hostile to virtually all non-Turkish or non-Sunni elements within Turkey, including Kurds, Alevis, Arabs, Armenians, Greeks, Christians, and Jews. They embrace anti-Semitic conspiracy theories such as those put forward by The Protocols of the Elders of Zion, and have distributed the Turkish translation of Adolf Hitler's Mein Kampf.

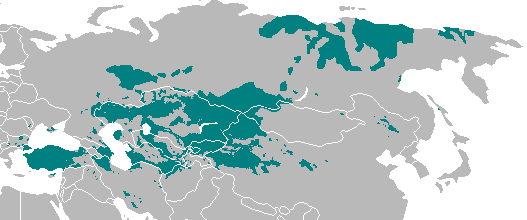
Grey Wolves seek to unite all Turkic peoples. This map shows parts of Eurasia inhabited by Turkic-speaking peoples.

The Grey Wolves are Pan-Turkist and seek to unite the Turkic peoples in one state stretching from the Balkans to Central Asia. After the dissolution of the Soviet Union in 1991, the Grey Wolves called for "a revived Turkish empire embracing newly independent Central Asian states of the former Soviet Union." They have proposed "a pan-Turkish extension of the Turkish nation-state." Due to their pan-Turkic agenda they are hostile towards China, Iran, and Russia.

The Grey Wolves are anti-communist and have a history of violence toward leftists.

== Base ==
According to sociologist Doğu Ergil, the Grey Wolves—"the militant youth wing of the Turkish ethnic nationalists that are dissatisfied with the inertia of the Nationalist Movement Party (MHP) camp"—are supported by 3.6% of the Turkish electorate as of 2014. A 2021 poll by Kadir Has University found that a similar percentage, 3.2% of respondents identify as Ülkücü, or supporters of the Grey Wolves.

According to analyst Ankarali Jan, the Grey Wolves have a largely unofficial presence in Turkey's major universities, but their "real power is on the streets, among disaffected poor people in predominantly Turkish Sunni neighbourhoods." Norm Dixon wrote in the Green Left Weekly in 1999 that the MHP and Grey Wolves "retain strong support within the military." In 2018, Tom Stevenson described it as a "street movement."

== Links to the Turkish government and NATO ==
In the late 1970s, former military prosecutor and Turkish Supreme Court Justice Emin Değer documented collaboration between the Grey Wolves, the Central Intelligence Agency (CIA), and Counter-Guerrilla, the Turkish stay-behind anti-communist organization organized under NATO's Operation Gladio, a plan for guerrilla warfare in case of a communist takeover. Martin Lee writes that the Counter-Guerrilla supplied weapons to the Grey Wolves, while according to Tim Jacoby, the CIA transferred guns and explosives to Grey Wolves units through an agent in the 1970s.

During the 1996 Susurluk scandal, the Grey Wolves were accused of being members of the Counter-Guerrilla. Abdullah Çatlı, second-in-command of the Grey Wolves leadership, was killed during the Susurluk car crash, which sparked the scandal. The April 1997 report of the Turkish National Assembly's investigative committee "offered considerable evidence of close ties between state authorities and criminal gangs, including the use of the Grey Wolves to carry out illegal activities."

In 2008 the Ergenekon trials, a court document revealed that the National Intelligence Organization (MİT) armed and funded Grey Wolves members to carry out political murders. They mostly targeted members of the Armenian Secret Army for the Liberation of Armenia (ASALA), which attacked Turkish embassies abroad in retaliation for the Turkish state's continued denial of the Armenian genocide. The Turkish intelligence services also made use of the Grey Wolves in the Kurdish–Turkish conflict, by offering them amnesty for their crimes in exchange.

In 2018, the AK Party formed an alliance with the MHP which succeeded in re-electing President Erdoğan. In 2022, concerns around the close connections between the Turkish government and the Grey Wolves caused the Foreign Affairs Committee of the European Parliament to recommend that the Grey Wolves be banned in the European Union.

== History ==
According to Ruben Safrastyan, because the Grey Wolves are subtle and often formally operate as cultural and sports organizations, information about them is scarce.

=== Early history ===
The Grey Wolves organization was formed by Colonel Alparslan Türkeş in the late 1960s as the paramilitary wing of the Nationalist Movement Party (MHP). In 1968, over a hundred camps for ideological and paramilitary training were founded by Türkeş across Turkey. Canefe and Bora describe it as a grassroots fascist network, which had an active role in the economy, education, and neighbourhoods. Nasuh Uslu characterized it as a well-disciplined paramilitary organization, while Joshua D. Hendrick compared its organization to the Nazi Schutzstaffel (SS). Young male students and economic migrants from rural areas who have settled in Istanbul and Ankara made up the majority of its members. In 1973 Israeli orientalist Jacob M. Landau wrote that the importance of the Grey Wolves "is attested to by the fact that Türkeş himself assumed responsibility for the formation of these youth groups and assigned the supervision of their training to two of his close associates".

=== 1970s violence and 1980 coup ===
By the late 1970s the organizations had tens of thousands of members, and according to Amberin Zaman, the Turkish authorities had lost control over it. During the political violence between 1976 and 1980, members of the Grey Wolves were involved in numerous assassinations of left-wing and liberal activists, intellectuals, labour organizers, Kurds, officials, and journalists. The organization became a death squad engaged in "street killings and gunbattles". According to authorities, 220 of its members carried out 694 murders of left-wing and liberal activists and intellectuals. In total, some 5,000 to 6,000 people were killed in the violence, with the Grey Wolves responsible for the 'worst excesses'.

Their most significant attack of this period was the Maraş massacre in December 1978, when over 100 Alevis were killed. They are also accused of being behind the Taksim Square massacre on 1 May 1977 as well as acting as a "state-approved force" who used attacks on left-wing groups to "cause chaos and demoralization and inflame a climate in which a regime promising law and order would be welcomed by the masses." During this violent period, Grey Wolves operated with the encouragement and the protection of the Turkish Army's Special Warfare Department.

The conflict between left-wing and right-wing groups eventually resulted in a military intervention in September 1980 when General Kenan Evren led a coup d'état. According to Daniele Ganser, at the time of the coup, there were some 1,700 Grey Wolves branches, with about 200,000 registered members and a million sympathizers. Following the 1980 coup, the Grey Wolves and MHP were banned and their activity was diminished. Turkish nationalists and others assert that the Grey Wolves were "used and then discarded" by the deep state in Turkey.

There were also reports of Grey Wolves assisting Rhodesia during the Rhodesian Bush War.

=== Post-1980 ===
After the 1980 coup, the Grey Wolves reorganized. They began to direct their efforts against Kurds in Turkey, as well as lobbying for aggressive denial of the Armenian genocide and support of the Turkish occupation of Cyprus.

==== Anti-Kurdish violence and activism ====
===== 1990s =====
In the 1990s, the Grey Wolves turned their focus on the Kurds and participated in the Kurdish–Turkish conflict in Turkish Kurdistan. In 1999, Hürriyet Daily News described the organization as "the staunchest opponent to the Kurdish cause in Turkey."

In May 1998, the Grey Wolves were involved in two murders. On 3 May, a group of Grey Wolves attacked two students in Bolu who were passing by the organization's building. Kenan Mak, one of the students, was killed. On 5 May, a worker named Bilal Vural was killed in Istanbul's Şişli district, allegedly by the Grey Wolves. His family claimed that he was "brought several times to the Ülkü Ocakları building where ultranationalists forced him to become a member." They said that he was killed because he was a member of the pro-Kurdish People's Democracy Party (HADEP). As a result of these murders, Republican People's Party (CHP) Deputy Chairman Sinan Yerlikaya and the Freedom and Solidarity Party (ÖDP) requested that the Grey Wolves be banned by the authorities.

During the 1999 general election, the Grey Wolves attacked members of the HADEP, allegedly with impunity.

===== 2000s =====
In August 2002, the Grey Wolves burnt Masoud Barzani's effigy in a protest in Ankara after he claimed the partly Turkmen-inhabited Iraqi governorates of Kirkuk and Mosul as part of Iraqi Kurdistan.

===== 2010s =====
On 9 November 2010, Hasan Şimşek, a Grey Wolves member and a student, was killed at the Kütahya Dumlupınar University during an apparent fight between Kurdish nationalist and Turkish nationalist student groups. At his funeral, MHP leader Bahçeli stated that "We expect every kind of measure to be taken to prevent the expansion of the PKK mob, who have a tendency to grow in the universities." Violence between Turkish and Kurdish students also broke out in Marmara University in Istanbul on 12 November.

In September 2011, the Ankara Police Department raided 40 locations across Ankara belonging to the Grey Wolves. They took 36 people into custody and seized numerous guns and knives. According to police, the Grey Wolves were planning an attack on the pro-Kurdish Democratic Regions Party (BDP).

In October 2013, the Grey Wolves demonstrated across Turkey against the Kurdish–Turkish peace process.

In October 2014, the Grey Wolves were involved in deadly clashes during the 2014 Kurdish riots in Turkey against the government's perceived collaboration with the Islamic State during the Siege of Kobanî. A group of Grey Wolves in Sancaktepe, Istanbul, attempted to lynch a young man.

On 20 February 2015, Fırat Yılmaz Çakıroğlu, leader of the Grey Wolves organization in Ege University, was stabbed to death by left-wing and according to some reports, Kurdish nationalist students.

On 7–8 September 2015, Turkish nationalists, including Grey Wolves members, attacked 128 offices of the pro-Kurdish Peoples' Democratic Party (HDP) across Turkey in an apparent retaliation for anti-government attacks by the Kurdistan Workers' Party (PKK). Some have alleged that some of the attacks were carried out by AK Party members "masquerading as Grey Wolves" or that the Grey Wolves cooperated with AK Party members in attacks on HDP offices and left-wingers suspected of sympathy for the Kurds.

==== Greece-related violence and activism ====
On 18 June 1988 Kartal Demirağ, a senior member of the Grey Wolves, attempted to assassinate Prime Minister Turgut Özal's at the Motherland Party congress. Özal linked it to his visit to Greece three days earlier, saying that the attempt was carried out "by a group opposed to his efforts to improve relations with Greece."

On 6 September 2005, a group of nationalists, led by Grey Wolves leader Levent Temiz, stormed into an Istanbul exhibition commemorating the anti-Greek pogrom of 1955. They threw eggs and tore down photos. The Grey Wolves issued a statement denying involvement.

In the 2000s the Grey Wolves routinely demonstrated outside the Ecumenical Patriarchate of Constantinople in Fener (Phanar), Istanbul and burn the Patriarch in effigy. In October 2005 they staged a rally and proceeding to the gate they laid a black wreath, chanting "Patriarch Leave" and "Patriarchate to Greece", inaugurating the campaign for the collection of signatures to oust the Ecumenical Patriarchate from Istanbul. As of 2006 the Grey Wolves claimed to have collected more than 5 million signatures for the withdrawal of the Patriarch and called on the Turkish government to have the patriarch deported to Greece.

In December 2017 Grey Wolves members, among them the BBP-affiliated Alperen Hearths, invaded the Hagia Sophia and prayed there in protest against the United States recognition of Jerusalem as capital of Israel.

==== Anti-Armenian violence and activism ====
In January 2004, the Grey Wolves prevented the screening of Ararat, a film about the Armenian genocide, in Turkey.

On 24 April 2011, the murder of Sevag Balıkçı, a soldier of Armenian descent in the Turkish Army, was committed by Kıvanç Ağaoglu, who sympathized with Abdullah Çatlı, the late leader of the Grey Wolves. According to Ruben Melkonyan, an Armenian expert on Turkish studies, Ağaoglu was a member of the Grey Wolves.

On 24 April 2012, the Armenian Genocide Remembrance Day, nationalist groups, including the Grey Wolves, protested against the commemoration of the genocide in Istanbul's Taksim Square.

In June 2015, during a visit to the medieval Armenian city of Ani in Kars Province by the Armenian pianist Tigran Hamasyan, the local leader of the Grey Wolves suggested that his followers should "go on an Armenian hunt."

==== Other acts of violence ====
According to Zürcher and Linden, when Sunni radicals attacked Alevis in Istanbul in March 1995, the police in the Gazi quarter were "heavily infiltrated by Grey Wolves" and it was not until the police were replaced by military units that peace was restored.

In December 1996, the Grey Wolves attacked left-wing students and teachers at Istanbul University, with the alleged approval of the police.

In late November 2006 the Grey Wolves staged protests against Pope Benedict XVI's visit to Turkey. On 22 November, tens of protesters symbolically occupied Haghia Sophia in Istanbul to perform Muslim prayers. They chanted slogans against the Pope, such as "Don't make a mistake Pope, don't try our patience". Reuters reported that the event was organized by Alperen Ocakları, considered an offshoot of the Grey Wolves. Police arrested around 40 protesters for violating the ban on prayers in the former mosque, which had been a museum since the 1930s.

In July 2014 around a thousand people demonstrated in Kahramanmaraş against the presence of Syrian refugees who fled the Syrian Civil War. Many protesters made the sign of the Grey Wolves, blocked roads in the city and removed Arabic-language signs from stores. AKP lawyer Mahir Ünal commented: "This doesn't make them idealists [i.e. members of the Grey Wolves] but it is certain some people's attempt to show it like something the idealists did."

In July 2015 the Grey Wolves staged protests across Turkey, burnt flags of the People's Republic of China, and attacked Chinese restaurants and "tourists who were mistaken for being Chinese" in response to the Chinese government's ban on Muslim Turkic Uyghurs fasting in government offices during the holy month of Ramadan. Korean tourists were attacked by Grey Wolves. An Uighur worker at a Turkish-run Chinese restaurant was assaulted. Members of the Grey Wolves displayed a banner in multiple locations that read, "We crave Chinese blood." Grey Wolves members attacked the Thai consulate in Istanbul, in apparent retaliation for the deportation of hundreds of Uyghurs by Thailand. MHP chairman Devlet Bahçeli stated that "Our nationalist youth are sensitive to injustices in China," and said that the attacks by MHP-affiliated youth on South Korean tourists was "understandable," adding "What feature differentiates a Korean from a Chinese? They see that they both have slanted eyes. How can they tell the difference?"

In November 2015, the Grey Wolves protested Russian involvement in the Syrian Civil War near Istanbul's Russian consulate, Ankara, and Adana, accusing Russia of slaughtering Syrian Turkmens.

== Presence in Eurasia ==
=== Azerbaijan ===
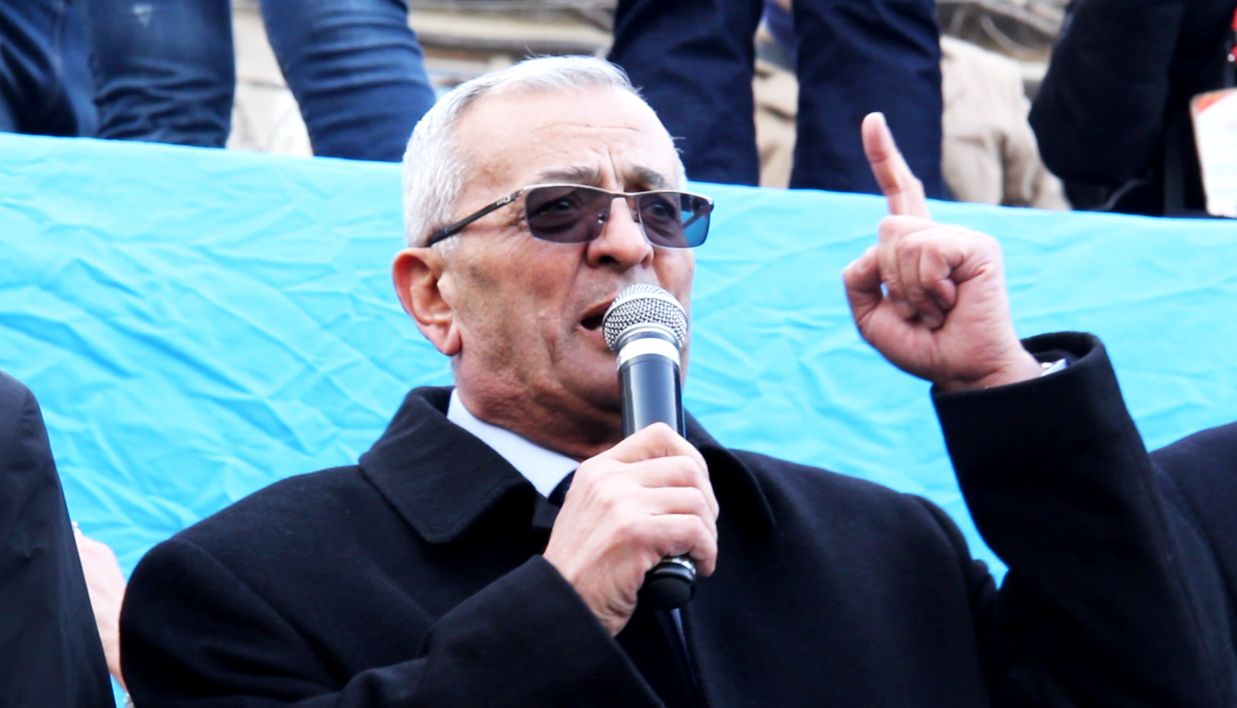
Isgandar Hamidov founded and led the Azerbaijani Grey Wolves in 1993–1995

During the First Nagorno-Karabakh War (1988–94), Grey Wolves members fought on the Azerbaijani side against Armenians, but many reportedly returned to Turkey in late 1992. Around 200 members of the Grey Wolves were still in the conflict zone in September 1994 to train Azerbaijani units.

In 1993, Azerbaijani Interior Minister Isgandar Hamidov established the Azerbaijan National Democrat Party (AzMDEP), which was known as Boz Qurd ("Grey Wolves"). According to Russian political scientist Stanislav Cherniavsky, the Azerbaijani Grey Wolves grew out of the nationalist Popular Front in 1992 and "considered itself a branch of the Turkish Grey Wolves." It was registered by the Justice Ministry in 1994. In interviews in 1992–93, Hamidov said there was no organisational link with the Turkish organization, stating that the "Grey Wolves of Azerbaijan are not subordinate to the Turkish group".

In March 1995, a coup d'état attempt against President Heydar Aliyev was staged in Baku by paramilitary police chief Rovshan Javadov, Turkish far-right organizations (including the Grey Wolves), and the Azerbaijani opposition. According to Thomas de Waal, the "shadowy backers of this uprising were never identified but appear to have included rogue elements of the Turkish security establishment and members of the 'Gray Wolves' Bozkurt movement." After the coup attempt, Hamidov was jailed, while the Azerbaijani Supreme Court formally abolished the National Democratic Party due to its links to the Turkish Grey Wolves, which it considered to be a terrorist organization. In 2004, Hamidov was freed in an amnesty granted by President Ilham Aliyev. In 2008, Hamidov retired from politics and as president of the party, which had been inactive since. After 2007, the Grey Wolves reportedly used to not operate in Azerbaijan for some time.

=== China (Xinjiang) ===
The Grey Wolves "set up training camps in Central Asia for youths from Turkic language groups" following the dissolution of the Soviet Union. Failing to find support in post-Soviet Central Asian republics, they targeted the Uyghurs, concentrated in the Chinese province of Xinjiang and began actively supporting the East Turkestan independence movement. In this scope, the Grey Wolves' European affiliates attacked Chinese tourists in the Netherlands. The Institute of Peace and Conflict Studies suggested in 2012 they are "highly limited in their reach and support base".

=== Northern Cyprus ===
Following the Turkish invasion of Cyprus in 1974 the Grey Wolves "continued to play a role in radicalizing the dispute with Greek Cypriots by actively engaging in violence on the island." They actively supported Rauf Denktaş, then President of the unrecognized Northern Cyprus between 1983 and 2005, and were involved, according to Harry Anastasiou, in state-sponsored terrorism against Cypriot citizens. In July 1996, Kutlu Adali, a Turkish Cypriot journalist who had criticized Denktaş and his policies, was killed by the Grey Wolves, according to some sources.

In August 1996, the Grey Wolves were involved in an attack on a protest of Greek Cypriots against the Turkish occupation of Northern Cyprus. In the same year Tassos Isaac, a Greek Cypriot protester, was beaten to death by the Grey Wolves in the United Nations Buffer Zone. In July 1997, the Grey Wolves clashed with Kurdish university students in Northern Cyprus who protested against Turkey's invasion of northern Iraq in search of Kurdistan Workers' Party (PKK) members.

On 17 October 2003, Murat Kanatlı, a Turkish Cypriot journalist and editor of the opposition newspaper Yeniçağ, was "attacked by a group of 20-30 persons belonging to the Grey Wolves" according to the International Press Institute (IPI). Kanatlı had covered the Grey Wolves' demonstration against the "intervention" of the European Union and the United States in elections in Northern Cyprus.

During the 2004 referendum on the Annan Plan, the Grey Wolves campaigned for a "no" vote. During the pre-voting period at least 50 Grey Wolves activists arrived in Northern Cyprus and caused riots against pro-ratification supporters. They were suspected of assaulting motorcyclists carrying "vote yes" banners.

In October 2013, the Grey Wolves opened a new headquarters in North Nicosia's Köşklüçiftlik quarter. During the opening ceremony Adem Yurdagül, the chairman of the Grey Wolves in Cyprus delivered a speech, while slogans like "Nicosia plain is home of Grey Wolves", "Cyprus is Turkish and will remain Turkish", "We are soldiers of [Alparslan] Türkeş", "The Grey Wolves Movement cannot be prevented" were chanted.

In November 2013, a fight broke out between members of the Grey Wolves and Kurdish university students at the Near East University in North Nicosia, resulting in arrest of 23 persons. According to the newspaper Havadis, "the cause of the fight was allegations by the Grey wolves' organization that some Kurdish students broke the windows of the Grey wolves organization’s building. Around 500 students went out on the streets holding clubs and rocks and the police asked for reinforcement in order to put them under control."

=== Russia ===
In November and December 2015, Federation Council member Andrey Klishas and two Communist Party members of the State Duma proposed outlawing the Grey Wolves in Russia. In August 2020, the Russian International Affairs Council, a government think tank, classified the Grey Wolves as an extremist organization.

According to a December 2015 report by the independent Russian online newspaper Svobodnaya Pressa, Crimean Tatar nationalists have apparently began cooperating with the Grey Wolves in Crimea. (Note: The status of Crimea and of the city of Sevastopol is currently under dispute between Russia and Ukraine; Ukraine and the majority of the international community consider Crimea to be an autonomous republic of Ukraine and Sevastopol to be one of Ukraine's cities with special status, while Russia, on the other hand, considers the Crimea to be a federal subject of Russia and Sevastopol to be one of Russia's three federal cities.)

==== Chechnya ====
Members of the Grey Wolves fought on the Chechen separatist side during the First Chechen War (1994–1996) and the Second Chechen War (1999–2000). CNN reported in 2000 that the Grey Wolves with most pro-Chechen stance were those affiliated with the Islamist Great Union Party (BBP), which had split from MHP in 1993. The article suggested that they "run the mosques and commercial activities in some parts of Istanbul. It is in these mosques, in the suburbs of the city, that offerings are collected after daily prayers for the Chechen refugees. It is money that probably also goes to soldiers on the front lines." According to Svante Cornell it is "widely believed that the Grey Wolves organised arms shipments to Chechnya, probably with at least the partial knowledge of the Turkish authorities." Russian media has alleged that the Turkish government knew and possibly supported, or at least did not prevent, the activities of the Grey Wolves in Chechnya. Georgian Minister of State Security Valery Khaburdania stated in 2002 that the Grey Wolves were the "conduit of assistance" to the Chechen militants.

Azerbaijani Grey Wolves also participated in the fight against Russia. In January 1995 Kommersant cited the Federal Counterintelligence Service (FSK) in stating that the Azerbaijani Grey Wolves sent 80 fighters to Chechnya. Another 270 fighters went to Chechnya in December of that year.

== United States ==
The organization have maintained a documented presence in the United States through Turkish nationalist associations, particularly in New York and New Jersey. One such association, Amerika Türk İslam Ülkü Ocakları (American Turkish Islamic Idealist Hearths), was active in New Jersey by 2012. In May of that year, Anadolu Agency reported that the organization held a public gathering in Paterson, New Jersey, attended by members of the Turkish-American community. Its president, Adil Yiğiter, addressed the participants.

In 2013, the World Uyghur Congress reported that the association had organized a demonstration outside the Chinese Embassy in Washington, D.C., protesting China's treatment of Uyghurs. In April 2021, an organization identified as Amerika Ülkü Ocakları–New York was listed among the signatories of a joint statement issued by Turkic-American associations. Later that year, the Global Influence Operations Report identified Amerika Ülkü Ocakları among organizations whose logos appeared in publicity for a New York conference organized by the Turkish American National Steering Committee.

In April 2025, the United States Court of Appeals for the Third Circuit upheld an immigration ruling that treated the Grey Wolves as a Tier III, or undesignated, terrorist organization under U.S. immigration law.

== Syria ==
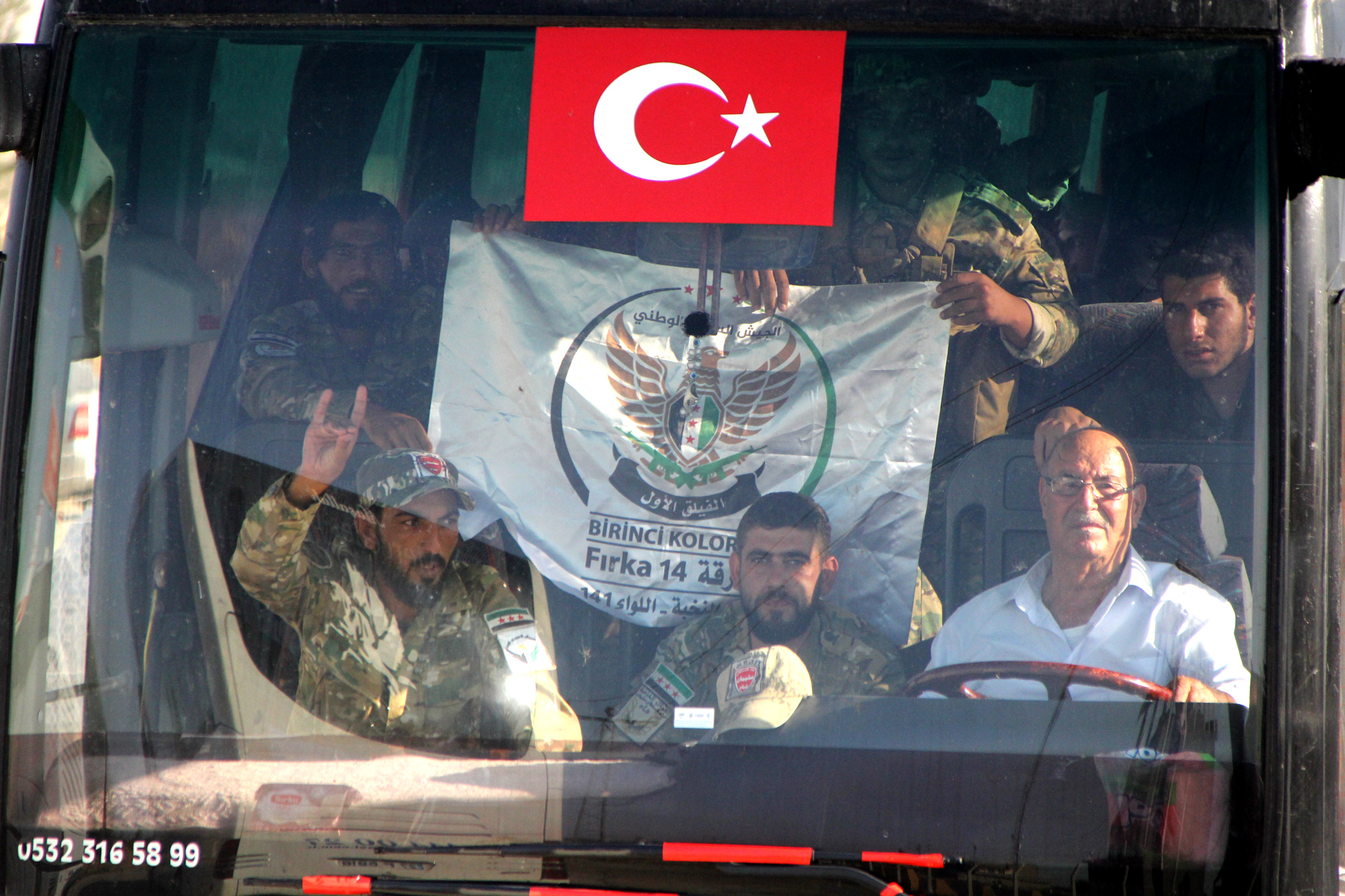
Rebels of the Sultan Suleiman Shah Division, a Turkmen group in the Syrian National Army, transported from Azaz to Akçakale during the 2019 Turkish offensive into north-eastern Syria. One of them makes the Grey Wolves sign (left).

Activists of the MHP and Idealist Hearths have fought in the Syrian civil war in support of the Syrian Turkmen, whom they consider kinsmen. The MHP and Grey Wolves have provided the Syrian Turkmen Assembly with relief aid and fighters. Syrian Turkmen Assembly president Abdurrahman Mustafa stated in 2016 that "Turkish NGOs, just as the Grey Wolves, give us humanitarian aid." According to Egypt Today the National Intelligence Organization of Turkey (MİT) "is believed to be recruiting retired military personnel to provide support for armed groups operating in Syria, through the Grey Wolves Brigades."

Some Syrian rebel groups have ties to the Grey Wolves. One is the Muntasir Billah Brigade, another is the Turkmen Abdulhamid Han Brigade.

On 24 November 2015, the Turkish Air Force shot down a Russian Sukhoi Su-24M bomber aircraft near the Syria–Turkey border. The pilot was shot in mid-air parachuting toward land by Syrian Turkmen rebels under Syrian Turkmen Brigades. The Turkmen rebel group operated under the command of Alparslan Çelik, a Turkish national and a Grey Wolves member from Elazığ.

Youm7, an Egyptian news site picked up a document allegedly issued by the Army of Conquest (Jaish al-Fatah), which claimed that it conspired with the Turkistan Islamic Party and the Grey Wolves in the December 2016 assassination of Andrei Karlov, the Russian ambassador to Turkey.

== Thailand ==
The 2015 Bangkok bombing is suspected to have been carried out by the Grey Wolves due to Thailand's deportation of Uyghur terrorist suspects back to China instead of allowing them to travel to Turkey for asylum. A man with fake Turkish passports using the name Adem Karadag was arrested by the Thai police in connection to the bombing and bomb making materials found in his apartment.

== Presence in Europe ==
=== Austria ===
In Austria, the Grey Wolves salute as well as its symbols were legally banned starting from 1 March 2019. It is punishable by fines up to €4,000. Turkey's Foreign Ministry condemned the ban. "[T]he 'bozkurt' ('Grey Wolves') sign, which is a symbol of a legal political party in Turkey and the 'rabia' sign that is widely used by Muslims in many countries as well as in Turkey. We do not accept this and we strongly condemn it," read the Foreign Ministry statement. Turkey also called on Austria to "correct this grave mistake," because it "deeply offends Turkey, the Turkish community in Austria and Muslims." In early March 2019, Grey Wolves sympathizers started a campaign on Twitter by sending Chancellor Sebastian Kurz hundreds of photos of people showing the salute. Kurz defended the ban declaring people and organizations that do not accept democratic values, or fight against those values, have no place in Austria.

In January 2020 four Turkish bus drivers were fired in Vienna for making the Grey Wolves sign. On 26 June 2020, Turkish nationalist groups, identified by journalist Jake Hanrahan as Grey Wolves members, attacked Kurdish rallies in Vienna protesting the Turkish operation in Iraqi Kurdistan. Turkey criticized the handling of the violence by the Austrian police and claimed that it was organized by PKK sympathizers.

=== Belgium ===
The Belçika Türk Federasyonu (BTF) is considered to be "affiliated with or sympathetic" to the Grey Wolves. According to one study, its aim is "to foster loyalty among young people of Turkish origin to their ancestral culture, religion and history and to keep alive the Turkish identity in Europe. BTF claims to oppose not the integration of Belgian-Turks into their host society but rather their assimilation by it." Its activities mostly focus on "issues relevant to Turkish national sensitivities". For instance, it has demonstrated against the erection of an Armenian Genocide memorial in Brussels. During the municipal elections of 2006 two member of the BTF came to the attention of the media: Fuat Korkmazer on the Flemish Christian Democrats (CD&V) list in Ghent and Murat Denizli on the Francophone Socialist Party (PS) list in Schaerbeek, a municipality in the Brussels Region. Korkmazer got a very low number of votes, while Denizli was elected but had to resign because it was discovered he had a false address and lived in another municipality. In 2019, sp.a candidate Mustafa Ayutar was linked to the organization. In 2019, Belgian-Kurdish New Flemish Alliance politician Zuhal Demir reported that posters advertising her candidacy in Maasmechelen had been vandalized with swastikas and the symbol of the Grey Wolves.

In 2022, Grey Wolves vandalized an Armenian genocide memorial in Brussels with three crescents, similar to the MHP logo.

=== France ===
In May 1984, Grey Wolves leader Abdullah Çatlı carried out a bombing of an Armenian Genocide memorial in Alfortville, a Paris suburb.

According to Direction générale de la sécurité intérieure members of the Grey Wolves partook in a 21 January 2012 demonstration in Paris against the adoption of the bill criminalizing the Armenian genocide denial in France.

In November 2020, France banned the Grey Wolves organization after defacement of an Armenian Genocide Memorial, organizing combat training camps in the Ardèche region in 2019, inciting violence against Kurds and Armenians and orchestrating marches targeting Armenians near Lyon. Turkey's Foreign Ministry criticized the ban and said: "we will reciprocate to this decision in the strongest way." In addition, accused the French government of tolerating associations affiliated with the PKK and the FETÖ.

=== Germany ===
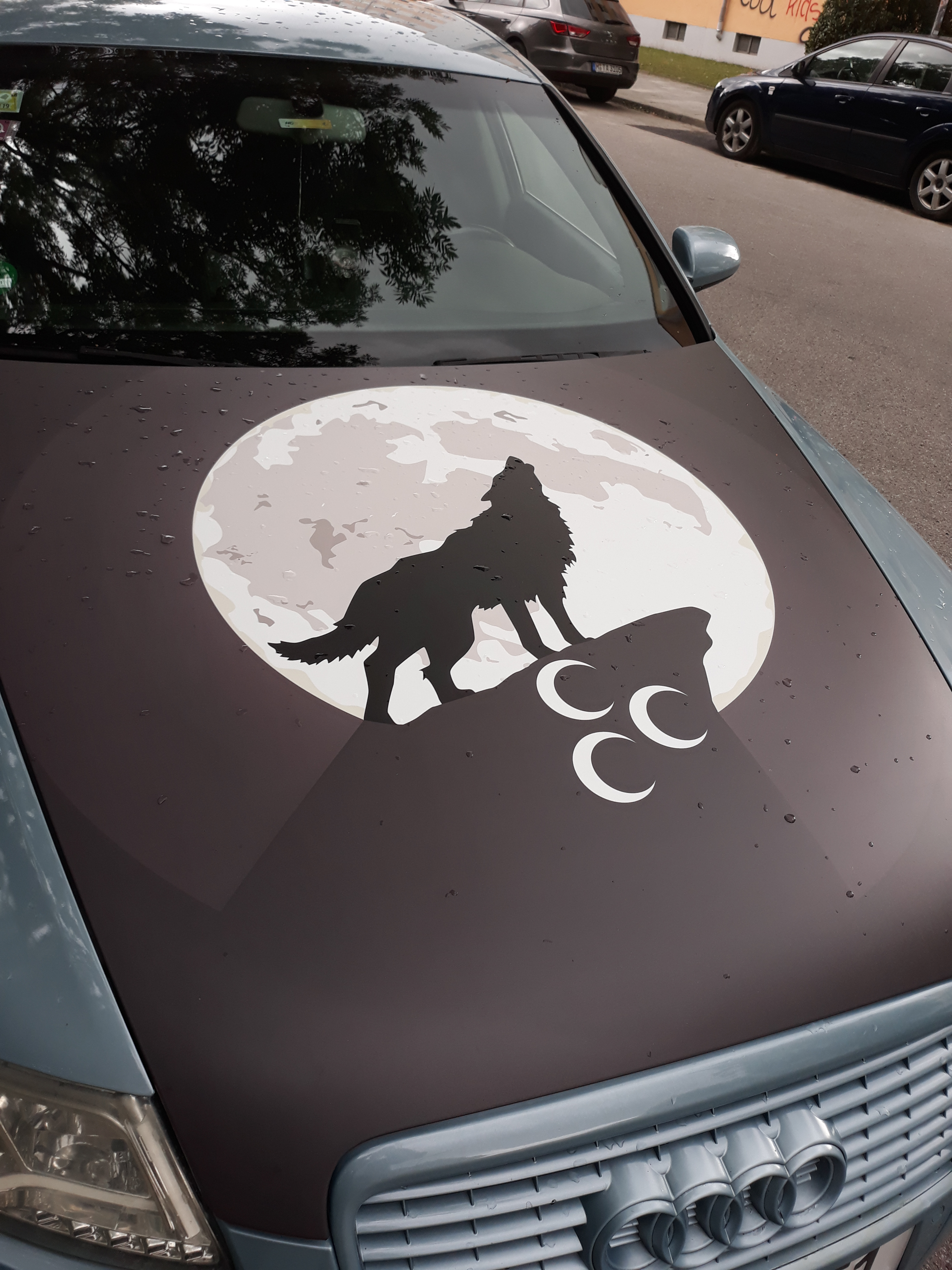
Grey Wolves symbols on a car in Munich, 2019

As a far-right extremist group, the Grey Wolves are monitored by the German authorities. The Federal Office for the Protection of the Constitution assumes that there are around 12,100 people in Germany who can be assigned to the "Ülkücü" movement and its ideology as of 2023. The majority of these – around 10,500 supporters – are organized in clubs, which in turn are grouped together under the umbrella of larger associations. A 2017 article published by the Federal Agency for Civic Education estimated over 18,000 members.

The three "Ülkücü" associations in Germany with the largest number of members are:

- "Federation of Turkish Democratic Idealist Associations in Germany e.V." (ADÜTDF), with around 7,000 members organized in around 200 local associations.
- "ATİB – Union of Turkish-Islamic Cultural Associations in Europe e.V." (ATİB), with around 2,500 members in 25 associations.
- "Federation of the World Order in Europe" (ANF), with around 1,000 members in around 15 local associations.

The group transfers conflicts from their native Turkey into Germany with harassment against Kurds and Armenians as well as people with leftist political views in general. Its members have actively engaged in attacks on and clashes with Kurds in Germany.

Historically the most important Grey Wolves-affiliated Turkish organization in Germany was the Türk Federasyon (Avrupa Demokratik Ülkücü Türk Dernekleri Federasyonu, ADÜTDF), which had around 200 member organizations. Founded in 1978 by 64 nationalist organizations it declined in the 1980s, but revived in the 1990s and claimed to have doubled its membership following the Solingen arson attack of 1993. It denies any direct links with the Grey Wolves in Turkey or the MHP, however, its monthly journal publishes articles praising the MHP and denouncing left-wing and Kurdish organizations in Turkey and Germany. According to educationalist Kemal Bozay, their influence on third generation Turkish youth—who are "looking for an identity"—has "increased significantly". They had ties to the banned Turkish-nationalistic outlaw motorcycle club Osmanen Germania BC.

According to the Baden-Württemberg State Government, there are 45 Grey Wolves clubs and associations in that state as of 2012. These associations are often given non-political names (usually cultural and athletic) to conceal their identity.

In 2013, in three German federal states, "two live arms with ammunition, blank-firing guns, batons, electric stun guns and Samurai swords" were seized from members of the Grey Wolves.

The Ministry of the Interior of North Rhine-Westphalia, Germany's most populous state where 70 Grey Wolves associations with more than 2,000 members operated in 2011, also monitors the organization. Nevertheless, Serdar Yüksel, a Social Democratic Party member of the state's parliament, stated in a 2011 interview that the threat of the Grey Wolves in Germany is underestimated. He said, "When thousands of Turkish right-wing radicals come together in Essen, we're not worried. But if 100 members of NPD march, we immediately organize a counter-demonstration." Olaf Lehne, a Christian Democratic Union member of North Rhine-Westphalia's state parliament, stated in an interview that the Grey Wolves "are in this country, unfortunately, too often ignored." He also added that they have a large number of sympathizers among young people.

Another important organization affiliated with the Grey Wolves is the Union of Turkish-Islamic Cultural Associations in Europe (Turkish: Avrupa Türk-İslam Birliği, ATİB; German: Union der Türkisch-Islamischen Kulturvereine in Europa).

During the UEFA Euro 2024 football tournament held in Germany, several Turkish supporters were observed giving the "wolf salute," a hand gesture associated with the Grey Wolves. The incident occurred during the group stage match between Turkey and Italy, held in Munich on June 20, 2024. The "wolf salute" was prominently displayed by a section of Turkish fans, leading to immediate condemnation from various quarters.

UEFA issued a statement reaffirming its commitment to keeping political and extremist expressions out of football. The German Football Association (DFB) also expressed its concern and emphasized the need for vigilance against far-right activities in sports events. Turkey's Merih Demiral was subsequently banned "for violating the basic rules of decent conduct, for using sports events for manifestations of a non-sporting nature and for bringing the sport of football into disrepute" for allegedly making a "wolf salute" during Turkey's round of 16 win over Austria.

From 2014-2018 the Osmanen Germania were an extreme right criminal gang working as security guards for the Grey Wolves.

=== Netherlands ===
As early as 1979 the Dutch Scientific Council for Government Policy reported that clashes between the Grey Wolves and the Dutch-Turkish Workers Association (HTIB) occurred on May Day celebrations. Organizations such as Turkish Federation Netherlands (Turkse Federatie Nederland, TFN) and Turkish Islamic Federation (Turks Islamitische Federatie) have links to the Grey Wolves. According to Wangmo and Yazilitas, the Grey Wolves in the Netherlands have engaged in a variety of activities, ranging from criminal activities and nationalist propaganda to support of football teams. The organization was more influential in the 1990s, when many first-generation Turkish immigrants "maintained a deep interest in Turkish politics and who had a deeply felt Turkish identity." Grey Wolves activists have participated—with varying success—in the local politics of several Dutch municipalities.

In November 2020, VVD MP Bente Becker introduced a motion to ban the Grey Wolves. The motion was supported by 147 members of the parliament with 3 members voting against it. All three votes against the motion came from Denk.

=== Sweden ===
On 13 September 2015, an explosion occurred at a Kurdish civil center in Stockholm, Sweden, following clashes between Turks, Kurds, and anti-fascists at a rally organized by the Swedish Grey Wolves.

The Swedish Green Party was hit by a political scandal in April 2016, as images emerged of party member and Housing Minister Mehmet Kaplan attending a dinner party alongside leading members of the Grey Wolves. Kaplan resigned when a 2009 video was made public in which he compared Israel's treatment of Palestinians to that of Jews by Nazi Germany. The Sweden Democrats party have called for the Grey Wolves to be banned in Europe and for its members in Sweden to be deported.

=== Vatican ===
On 13 May 1981 Mehmet Ali Ağca, an alleged Grey Wolves member, attempted to murder Pope John Paul II in St. Peter's Square. The masterminds were not identified and the organization's role remains unclear. According to Daniel Pipes and Khalid Duran Grey Wolves appear to have been involved in the assassination attempt and write that Ağca "in his own confused way mixed Turkish nationalist sentiments with fundamentalist Islam." However, Italian investigators could not establish his link to the Grey Wolves.

=== Norway ===
There is allegedly a Grey Wolf group recruiting in Drammen, Norway.

== Illegal drug trade allegations ==
Grey Wolves members and leaders have been involved in international drug trafficking since the 1980s. In the early 1980s, U.S. anti-terrorism officials at the State Department reported that Türkeş is "widely believed to have been involved" in moving heroin from Turkey into Western Europe. According Stephen E. Ambrose, the leaders of Grey Wolves had built an army in the late 1980s by trading drugs for military equipment, ranging from assault helicopters to tanks. Drugs were transported to Italy, where organized crime processed them. According to Peter Dale Scott, the author of the book American War Machine, in 2010 there were drug producing and dealing groups that had clear ties with the Grey Wolves and its affiliated political party, MHP.

== Designation as a terrorist group ==
In 2005, Kazakhstan banned the Grey Wolves, classifying it as a terrorist group.

Following the November 2020 ban of the Grey Wolves in France for hate speech and violence, and the calls for similar actions to be taken in the Netherlands and Germany, the European Parliament urged, on 20 May 2021, that the 27 member states of the European Union to designate the Grey Wolves as a terrorist group, and thus, marking the first time that an EU institution has linked the Grey Wolves to terrorism. The Turkish government reacted to the EP report by calling it "biased" and "unacceptable", because, according to the Turkish Foreign Ministry spokesperson Tanju Bilgiç, the Grey Wolves are "a legal movement, which is associated with a long-established political party in Turkey." The MFA claimed the "slanders" are "fabricated by the anti-Turkey Armenian diaspora as well as PKK and FETÖ circles."

In September 2021 United States Representative Dina Titus (D-NV) proposed designating the Grey Wolves as a terrorist group through an amendment to the Fiscal Year 2022 National Defense Authorization Act (NDAA). The proposed amendment asked the US Secretary of State to provide "a detailed report of the activities of the Grey Wolves organization undertaken against US interests, allies, and international partners" and determine if the organization "meet the criteria for designation as a foreign terrorist organization."

In April 2025, the United States Court of Appeals for the Third Circuit designated the Grey Wolves as a Tier III terrorist organization.

Noted Grey Wolves member Cengiz Telci has stated in regards to accusations of violence against Kurds that "I don't kill people; I kill terrorists. Terrorist not people".

== Cultural references ==
The Grey Wolves organization benefits from Turkish TV films and series, such as those released in 2003 to 2005 or 2018, which glorify Turkish nationalism.

- The Turkish television series Valley of the Wolves ("Kurtlar Vadisi") and The Wolves ("Börü") are particularly likely to provoke an exaggerated nationalist attitude and reinforce enemy images that are inherent in the Ülkücü movement.
- In the 2002 film Aram a French-Armenian fighter named Levon attempts to kill a high level Turkish general who is the head of Grey Wolves.
- In the 2003 novel L'Empire des loups ("Empire of the Wolves") by Jean-Christophe Grangé the Grey Wolves are involved in a woman's murder. The 2005 film Empire of the Wolves is based on the same-name novel by Grangé.
- The left-wing American podcast Chapo Trap House (2016–present) refers to avid fans and Patreon backers as "Grey Wolves," an ironic reference to the podcast's pretended support of Erdoğan and the AKP.

== See also ==
- Attempted assassination of Pope John Paul II
- Alperen Hearths
- Ergenekon, a Turkish secularist clandestine organization accused of plotting against the Turkish government
  - Ergenekon trials
- Racism and discrimination in Turkey
- Pan-Turkism
  - Nasyonal Aktivite ve Zinde İnkişaf, defunct Turkish neo-Nazi political association founded by former Republican Villagers Nation Party (CKMP) members
- Turkish nationalism
- Ulusalcılık
  - Vatansever Kuvvetler Güç Birliği Hareketi, a Turkish ultra-nationalist group founded by former Grey Wolves

== Bibliography ==
- Zürcher, E.J.; Linden, H. van der (2004). The European Union, Turkey and Islam (PDF). Netherlands Scientific Council for Government Policy: Amsterdam University Press. ISBN 978-90-5356-712-8. Archived from the original (PDF) on 7 November 2014.
- Avagyan, Ashot, ed. (2013). Պանթուրքական երազանք կամ "Գորշ գայլեր" [Pan-Turkic dream or "Grey Wolves"] (PDF) (in Armenian). Yerevan: Asoghik. ISBN 978-99941-2-834-1. Archived from the original (PDF) on 5 November 2014.
