= Intellectuals' Hearth =

Conservative think thank in Turkey

- Formation: 14 May 1970; 56 years ago
- Type: Think tank
- Location: Fatih, Istanbul, Turkey
- Fields: Politics
- President: Mustafa Erkal
- Website: aydinlarocagi.org

The Intellectuals' Hearth (Turkish: Aydınlar Ocağı) is a conservative think tank which has been instrumental in the formation of right-wing political movements in Turkey since its establishment in 1970. The influence of the group increased following the military coup on 12 September 1980 through its development and introduction of the Turkish–Islamic synthesis.

== Background and history ==
Immediately after the military coup of 27 May 1960 which ended the rule of Democrat Party a group of conservative academics and thinkers, including Süleyman Yalçın, Arif Nihat Asya, Kemal Ilıcak, Tarık Buğra and Ali Fuat Başgil established an association called the Thinkers Club (Turkish: Aydınlar Kulübü) in 1961 of which ideology was a synthesis of Turkism and Islamism. Yalçın was elected as the first president of the association. Major members of the Club included İsmail Dayı, Ayhan Songar, Necmettin Erbakan and Agah Oktay Güner. It was disbanded in 1965.

The Intellectuals' Hearth (IH) succeeded the Thinkers Club to provide an alternative to Turkish youth against the Turkish leftist intellectual movements which had gained strength as a result of the 1968 movements. It was founded on 14 May 1970, the twentieth anniversary of the Democrat Party's victory in the 1950 general election. Its name was suggested by the conservative thinker Necip Fazıl Kısakürek to emphasize the fact that intellectuals might also adopt right-wing views. The IH was established by 56 conservative figures, and 31 of them were academics. The notable IH founders included İbrahim Kafesoğlu, Muharrem Ergin, Ahmet Kabaklı, Süleyman Yalçın, Nevzat Yalçıntaş, Kemalettin Erbakan, Ayhan Songar and Asım Taşer. A leading conservative figure, Nurettin Topçu, was also instrumental in the establishment of the IH.

The IH was one of the nationalist conservative factions in Turkey in the Cold War years and was in competition with others, including Racist-Turanists, the Anatolianists (Turkish: Anadolucular) and the National-Strugglists (Turkish: Milli Mücadeleciler). The branches of the IH were established in various cities from 1980. The first one was opened in Ankara, and the others in Bursa, Kocaeli, İzmir, Erzurum and Konya. The number of the IH branches was eight in 1988.

As of 2017 the IH was described as a political lobby group far from its former power and influence with its discourses of cooperation with Kemalism, nationalism and left-wing politics.

=== Presidents and notable members ===
The founding president of the IH was İbrahim Kafesoğlu. The other presidents of the IH included Süleyman Yalçın, Salih Tuğ, Ayhan Songar (acting) and Nevzat Yalçıntaş. Mustafa Erkal has been serving as the IH president since 1998.

The members of the IH are mostly conservative journalists, academics and intellectuals. From its start in 1970 to 1988 the membership of the IH was strictly limited to those who had a profession. The IH members increased in 1988 when this limitation was relaxed. As of 2011 the number of the IH members was 270.

Muharrem Ergin was a member of the IH who shaped the ideology of the group. Necip Fazıl Kısakürek became a member of the IH in 1975. Another notable member was Tarık Buğra who was also part of the Thinkers Club. Hasan Celal Güzel and Şaban Karataş were Ankara-based IH members. The latter also headed the Ankara branch of the IH after 1987. Another Ankara-based member of the IH was Şükrü Elçin, an academic at Hacettepe University. Mükerrem Taşçıoğlu, a politician from the Motherland Party, was also a member of the IH.

== Activities ==
The IH began organizing seminars and conferences soon after its establishment. These conferences in the 1970s were attended by future politicians such as Abdullah Gül and Recep Tayyip Erdoğan. The group also has had charitable associations, hospitals such as Türkiye Hastanesi, companies, schools, mosques and financial institutions. Various media outlets, including Türkiye Gazetesi, TGRT TV and some radio channels, were also close to the IH in the late 1990s.

== Views and political influence ==
The IH opposes both elitist and statist approaches. It have regarded humanists, cosmopolitans, atheists, Christians and leftists as enemies of the nation.

The IH supports the view that there should be a close connection between modern Turkey and "its Ottoman past". The nationalist views of the historian Nihal Atsız have been supported by the IH members. The group argued that the major reason for the Turkey’s economic crisis experienced in the late 1970s was the dysfunctionality of the Turkish educational system.

One of the most important views developed by the IH is the Turkish–Islamic synthesis which was first used in 1973. It was developed based on the assumption that people may be both nationalistic and religious without any contradiction. There are various claims about its major components, Turkish nationalism and Islamism. Some argue that its main ideology is Islamism, not Turkish nationalism. However, in the late 1990s it was speculated that its focus was on Turkish nationalism not on Islamism. The nationalism component of the synthesis was defined as national culture rather than race. The synthesis also covered some Western elements, including advancement in science, technology and economics and reinforced the Western military and political doctrines. Therefore, the IH supports a "cautious" engagement with the European and Western institutions since in such interactions the Turkish‐Muslim identity should be retained.

In line with the IH's goal to offer a shared ideology for right-wing political parties in Turkey, the Turkish–Islamic synthesis has been employed by various political groups. The synthesis was adopted by the Nationalist Movement Party in its party program in the 1970s. It was then used as a basis for the nationalist coalition governments, known as Nationalist Front, formed by the Justice Party, Nationalist Movement Party and National Salvation Party in the second half of the 1970s.

The Turkish–Islamic synthesis was also employed by the military government from 1980 to reestablish the social order of Turkish society which had been damaged during the terrorist activities in the 1970s. One of the reasons for its adoption was that it was against political Islam and regarded Islam as a cultural element focusing on its prayers and rituals. The fact that it had no conflict with the Kemalist regime was another factor in its acceptance by the state apparatus. As a result, the synthesis was officially endorsed by the Atatürk Supreme Council on 20 June 1986 as the basis of the Turkish cultural activities. The ruling Motherland Party also adopted and supported the Turkish–Islamic synthesis between 1983 and 1989 under the leadership of Turgut Özal.

In the 1980s the influence of the IH was not limited to political area in that textbooks and educational programs were written and developed in parallel to the Turkish–Islamic synthesis. One of the most significant changes as a result of this reorganization was the introduction of the compulsory religious culture and morality course in primary and secondary schools. In addition, the IH members were appointed to various posts at the Turkish Radio and Television Corporation and the Council of Higher Education.

In the late 1990s Turkish nationalism became the dominant ideology of the IH. However, as a result of the rise of the Islamist political parties Islamism also gained importance in the IH. Such changes led to differences within the IH concerning the political parties supported. The nationalist wing became closer to the Nationalist Movement Party whereas the Islamist wing began to develop connections with the international Islamist movements.

== Criticism ==
The IH has been criticized due to its cooperation with the military leaders of the 1980 coup. For instance, Gencay Şaylan, a Turkish academic and political scientist, argued in 1988 that the IH is an organization similar to Opus Dei in terms of its aim to formulate an intellectual and ethical basis for an authoritarian political system in Turkey. In 1998 Burak Arıkan likened the IH to the Nouvelle Droite which provided a right-wing ideology to the political groups in France.

The group is also regarded as a tool of the Turkish state in the Cold War setting to reduce and ultimately, eliminate the potential effects of Communism in the country.
