= Süleyman Yalçın =

Turkish physician and conservative thinker (1926–2016)

- Born: 1926; Büyükanafartalar, Eceabat, Çanakkale, Turkey
- Died: 18 December 2016 (aged 89–90); Istanbul, Turkey
- Education: Istanbul University
- Years active: 1950s–2000s
- Children: 2
- Medical career
- Profession: Physician
- Institutions: Istanbul University
- Sub-specialties: Internal medicine

Süleyman Yalçın (1926–2016) was a Turkish physician, academic, conservative political figure and journalist who headed a conservative nationalist think-tank called the Aydınlar Ocağı (Turkish: Intellectuals' Hearth) in the 1970s and 1980s. He was a faculty member at Istanbul University between 1952 and 1988. He is known for his active role in the formulation of the Turkish–Islamic synthesis.

== Early life and education ==
He was born in Büyükanafartalar, a village of Çanakkale, in 1926. After completing primary and secondary schools in his hometown, he graduated from Kabataş Boys High School in 1944 and from the Faculty of Medicine, Istanbul University, in 1950.

== Career and activities ==
Yalçın joined his alma mater in 1952 and completed his training in internal medicine in 1957. He became a professor of pathology in 1968. In the early 1960s he was involved in the establishment of the Thinkers Club (Turkish: Aydınlar Kulübü) of which ideology was a synthesis of Turkism and Islamism. The other major members of the group included Arif Nihat Asya, Kemal Ilıcak, Tarık Buğra and Ali Fuat Başgil. Yalçın was elected as the first president of the group.

Yalçın worked at the American universities as a faculty member from 1964 to 1966 and from 1970 to1973. Following his return Yalçın became the chair of Aydınlar Ocağı on 30 January 1974, replacing İbrahim Kafesoğlu in the post. Yalçın was a cofounder of the association which was founded on 14 May 1970. His tenure ended 31 May 1979. Yalçın was elected to the post for a second time on 4 April 1984 and held the post until 29 June !988 when Salih Tuğ was named as the chair of Aydınlar Ocağı. During his second term the association developed a new approach called Turkish–Islamic synthesis which shaped the Turkish right-wing politics for a long time.

Yalçın retired from Istanbul University in 1988. He published articles in various newspapers and magazines, including Büyük Doğu (1956–1959, 1972), Yeni İstiklal (1962–1963), Kök (1981–1982), Boğaziçi (1984–1986), Ortadoğu (1974) and Tercüman (1976–1988). He also published a book entitled Aydınlar Ocağı ve Türk-İslâm sentezi (Turkish: Intellectuals' Hearth and Turkish–Islamic synthesis) in 1988.

=== Views ===
Tayfun Atay, a Turkish academic and writer, argued in 2016 that Yalçın's views were the driving force behind the change in the official-ideological orbit of the Turkish state after the military coup of 12 September 1980. Yalçın was also influential in the formation of the intellectual background of nationalist governments just before the coup through Aydınlar Ocağı which he headed.

Yalçın described Turks as "Muslims who speak the Turkish language." In an interview with Cumhuriyet in 1988 while serving as the chair of Aydınlar Ocağı he further argued "Turkishness and Islam have become so inextricably linked over the centuries that when a Turk loses his religion, he loses his Turkish identity." He added that even if Turks do not believe in Islam, they must show respect to Islam due to the fact that "it is the religion of their nation." Therefore, for him Islam has a central role in Turkish identity.

== Personal life and death ==
Yalçın was married and had two sons, Sinan and Selim.

Yalçın died of multiple organ failure at Istanbul University's Hospital on 18 December 2016 at the age of 90. He was buried in Büyükanafartalar, Çanakkale, next day after funeral prayers in the Fatih Mosque. The Turkish Prime Minister Recep Tayyip Erdoğan attended the funeral ceremony and carried his coffin.

== Legacy ==
A city hospital in Göztepe, Istanbul, was named after him in September 2020.
