= Karanlik Kümbet =

Historic mausoleum in Erzurum, Turkey

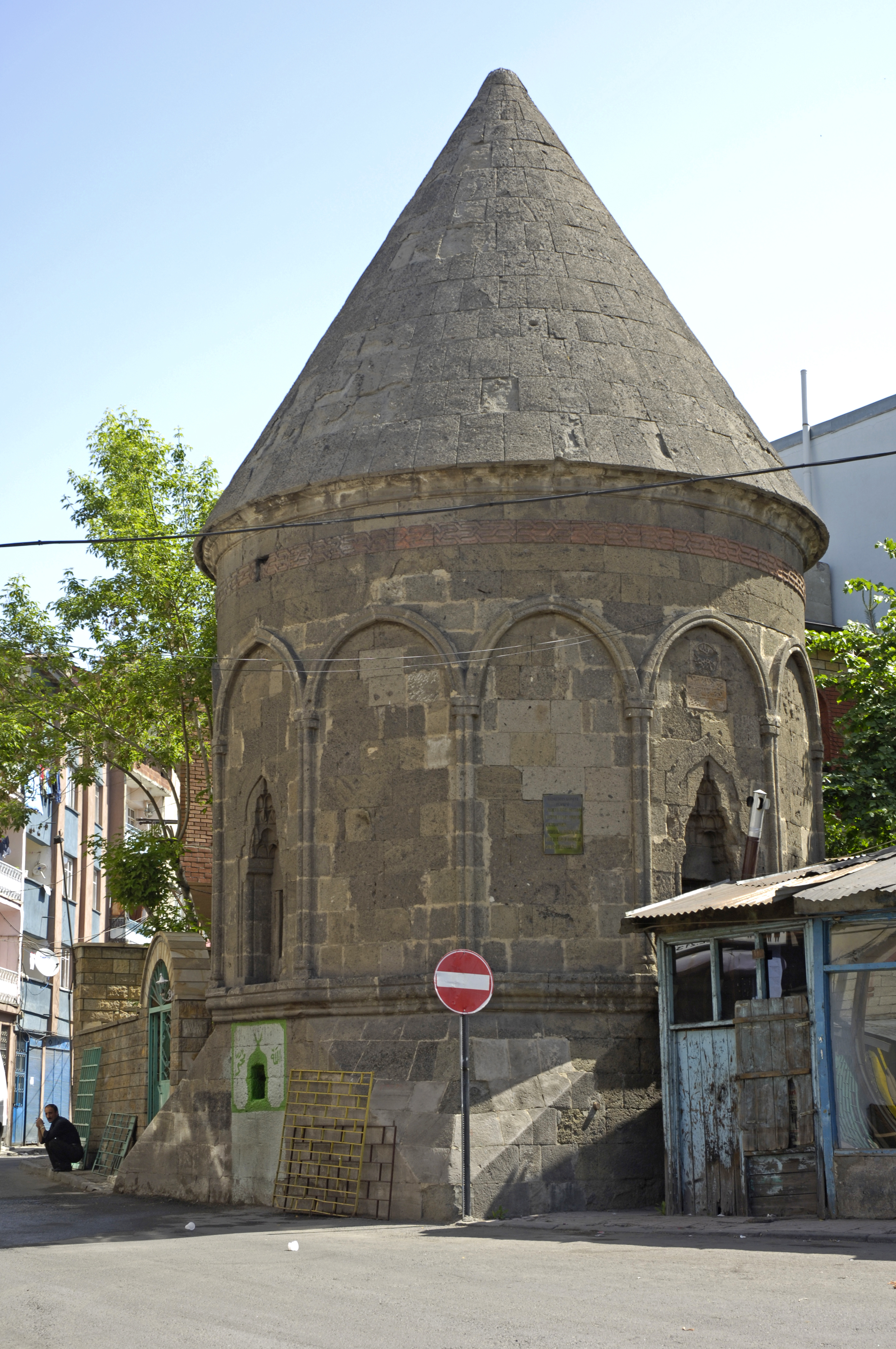

- Location within Turkey

Religion
- Affiliation: Islam
- Province: Erzurum Province

Location
- Location: Erzurum, Turkey
- Coordinates: 39.9106567°N 41.2788246°E

Architecture
- Type: mausoleum
- Style: Seljuk
- General contractor: Sadreddin Türkbeg
- Completed: 1308
- Materials: stone, brick

Karanlik Kümbet (literally meaning "Dark Tomb") also known as Emir Sadrettin Kümbeti, is a historic mausoleum, or kümbet, located at Gülahmet Street of Erzurum, Turkey, opposite the Derviş Ağa Mosque.

It is sometimes known as Sadrettin Konevi Türbesi and it dates back to the end of Seljuk rule in the early 14th century.

== History ==
Construction of the mausoleum started in 1307-1308 under Sadreddin Türkbeg, the son of an Ilkhanid governor of Khorasan. The tomb was constructed in memory of his deceased father, Khoja Vecih-id-din, who was likely buried here. An erroneous legend soon appeared which claimed that the Sufi mystic and disciple of Ibn Arabi, Sadreddin Konevi, was buried there. This untrue legend had even made its way into the Salname-i Vilayet-i Erzurum, a history book on Erzurum. Hence, the tomb became known as Sadrettin Konevi Türbesi.

=== Modern history ===
The mausoleum fell into disrepair over the years. It was restored in 1954, with some funding from the Directorate General of Foundations.

== Architecture ==
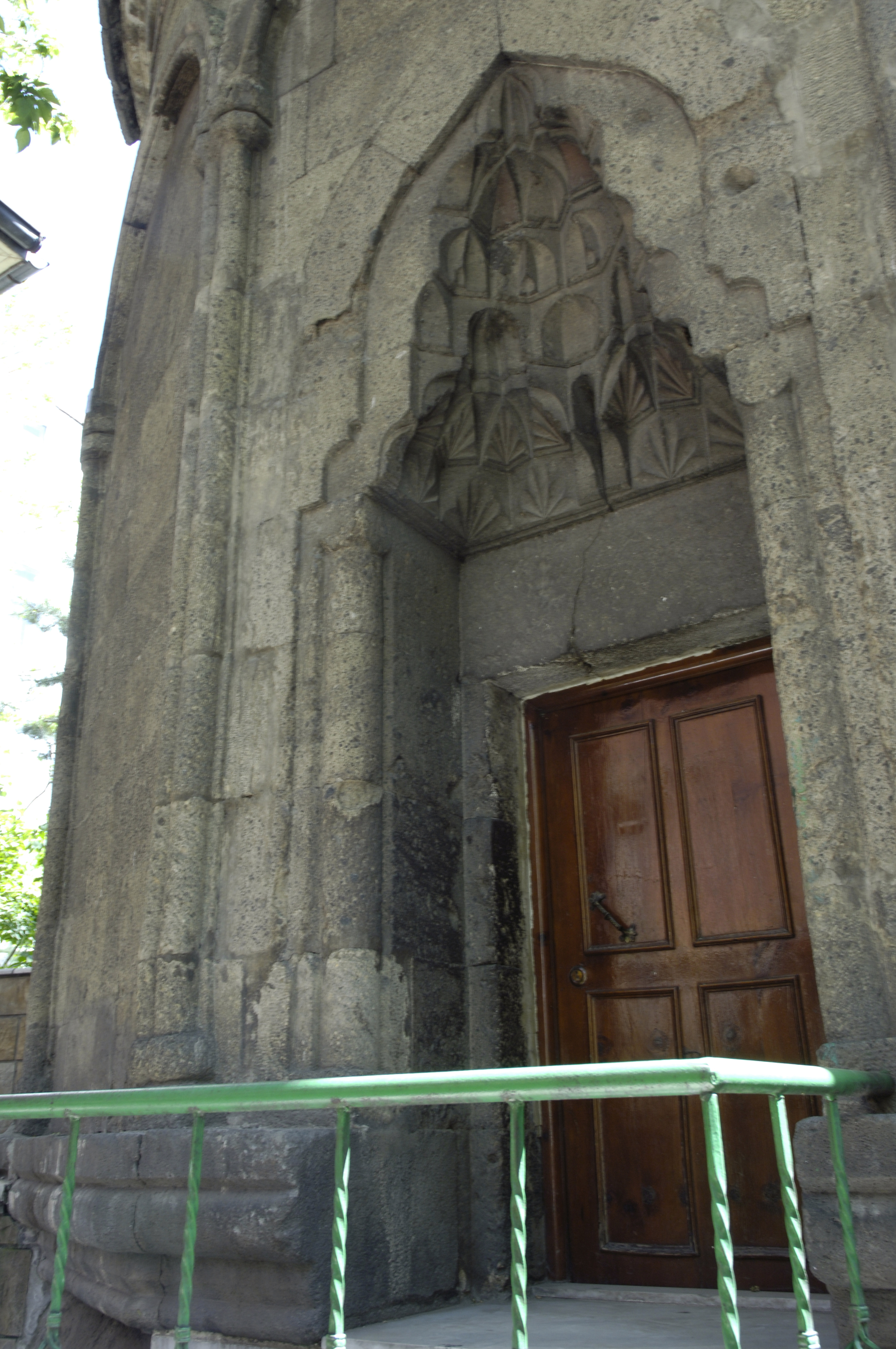
The entrance, showing off some muqarnas detail

The overall architectural style of the mausoleum is classified as being in the style of Seljuk architecture. The mausoleum has two levels, the actual graves are on an underground level, visible through an air vent at ground level. A normal dome, covered by a conical one, tops the structure. Muqarnas work is present inside the building, such as the upper half of the entrance's doorway. Stone is used primarily to construct the mausoleum.

== Gallery ==
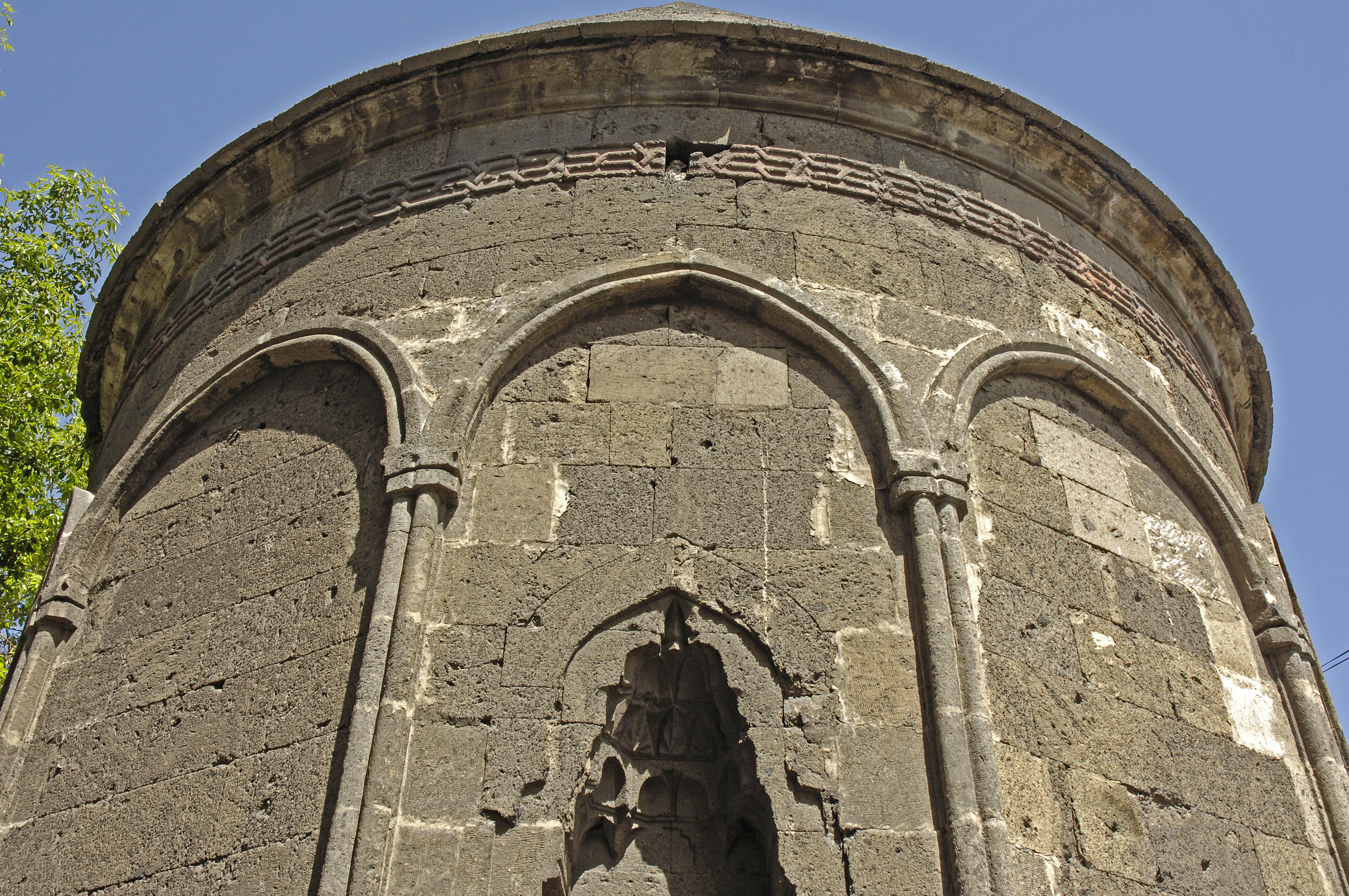
Closeup of the top half of the mausoleum

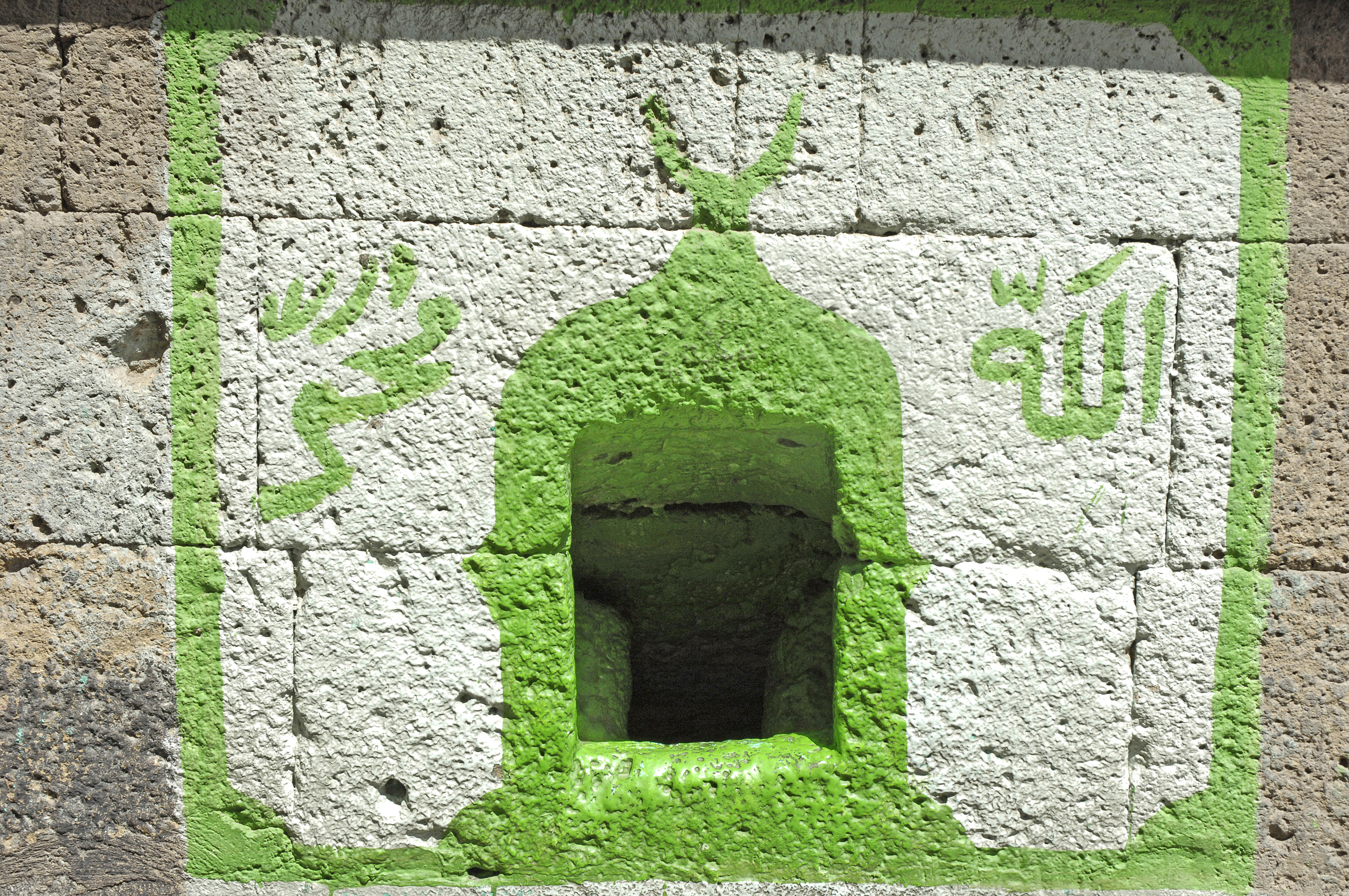
The air vent which allows one to see the much larger rooms underground (where the real graves can be seen)

== See also ==
- Türbe
- Islam in Turkey
