= Ayhan Songar =

Turkish academic and psychiatrist (1926–1997)

- Born: 1926; Gönen, Ottoman Empire
- Died: 2 July 1997 (aged 70–71); Istanbul, Turkey
- Burial place: Zincirlikuyu Cemetery, Istanbul
- Education: Istanbul University
- Years active: 1950s–1990s
- Spouse: Reyhan Songar
- Children: 1
- Awards: Member of the New York Academy of Sciences
- Medical career
- Profession: Physician
- Institutions: Istanbul University
- Sub-specialties: Psychiatry
- Website: https://ayhansongar.org/

Ayhan Songar (1926–1997) was a Turkish academic and psychiatrist. He is also known for his activities in sufism, music, cybernetics and photography. He was part of the conservative think thank Intellectuals' Hearth (IH) and headed the Green Crescent.

== Early life and education ==
He was born in Gönen, Balıkesir, in 1926. His father was colonel Nazmi who participated in the Turkish War of Independence, and his mother, Fevziye Peyman Hanım, was a niece of Rahime Perestu Sultan who was the spouse of the Ottoman Sultan Abdulmejid I.

Songar graduated from the Faculty of Medicine at Istanbul University in 1950 and completed his training in psychiatry in 1953. One of his lecturers was Mazhar Osman.

== Career and activities ==
Following his graduation Songar joined his alma mater as a research assistant. He was promoted to associate professor in 1956 and became a full professor in 1962. He founded the Department of Psychiatry of the Cerrahpaşa Faculty of Medicine at Istanbul University. He headed the department for thirty four years. He employed Turkish classical music to cure his patients and founded a music therapy unit in the clinic at the university. He taught psychiatry, parapsychology, cybernetics and biophysics in the Faculty of Medicine.

Songar became a member of the conservative think thank called Thinkers Club (Turkish: Aydınlar Kulübü) in 1962 which was the precursor of the IH. He was among the founders of the IH and served as its acting president between 24 December 1982 and 4 April 1984. He was also a member of the Association for the Expansion of Knowledge (Turkish: Ilim Yayma Cemiyeti) which publicized the Turkish–Islamic synthesis developed by the IH.

Songar was the head of the Observation Specialization Department at the Forensic Medicine Institute and was also a member of the Turkish Radio and Television Corporation's board of directors. As of 1988 he was the president of the Turkish Psychological Association.

Songar was involved in the establishment of the Turkish Literature Foundation. He served as the president of the Green Crescent.

Songar published a weekly column in the daily newspaper Tercüman from 1986 and then contributed to the Türkiye newspaper where he first wrote weekly from 1989 and daily from 1991 to 1997. He was also among the contributors of the Hareket magazine. He played the oud and oboe, and wrote lyrics. He was author of many books which are about diverse topics such as cybernetics, energy and life.

=== Views ===
Songar was a follower of the neo-spiritualism and was influenced from the views of Bedri Ruhselman, founder of the movement in Turkey. Songar argued that cybernetics was consistent with the Islamic worldview and that it could employed to reduce the radicalism in Turkish society. For him cybernetic psychiatry was one of the ways to reveal criminal intent among individuals and to eliminate the motivations of political violence, as he claimed that political violence was a psychiatric issue.

== Personal life and death ==
Songar's wife, Reyhan Songar, was also a physician. They had a daughter.

Songar was diagnosed with prostate cancer in early 1997. One of his visitors on his deathbed was Recep Tayyip Erdoğan who was serving as the mayor of Istanbul. Songar died of this illness in Istanbul on 2 July 1997. He was buried in the Zincirlikuyu Cemetery next day.

=== Awards and honors ===
Songar was awarded by the National Culture Foundation in 1979 and in 1981. He was made a member of the New York Academy of Sciences in 1992.
