= Islam in Turkey =

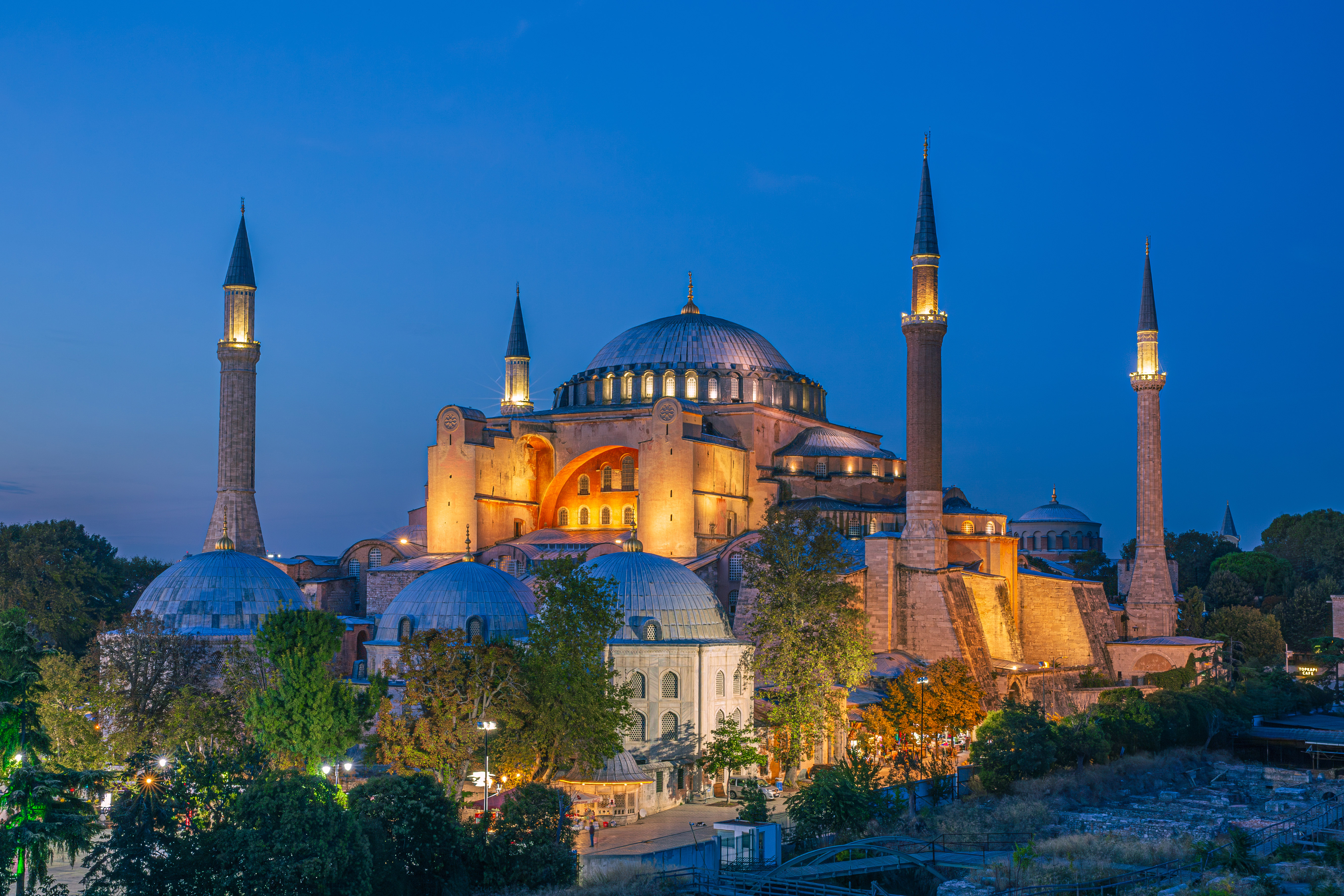
- Hagia Sophia the most popular mosque in Istanbul, It was formerly a church and a museum as well

Total population
- ▲83,600,000

Religions
- Majority Sunni Islam

Languages
- Liturgical: Quranic Arabic; Common Turkish

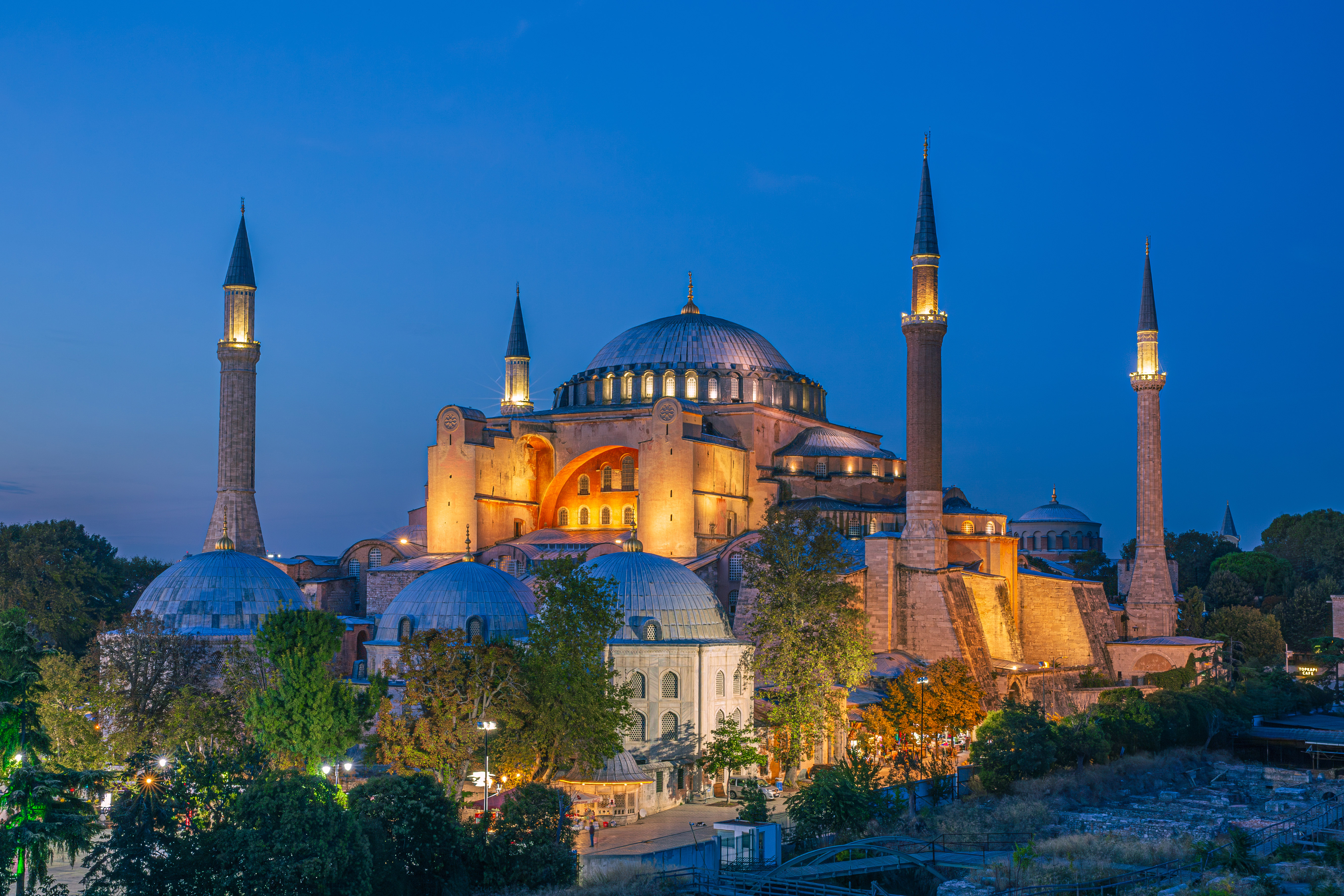
Hagia Sophia, a mosque since 1453 that serves as an important cultural and historical site in Istanbul, Turkey. It was originally the most important church in the Byzantine Empire and the Eastern Orthodox Church.

Islam is by far the most practiced religion in Turkey. Most Turkish people are Sunni Muslims, and most of them belong to the Hanafi school of jurisprudence. Smaller numbers belong to the Alevi, Ja'fari and Alawite minorities. The established presence of Islam in the region that now constitutes modern Turkey dates back to the second half of the 11th century, when the Seljuks started expanding into eastern Anatolia.

While official records indicate the population of Turkey to be 99.8% Muslim, (Note: These are based on the existing religion information written on every citizen's national ID card, automatically passed on from the parents to every newborn, and do not necessarily represent individual choice. Furthermore, anyone who was not officially registered as Christian or Jewish by the time of the foundation of the republic, was automatically recorded as Muslim, and this label has been passed down to new generations. Therefore, the official number of Muslims also includes people with no religion; converted from Islam to a different religion than Islam; and anyone who is of a different religion than their parents but hasn't applied for a change of their individual records.) most surveys estimate the percentage to be around 90 to 95%. Because the government registers everyone as Muslim at birth by default, the official statistics can be misleading.

The Hanafi school of fiqh (maddhab) of Sunni Islam makes up about 90% of the Muslim population, with the remaining Muslim sects consisting of Alevis (close to 10%), Ja'faris (representing 1%) and Alawites (with an estimated population of around 500,000 to 1 million, or about 1%). With a sizeable part of population being Cultural Muslims, there is also a minority of Sufi and non-denominational Muslims.

Whether "Turkish Islam" is more "moderate and pluralistic" compared to other Islamic societies is disputed, with a majority claiming this to be true. Reasons given for this statement include: the state constitution not containing any references to Islam, alcohol consumption being prevalent, and instead of promoting religious activities there was a state-imposed ban on Islamic attire and restrictions on religious activities until the late 2010s. Others argue this view is not valid, pointing to the fact that many elements of Turkish society are hardliners.

== History ==
=== Seljuks and initial history ===
Islamic conquest extended to Anatolia during later Abbasid period.

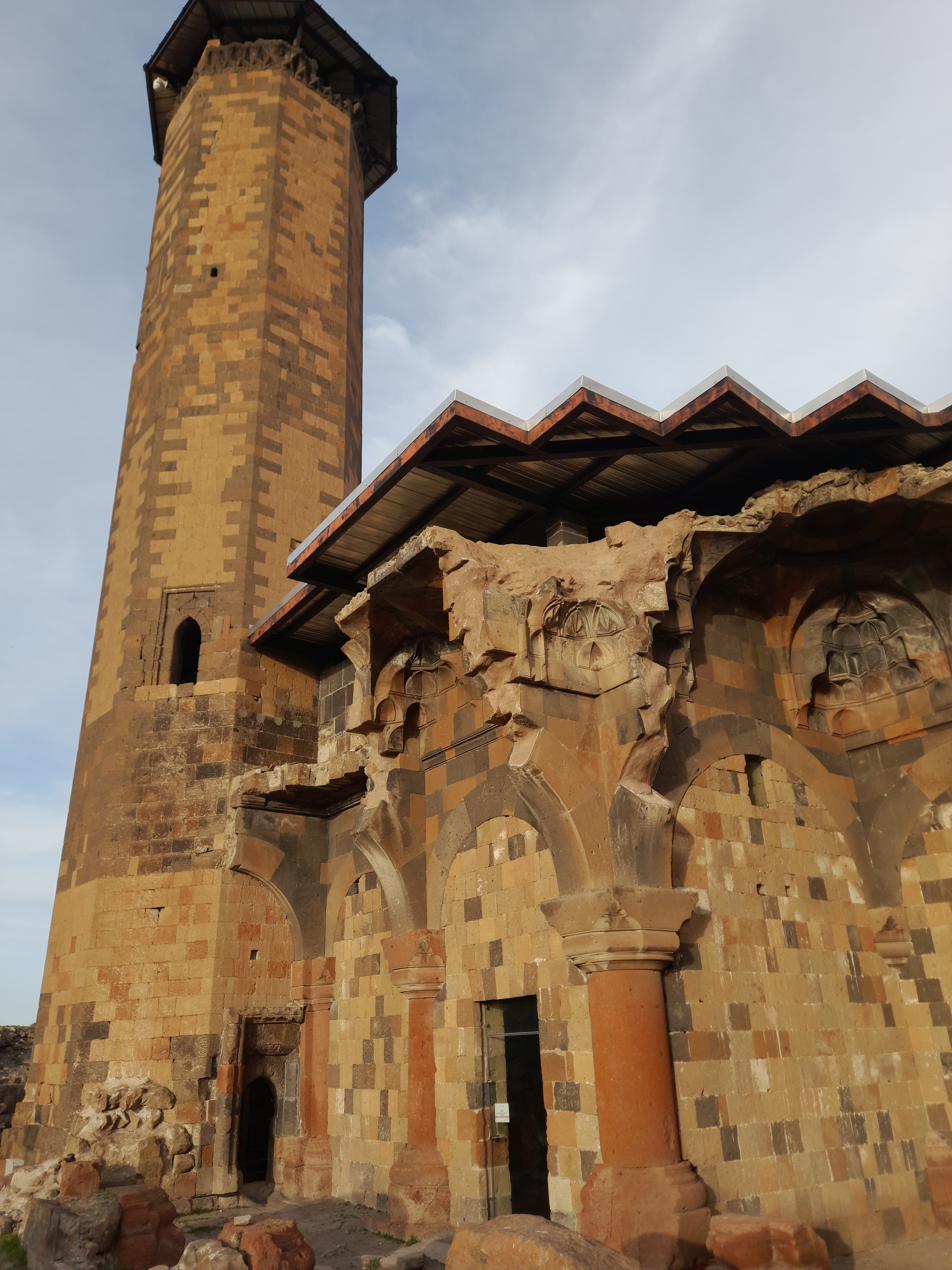
Menucihr Mosque in Kars, the first mosque within the borders of modern Turkey

During the Muslim conquests of the 7th and early 8th centuries, Arab armies established the Islamic Empire. The Umayyad Caliphate continued the spread of Islam. The Islamic Golden Age was soon inaugurated by the middle of the 8th century by the ascension of the Abbasid Caliphate and the transfer of the capital from Damascus to Baghdad.

The later period saw initial expansion and the capture of Crete (840). The Abbasids soon shifted their attention towards the East. During the later fragmentation of the Abbasid rule and the rise of their Shiite rivals the Fatimids and Buyids, a resurgent Byzantium recaptured Crete and Cilicia in 961, Cyprus in 965, and pushed into the Levant by 975. The Byzantines successfully contested with the Fatimids for influence in the region until the arrival of the Seljuk Turks who first allied with the Abbasids and then ruled as the de facto rulers.

In 1068, Alp Arslan and allied Turkoman tribes recaptured many Abbasid lands and even invaded Byzantine regions, pushing further into eastern and central Anatolia after a major victory at the Battle of Manzikert in 1071. The disintegration of the Seljuk dynasty resulted in the rise of subsequent, smaller, rival Turkic kingdoms such as the Danishmends, the Sultanate of Rum, and various Atabegs who contested the control of the region during the Crusades and incrementally expanded across Anatolia until the rise of the Ottoman Empire.

=== Ottoman Empire ===
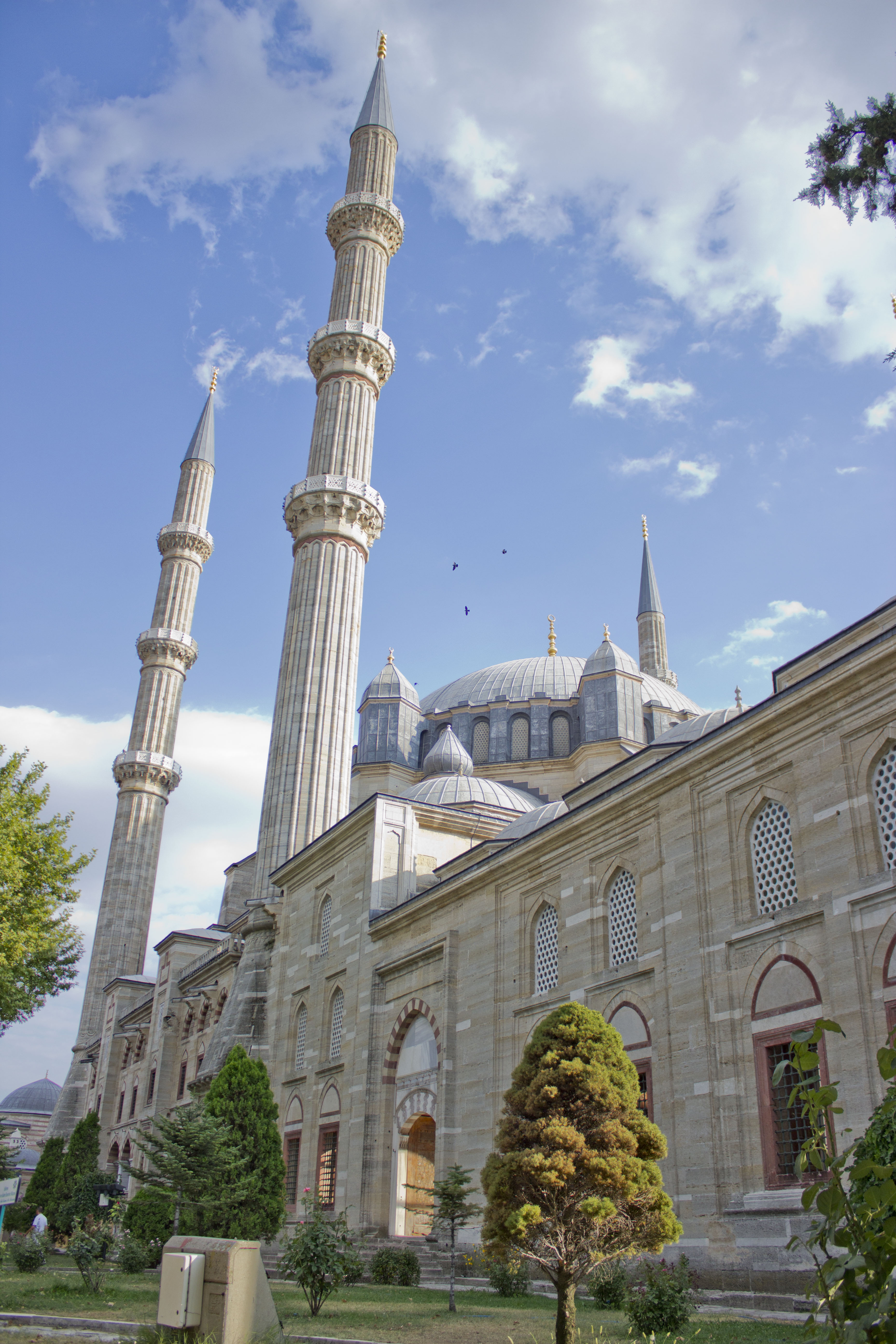
Selimiye Mosque, Edirne.

Beginning in the 12th century, new waves of Turkic migrants arrived, many of whom belonging to Sufi orders. Some of these migrants later went on to incorporate heterodox beliefs. One Sufi order that appealed to Turks in Anatolia was the Safaviyya, an order that was originally Sunni and non-political, but later became both Shi'a and politically based in northwest Iran. During the 14th and 15th centuries, the Safavid and similar orders such as the Bektaşi became rivals of the Ottomans—who were orthodox Sunni Muslims—for political control of eastern Anatolia. Although the Bektaşi order became accepted as a sect of orthodox Sunni Muslims, they did not abandon their heterodox beliefs. In contrast, the Safavids eventually conquered Iran, spread their beliefs, and became proponents of orthodox Twelver Shi'a Islam.

The conquest of the Byzantine capital of Constantinople (modern day Istanbul) in 1453 enabled the Ottomans to consolidate their empire in Anatolia and Thrace. The Ottomans later revived the title of caliph during the reign of Selim I. Despite the absence of a formal institutional structure, Sunni religious functionaries continued to play an important political role. In theory, the codified system of sharia regulated all aspects of everyday life, at least for Muslim subjects of the empire. The head of the judiciary ranked directly below the sultan, and was second in power only to the grand vizier. Early in the Ottoman period, the office of grand mufti of Istanbul evolved into that of Şeyhülislam (shaykh, or "leader of Islam"), which had ultimate jurisdiction over all the courts in the empire and consequently exercised authority over the interpretation and application of sharia. Legal opinions pronounced by the Şeyhülislam were considered definitive interpretations.

=== Republic of Turkey ===
==== One-party period ====
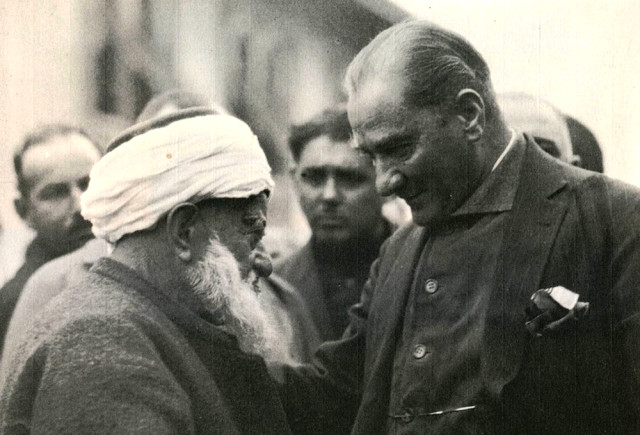
President Mustafa Kemal Pasha and Mufti Abdurrahman Kamil Effendi in Amasya (1930)

The secularization of Turkey started during the last years of the Ottoman Empire and was a prominent feature of Atatürk's reforms. Secularism (or laiklik) became one of the "Six Arrows" of Atatürk's program for remaking Turkey. Under his leadership, in 1922, the caliphate was abolished, and the secular power of religious authorities and functionaries was reduced and eventually eliminated. Religious foundations were nationalized. The influential and popular orders of the dervish brotherhoods (Tariqa) were also suppressed.

In 1922, the new nationalist regime abolished the Ottoman sultanate, as well as the caliphate in 1924 - the religious office that Ottoman sultans had held for four centuries. Thus, for the first time in Islamic history, no ruler claimed spiritual leadership of Islam.

Atatürk and his associates abolished certain religious practices and institutions and generally questioned the value of religion, preferring to place their trust in science. They regarded organized religion as an anachronism and contrasted it unfavorably with "civilization", which to them meant a rationalist, secular culture. Unlike in the West, the establishment of secularism in Turkey was not a gradual process of separation of mosque and state.

In the Ottoman Empire, all residents, at least theoretically, had been subject to traditional religious law, and Sunni religious organizations had been part of the state structure. However, the state usually had authority over the clergy and religious law (e.g. many Sultans are known to change Şeyhülislams, who do not approve of state politics). When the reformers of the early 1920s opted for a secular state, they removed religion from the sphere of public policy and restricted it to exclusively that of personal morals, behavior, and faith. Although private observance of religious rituals could continue, religion and religious organization were excluded from public life.

In addition to the abolition of the caliphate, new laws mandated the abolition of the office of Şeyhülislam and the religious hierarchy, the closing and confiscation of Sufi lodges, meeting places, and monasteries and the outlawing of their rituals and meetings, the establishment of government control over vakıfs which had been inalienable under Sharia, the replacement of sharia with adapted European legal codes; the closing of religious schools; the abandonment of the Islamic calendar in favor of the Gregorian calendar used in the West, and restrictions on public attire that had religious associations, with the fez outlawed for men and the veil discouraged for women.

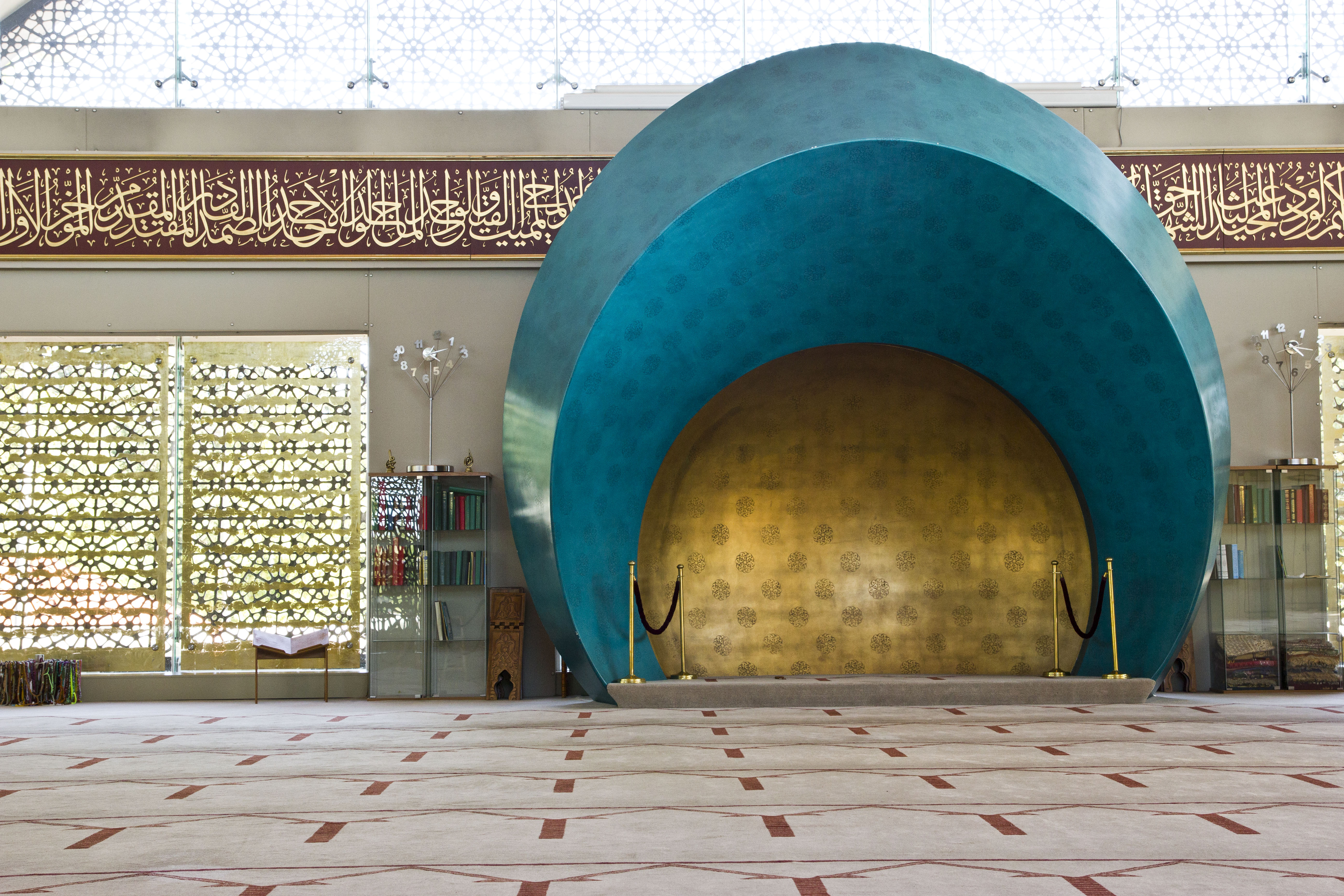
Şakirin Mosque in Istanbul. The mosque was designed by Zeynep Fadıllıoğlu, the first woman to do so.

Atatürk and his colleagues also attempted to "turkify" Islam through official encouragement of practices such as the usage of Turkish rather than Arabic at devotions, substituting the Turkish word Tanrı for the Arabic word Allah, and incorporating Turkish into daily calls to prayer. These changes in devotional practices caused widespread criticism among Muslims, which led to a return to the Arabic version of the call to prayer in 1950, after the opposition party DP won the elections. Of longer-lasting effect were the regime's measures of prohibiting religious education, restricting the building of new mosques, and transferring existing mosques to secular purposes - most notably the Hagia Sophia (Justinian's sixth-century Christian basilica, which had been converted into a mosque by Mehmet II), which was turned into a museum in 1935. Muftis and imams were appointed by the government, and religious instruction was taken over by the Ministry of National Education. As a result of these policies, the Turkish Republic was judged negatively by some sections of the Muslim world.

The common expectation was that these policies of the 1920s and 1930s would diminish the role of religion in public, which, however, did not occur. As early as 1925, religious grievances were one of the principal causes of the Şeyh Sait rebellion, an uprising in southeastern Turkey that may have claimed as many as 30,000 lives before being suppressed.

Although Turkey was secularized at a legal level, religion remained a strong force. After 1950, some political leaders espoused support for programs and policies that appealed to the religiously inclined in an attempt to benefit from a lot of the population's attachment to religion. Such efforts were opposed by most of the state, who believed that secularism was an essential principle of Kemalist Ideology. This gradually led to a polarization of the entire country, which became especially evident in the 1980s, as a new generation of religiously motivated local leaders emerged to challenge the dominance of the secularized political elite.

==== Multi-party period ====
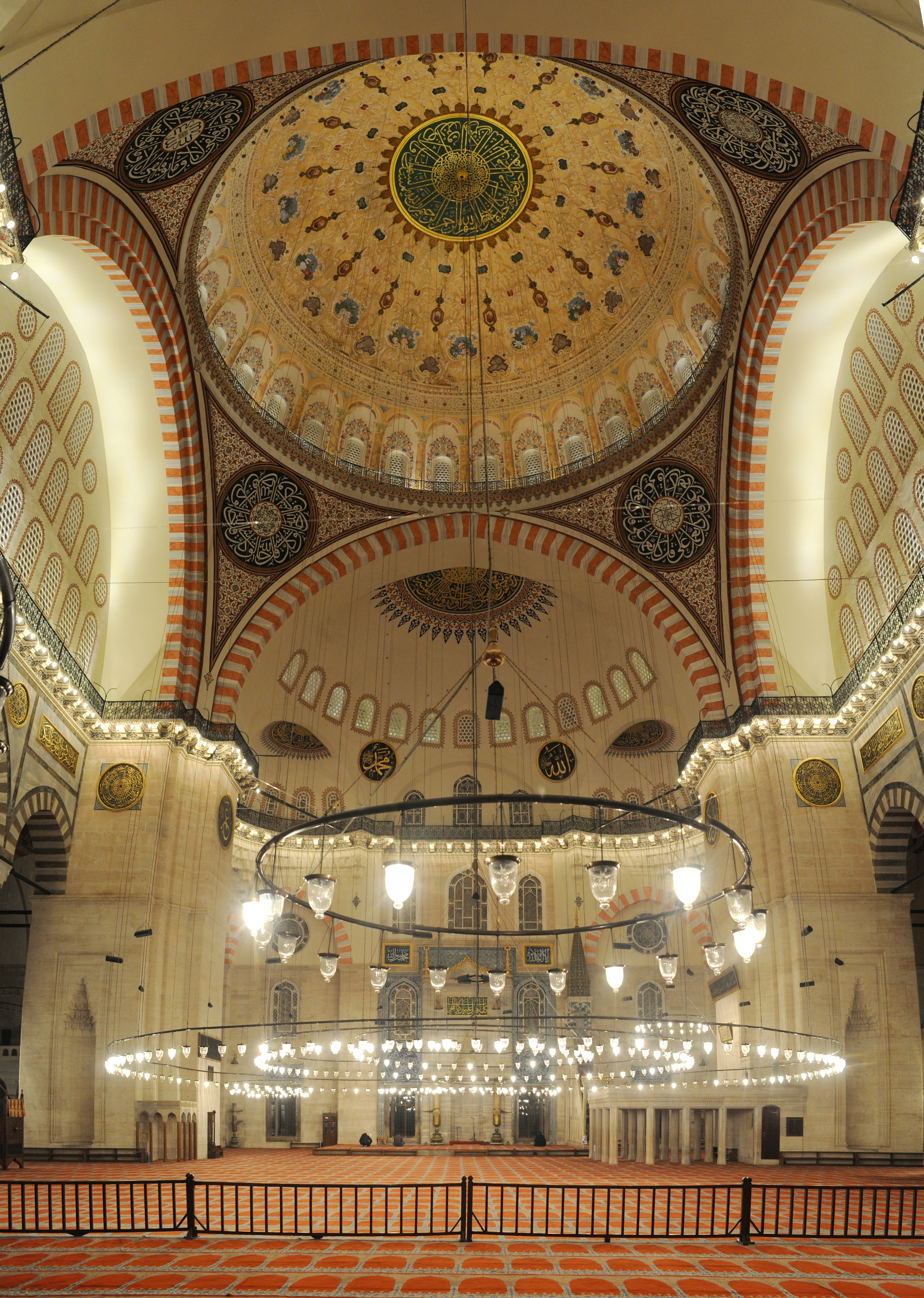
Süleymaniye Mosque, Istanbul.

Following the loosening of authoritarian political control in 1946, a large number of people began to openly call for a return to traditional religious practices. During the 1950s, even certain political leaders found it expedient to join religious leaders in advocating more state respect for religion.

A more direct manifestation of the growing reaction against secularism was the revival of the Sufi brotherhoods. Not only did suppressed Sufi orders such as the Kadiri, Mevlevi, Nakşibendi, Khālidiyyā and Al-Ṭarīqah al-Tijāniyyah reemerge, but new movements were formed, including the Nur Cemaati, Gülen movement, Sülaymānīyyā, Community of İskenderpaşa and İsmailağa. The Tijāni became especially militant in confronting the state, damaging monuments to Atatürk to symbolize their opposition to his policy of secularization. This was, however, an isolated incident and only involved one particular Sheikh of the order. Throughout the 1950s, there were numerous trials of Ticani and other Sufi leaders for anti-state activities.

Simultaneously, some movements, notably the Süleymancı and Nurcular, cooperated with those politicians perceived as supportive of pro-Islamic policies. The Nurcular eventually advocated support for Turkey's multi-party political system, and one of its offshoots, the Gülen movement, had supported the True Path Party while the Işıkçılar and Enver Ören had openly supported the Motherland Party since the mid-1980s.

The demand for restoration of religious education in public schools began in the late 1940s. The government initially responded by authorizing religious instruction in state schools for those students whose parents requested it. Under the rule of the Democrat Party during the 1950s, religious education was made compulsory in secondary schools unless parents made a specific request to have their children excused. Religious education was made compulsory for all primary and secondary school children in 1982.

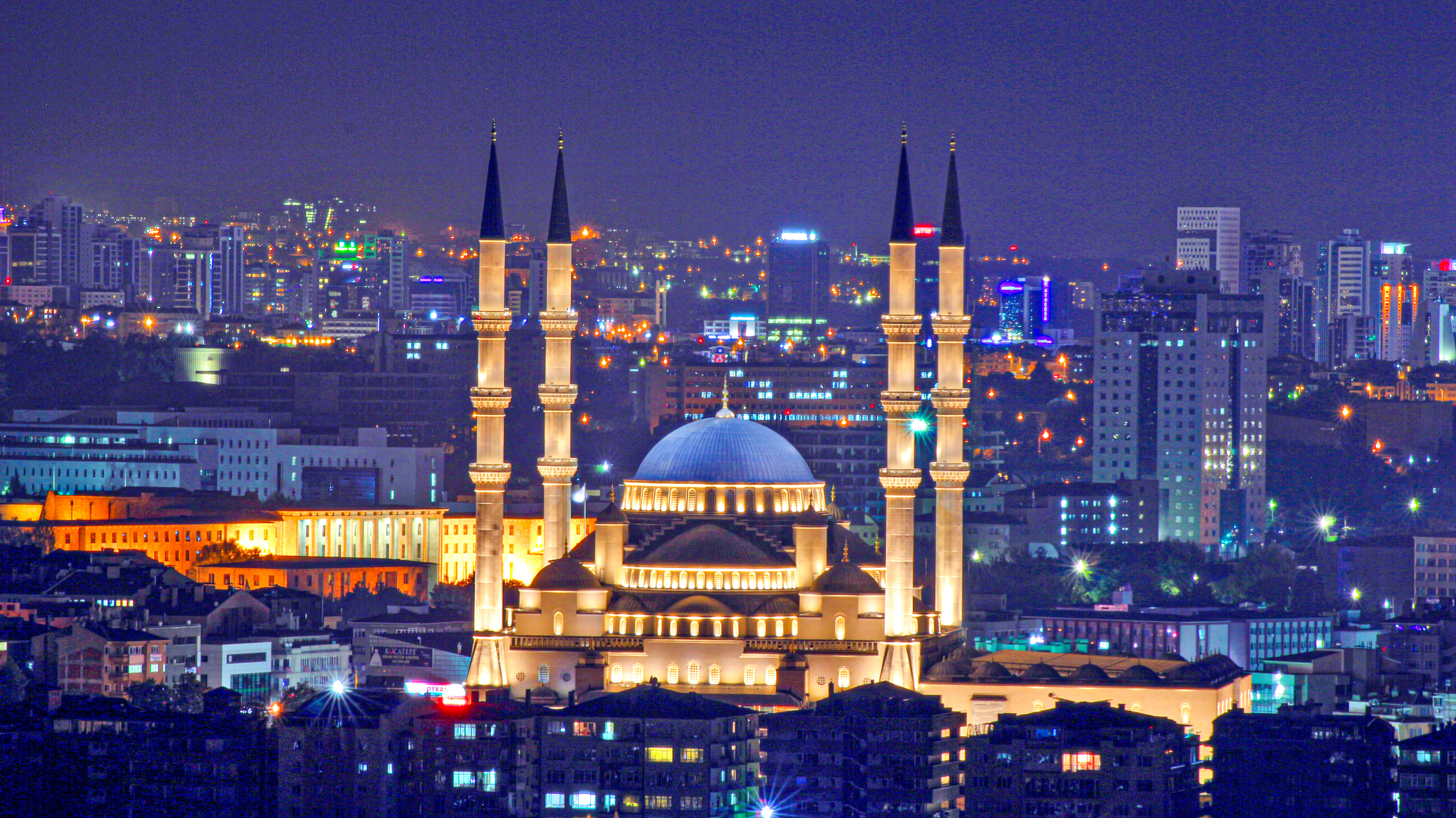
Kocatepe Mosque, Ankara.

The reintroduction of religion into the school curriculum raised the question of religious higher education. The seculars believed that Islam could be "reformed" if future leaders were trained in state-controlled seminaries. To further this goal, the government in 1949 established a faculty of divinity at Ankara University to train teachers of Islam and imams. In 1951 the Democrat Party government set up special secondary schools (İmam Hatip schools) for the training of imams and preachers. The number of these schools expanded rapidly to over 250 during the 1970s, when the pro-Islam National Salvation Party participated in coalition governments. Following the 1980 coup, the military, although secular in orientation, viewed religion as an effective means to counter socialist ideas and thus authorized the construction of 90 more İmam Hatip high schools.

During the 1970s and 1980s, Islam experienced political rehabilitation due to center-right secular leaders perceiving religion as a potential bulwark in their ideological struggle with center-left secular leaders. A small advocacy group that became extremely influential was the Intellectuals' Hearth (Turkish: Aydınlar Ocağı), an organization that holds the beliefs that true Turkish culture is a synthesis of the Turks' pre-Islamic traditions and Islam. According to the Hearth, Islam not only constitutes an essential aspect of Turkish culture, but is a force that can be regulated by the state to help socialize the people to be obedient citizens acquiescent to the overall secular order. After the 1980 coup, many of the Hearth's proposals for restructuring schools, colleges, and state broadcasting were adopted. The result was a purge from these state institutions of more than 2,000 intellectuals perceived as espousing leftist ideas incompatible with the Hearth's vision of Turkey's national culture.

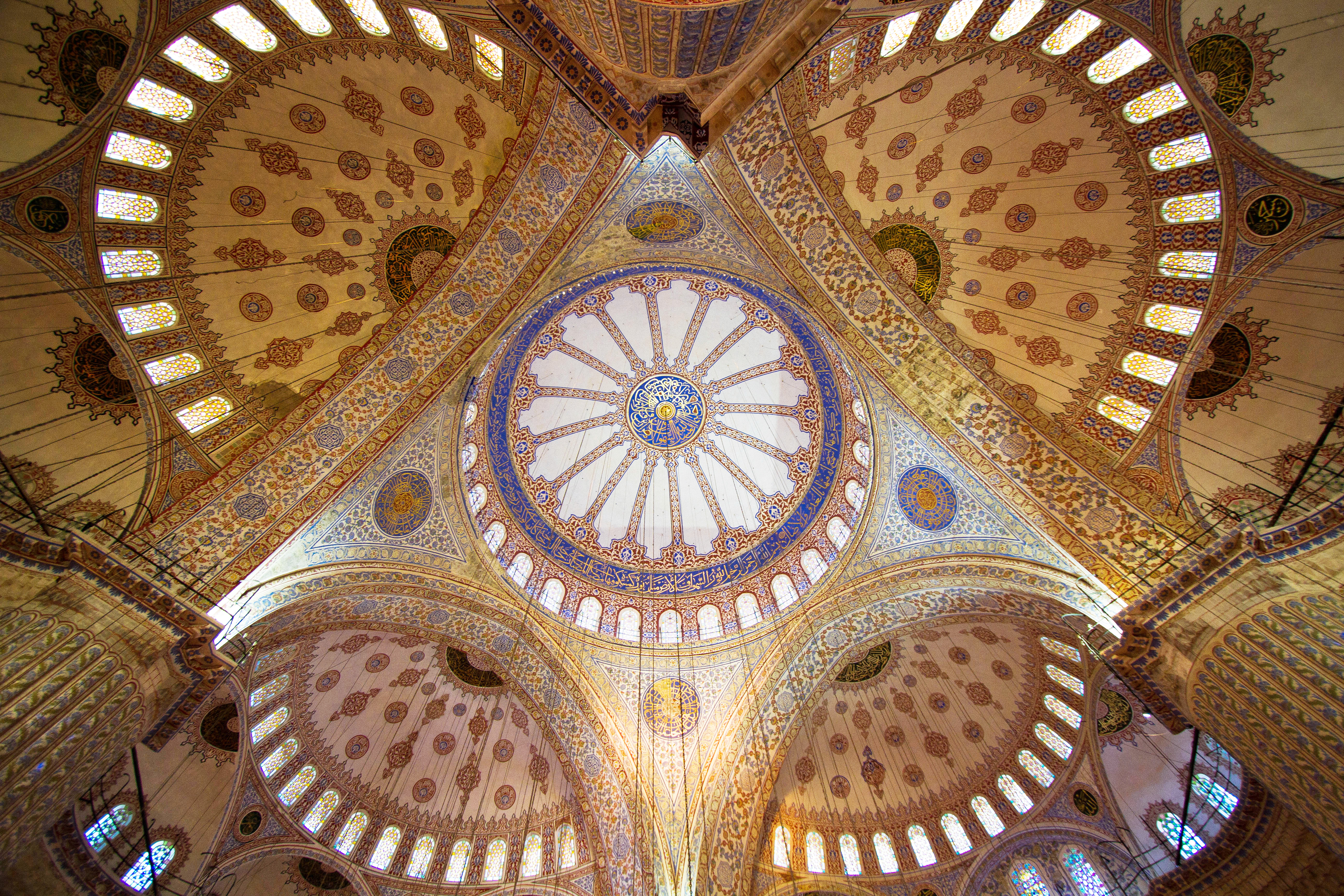
Interior of the Sultan Ahmed Mosque, Istanbul, built in 1616.

The state's more tolerant attitude toward Islam encouraged the proliferation of private religious activities, including the construction of new mosques and Qur'an schools in the cities, the establishment of Islamic centers for research on and conferences about Islam and its role in Turkey, and the establishment of religiously oriented professional and women's journals. The printing of newspapers, the publication of religious books, and the growth of innumerable religious projects ranging from health centers, child-care facilities, and youth hostels to financial institutions and consumer cooperatives flourished. When the government legalized private broadcasting after 1990, several Islamic radio stations were organized. In the summer of 1994, the first Islamic television station, Kanal 7, began broadcasting, first in Istanbul and then in Ankara.

Although the tarikah have played a seminal role in Turkey's religious revival and in the mid-1990s still published, several of the country's most widely circulated religious journals and newspapers, a new phenomenon, İslamcı Aydın (the Islamist intellectual), unaffiliated with the traditional Sufi orders, emerged during the 1980s. Prolific and popular writers such as Ali Bulaç, Rasim Özdenören, and İsmet Özel drew upon their knowledge of Western philosophy, Marxist sociology, and radical Islamist political theory to advocate for a modern Islamic perspective that does not hesitate to criticize societal issues while simultaneously remaining faithful to the ethical values and spiritual dimensions of religion. Islamist intellectuals are harshly critical of Turkey's secular intellectuals, whom they fault for trying to do in Turkey what Western intellectuals did in Europe: substitute worldly materialism, in its capitalist or socialist version, for religious values.

By 1994, slogans promising that a return to Islam would cure economic ills and solve the problems of bureaucratic inefficiencies had enough general appeal to enable avowed religious candidates to win mayoral elections in Istanbul and Ankara.

On 15 July 2016, a coup d'état was attempted in Turkey against state institutions by a faction within the Turkish Armed Forces with connections to the Gülen movement, citing an erosion in secularism.

==== Issues ====
===== Diyanet and secularism =====
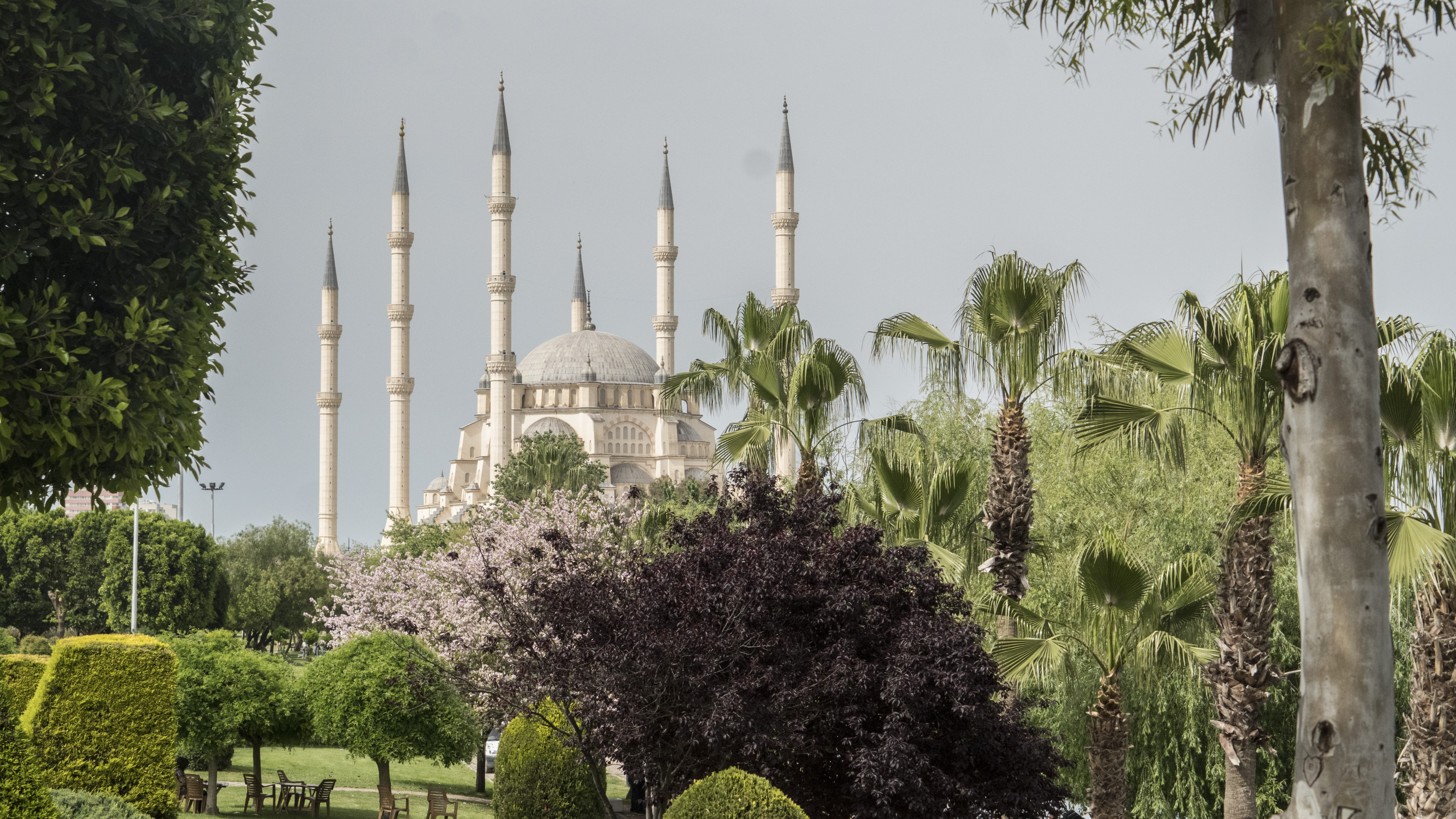
Sabancı Merkez Camii, Adana, built in 1998, It was the largest mosque in Turkey when it was built.

The main religious administration called Presidency of Religious Affairs, or by its local shortened form, 'Diyanet' manages 85,000 mosques and employs all of the imams in Turkey. This state agency, established by Atatürk in 1924, finances only Sunni Muslim worship. Other religions must ensure a financially self-sustaining running and they face administrative obstacles during operation.

When collecting tax, all Turkish citizens are equal. The tax rate is not based on religion. However, through the Diyanet, Turkish citizens are not equal in the use of revenue.

The 1942 wealth tax in Turkey was selective according to religion as non-Muslims were taxed far higher than Muslims, forcing them to suffer severe poverty and imprisonment and slavery for those who could not afford to pay it.

===== Headscarf controversy =====
Do you cover when going outside?
	2011	2021
No, I do not	37%	41%
Yes, I wear a headscarf	53%	48%
Yes, I wear a türban	9%	10%
Yes, I wear a çarşaf	1%	1%

Although intellectual debates on the role of Islam attracted widespread interest, they did not provoke the kind of controversy that erupted over the issue of appropriate attire for Muslim women. During the early 1980s, female college students who were determined to demonstrate their commitment to Islam began to cover their heads and necks with scarves and wear long, shape-concealing overcoats. The appearance of these women in the citadels of Turkish secularism shocked those men and women who tended to perceive such attire as a symbol of the Islamic traditionalism they rejected. Militant secularists persuaded the Higher Education Council to issue a regulation in 1987 forbidding female university students to cover their heads in class. Protests by thousands of religious students and some university professors forced several universities to waive enforcement of the dress code. The issue continued to be seriously divisive in the mid-1990s. Throughout the first half of the 1990s, highly educated, articulate but religiously pious women have appeared in public dressed in Islamic attire that conceals all but their faces and hands. Other women, especially in Ankara, Istanbul, and İzmir, have demonstrated against such attire by wearing revealing fashions and Atatürk badges. The issue is discussed and debated in almost every type of forum – artistic, commercial, cultural, economic, political, and religious. For many citizens of Turkey, women's dress has become the issue that defines whether a Muslim is secularist or religious. In 2010, the Turkish Higher Educational council (YÖK) lifted the ban on headscarves at the universities. Since the start of his presidency, President Recep Tayyip Erdogan has drastically increased the amount of religious high schools across Turkey to support his plan on bringing up a more pious generation. However, this push on piousness in school children seems to have had an adverse effect, for there is anecdotal evidence of a notable number of Turkish students from religious high schools admitting their loss of faith in Islamic beliefs, which has caused substantial amount of discussion among politicians and religious clerics.

More recently in 2016, Turkey approved hijab as the part of the official police uniform. For the first time, female officers will be able to cover their heads with a headscarf under their police caps. This act was pushed by President Recep Tayyip Erdogan's Islamist-rooted Justice and Development Party (AKP) that have been pushing for relaxed restrictions on the hijab.

== Denominations ==
Situation of the denominations of Islam in Turkey
Religions	Estimated population	Expropriation measures	Official recognition through the Constitution or international treaties	Government Financing of places of worship and religious staff
Sunni Islam - Hanafi & Shafi'i	more than 85%	No	Yes through the Diyanet mentioned in the Constitution (art.136)	Yes through the Diyanet
Shia&Sufi Islam - Alevi/Bektashi	around 10%	Yes	Yes, through Ministry of Culture and Tourism.	Only by local municipalities.
Shia Islam - Ja'fari	~1%		No	No
Shia Islam - Alawites	~1%		No	No
Non-denominational Muslim	~2%	-	-	-

=== Sunni Islam ===
The vast majority of the present-day Turkish people are Muslim and the Sunni Islam is the most populous Islamic sect, comprising about 90% of the Muslims in the country. The most popular school of law is the Hanafite madh'hab of Sunni Islam. The Hanafi madhhab was the official school of Islamic jurisprudence espoused by the Ottoman Empire and a 2013 survey conducted by the Turkish Directorate of Religious Affairs indicates that 77.5% of Turkish Muslims identify themselves as Hanafis. Another common Sunni jurisprudence, Shafi'i is the dominant one in Turkish Kurdistan. Although the Maturidi and Ash'ari schools of Islamic theology (which apply Ilm al-Kalam or rational thought to understand the Quran and the hadith) have been the dominant creeds in Turkey due to their widespread acceptance and propagation since the beginning of the Ottoman Empire, the Athari (literalist) creed of the Salafi movement has seen increasing acceptance.

Compared to the Hanbali school of Islam, the Hanafi school of Islam takes a more liberal take on the religion, allowing for a more lenient interpretation of religious law.

=== Shia Islam ===
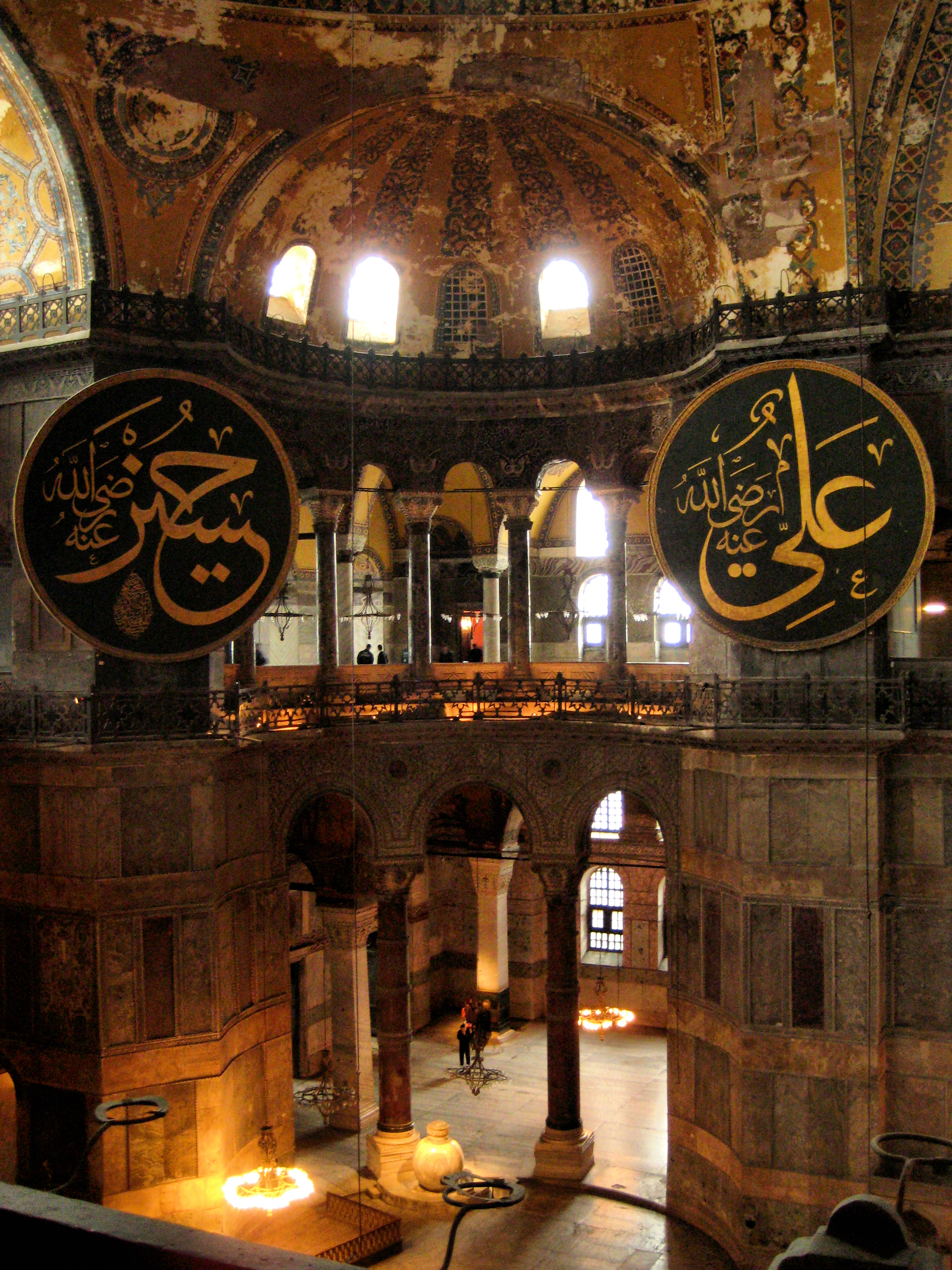
Ali ibn Abu Talib at right and Husayn ibn Ali at left in Hagia Sophia

The Shia Muslim population of Turkey is composed of several schools -- the Twelver branch with Ja'fari aqidah and fiqh, Batiniyya-Sufism aqidah of Maymūn’al-Qāddāhī fiqh of the Alevīs, and Cillī aqidah of Maymūn ibn Abu’l-Qāsim Sulaiman ibn Ahmad ibn at-Tabarānī fiqh of the Alawites. Altogether Shia are thought to constitute approximately one tenth of the population of the country.

==== Alevis ====
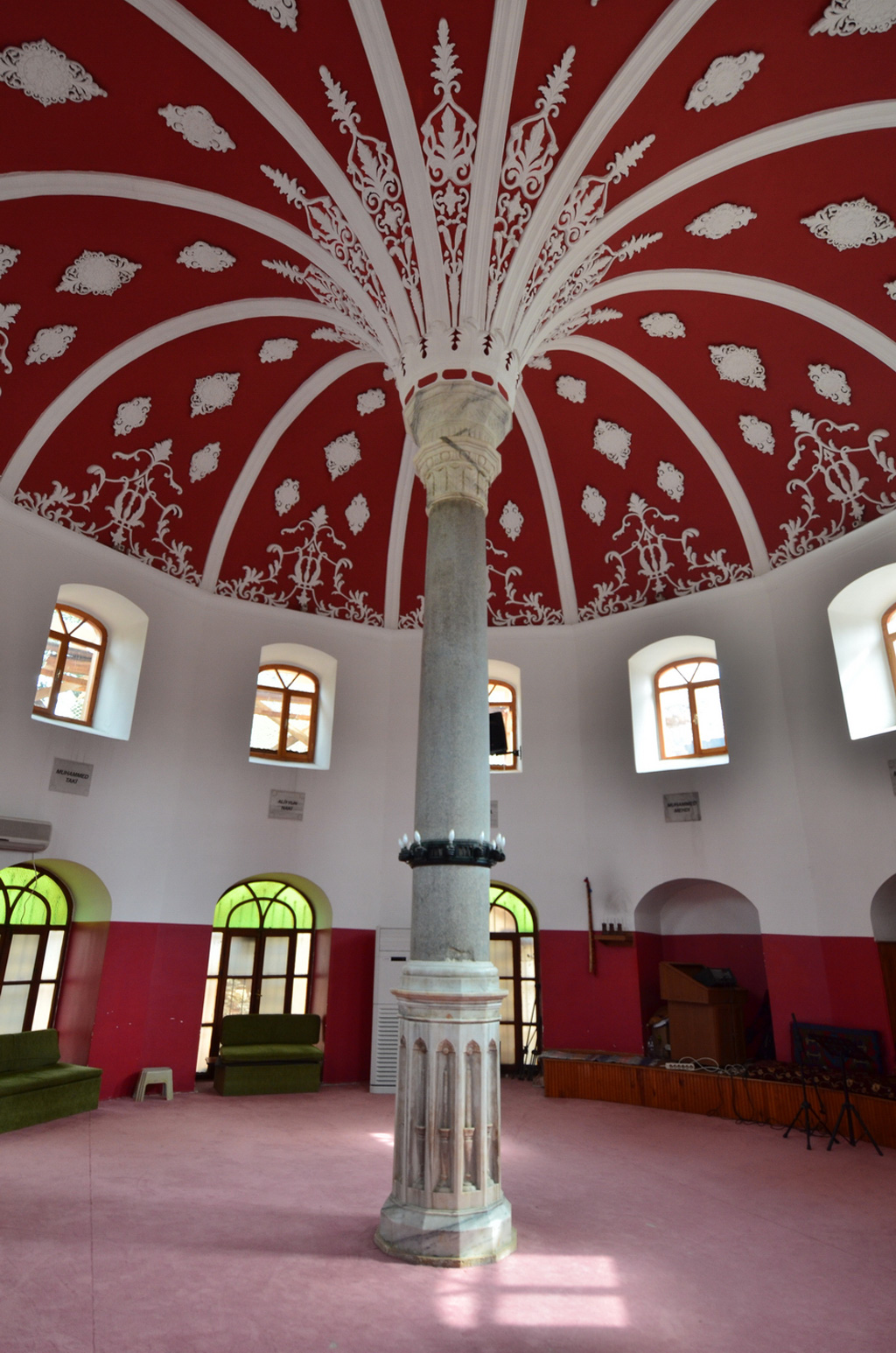
Interior of the historical Şahkulu Sultan Dergahi Cemevi in Kadıköy, Istanbul.

An estimate for the Turkish Alevi population varies from 3.5 million to 12 million. Complicating the making of an accurate estimate of the population of the different Shi'i sects or even distinguishing between them and is that in the Turkish language the term Aleviler rather than "Shi'a" has been frequently used to refer to Shi'a in general -- Alevi being the dominant Shia sect in the country. Other difficulties are that censuses conducted by the Turkish government do not ask about religious denominations; the secular tendencies of the Alevi population and oppression by Sunni Islamists, which causes most Alevis to hide their religious identity. Based on the few reliable surveys that have been conducted, ~10% is thought to be an adequate estimate.

Some of their members (or sub-groups, especially those belonging to Qizilbash and Hurufism) claim that God takes abode in the bodies of the human-beings (ḥulūl), believe in metempsychosis (tanāsukh), Some of the Alevis criticize the course of Islam as it is being practiced overwhelmingly by more than 99% of Sunni and Shia population. Regular daily salat and fasting in the holy month of Ramadan are not officially done by the Qizilbashs, Hurufis, and Ishikist groups. These members of Yazdânism like Ishikists and Yarsanis who portrayed themselves as Alevis, are frequently denounced by the Dedes.

The term Kızılbaş in the history was used pejoratively for all Shi'ites in Anatolia.

==== Ja'faris ====
The followers of the Ja'fari jurisprudence constitute the second sizable Shi'i community. It is historically the primary denomination of ethnic Azerbaijani people. Most of them live in the eastern provinces neighboring to Azerbaijan, more particularly in the Iğdır Province and Kars Province, but also larger cities in the west. It is estimated that Ja'faris make up 4% of the population of Turkey, i.e. about 3,300,000. They have 70 mosques in Istanbul and some 300 throughout the country and receive no state funding for their mosques and imams as the Presidency of Religious Affairs (Diyanet) is exclusively Sunni.

==== Alawites ====
The Alawite community in Turkey has an estimated population of around 1 million the majority of which live in the Province of Hatay. There they make up nearly half of the total population, primarily in the districts of Arsuz, Defne and Samandağ, where Alawites constitute the majority and in Iskenderun and Antakya where they constitute a significant minority of the population. Larger Alawite communities can also be found in the Çukurova region, mostly in and around the cities of Adana, Tarsus and Mersin. They are known as Arab Alevis by Turkish people.

=== Sufism ===
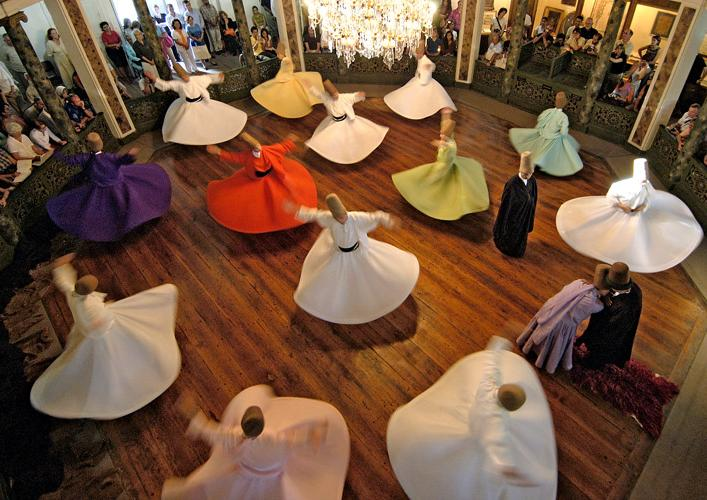
Turkish Sufi whirling dervishes.

Folk Islam in Turkey has derived many of its popular practices from Sufism which has good presence in Turkey and Egypt. Particular Sufi shaikhs – and occasionally other individuals reputed to be pious – were regarded after death as saints having special powers. Veneration of saints (both male and female) and pilgrimages to their shrines and graves represent an important aspect of popular Islam in the country. Folk Islam has continued to embrace such practices although the veneration of saints officially has been discouraged since the 1930s. Plaques posted in various sanctuaries forbid the lighting of candles, the offering of votive objects, and related devotional activities in these places. Modern day Sufi shaykhs with large adherents in Turkey include Shaykh Mehmet Efendi (residing in Istanbul) and Mawlana Sheikh Nazim Al-Haqqani who resided in Lefka, North Cyprus, until his death in May, 2014.

=== Quranism ===
Those who do not accept the authority of hadith, known as Quranists, Quraniyoon, or Ahl al-Quran, are also present in Turkey. In Turkey, Quranist ideas became particularly noticeable, with portions of the youth either leaving Islam or converting to Quranism. There has been significant Quranist scholarship in Turkey, with there being even Quranist theology professors in significant universities, including scholars like Yaşar Nuri Öztürk and Caner Taslaman.

The Turkish Directorate of Religious Affairs (Diyanet) regularly criticizes and insults Quranists, gives them no recognition and calls them kafirs (disbelievers).

== See also ==
- Christianity in Turkey
- Religion in Turkey
- Secularism in Turkey
- Minorities in Turkey
- Freedom of religion in Turkey
- Turkish Islamic synthesis
- Islamokemalism
- Islam by country
- Turkish adhan
