= Ghuraba =

Ghuraba may refer to:

- Ghuraba (Islam), an Islamic eschatological epithet
- Ghuraba, Safad, a former village in Palestine

== See also ==
- Ghurabah, a place in Yemen
