= Şaban Karataş =

Turkish academic and politician (1928–2016)

General Director of Turkish Radio and Television Corporation
- In office 1976 – 20 June 1977
- President: Fahri Korutürk
- Preceded by: Nevzat Yalçıntaş
- Succeeded by: Cengiz Taşer

Personal details
- Born: 1928 Ereğli, Konya, Turkey
- Died: 14 February 2016 (aged 87–88) Ankara, Turkey
- Resting place: Gölbaşı cemetery, Ankara, Turkey
- Party: Justice Party; Welfare Party; Nationalist Movement Party
- Children: 2
- Education: Ankara University; Cornell University
- Occupation: Academic

Şaban Karataş (1928–2016) was a Turkish academic and conservative politician who was the director general of the Turkish Radio and Television Corporation (TRT) in 1976–1977. He served at the Parliament in the late 1970s and 1990s. He joined different right-wing political parties, including the Justice Party, the Welfare Party and the Nationalist Movement Party.

== Early life and education ==
Karataş was born in a village of Ereğli, Konya, in 1928. He graduated from the Faculty of Agriculture at Ankara University in 1953, receiving a degree in agricultural engineering. He obtained a Ph.D. in zootechnics from the same university in 1958. He also received a Ph.D. in statistics and pursued his post-doctorate studies in biometry and animal breeding at Cornell University, USA, between 1958 and 1961.

== Career and activities ==
Karataş joined his alma mater as a research assistant on 30 June 1955. Then he began to teach at Atatürk University and was promoted to associated professor of biostatistics on 29 November 1962. He served as the chair of the Zootechnics Department at Ankara University between 18 March 1965 and 30 June 1966 and became a full professor on 30 June 1966. Then he worked as the dean of the Faculty of Science and Literature and the Faculty of Agriculture at Atatürk University.

Karataş was appointed director general of the TRT in January 1976 replacing Nevzat Yalçıntaş in the post. Karataş's tenure ended on 22 June 1977 when the Council of State annulled his appointment as a result of Bülent Ecevit's complaint against him and the TRT. His successor in the post was Cengiz Taşer.

Karataş was elected as a member of the Parliament in the 1979 by-election for the Justice Party representing Konya. His tenure was cut short due to the military coup on 12 September 1980. Following the coup, Karataş was among the Justice Party members whose political activities were banned by the military regime.

After his ban was lifted in 1987 Karataş served as the head of the Ankara branch of the Intellectuals' Hearth. He became a member of the Parliament in the 1995 general election for the Welfare Party from Ankara. He joined the Nationalist Movement Party when the Welfare Party was banned in January 1998. Karataş's tenure at the Parliament ended in 1999 when he did not win his seat from Konya in the general election.

Karataş was also a member of the Middle East Technical University's board of trustees. He was the founding chair of the Bezmialem Vakıf University's board of trustees.

=== Work and views ===
Karataş published a book entitled İstatistiğe Giriş (Turkish: Introduction to Statistics) in 1963. He also published a book on his term at the TRT entitled TRT Kavgası (Turkish: TRT Fight).

Karataş was respectful for the will of the nation and extremely loyal to the Republic of Turkey, but he was not a Kemalist.

== Personal life and death ==
Karataş was married and had two children. He died in Ankara on 14 February 2016 and was buried in the Gölbaşı cemetery on 16 February.
