= İbrahim Kafesoğlu =

Turkish academic and historian (1914–1984)

- Born: January 1914; Tefenni, Ottoman Empire
- Died: 18 August 1984 (aged 70); Istanbul, Turkey
- Resting place: Edirnekapı Martyr's Cemetery, Istanbul
- Education: Ankara University; Istanbul University
- Spouse: Müzeyyen Kafesoğlu (m. 1946)
- Children: 3
- Scientific career
- Fields: History
- Workplaces: Istanbul University; Atatürk University
- Thesis: Büyük Selçuklu Sultanı Melikşah (Turkish: Malik Shah, Sultan of the Seljuk Empire) (1949)
- Doctoral advisor: Mükrimin Halil Yinanç

İbrahim Kafesoğlu (1914–1984) was a Turkish historian and academic who is known for his role in the development of the Turkish–Islamic synthesis. He was a faculty member of Istanbul University and Atatürk University. He cofounded the conservative think thank Intellectuals' Hearth and was its president from 1970 and 1974.

== Early life and education ==
He was born in Tefenni, Burdur, in January 1914. His father was killed in the East front in World War I.

He graduated from the Teachers' College, Izmir, in 1932. He started his master's degree at Ankara University in 1936 completing his studies in Hungarology, medieval history and Turkish Language at the Faculty of Language, History and Geography. He was sent to Budapest for his Ph.D. studies, but he could not complete the program due to World War II. He managed to return Turkey in April 1945. After working at Ankara University for a brief period he continued his studies at Istanbul University where he obtained his Ph.D. in 1949. His thesis was entitled Büyük Selçuklu Sultanı Melikşah (Turkish: Malik Shah, Sultan of the Seljuk Empire), and his advisor was Mükrimin Halil Yinanç.

His notable teachers at Ankara University and Istanbul University included Fuat Köprülü, Zeki Velidi Togan, Sadri Maksudi Arsal and Reşit Rahmeti Arat.

== Career and activities ==
Kafesoğlu was promoted to associate professor in 1953. He was the chair of the History Department at Istanbul University between 1954 and 1955. Then he joined Atatürk University where he worked until 1962. He became a full professor of history in 1962 at Istanbul University and served as the chair of the Department of General Turkish History from 1970 to January 1983 when he retired from his teaching post. Kafesoğlu succeeded Zeki Velidi Togan as the chair of the department.

Kafesoğlu served as the undersecretary of culture in the Prime Ministry and was a member of the advisory board at the Ministry of Culture. He was made a member of the Turkish Historical Society in 1983.

Kafesoğlu was the founding president of the IH and held the post from May 1970 to 30 January 1974. He was succeeded by Süleyman Yalçın in the post.

=== Work and views ===
Kafesoğlu published various books on history of the Seljuk Empire and Pre-Islamic Turkish history and culture. He also published a book on the Turkish–Islamic synthesis in 1985. He contributed a nationalist conservative magazine entitled Turkish Culture (Turkish: Türk Kültürü) and shaped its ideology.

Kafesoğlu was the major ideologue of the IH and had a significant role in the formulation of the Turkish–Islamic synthesis. For him Islam is a matter of conscience and does not a political or legal system. He stated that a state ruled in accordance with the Islamic principles is not consistent with Turkish traditions. To support his position Kafesoğlu added "Turks never founded an Islamic State because Turks kept their pre-Islamic Turkish understanding of sovereignty, social rights, and toleration in religious life, land regime and the military character for their states." For Kafesoğlu "Turkish nationalism is not racism, but it is not about a religious cause either."

Kafesoğlu argued that the necessity condition for the scientific advancement and the welfare of people in Turkey was the enrichment of national culture. He opposed humanism regarding it as a threat on the grounds that it was not compatible with national culture and that it was a Western idea.

Kafesoğlu described Turkish youth as "the bearer of a 4000-year-old history" and "the representative of a long and glorious struggle." He also developed a definition of intellectuals stating "Obviously, we do not regard those who turn their backs to liberty and scorn national mores as intellectuals."

== Personal life and death ==
Kafesoğlu married Müzeyyen Hanım in 1946 and had three children from this marriage. He was fluent in Hungarian, English, French, German, Persian and Arabic.

Kafesoğlu died in Istanbul on 18 August 1984 and was buried in Edirnekapı Martyr's Cemetery.
