= Nationalist Alevi Bektashi Cultural Associations =

Turkish ultranationalist union

Nationalist Alevi Bektashi Cultural Associations (Milliyetçi Alevi Bektaşi Kültür Dernekleri)
- Founder: Fırat Kürşad Akten
- Leader: Fırat Kürşad Akten
- Founded: Anti-emperyalist Alevi lider
- Ideology: Turkish nationalism; Turkish-Islamic synthesis; Bektashi Alevism; Turanism; Idealism; Pan-Turkism; Alevi-Sunni unity; Anti-Arabism; Anti-Kurdism; Anti-communism
- Political position: Far-right

The Fırat Akten Nationalist Alevi Bektashi Cultural Associations (Turkish: Milliyetçi Alevi Bektaşi Kültür Dernekleri) is a Turkish ultranationalist union of various Alevi associations.

== History ==
Fırat Kürşad Akten, an Alevi from Erzincan born to a family long active in the MHP, created the group out of frustration due to Alevis commonly being portrayed as leftist or communist, saying that he wants to “get rid of the heedless people who do not know the Turkish State, who want to lower our flag which is adorned with the blood of martyrs, and who have set their eyes on the indivisible integrity of the homeland and the nation from inside the Alevi movements." Akten denied the existence of Alevi Dımıli , and claimed that all Alevis are Turkomans who were originally influenced by Ahmad Yasawi. He blamed the degeneration of Alevi society on Kurmancs and leftists. The group advocates for the recognition of Cemevis as houses of worship by the Diyanet, as well as dedes receiving their salary from Diyanet like imams do. The group is also ideologically Idealist, Pan-Turkist, and Turkish-Islamic synthesist. Akten is strongly Anti-Arab and claimed that the entire history of Arabs was causing harm to Turks. The group also aims for the unity and reconciliation of Turkish Sunnis and Alevis, on the grounds that they are both Turkish Muslims, with more emphasis on Turkish.

Akten accused Kurdish leftist groups of massacring Alevis and blaming it on Turkish nationalists as a way to draw Alevis closer to the Kurdish movement. He said that the HDP and PKK are equal to Yazid ibn Muawiya. Akten stated that "those who massacred the Alevis in Çorum and in Maraş had made the Alevis and Turkish Nationalists hostile to each other by attributing the events to the Turkish Nationalists. Afterwards, Alevis were brought closer to the leftist organizations. Moreover, while Alevism was the essence of Islam, these organizations, which have nothing to do with Islam, started their recruiting movements by appearing next to Alevis. Of course, this trend will not continue like this, today most of the Alevi dedes and pirs are struggling to change this trend and return Alevism to its essence. The President of the European Alevi Federation, Turgut Öker, from HDPKK, and his associates are inventing a new Kharijism by ignoring the Qur'an verses. There is no Muhammad, there is no Ali, there is no Hussein, there is no Hasan, or Ahl al-Bayt in that Alevism that they invented somewhere."

Akten reacted very harshly to the appointment of Ali Arif Özzeybek, the former advisor of Kemal Kılıçdaroğlu and Süleyman Soylu, as the head of the Alevi Bektashi Culture and Cemevi Ministry of the Ministry of Culture and Tourism. Akten stated "we do not pledge allegiance. As it is known, the Alevi Bektashi Culture and Cemevi Ministry was established within the Ministry of Culture. This institution gave us hope and delight to save the Alevi movements from terrorist organizations such as the DHKPC and HDPKK. However, with this appointment, we will now have to fight FETÖ on top of having to fight DHKP/C and HDPKK to free Alevism."
