= Ali Fuat Başgil =

Turkish academic and politician (1893–1967)

- Born: 1893; Çarşamba, Samsun, Ottoman Empire
- Died: 17 April 1967 (aged 73–74); Istanbul, Turkey
- Resting place: Karacaahmet Cemetery, Istanbul
- Education: Grenoble University; University of Paris; The Hague Academy of International Law
- Scientific career
- Fields: Law
- Workplaces: Istanbul University; Ankara University

Ali Fuat Başgil (1893–1967) was a Turkish politician and a faculty member of Istanbul University and Ankara University. He is one of the influential figures of the conservative political waves in Turkey. Following his dismissal from the university shortly after the military coup of 27 May 1960 he was elected as a senator. Then he became a candidate for the presidency of Turkey, but his nomination was rejected by the National Unity Committee. He joined the Justice Party and was elected as a member of the Parliament in the 1965 election.

== Early life and education ==
He was born in Çarşamba, Samsun, in 1893. After completing his primary school education in his hometown he went to Istanbul for secondary education. However, he could not graduate from high school since joined the Ottoman Army in 1914 and he fought on the Caucasian front for four years as a reserve officer.

After the war he completed his secondary education at Buffone School in Paris, France. He obtained a degree in law from Grenoble University and then, received his master's degree with a thesis entitled Straits Issue from the University of Paris. He was also educated at the Paris School of Political Sciences and the Faculty of Letters. In addition, he graduated from The Hague Academy of International Law in 1929.

== Career and activities ==
Following his graduation he returned Turkey and joined the Ministry of Education. Next year he became an associate professor of law at Ankara University. He was promoted to the professorship of Roman law in 1931. He began to work at Istanbul University in 1933 when it was reorganized. In addition to the writing of the constitution of Hatay, he served as the legal advisor to the Turkish delegation in the League of Nations Commission in Geneva in regard to the independence of Hatay in 1937.

Başgil served as dean of the Faculty of Law, Istanbul University, between 1938 and 1942. He became an emeritus professor in 1939. For a short time, he taught fundamental organizational law at the Faculty of Law and the Faculty of Political Science, Ankara University. He was the dean of the Faculty of Political Science from 1942 to 1943. In 1943, he returned to his chair at Istanbul University's Faculty of Law. He cofounded the Society for the Dissemination of Free Ideas in 1947.

After the military coup of 27 May 1960 which ended the rule of the Democrat Party (DP), the National Unity Committee removed Başgil along with 147 faculty members from his academic post. Although they were later allowed by a special law to resume their academic posts, Başgil did not return to his teaching post retiring from the university on 10 April 1961. After his retirement Başgil became part of the Thinkers Club (Turkish: Aydınlar Kulübü) of which ideology was a synthesis of Turkism and Islamism. The other major members of the group included Arif Nihat Asya, Kemal Ilıcak, Tarık Buğra and Süleyman Yalçın.

Başgil was involved in the establishment of the Justice Party. He was elected senator as an independent candidate from the Justice Party list representing Samsun in 1961. Although he ran for the presidency during this period, his nomination was rejected by the National Unity Committee. The committee also asked his resignation from the Senate, and Başgil complied with this demand resigning from the senatorship. He went to Switzerland in 1962 where he worked at the Department of Turkish History and Language of the University of Geneva. Upon his return he joined the Justice Party and was elected as a member of parliament in the 1965 election.

=== Work and views ===
Başgil published various books and articles written in Turkish and in other languages. He also contributed to various newspapers such as Zafer and magazines such as Serdengeçti and Hareket. His articles were mostly about secularism and freedom of religion.

Başgil was a liberal conservative believing in democratic parliamentarian rights. However, he opposed the concept of equality. His views have been employed by all center-right socio-political movements in Turkey. For instance, he was one of the major ideologues of the DP. Yalçın Akdoğan who developed the political identity of the Justice and Development Party as conservative democrat also used Başgil's concept of freedom of religion.

Başgil was the first Turkish scholar who discussed secularism openly and critically, but he did not reject it. He regarded secularism as the state's respect for the freedom of religion. For him secularism in Turkey did not function as the guarantor of the freedom of religion and conscience. Başgil's critics, on the other hand, argued that his formulation of secularism was based on Islam and also, a major deviation from the Turkish laicism. Başgil was also subject to the harsh criticisms by Nihal Atsız, a significant nationalist figure, due to his Anatolianist views.

Başgil considered religion or Islam to be both helpful and essential for individuals and society. He added that the state could not totally repress religious beliefs which may result in negative outcomes. In his later life he supported the Turkish–Islamic synthesis to bring together the conservative figures, including the Islamists and Turkists.

== Death ==
Başgil died in Istanbul on 17 April 1967 and was buried in Karacaahmet Cemetery, Istanbul.
