= Ahmet Arvasi =

Turkish writer and philosopher

- Born: February 15, 1932; Doğubeyazıt, Ağrı, Turkey
- Died: December 31, 1988 (aged 56); Kadıköy, Istanbul, Turkey
- Occupations: Writer, philosopher

Ahmet Arvasi (February 15, 1932 – December 31, 1988), commonly known as Seyyid Ahmet Arvasi, was a Turkish writer and philosopher of Kurdish origin. He is known for expounding upon the ideology of the "Turkish-Islamic Synthesis Doctrine" and its effect on Turkey. He was born in Doğubeyazıt district of Ağrı, Turkey. His family is from Van Province. His father Seyyid Abdulhakim Arvasi (1865–1943) was a Sunni Islamic scholar during the late Ottoman and early Republic periods of Turkey.

== His life ==
Ahmet Arvasi was born on February 15, 1932. He graduated from the Erzurum Teachers' College and worked as an elementary school teacher for a while. In 1958 he graduated from the Department of Pedagogy of the Gazi Education Institution. He worked as a lecturer at the education institutions in Balıkesir, Bursa, and Istanbul respectively then retired in 1979. In the same year he was elected as a member of the General Administration Board of the Nationalist Movement Party (Turkish: Milliyetçi Hareket Partisi, MHP) and served his term until the 1980 Turkish coup d'état. After the coup d'état he was detained and tried for conspiring against the Nationalist Movement Party.

Ahmet Arvasi has published several daily columns, articles, and books. He also delivered many speeches at several conferences and seminars. Before his death, he was a columnist of Türkiye daily. He died on 31 December 1988 in front of his typewriter while he was drafting his daily column for Türkiye daily.

== His books ==
- Türk-İslam Ülküsü (Turkish-Islamic Idealism) (3 volumes)
- Kendini Arayan İnsan (Human Looking For Himself)
- İnsan ve İnsan Ötesi (Human and Beyond the Human Being)
- Diyalektiğimiz ve Estetiğimiz (Our Dialectic and Our Aesthetics)
- Şiirlerim (My Poems)
- Eğitim Sosyolojisi (Education Sociology)
- Doğu Anadolu Gerçeği (Southeast Reality)
- İleri Türk Milliyetçiliğinin İlkeleri (Principles of Advanced Turkish Nationalism)
- Hasbihal (Causeries) (6 volumes)
- İnsanın Yalnızlığı (Loneliness of the Human Being)
