= Green Crescent =

Charitable organization

Turkish Green Crescent Türk Yeşilayı
- Company type: Charitable organization
- Founded: 1920 (as Hilâl-i Ahdar Cemiyeti)
- Headquarters: Istanbul, Turkey
- Website: http://www.yesilay.org.tr

Green Crescent (Turkish: Yeşilay) is a non-profit organisation that fights smoking, alcohol, and other addictions such as drug use, and provides services and protection methods to all citizens, especially the young, affected by harmful habits. It was established on 5 March 1920 in Istanbul. One of its chairs was Ayhan Songar.

== Memberships of international organisations ==
As of 2015, the Green Crescent is a member of the following:

- Board of Directors of Europe Against Drugs (EURAD),
- Board of Directors of European Alcohol Policy Alliance (EUROCARE),
- International Society for the Study of Drug Policy (ISSDP),
- has special consultative status with the United Nations Economic Social Council (ECOSOC),
- Vienna NGO Committee, the civilian network of the UN Office On Drugs and Crime (UNODC),
- International Drug Policy Consortium (IDPC),
- Avicenna Health Association formed within the body of the Organization of Islamic Cooperation (OIC) in order to conduct activities in the field of health policies,
- president of the Addiction Working Group, consisting of doctors from many countries, within the body of the Federation of Islamic Medical Associations (FIMA),
- International Silk Road Medical Research Center based in the People’s Republic of China.

== Global reach ==
An initiative is underway to gather national Green Crescents of various countries under one roof as the World Green Crescents Federation based in Istanbul.
