= Tarık Buğra =

Turkish journalist, novelist and short story author (1918-1994)

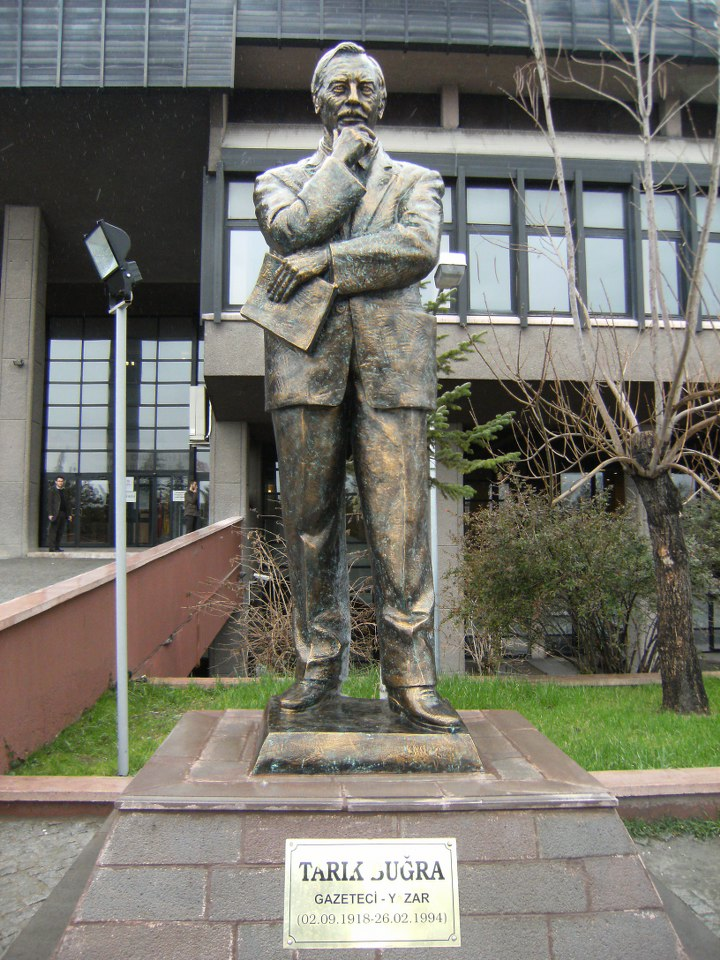
Statue of Tarık Buğra in front of the National Library of Turkey

Süleyman Tarık Buğra (2 September 1918 – 26 February 1994) was a Turkish journalist, novelist and short story author. He was well-known author at Republican literature in his country. He was honoured as a State Artist in 1991. Buğra is the father of scientist Ayşe Buğra.

== Biography ==
Buğra was born on 2 September 1918 in Akşehir, Konya, son of criminal judge Mehmet Nazım from Erzurum and Nazike from Akşehir. His hometown was effective on Buğra's literatural identity. He preferred to signify this town in most of his works. Buğra graduated from primary school and secondary school in the same town.

In the 1960s Buğra was part of the Thinkers Club (Turkish: Aydınlar Kulübü) of which ideology was a synthesis of Turkism and Islamism. The other major members of the group included Arif Nihat Asya, Kemal Ilıcak, Ali Fuat Başgil and Süleyman Yalçın.

== Bibliography ==
=== Stories ===
- Oğlumuz (1949)
- Yarın Diye Bir Şey Yoktur (1952)
- İki Uyku Arasında (1954)
- Hikâyeler (1964, yeni ilavelerle 1969)

=== Theatre plays ===
- Ayakta Durmak İstiyorum
- Akümülatörlü Radyo
- Yüzlerce Çiçek Birden Açtı (1979)

=== Travel memoirs ===
- Gagaringrad (Moskova Notları) (1962)

=== Essays ===
- Gençlik Türküsü (1964)
- Düşman Kazanmak Sanatı (1979)
- Politika Dışı (1992).
- Bu Çağın Adı (1990)

=== Novels ===
- Siyah Kehribar (1955)
- Küçük Ağa (1954)
- Küçük Ağa Ankarada (1966)
- İbiş'in Rüyası (1970)
- Firavun İmanı (1976)
- Gençliğim Eyvah (1979)
- Dönemeçte (1980)
- Yalnızlar (1981)
- Yağmur Beklerken (1981)
- Osmancık (1973)
- Dünyanın En Pis Sokağı (1989)

=== Scripts ===
- Sıfırdan Doruğa-Patron (1994)
