= Ghuraba (Islam) =

Islamic eschatological epithet

Ghuraba or Al-Ghurabaa (Arabic: الغرباء al-Ghurabā) is an Islamic eschatological epithet mentioned in the hadith that vicariously describes the manner in which upright Muslims are perceived by the wider society towards the end of times. The term Ghuraba literally means strange or weird.

== Overview ==
The most authentic hadith collection that discusses the Ghuraba in detail is Sahih Muslim. In it, the term Ghuraba is used as both a countable noun, to refer to the people, and as a non-countable noun, to refer to the concept:

Narrated Abdullaah ibn Mas’ood:

“Indeed, Islam began as something strange, and it will return to being strange just as it began, so glad tidings of paradise be for the strangers.”

In Another Hadith:

Abu Huraira reported: The Messenger of Allah, peace and blessings be upon him, said, “Islam began as something strange and it will return to being strange, so blessed are the strangers.”

Source: Sahih Muslim 145

Sahih Bukhari also alludes being a stranger as the correct conduct and etiquette in the narration "Live in this world as though you are a stranger or a traveler". Saudi cleric al-Ouda described Ghuraba as meaning solitary people or loners due to their faith in Islam and actions that reflect. An Arabic journal described the term Ghuraba as meaning foreigner.

== Demographics ==
There are other hadiths wherein the term Ghuraba alludes to its sobriquets being a minority within wider society. In a response to the question of who the Ghuraba are, prophet Muhammad answers as follows:

Narrated Amr Ibn al-Aas:

“They are righteous people amongst many people who are evil, and those who obey them are few as compared to those who disobey them.”

Other hadiths similarly describes them as those who try to correct the masses, but they are seen as backward or "strange" by their societies for they do act as the masses do, such as adultery, interest, or disbelief due to their belief in Islam.

== Scripture ==
The Quran similarly ordains that the most pious stance is signified by an archetype which is eccentric, peculiar, isolated and nonconformist rather than one which is conventional, customary, prevailing or orthodox:

وَإِن تُطِعْ أَكْثَرَ مَن فِي الْأَرْضِ يُضِلُّوكَ عَن سَبِيلِ اللَّهِ إِن يَتَّبِعُونَ إِلَّا الظَّنَّ وَإِنْ هُمْ إِلَّا يَخْرُصُونَ

wa-in tuṭʿi akthara man fīl arḍi yuḍillūka ʿan sabīli l-lahi in yattabiʿūna illā l-ẓanna wa-in hum illā yakhruṣūn ^{n}

“And if you obey most of those in the earth, they will lead you astray from Allah's way; they follow but conjecture and they only lie..”

== Subsets ==
Contemporary and medieval explications on the Ghuraba hadiths have given various archetypes on the whom constitutes a member of the Ghuraba. One analyst has described Muslim converts or reverts as being Ghuraba if they are amongst people who were born into Muslim families. Ibn al-Qayyim referred to Ghuraba as eccentric, isolated and nonconformist individuals, claiming that they are considered strange or weird even among fellow non-devout Muslims who do not uphold Islam.

His archetype of the Ghuraba followed a pedigree chart whereby the most untenable Ghuraba were Muslims among non-Muslims, followed by steadfast Muslims among ordinary Muslims, and then Islamic scholars among steadfast Muslims.

== Historical Usage ==
In 1504, following the forced conversion of Iberia's last Muslims of Granada by the Crown of Castile, the Oran fatwa was authorized by mufti Ahmad ibn Abi Jum'ah.

The fatwa, intended to grant certain leniencies to the persecuted Muslim community (such as, for example, permission to openly leave Islam so long as they remained Muslim in their hearts) addressed its recipient, the Muslim community in Granada, as al-ghuraba.
