= Turkish adhan =

Period of time when the adhan was read in Turkish

The Turkish adhan (Turkish: Türkçe ezan) was the use of the Turkish language to officially recite the Adhan for a period of time in Turkey. The usage of Arabic was banned by the Diyanet on order of Mustafa Kemal Atatürk in 1932 and was unbanned 18 years later on June 16, 1950.

== History ==
With the rise of Turkish nationalism in the 19th century and the modern Turkish language being given more attention, Ali Suavi argued that the Adhan, and even the Khutbahs and Quran should be in Turkish.

After the Turkish War of Independence and the establishment of the Republic of Turkey, the Turkish language became the only official language of Turkey and became more strictly implemented in the whole country as part of Atatürk's reforms. The Diyanet was established on order of Mustafa Kemal Atatürk to handle religious affairs in Turkey. With the encouragement of Atatürk, nine huffaz began working on Turkifying Islam to make it more compatible with Turkish nationalism, and translating everything into Turkish. The Turkish translation of the Quran was first recited by Yaşar Okur on January 22, 1932. Eight days later on January 30, 1932, the first Turkish adhan was recited by Hafiz Rifat Bey in Fatih Mosque, Istanbul; after that it became official and everything was mandated to be in Turkish. On November 21, 1932, all mosques across Turkey were instructed to start using the Turkish adhan. For this purpose, a gramophone recording was made by Hafiz Sadettin of the Sultan Ahmet Mosque to serve as a model for others.

After the adhan and Quran became officially in Turkish, the President of Diyanet, Rıfat Börekçi, decided that the entire Salah should be in Turkish too. The Turkish salah was made official on March 6, 1933. In 1941, the Diyanet officially made the use of Arabic in mosques as a punishable crime. In 1941 they enacted a new law numbered 4055, in which a paragraph was added to Article 526 of the Turkish Penal Code. According to the change, those who read the salah, Quran, and adhan in the Arabic language would be imprisoned for up to three months and have to pay a fine from 10 liras to 200 liras.

=== Decriminalisation ===
After the 1950 Turkish general election, the Democratic Party of Celâl Bayar won the election. After they won they made a proposal to unban the Arabic language for religious purposes. Cemal Reşit Eyüboğlu, the CHP deputy of Trabzon, who spoke on behalf of the CHP in the meetings in the TBMM, said that they were against the use of the Arabic language and that it wasn’t even worth opening a discussion about. Later, both CHP and DP members voted in the proposal. On the same day, the result of the votes was sent to Bayar, in which he accepted to unban Arabic for religious purposes.

With the law enacted, the use of Turkish for religious purposes was still legal, yet Arabic became more popular. Although the Turkish adhan is still legal by law, the adhan has not been read in Turkish after 1950. In 1954, in Cyprus, the Turkish Cypriot Mufti Dânâ Efendi gave a fatwa saying that it is permissible to read the Adhan in Turkish because the people want it to be read in Turkish rather than Arabic.

=== Reactions to decriminalisation ===
After the 1960 Turkish coup d'état, Celal Bayar, who lifted the ban on Arabic, was overthrown and Adnan Menderes was executed. The coup was led by Turkish nationalists, who harshly criticised the use of the Arabic language. Alparslan Türkeş, founder of the MHP and Grey Wolves and leading figure in the Turkish-Islamic nationalism movement, was one of the leaders of the coup. In a post-coup interview, Türkeş described the usage of Arabic for religion as a "betrayal", and said "In a Turkish mosque, the Quran should be read in Turkish, not Arabic."
