= Turkish–Islamic synthesis =

Ideology involving Turkish nationalism and Islamism

Turkish–Islamic synthesis (Turkish: Türk-İslam sentezi) is an Islamic-conservative form of Turkish nationalism that treats Islamic traditions rather than secularism, as a core component of Turkish cultural identity.

== History ==
While the Turkish–Islamic synthesis was officially formed during the Cold War as part of Operation Gladio, its roots, in reality predated the foundation of Turkey in 1923. While the Young Turks were forming their ideology, a group of Balkan Turks in 1898 declared that nationalism and Islam needed to be merged, and within 10 years, the Young Turks had begun to promote the ideology. The ideology thrived among Balkan Turks as they were inspired by how the nationalist movements in the Balkans (Bulgarian, Greek, Serbian) were connected to their national churches. The nationalist laik ideology of Kemalism was cautiously mixed with Islam, and the 1930s concept of laiklik was reinterpreted and given a new form as the "Turkish-Islamic synthesis".

Ziya Gökalp had proposed that Islam be nationalized, with the prayers and sermons being in Turkish. Much of Atatürk's reforms regarding Islam were inspired by Gökalp. Furthermore, the Turkish constitution banned the expression of Islam unless it benefitted the state. Hamit Bozarslan claimed that while the Republic of Turkey was officially secular, its policies mirrored the Turkish–Islamic synthesis in practice.

The Turkish–Islamic synthesis was formed as part of Operation Gladio during the Cold War by American-backed right-wing intellectuals such as Alparslan Türkeş who were concerned about the increasing Soviet-backed leftist influence in the country. They wanted to make a religion-inspired nationalism. Türkeş did not support Pan-Islamism. Ahmet Ocak used the term "Turkish Islam" and insisted that the Turkish understanding of Islam was different from the others, rejecting the universality of Islam. The Turkish government and military tolerated and even promoted the ideology during the 1976-1980 political violence. When the Turkish–Islamic synthesis was presented in the 1970s, it was seen as the fulfillment of Atatürk's desire to nationalize Islam in line with the Kemalist state. In the 1980s, the Turkish–Islamic synthesis was officially promoted in school textbooks. The ideology was also developed by the Intellectuals' Hearth.

While nationalists and Islamists were natural rivals in other Muslim nations, in Turkey, most Turkish Islamists professed a degree of ethnonationalism. The synthesis was based on the Hanafi school, and claimed that it was essential to Turkishness. The synthesis also claimed that in the ummah, the Turks were spiritually, morally, and culturally superior. According to the synthesis, Turkish identity and Islam are both essential to each other. Followers of the ideology claimed that even before adopting Islam, Turks were receptive to Islam. The synthesis emphasised on Islam domestically among Turks, and not on Islam among Muslims worldwide. The synthesis also advocated for Islam in society which would culturally be more Turkish and less Arabic. Ziya Gökalp claimed that one had to be Muslim to be a Turk. He also claimed that any Muslim who speaks Turkish is a Turk, regardless of ethnic origin. He claimed that all Turks were equally Turks, whether or not they were ethnically Turkic.

In the late 1970s, the Turkish political scene was full of ideological conflicts between far-right ultranationalists (Idealists) and far-left groups, along with little-to-no governmental effort to stop it. Under the Motherland Party rule, Turkish Islamonationalism became the de facto official ideology of Turkey (and until today it is accused of being so under AKP rule, although the AKP strongly denies it). In 1982, religion was strengthened in schools and education as a way to strengthen Turkish Islamonationalism, which intended to weaken mainstream Islamism and secular nationalism. According to Adnan Türegün, Erdoğan promoted "Turco-Islamism" which differed from the Turkish-Islamic synthesis in that it was a state policy.

Historically, Islamist movements in Turkey had an ethnic divide. Most Islamist or conservative groups solely recruited from either Kurds or Turks, with very few groups recruiting from both. The primary cause for the divide was that most Turkish Islamists held strong nationalist views, refused to fight against their own government, and often held Anti-Kurdish views as well. In turn, the Kurdish Islamists also held nationalist, separatist, and Anti-Turkish views, and often cooperated with secular Kurdish nationalists. Islamist militancy in Turkey was dominated by Kurds. Most Turkish Islamists preferred to travel for Jihad abroad. In the Bosnian War, Syrian civil war, as well as the First and Second Chechen War, they mostly professed Turkish nationalist, Neo-Ottomanist, and Pan-Turkist motives in addition to Islamism.

== Views on non-Turks ==
=== Arabs ===
İbrahim Kafesoğlu claimed that Pre-Islamic Turks had innately been better Muslims than Arabs. Alparslan Türkeş, founder of the MHP and Grey Wolves and one of the top ideologues of the Turkish–Islamic synthesis, was an advocate of the Turkish adhan and advocated for the Quran, Adhan, and even Salahs to be solely in the Turkish language in Turkey. He co-led the 1960 Turkish coup d'état and in an interview after the coup, Türkeş described the usage of Arabic for religion as a "betrayal", and said "In a Turkish mosque, the Quran should be read in Turkish, not Arabic." Turkish-Islamic nationalists portrayed Turks as the leaders of Islam, in contrast to Arabs, who were seen as either having distorted the faith or failed to modernize. Many Turkish-Islamic nationalists had long viewed Arab customs and the Arabic language as "unrefined" or "foreign", even as they upheld Islamic values. Necip Fazıl Kısakürek, a major intellectual inspiration for Turkish political Islam, viewed Arabs as politically inept and culturally alien. His works often romanticized Turkish rule over Arabs and lamented the loss of Ottoman-era hierarchy. Many Turkish-Islamic nationalists also cited the Arab Revolt to justify their claims that Arabs abandoned Islam whereas Turks remained loyal to it. After the refugee crisis, anti-Arabism increased, mostly among Grey Wolves. In Gaziantep, approximately 2 dozen Syrian Arabs had to leave the city after angry Turkish crowds belonging to the Grey Wolves ransacked their homes. Another time a group of about 1,000 Grey Wolves, which organized on social media, blocked various roads in Kahramanmaraş and refused to leave even after police warnings. The protestors also removed Arabic signs from many Syrian-owned stores, and many store owners closed their shops in fear. They also attacked a Syrian in a car and broke his windows, however they ran away after the Turkish police fired a warning gunshot into the air. Many Turkish Islamonationalist organizations volunteer to fight in Syria in favor of Syrian Turkmen to strengthen Turkmen interests and weaken Arab rule. The Alperen Hearths sent 250 fighters in 2015 to "fight against Russia, Iran, and Assad. And to help Turkmen", although they were later accused of having just came into Syria to take photos with fighters, as many of the Alperen Hearths were seen in Istanbul just days after they went to supposedly fight.

=== Kurds ===
İbrahim Kafesoğlu claimed that Kurds were not a nation, but a tribe of Turkic-Turanid origin which migrated to the Middle East earlier than other Turks, and was assimilated by the neighboring populations, especially Iranian. In a 2013 interview, Altan Tan claimed that the Islamist movement in Turkey was "full of nationalists" who despised Kurds, therefore prompting Kurds to vote secular. Turkish–Islamic nationalists often attempted to hide the Kurdishness of various Islamic figures.

A Turkish politician once stated that "for a thousand years, Kurds and Turks formed an ummah that fought against the invading kuffar armies. However, even in this unification, Kurds stayed as Kurds, Turks stayed as Turks. This is how religion should be employed; it should not be employed for assimilation purposes, as the Turkish state is so intent on doing." Another Turkish religious activist claimed that "because they were repressed for years under Kemalist regimes, several Muslim Turkish associations and NGOs developed the ritual of having their own Friday prayers in small groups in their own apartments and offices, free from state monitor and control. These were not mass events though. Since Muslim Turks feared the state's rage the prayers were held without any public announcement. Only those who were in the know attended. However, when it comes to Kurds, all of a sudden, Muslim Turks find this ritual disturbing. They label Civil Friday prayers as 'so-called Friday prayers' and they say that these prayers are harmful to Muslim unity. So, what has changed? Why is it that alternative, state-free Friday prayers, which were completely acceptable when Turks had them, are deemed dangerous when Kurds organize them? I think Muslim Turks are angry at Muslim Kurds for having achieved something they have not been able to achieve themselves: challenge the state in a public and visible way." She also claimed that "the state has co-opted Muslim Turks with the implementation of Turkish-Islamic policies. For example, as a Muslim Turk, you are free to campaign for the sufferings of Muslims in other countries, such as Bosnia, Palestine, China, Syria, etc. However, you are not allowed to draw attention to the sufferings of Muslim Kurds." She also stated "I have been actively involved in Kurdish rights activism since the 80s. For years, Muslim Turks, including close friends of mine, have labeled me as a Kurdist/Kurdophile. When I worked with Muslim Turkish NGOs in Istanbul, or in other Western cities, after becoming good friends they would tell me that they have been warned about my Kurdist tendencies. Yet, no one calls you Chechenist, Arabist, Bosniakist when you show an interest in the sufferings of Muslims in Chechnya, Palestine, or Bosnia. The irony is that, most of these people who accuse me of being a Kurdist are actually Turkists, but they do not even acknowledge it."

Turkish Islamonationalists were accused of downplaying Shafi'ism "at every opportunity" and attempting to spread Hanafism to Kurds in hopes that it would also lead them to adopt a Turkish identity. Islamist and conservative groups in Turkey, such as the Refah Party, and the AKP, were accused of carrying nationalist views as well. Despite using an "Islamic formula" to meet Kurdish demands, the Turkish Islamists ultimately failed, as they did not want to offend Turkish nationalism. The AKP appeals to Kurds had failed for many reasons, mainly because Kurdish identity was important for Kurdish Muslims, the Islamic identity that the AKP presented to replace Kemalism still included "the heavy dose of nationalism", and instead of genuinely attempting to resolve the conflict, the AKP occasionally loosened the restrictions on Kurds to counter domestic and foreign pressure. The AKP and its Turkish nationalism was the source of the division of Islamists in Turkey on an ethnic basis. Many Turkish-Islamic nationalists in the 1990s and 2000s began attempting to make Kurds leave Islam, so Islam would further be associated with Turks, and the Kurdish independence movement would be delegitimized in the Islamic world. Many Kurdish nationalists and leftists did leave Islam during that time, viewing it as Turkish spiritual colonization. The complicity of religious institutions in Turkey in the denial of the Kurdish ethnicity led some Kurds to abandon Islam or disavow the faith altogether.

Hakan Yavuz noted a theme across Turkish Islamist movements and stated that "Among the Turkish Islamists, there has been a recurring sense that the Turkish nation, due to Kemalist secularization, has become estranged from Islamic identity, while Kurds are seen as preserving religious devotion more faithfully.” In Jenny White’s analysis of Islam and nationalism in Turkey, she noted that "Islamist circles have sometimes romanticized the religiosity of the Kurds as a foil to secular Turkishness, especially in right-wing and conservative critiques of Republican reforms." Ahmet İnsel, a Turkish intellectual stated that "The Kurds' attachment to religion is often invoked in Islamic nationalist discourse, implicitly contrasting it with the spiritual malaise of urban Turkish society." According to Nilüfer Göle, "The admiration for Kurdish piety among Turkish Islamists at times reveals an underlying unease with their own secularized upbringing."

The 1980 coup implemented Turkish–Islamic synthesis as the de facto state ideology, and also implemented the most restrictive policies against Kurdish identity in the history of Turkey. Amid increased Turkish Islamonationalist hatred towards Kurds, the PKK took up arms in 1984. Turkish Islamonationalist portrayed Kurds as the provocateurs in the conflict. Many Turkish Islamonationalists frequently made the excuse that they only oppose the PKK or separatists and not ordinary Kurds. However, in practice, they opposed Kurds in general, and they continued their Anti-Kurdish policies whilst simultaneously denying them.

Although Recep Tayyip Erdoğan initially achieved the most progress in solving the conflict, he took a sharp nationalist turn in the 2010s and began restricting Kurdish cultural expressions, and most Turkish Islamonationalists supported Erdoğan and became the bulk of the opposition to increased Kurdish cultural rights in Turkey. Mucahit Bilici stated that "there is a clear pattern in Erdoğan's language and indeed in the approach of all Islamist interlocutors with the Kurds. The primary aim is to minimize and make invisible the Kurds' Kurdishness by highlighting their Muslimness. The word 'Kurd' itself is avoided and used only very strategically. It occurs most often as part of a laundry list of ethnicities—Laz, Circassian, Georgian, Arab, Bosnian, Albanian—all specificity swamped by false diversity. The Kurds can gain legitimacy and prominence only as servants and defenders of Islam. Kurdish cities are re-presented as deeply religious domiciles. For example, the city of Urfa is always called 'city of the prophets' and Diyarbakır 'city of the companions'. The purpose is to avoid treating anything Kurdish as purely Kurdish."

On February 23, 1979, while the 20-year-old Kurdish Raider activist, Metin Yüksel, was leaving Istanbul's Fatih Mosque, he was shot dead by Grey Wolves loyal to the MHP.

=== Greeks ===
Turkish Islamonationalists are known to hate Greeks due to their conflicts in history as well as Greeks being Christian. The Grey Wolves were once accused of storming an Istanbul pogrom memorial exhibition and throwing eggs and taking down pictures, although the Grey Wolves denied any involvement. In 2005 many Turkish Islamonationalists organized a rally and marched to the gate of the Ecumenical Patriarchate of Constantinople and chanted "Patriarch Leave" and "Patriarchate to Greece". MHP leader also once held a map showing Turkey claiming all of the islands controlled by Greece.

=== Armenians ===
Similar to Greeks, Turkish Islamonationalists are also known to hate Armenians due to their conflicting history and due to Armenians practicing Christianity. Sevag Balıkçı, an Armenian in the Turkish Army, was murdered by Kıvanç Ağaoglu, who was a supporter of Abdullah Çatlı, the former Grey Wolves leader. On Armenian Genocide Remembrance Day in 2012, various nationalist and Turkish Islamonationalist groups protested against the remembrance of the Armenian genocide in Taksim Square. When Armenian pianist Tigran Hamasyan visited the city of Ani in Kars Province, the local Grey Wolves leader suggested that his anyone who supports him should "go on an Armenian hunt".

== Criticism ==
Turkish Islamonationalism is often criticized by Islamists who view nationalism as a sin, by secular Turkish nationalists who view religion as unimportant, and by various minority rights organizations and activists in Turkey. The Turkish nationalists in early Turkey were known for their secularism, Atatürk had applauded a 1926 document written by Hasan Ruşeni Barkın, titled "there is no religion, just nationality. My Turkishness is my religion."

However scholars such as Benny Morris and Dror Ze'evi amongst many others challenge the claims on Mustafa Kemal in their co-authored book The Thirty Year Genocide.

In the same manner other numerous historians allege his leadership was directly accountable of various religious massacres and deportations.

Ahmet Altan, a Turkish Islamist commentator, stated "would Turkish Muslims who believe in the Turkish-Islamic synthesis and see it in accordance with the religion also accept the Kurdish-Islamic synthesis? Since they accept the Turkish-Islamic synthesis and find it appropriate to add a national name to Islam, they cannot object to the Kurdish-Islamic synthesis." A Kurdish cleric had also called for violence against Turkish–Islamic synthesists, claiming that they are the exact same as Kemalists and Turanists when it comes to Anti-Kurdism.

The Raiders Organization claimed that this ideology is a "fascistic product of imperialism", and that nationalism is a Western ideology, which has no place in Islamic nations.

Nihal Atsız viewed it as an artificial ideology which forcefully fuses two contradictory ideologies together, and he also saw Islamism as being incompatible with Turkism.

The ideology was also criticised by Pan-Turkists who said "the person who does not defend secularism cannot be a Turanist. The Gagauz are Christian, Karaites and Khazar are Jewish, Altais are Tengrist, Yakuts are shamanist, Azerbaijanis are Shia, Anatolian Turkmens are Alevi. The Turkish-Islamic Synthesis and its Sunnism, was not able to reach large utopias, but a small part of Anatolia. Instead of caring for the Turkmen Alevi, it considers it ideal to beat the son of a Turkmen in the name of idealism-sunnism because he is a leftist. In addition, secularism prevents the damage of sectarianism and gives the nation rationality. If he is an idealist, he cannot remain against secularism. The idealist who does not defend secularism does not have ideals nor kızılelma." Kızılelma means "red apple" and symbolizes the goal of conquest in Turkish tradition.

== Famous people ==
- Seyyid Ahmet Arvasi
- Ziya Gökalp
- Alparslan Türkeş
- Muhsin Yazıcıoğlu
- Mustafa Destici
- Devlet Bahçeli
- İbrahim Kafesoğlu
- Remzi Çayır

== Groups ==
=== Sunni Muslim ===
- Committee of Union and Progress
- Nationalist Movement Party
- Great Unity Party
- National Path Party
- Hearth Party
- Key Party
- Grey Wolves (Idealist Hearths)
- Nationalist Task Party
- Alperen Hearths
- Worldly Order Hearths
- Bright Turkey Party
- Ottoman Hearths
- Sultan Murad Division

=== Alevi Muslim ===
- Nationalist Alevi Bektashi Cultural Associations

== See also ==
- Islam in Turkey
- Idealism
- Islamokemalism
- İttihadism
- Religion in Turkey
- Islam and nationalism
- Kurdish-Islamic nationalism
- Arab–Islamic nationalism
- Madkhalism
- Neo-Ottomanism
- Turkish support for Hamas
