= Headscarf controversy in Turkey =

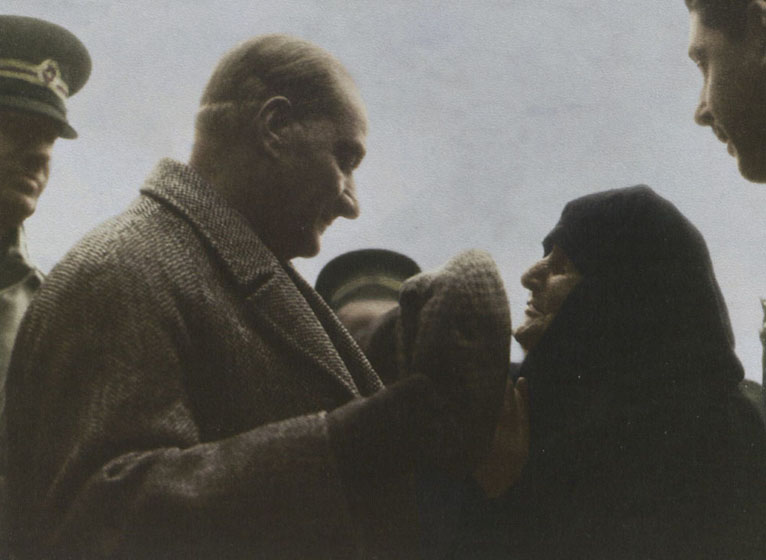
Atatürk and an old woman in çarşaf

In the Ottoman Empire, dress codes were based on religious and ethnic principles and also served as an indicator of professional and social status. However, in the last two centuries of the Empire, with increasing interaction with the Western world, Muslim women began to abandon traditional clothings and wear garments that bore Western influences. These garments left their faces and necks exposed as outer dress. During this period, imperial decrees were issued to prevent this trend. However, the presence of some rulers and sultans, alongside the writers and artists who encouraged this change, accelerated this trend rather than halting it.

Mustafa Kemal Atatürk had the ambition to transform Turkey into a new modern secular state. The modernization reform program of Turkey by him abolished sex segregation and encouraged women to unveil as a part of a social revolution in order to make Turkey a modern state. He appeared in public with his wife Latife Uşaki unveiled, and arranged formal state receptions with dinner and dance where men and women could mingle, to encourage women to leave seclusion and adopt modern clothing, and in the mid-1920s, upper and middle class Turkish women started to appear unveiled in public. In 1925, the Turkish government introduced a new Family Law modelled after the Swiss Family Law, and in the same year, it banned the fez, a cultural implement introduced and encouraged by Mahmud II as a symbol of modernity and Westernization. In 1928, the Turkish government removed the official religion provision from the constitution. Even so, Atatürk never forbade the headscarf (the dominant form of hijab in Turkey, where it is called başörtüsü meaning head cover), but did not encourage its use either. One exception to this might be the 1935 Ministry of Interior circular banning women from wearing clothing that covered their faces. While no law was passed, the ban was enforced through municipalities and law enforcement. However, this ban during the single-party era was not the first; similar practices existed in the Ottoman Empire, such as during the reign of Abdul Hamid II.

Between 92 and 95% of Turkey is Muslim, According to some studies the use of veil is 48 to 54% of women in general, while only 48% of the young women are veiling. However, until the 1980s and 1990s, Turkish women held positions and served in public institutions in compliance with the secular dress codes introduced by Turkish governments. By the 1980s and 1990s, with the rise of Islamist revolutions in neighboring countries like the Islamic Iranian Revolution, the rise of the Islamist wave in Turkey, secular segments of society, primarily the military, who dominated state institutions, declared religious extremism as the primary threat to themselves and the government. Another characteristic of this Islamist wave was the breaking away from traditional female roles that isolated women from society, and the encouragement of women entering the public sphere wearing clothings labeled as Islamic, particularly the headscarf, which they presented as "God's command." The headscarf became a topic of discussion for many Islamic writers, and later for non-Islamist writers who approached the issue from a human rights perspective, becoming a key element in the Islamist-secular conflict.

The headscarf debate in Turkey arose as a reaction to the rise of conservatism and political Islamism, fueled by migration from rural areas to cities, and also after the secular-minded military seized power in the 1980 coup. The coup regime, in an effort to suppress right-left factions that caused divisions and deep conflicts among Turkish youth, introduced strict disciplinary rules in universities, including those concerning dress code and began to be implemented in a radical way after the 1997 military memorandum. Restrictive provisions were lifted by the democratization package in 2013, with the amendment made in article 5 of the dress code regulation, but remained in effect in the military, police force and judiciary. The ban was lifted for Turkish policewomen in 2016 and few months later the headscarf ban was lifted in the Turkish military, the last state institution where it remained, as the military’s opposition to the government’s reforms had been weakened following the failed 2016 coup attempt.

In 2022 both Turkey's Islamist government and the formerly secular opposition vowed to take "legal steps to enshrine women's right to wear Islamic headscarves".

== History ==
=== Background ===
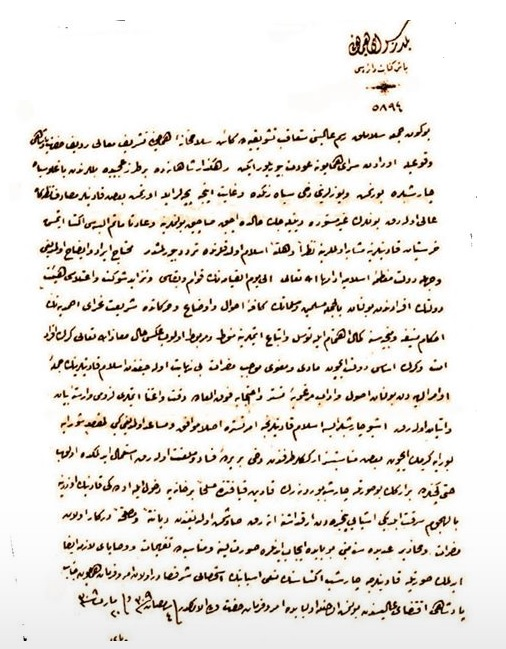
Abdülhamid II's decree dated April 2, 1892, prohibited by the wearing of çarşaf.

Mustafa Kemal had the ambition to make Turkey a new modern secular nation. In 1925, the Turkish government introduced a new Family Law modelled after the Swiss Family Law, and in the same year, it banned Mahmud II's reformation hat for men to be Westernise, the fez. In 1928, the Turkish government removed the official religion provision from the constitution. Mustafa Kemal viewed modern clothing as an essential visual symbol of the new secular nation and encouraged both women and men to wear modern fashion, but in contrast to his law against traditional wear for men, he never introduced a ban against the hijab. However, he appeared in public with his wife Latife Uşaki unveiled and arranged formal state receptions with dinner and dance where men and women could mingle, to encourage women to leave seclusion and adopt modern clothing, and in the mid-1920s, upper- and middle class Turkish women started to appear unveiled in public.

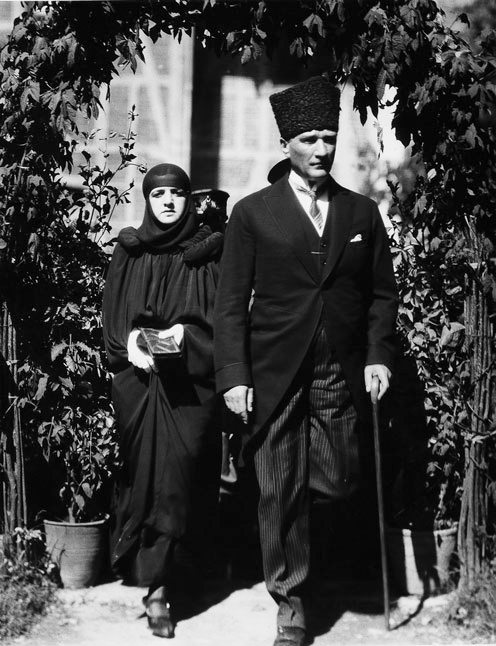
Kemal Atatürk and his wife Latife Uşakizade during a trip to Bursa in 1924

The Republic of Turkey had been a secular state since the constitutional amendment of 1937. Mustafa Kemal Atatürk introduced the secularization of the state in the Turkish Constitution of 1924, alongside his reforms. The suppression of hijab/headscarves and other prominent religious symbols in government institutions and public schools, (similar to policies in France, Quebec and Mexico) led to heated controversy at times in Turkey. Specifically, it resulted in a clash between those favoring the secular principles of the state, such as the Turkish Armed Forces, and religious conservatives, including Islamists. In the early 21st century, the Justice and Development Party (AKP) and its leader Recep Tayyip Erdoğan reversed this, and worked to "raise a pious generation" in Turkey, which in turn created a backlash, even lowering the religiosity among the youth.

=== Banning of headscarves ===
The Turkish government had outlawed the wearing of headscarves by women who work in the public sector in 1982. The ban applied to teachers, lawyers, parliamentarians, and others working on state premises. The ban on headscarves in the civil service and educational and political institutions was expanded to cover non-state institutions. Female lawyers and journalists who refused to comply with the ban were expelled from public buildings such as courtrooms and universities.

In the late 1970s and early 1980s, the number of university students wearing headscarves increased substantially and in 1984, the first widespread application of the headscarf ban came into effect at universities, but throughout the 1980s and 1990s the ban was not uniformly enforced and many students were able to graduate. The headscarf ban in public spaces, including schools and universities (public and private), courts of law, government offices and other official institutions, was only for students, workers and public servants. Hence, mothers of pupils or visitors had no problems at all entering the primary schools, but they were not able to work as teachers. Similarly, at the courts of law, the ban only involved judges, attorneys, lawyers and other workers. Wearing headscarves in photos on official documents like licenses, passports, and university enrollment documents was also prohibited. Universities and schools refused to register women students unless they submitted ID photographs with bared hair and neck.

A regulation dated 16 July 1982, specified that: the clothing and appearances of personnel working at public institutions; the rule that female civil servants' head must be uncovered. An interpretation of this law in 1997 extended the ban to the wearing of headscarves in all universities in Turkey. The debate over headscarves in universities was the most contentious of all and was an important element in the early 21st century politics of Turkey.

==== Education ====
From 1997 to 2013, the Turkish military banned headscarves from all tertiary educational institutions on the ground that they were incompatible with secularism. This ban was lifted after 2013, but there was still a great divide between women who wore headscarves and those who did not when it came to attaining an education. From 2003, when the Justice and Development Party and Recep Tayyip Erdoğan gained power, they stated that they promoted education for women with programs such as "Hey Girls, Let's Go To School". According to journalist Aslı Aydıntaşbaş

Ironically, for [Erdoğan's] generation of ultraconservative communities, wearing the scarf was a woman's ticket to attend school or take part in public life. In that sense, Erdoğan's tenure has provided visibility and access to public life for women who would otherwise be forced to stay home and marry at a young age.

==== Workplace ====
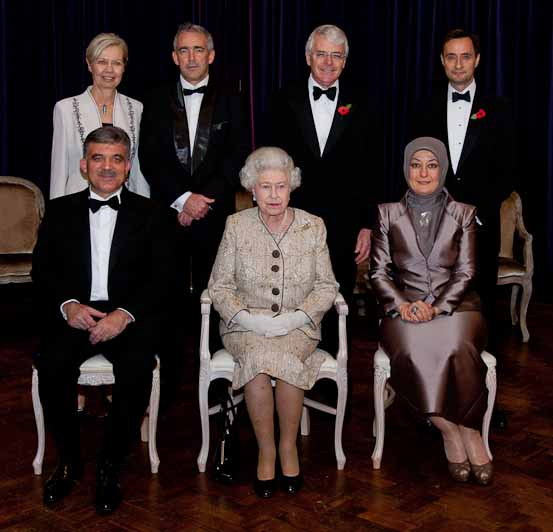
Abdullah Gül's wife, Hayrünisa Gül became the first hijabi first lady in Turkish history

According to Country Reports 2007, women who wore headscarves and their supporters "were disciplined or lost their jobs in the public sector" (US 11 March 2008, Sec. 2.c). Human Rights Watch (HRW) reports that in late 2005, the Administrative Supreme Court ruled that a teacher was not eligible for a promotion in her school because she wore a headscarf outside of work (Jan. 2007). An immigration counselor at the Embassy of Canada in Ankara stated on 27 April 2005 correspondence with the Research Directorate that public servants are not permitted to wear a headscarf while on duty, but headscarved women may be employed in the private sector. On 12 April 2005 correspondence sent to the Research Directorate, a professor of political science specializing in women's issues in Turkey at Boğaziçi University in Istanbul indicated that women who wear a headscarf "could possibly be denied employment in private or government sectors." Conversely, some municipalities with a more traditional constituency might have attempted to hire specifically those women who wear a headscarf (Professor 12 April 2005). The professor did add, however, that headscarved women generally experienced difficulty in obtaining positions as teachers, judges, lawyers, or doctors in the public service (ibid.). More recent or corroborating information on the headscarf ban in the public service could not be found among the sources consulted by the Research Directorate.

The London-based Sunday Times reported that while the ban was officially in place only in the public sphere, many private firms similarly avoided hiring women who wore headscarves (6 May 2007). MERO noted that women who wore headscarves may have had more difficulty finding a job or obtaining a desirable wage (Apr. 2008), although this could not be corroborated among the sources consulted by the Research Directorate.

==== Medical care ====
According to the Sunday Times, headscarves were banned inside Turkish hospitals, and doctors were not allowed to don a headscarf on the job (6 May 2007). Nevertheless, MERO reported that secularists saw Turkey's administration as having a hidden religious agenda (The New York Times 19 February 2008; Washington Post 26 February 2008), doctors in some public hospitals entered the premises wearing headscarves (MERO Apr. 2008).

The professor of political science at Boğaziçi University in Turkey stated that, in addition to never having come across any cases where women wearing headscarves had been denied access to medical care in private or public medical centres, he felt it would be unlikely that this would occur (12 April 2005). The Immigration Counsellor at the Embassy of Canada in Ankara stated that "women who wear headscarves have full access to medical care" (27 April 2005), though news reports and NGO reports to the UN confirmed that women wearing the headscarf had been “denied medical care in Turkish hospitals."

==== Social split ====
In 2010, Turkish American author Elif Batuman, wrote that at least in Istanbul she encountered a Turkey "polarizing into two camps that were increasingly unable to communicate with each other".

There was a new dichotomy I had never heard of before: the "white Turks" (Westernized secular élites in Istanbul and Ankara) versus the "black Turks" (the pious Muslim middle and lower-middle classes of Anatolia).

According to anthropologist Jenny White, the white Turks attitude was infested with racism and classism: black Turks were "the underdogs":

"The term 'Black Turk' is used by Kemalists to disparage Turks of lower-class or peasant heritage, who are considered to be uncivilized, patriarchal, not modern, and mired in Islam, even if they have moved into the middle class."

Recep Tayyip Erdoğan has "proudly" called himself "a black Turk".

Aslı Aydıntaşbaş and Büşra Cebeci wrote that "uncovering", i.e. no longer wearing the headscarf, was a rite of passage for many women escaping "from small-town conservatism" in Turkey, and "may signal the beginning of a movement in the opposite direction" of Erdoğan's Islamization.

While the Turkish state pressured women not to wear headscarves, often family and society pressured women in the opposite direction. Cebeci described the "immense pressure" women felt from relatives "in most cases" when they tried to stop wearing headscarves –

mothers who would not speak to them for months; fathers who lock them up or take them out of school. Some endure beatings. One woman whose story is chronicled in the book ended up in a mental institution until she finally got her family to honor her wish to uncover.

Aydintasbas saw the political forces working to ban hijab and to force women to wear hijab as mirror images, both oppressing women; and both facing resistance.

=== Controversial events ===
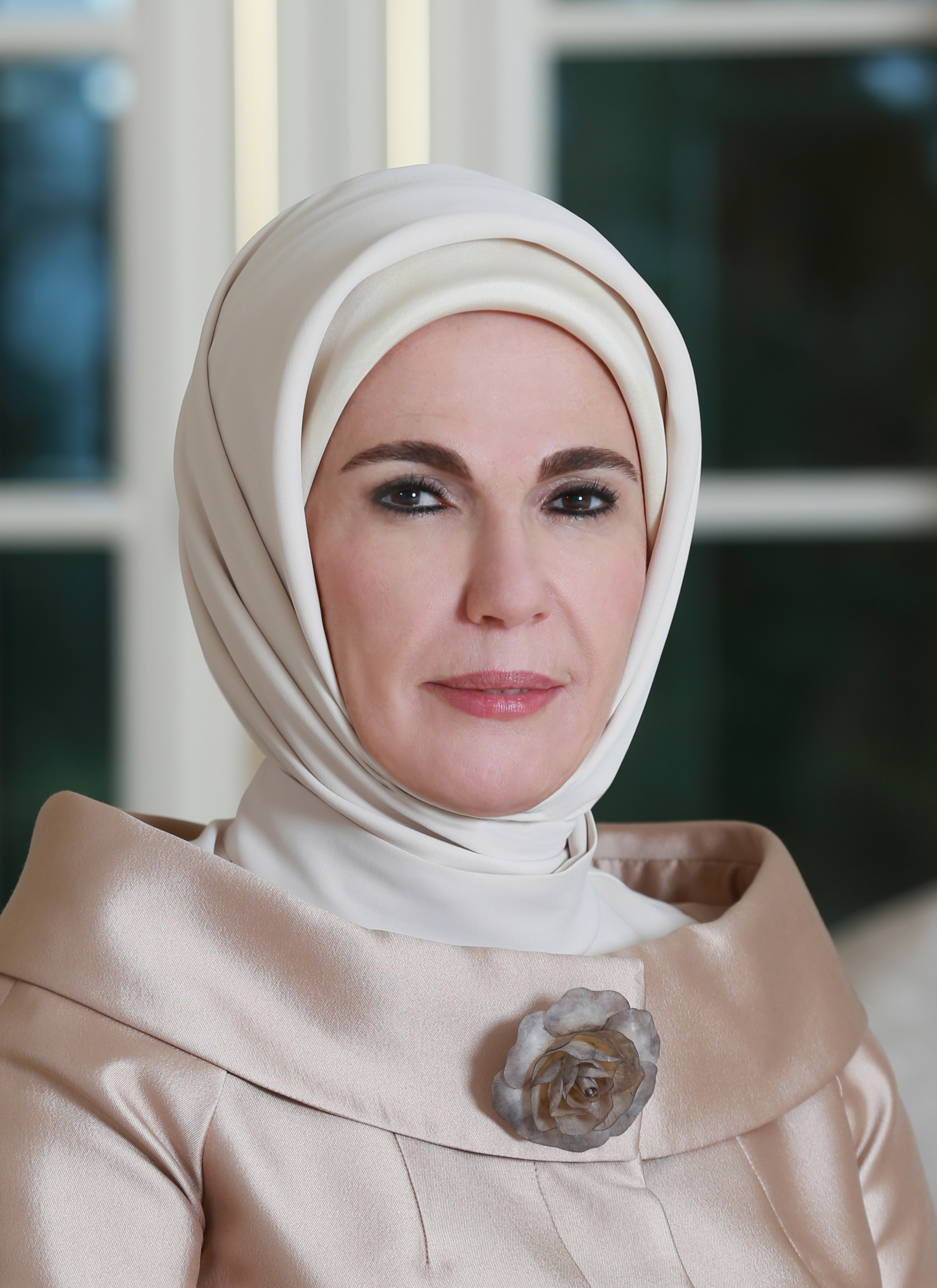
First Lady of Turkey wearing a headscarf. In October 2006, Turkish president Ahmet Necdet Sezer refused to allow politicians whose wives wore headscarves to an event.

- In 1968, a female public university student, Hatice Babacan, refused to remove her headscarf in university buildings.
- In 1998, a Turkish student was banned for wearing a headscarf at Istanbul University.
- In May 1999, the ban on headscarves in the public sphere hit the headlines when Merve Kavakçı was prevented from taking her oath in the National Assembly because she wore a headscarf. She was the newly elected MP of Istanbul of the pro-Islamist Virtue Party, and she refused demands to leave the building. The secular opposition members protested by chanting 'out' for 30 minutes, and the then prime minister Bülent Ecevit accused her of violating the principles of secularism. A state prosecutor investigated whether she might be put on trial for provoking religious hatred. She received much support from Iran, by the Ayatollah Ahmad Jannati, and hundreds of women demonstrating in support of the deputy.
- In 2000, Nuray Bezirgan, a Turkish female student, wore a headscarf at her college final exams. A Turkish court sentenced her to six months in jail for "obstructing the education of others". The European Court of Human Rights upheld the ban in 2004, finding that the law did not violate the European Convention on Human Rights. In October 2006, the European Court of Human Rights upheld the university ban again, rejecting a complaint filed by another Turkish university student.
- In October 2006, Turkish president Ahmet Necdet Sezer refused to allow AKP politicians whose wives wore headscarves to a ball marking Turkish independence, saying it would compromise and undermine the separation of mosque and state in Turkey.
- In late 2008 CHP (Republican People's Party) leader Deniz Baykal surprised supporters by allowing those who wear the çarşaf (chador) to become members of the party. The surprising move was viewed as a strategy to attract conservative voters to the party. Some criticized Baykal's move as an attempt to move the party towards the right.
- In March 2009, Kıymet Özgür, who wore the çarşaf (chador) was attacked by CHP members when she tried to get into an election bus of mayoral candidate Kemal Kılıçdaroğlu in Istanbul. It was later reported that she had disguised herself to test the party's new initiative.

=== Process of lifting the ban ===
Prime Minister Erdoğan campaigned in his victorious 2007 campaign with a promise of lifting the longstanding ban on headscarves in public institutions. However, as the Turkish deputies voted in Parliament, tens of thousands protested outside in favor of the ban.

On February 7, 2008, the Turkish Parliament passed an amendment to the constitution, allowing women to wear the headscarf in Turkish universities, arguing that many women would not seek an education if they could not wear the headscarf. The main political party, the Justice and Development Party, and a key opposition party, the Nationalist Movement Party claimed that it was an issue of human rights and freedoms. The Parliament voted 403–107 (a majority of 79 per cent) in favor of the first amendment, which was inserted into the constitution stating that everyone has the right to equal treatment from state institutions. However, the move resulted in opposition throughout Turkey. The country's educational board and numerous universities vowed to defy the new law. In addition, the main pro-secular, opposition party of the Republican People's Party asked the constitutional court to block the new law passed and viewed it as a move towards an Islamic state. Thousands of demonstrators supporting the ban also gathered near the Parliament against the move by the government.

After the failed attempt at lifting the ban against headscarves in public institutions in 2008, the Justice and Development Party arranged constitutional amendments in 2010 that would lead to lifting the ban against wearing headscarves in Turkish educational institutions. On October 8, 2013, the ban was lifted specifically at universities and government positions unless uniform was required, such as the military, police, and judiciary. With the support of the Council of Higher Education, the Justice and Development Party was able to persuade women who wore headscarves to return to school. Two years later, the lift on the ban extended to judiciary roles in 2015 and the year following 2016, to the Turkish police force.

==== Lifting of ban annulled ====
On 5 June 2008, Turkey's Constitutional Court annulled the parliament's proposed amendment intended to lift the headscarf ban, ruling that removing the ban was against the founding principles of the constitution. The highest court's decision to uphold the headscarf ban could not be appealed (AP 7 June 2008).

==== More ban liftings ====
Headscarves had become a focal point of the conflict between the ruling Justice and Development Party (AKP) and the secularist establishment. The ruling was widely seen as a victory for Turks who claimed this maintained Turkey's separation of state and religion. In 2013, the headscarf ban in public institutions was lifted through a decree. The ban on wearing hijab in high schools ended in 2014.

In March 2017, the Ministry of Defence in Ankara announced a change in rules to allow women in the armed forces to wear headscarves with their uniforms, which sparked concerns from secularists over creeping Islamisation of the military.

In October 2022, ahead of the 2023 election, Turkey's government and opposition both pledged legal steps to establish women's right to wear Islamic headscarves, bringing an issue that previously caused severe splits back to the forefront of political discourse.

== See also ==
- Conservatism in Turkey
- Leyla Şahin v. Turkey
- Islamic dress in Europe
- Islam and clothing
- Islam in Turkey
- Secularism in Turkey
- Freedom of religion in Turkey
- Merve Kavakçı
- Snow (Pamuk novel)
- Kemalism
- Human rights in Turkey
- White Turks
- Black Turks
- Political polarization in Turkey

== Bibliography ==
- Fromm, Ali Çarkoğlu, Binnaz Toprak; translated from Turkish by Çiğdem Aksoy (2007). Religion, Society and Politics in a Changing Turkey (PDF). Karaköy, İstanbul: TESEV publications. p. 64. ISBN 978-975-8112-90-6. Archived from the original (PDF) on 2021-02-21.
