= Irreligion in Turkey =

Irreligion in Turkey is the lack, rejection of, or indifference towards religion in the Republic of Turkey. Precise estimates of the share of deists, atheists, agnostics, and other unaffiliated people in the population vary, although various demographic surveys report that they constitute a larger percentage than Christians and Jews in the country.

One study in Turkey reported that 95% believe in God while 74% identify as "religious". Another study conducted by the French company Ipsos which interviewed 17,180 adults across 22 countries, stated that atheists accounted for 7% of those who were interviewed from Turkey, while agnostics accounted for 3%.

== Overview ==
It is difficult to quantify the number of deists, atheists, and agnostics in Turkey, as they are not officially counted in the Turkish national census, unlike Christians, Jews, and other religious groups. But religious information on both online and physical identity cards can either be blanked out or changed on the wish of the ID holder by request, via either a visit to the local municipal office or an e-signature in the official government website or app. Data also suggests that 85% of all irreligious people in Turkey are younger than 35.

However, irreligion being freely expressed or discussed in the public is far from being uncommon.

According to a poll made by MAK (Mehmet Ali Kulat of Ankara) in 2017, 86% of the Turkish population declared they believe in God. 76% declared they believe that the Quran and other holy books came through revelation by God, while 14% said that they don't believe that it did, and 10% did not answer. According to another poll made in 2019 by OPTİMAR, which interviewed 3,500 people 89.5% of those interviewed declared they believe in Islam, while 4.5% identified as Deists, 2.7% identified as agnostics, and 1.6% as atheists.

A survey conducted by MAK in 2020 found that among the Turkish people interviewed, more than 8,000 young adults between the ages of 18 and 29 (82.8%) of the Turkish young adults identified "as a person who has religious beliefs", while 7.7% reported they have no belief, 9.5% gave no reply, and 72.7% believed in the afterlife, while 11.7% did not believe in it and 15.6% gave no reply. Another poll conducted by Gezici Araştırma in 2020 interviewed 1,062 people in 12 provinces and found that 28.5% of the Generation Z in Turkey identify as irreligious.

An early April 2018 report of the Turkish Ministry of Education, titled The Youth is Sliding towards Deism, observed that an increasing number of pupils in İmam Hatip schools was repudiating Islam in favour of Deism (irreligious belief in a creator God). The report's publication generated large-scale controversy amongst conservative Islamic sects, Muslim clerics, and Islamist parties in Turkey. The progressive Muslim theologian Mustafa Öztürk noted the Deistic trend among Turkish people a year earlier, arguing that the "very archaic, dogmatic notion of religion" held by the majority of those claiming to represent Islam was causing "the new generations [to get] indifferent, even distant, to the Islamic worldview". Despite lacking reliable statistical data, numerous anecdotes and independent surveys appear to point in this direction. Although some commentators claim that the secularization of Turkey is the reason behind such a change, other commentators insist otherwise.

== Statistics ==
Religion in Turkey (Optimar survey, 2019)
1. Islam (89.5%)
2. Irreligion (Deism) (4.50%)
3. Irreligion (Agnosticism) (2.70%)
4. Irreligion (Atheism) (1.70%)
5. Other Religions (Christianity, Baháʼí Faith, Judaism, Tengrism, Yazidism) (0.50%)
6. Unanswered (1.10%)
Religiosity among Turks (KONDA survey, 2018)
1. Fully devout (10.0%)
2. Religious (51.0%)
3. Not religious (34.0%)
4. Non-believer (2.00%)
5. Atheist (3.00%)

Belief in God and religious organizations among Turks, OPTİMAR Survey 2019:

- 89.5 % responded "I believe in God's existence and oneness." (Believer)
- 4.5 % responded "I think there is a creator, but I don't believe in religions." (Deist)
- 2.7 % responded "I'm not sure if there is a creator." (Agnostic)
- 1.7 % responded "I don't think there is a creator." (Atheist)
- 1.7 % responded no answer.

Religiosity of Turkish people, KONDA 2018:

- 51% defined themselves as "a religious person who strives to fulfill religious obligations" (Religious)
- 34% defined themselves as "a believer who does not fulfill religious obligations" (Not religious).
- 10% defined themselves as "a fully devout person fulfilling all religious obligations" (Fully devout).
- 2% defined themselves as "someone who does not believe in religious obligations" (Non-believer).
- 3% defined themselves as "someone with no religious conviction" (Atheist).

Among those aged between 15 and 29 years old:

- 43% defined themselves as "a religious person who strives to fulfill religious obligations" (Religious)
- 45% defined themselves as "a believer who does not fulfill religious obligations" (Not religious).
- 5% defined themselves as "a fully devout person fulfilling all religious obligations" (Fully devout).
- 4% defined themselves as "someone who does not believe in religious obligations" (Non-believer).
- 4% defined themselves as "someone with no religious conviction" (Atheist).

Among those aged between 15 and 20 old:

- 55.8% defined themselves as "a believer who does not fulfill religious obligations" (Not religious).
- 28.5% defined themselves as "Irreligious" (Non-believer).
- 15.7% defined themselves as "a religious person who fulfills religious obligations such as fasting and praying" (Religious).

Data from various surveys
Source	Islam	No religion	Christianity	Other religions and no reply
KONDA (2021)^{(rounded figures)}	94%	5%	0.2%	0.8%
Gezici (2020, Generation Z only)	71.5%	28.5%	N/A	N/A
Optimar (2019)	89%	8.9%	0.3%	1.1%
World Values Survey (2017)	98.0%	1.2%	N/A	0.8
MAK (2017)	86%	12.5%	0.5%	1%
Ipsos (2016)	82%	13%	2%	3%
Pew Research Center (2016)	98%	1.2%	0.4%	0.4%
KONDA (2008)	97%	2%	0.2%	0.8%
Sabancı University (2006)	98.3%	1.5%	0.2%	N/A
Government official numbers	99.8%	N/A	0.2%	N/A

== Irreligious organizations in Turkey ==
Association of Atheism (Ateizm Derneği), the first official atheist organization based in the Middle East and Caucasus, was founded in 2014. In 2018, it was reported in some media outlets that the Ateizm Derneği would close down because of the pressure on its members and attacks by pro-government media, but the association itself issued a clarification that this was not the case and that it was still active.

== List of famous irreligious Turks ==
- Abdullah Cevdet
- Adalet Ağaoğlu
- Ahmet Altan
- Ahmet Rıza
- Ahmet Şık
- Arzu Toker
- Ayşe Önal
- Aziz Nesin
- Bahadır Baruter
- Barbaros Şansal
- Bedri Baykam
- Behice Boran
- Can Yücel
- Celâl Şengör
- Cenk Uygur
- Çetin Altan
- Deniz Gezmiş
- Diamond Tema
- Dilsa Demirbag Sten
- Dursun Karataş
- Efe Aydal
- Fazıl Say
- Fikret Kızılok
- Halil Berktay
- İbrahim Kaypakkaya
- İlhan İrem
- İlyas Salman
- Jahrein
- Lale Mansur
- Mihri Belli
- Mîna Urgan
- Muazzez İlmiye Çığ
- Murat Belge
- Mustafa Kemal Atatürk
- Nâzım Hikmet
- Osman Necmi Gürmen
- Pelin Batu
- Ruhi Su
- Sagopa Kajmer
- Serra Yılmaz
- Sevan Nişanyan
- Sinan Çetin
- Süreyyya Evren
- Tevfik Fikret
- Turan Dursun
- Uğur Uluocak
- Ulus Baker

== See also ==
- Black Turks
- Christianity in Turkey
- Conservatism in Turkey
- Demographics of Turkey
- Freedom of religion in Turkey
- Islam in Turkey
- Religion in Turkey
- Secularism in Turkey
- White Turks
- Xenophobia and discrimination in Turkey
