= Political polarization in Turkey =

Bimodal distribution. Political polarization in Turkey is bimodal.

Political polarization is the bimodal distribution, meaning that two obvious peaks of opinion in the political sense. It can be observed through people's choices, sociopolitical approaches, and even where they live. In the last years, political polarization has caused many political results in the governments and the law-making organs. However it may not be classified as a "negative" aspect, and it can be used by politicians to examine the social and economic parts to develop in a country. Citizens would be more prone to do skeptical analysis on the subjects, and gain more meaning in their lives. Mexico, Turkey, India, South Africa, Brazil and Venezuela are amongst the countries that have the highest polarization.

== History ==
Turkey is different from other western countries as the multi-party system was imposed from the top-down rather than the bottom-up. This is the basis of polarization in Turkey.

The political parties in the Turkish governmental system started with the Second Constitutional Era during the Ottoman Empire when in 1908, the constitution was released and the response from the country was establishing opposing and supporting organizations and parties. Turkey has always been a country of many different ideologies. There have been periods of time people defined themselves according to their political views. There are different classifications of ideologies in the Turkish system. Most common two of these classifications are based on religion and ethnicity. The debate in religion is between the Sunni Islam (define themselves as right) and secularism (define themselves as left).

In democracies, the NGO's make the connection between the government and the citizens. However, in Turkey as the NGO's are not that effective the political parties have tried to lead this, and thus politics have become more of a conflict zone among the politicians. It is safe to say that polarization has transformed many aspects of the country from media to social relations. Political polarization is more than just a political concept; it affects and is affected by many factors, such as coalition governments, multi-party legislatures, great wage gap, multiethnic societies, and a low level of trust.

In 1946, twenty six years after the founding of the parliament, the multi-party elections started in Turkey, and since then the politics have been one of the main subjects of focus.

=== 1950s–2001 ===
Logo of Democrat Party (DP), founded in 1946 and had been in power in Turkey for 10 years between 1950-1960.

Polarization in the modern Turkey is believed to date back to the Democrat Party (DP) which started a populist approach that socio-economic status is more important for politics than the cultural revolutionaries, in which it resulted in getting more democratic but also started a populist era. CHP was the "government's party", and DP was the "government of the party".

In 1960's there was a change in the population; there was migrations, urbanization, and industrialization. The time between 1961 and 1965 is referred as a period when there was no polarization or bias but only small ideological differences. However when CHP was not successful in either 1965 or 1969 elections, to get in more supported position in politics, they stated that they were a center left party. This started a more scientifically termed political polarization as referred to today: it is right vs. left rather than the older definition traditionalist vs. modernist. When in 1969 elections the government's decision was that small parties could not enter the legislature, it meant that there would be no opposition which caused more tension.

Since the 1970s, the fragmentation has been a part of electoral politics. In 1969–1970 the student protest begun, followed by 12 March 1971 when the army arrested the anarchist students. After 12 March, the extreme left and right newspapers were closed. But with the 1974 Act of Indemnity, the leftist organizations remerged.

In the 1990s the coalition governments and fight for power government had created fragmentations.

=== 2001–Gezi Protests ===
The main belief is that there was no sharp boundaries between groups before the 2002 elections, and that, after the election that elected then-Prime Minister Erdoğan the elections became much more competitive compared to the past. In 2015 the Comparative Study of Electoral System based on the Dalton Index classified Turkey as one of the 38 countries that are most polarized. Another example that supports this is the World Values Survey that suggests in 1990, 40 percent of citizens identified as "centre", while in 2007 this number dropped to 13 percent; and the "extreme" end citizens increased from 12 percent to 24 percent.

It is explained as Erdoğan became more authoritative after being elected for the third term, and independent of Erdoğan's behavior, some ideologies in Turkey feel ‘not represented’ due to the high polarization that has prevented other ideologies from entering the assembly as much as needed. While the pro-Erdoğan group of society sees this time period as a period of democratization and development; the anti-Erdoğan group believes that it is democratic breakdown and authoritarian.

In both 2014 and 2018 elections, both the support and the fierce opposition to Erdoğan was observably high that Erdoğan won 2014 elections with 51.8% and 2018 elections with 52.6%.

=== Impact of Gezi Park Protests ===
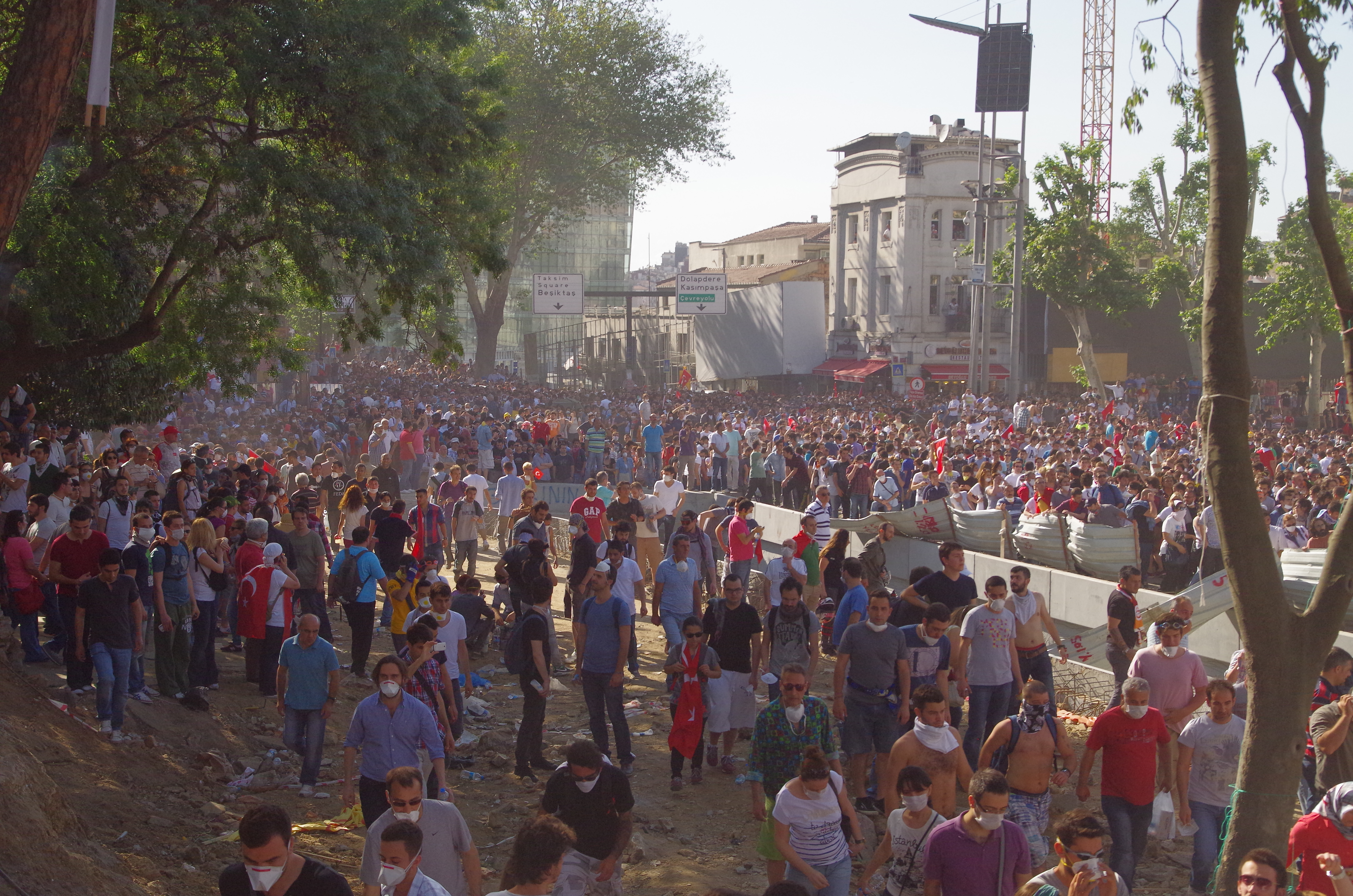
Gezi Park protests

There have been episodes leading to a bimodal polarity in Turkey, and Gezi Park protests classify as one. Gezi Parkı protests are actually a milestone seen as the time people started to observe the polarization and political situation. The participants were from many different generations and ideologies, and most were opposed to the authoritarian approach of the Justice and Development Party (AKP) and demanded real democracy. Yet, surprisingly, a survey conducted on the protestors had shown that 70 percent of the participants did not identify themselves as ‘close to any party’, and 37 percent are expecting a new political party. Though Gezi Parkı protests were started due to environmental reasons, they became a political opinion and stood up.

=== Post-Gezi–Present ===
The effect of polarization on social relations can be best observed by the 2016 survey result that 74% of people would not approve their children play with a children who has parents of different opinions about elections and who to vote for.

In the 2017 Referendum, the bimodal polarity was seen in the Twitter hashtags.

In the 31 March 2019 election, there were two alignments formed. One of them was the Nation Alignment which included CHP, Good Party and Felicity Party. The other side was the Public Alignment which included MHP and AK Party. However HDP announced that they were not a part of both alignments.

== Media ==
=== Social media ===
Gezi Park protests can also be shown as the period of time when the social media became very effective in the polarization, most probably as it demonstrated the opinions of people through numbers and statistics. The week when the Gezi Park protests first started, there were 3,600,000 activists in 80 provinces (out of 81) of Turkey. Twitter users in Turkey increased from 1.8 million to 9.5 million within the first five days of the start of the protests, and 13 million tweets were shared with the hashtag #direngeziparki (#resistgezipark).

The aim of using social media was to go beyond what people called the "penguin media" (mainstream media corporations such as CNN Türk that aired documentaries of penguins instead of discussing the ongoing protests at the time), and create the media content on their own. Some tweets examined the examples of polarization through obvious comparisons as such "the right side" and "the left side", however the point where the "us vs. them" sayings were started to use is when the Prime minister at the time used to word "çapulcu" (Turkish for "looter") to label the protestors. Even if at the time this word was only used for the Gezi supporters, now it is in the Turkish contemporary political vocabulary.

With the neutral hashtags on Twitter such as #Gezi and #GeziPark, there were also non-neutral Gezi supportive hashtags (#direngezi (#resistgezi), #geziyiunutma (#dontforgetgezi)), and also non-neutral Gezi-opposite hashtags, and all of them are still tweeted about (2019 research shows). Even if the Gezi movement had no leader, today the ruling party classifies the Gezi supporters with the CHP supporters, and other minorities.

Gezi is known as a "Twitter revolution", similar to that of the Umbrella Movement of Hong Kong. Even if Twitter was the primary social media platform, Facebook was the platform involved in discussions, and YouTube was the address of many videos.

In 2018 Turkish elections, the two poles were obviously observed with the government supporters tweeting #devam (#continue), and the opponents tweeting #tamam (#enough).

During the period before and after the 2017 Turkish constitutional referendum, partisan asymmetries and mood swings induced by transient events were also considered to be latent factors behind the seasonal behavior differences observed between the two sides of referendum, i.e., social media communities supporting yes-vote and no-vote.

=== Media ===
Media in Turkey have been owned by different groups which are capital groups that have close relations with the state. The media streaming in Turkey has been classified under three groups recently, which are mainstream media that are close to the government, the international media (such as the BBC, and Deutsche Welle), and the opposition media (such as Sözcü, and BirGün).

In 2018, Reporters Without Borders decided that Turkey is 157th amongst the 180 countries in the Press Freedom Index.

== Civic media and other initiatives ==
Even if the 140journos project started before the Gezi Park protests, it gained momentum with the protest. It was based on the idea that the government sometimes demonizes the social media platform. It is a citizen journalism platform, where people report, and there is no partisanship. It is a neutral platform, the use of provocateur language is forbidden -as the vocabulary used in the Turkish language might be partisan with very small differences, and all of the news are verified before published. The identification is that it is not an impartial organization however it is a multi-partial platform. It is now found on many different technology platforms such as Ekşi Sözlük, Twitter, Periscope, Snapchat, WhatsApp, Facebook and Instagram.

There are different initiatives that aim to go beyond political polarization in Turkey, such as Oy ve Ötesi (Vote and Beyond), which is a neutral initiative that can be found on Twitter and Facebook. They had 30,000 volunteers that have monitored 95% of the polling stations in local elections in Istanbul in March 2014. Their goal is to create transparent elections through being unbiased and equidistant to all sides of the elections.

== Coronavirus effects ==
The 2020 Coronavirus pandemic has affected Turkey like many other countries. The most polarization was obvious in the fundraising held by different municipalities that are connected to different political parties. The donations became a way of showing support to a part rather than just focusing on public health.

== See also ==
- Politics of Turkey
- Secularism in Turkey
  - White Turks
  - Kemalism
- Conservatism in Turkey
  - Black Turks
  - Erdoğanism
- Religion in Turkey
- Freedom of religion in Turkey
