= Yavuz Ağıralioğlu =

Turkish politician (born 1972)

- Ağıralioğlu in 2024

Leader of the Key Party
- Incumbent
- Assumed office 30 October 2024
- Preceded by: party established

Member of the Grand National Assembly of Turkey
- In office 7 July 2018 – 14 May 2023
- Constituency: Istanbul (1st)

Personal details
- Born: 1 February 1972 (age 54) Çaykara, Trabzon, Turkey
- Party: Key Party (2024–present)
- Other political affiliations: Great Unity Party (1997–2011); Good Party (2018–2023)
- Education: Ankara University
- Occupation: Politician, businessman

Yavuz Ağıralioğlu (born 1 February 1972) is a Turkish politician and businessman. He served as a member of the Grand National Assembly of Turkey for Istanbul from 2018 to 2023, was a deputy leader and spokesman of the Good Party (İYİ Parti), and founded the Key Party (Turkish: Anahtar Parti) in October 2024, leading it since.

== Early life and education ==
Ağıralioğlu was born in the Eğridere village of Çaykara, Trabzon, and grew up in Sorgun, Yozgat, where he completed his schooling. He graduated in international relations from the Faculty of Political Science of Ankara University.

== Political career ==
He was chairman of the Nizam-ı Alem Ocakları between 1995 and 1997, and later served on the central executive board and as a deputy leader of the Great Unity Party (BBP) under Muhsin Yazıcıoğlu; in 2011 he stood for the party leadership. Since 2011 he has chaired the Turkey Initiative Centre.

Ağıralioğlu joined the Good Party in May 2018 and was elected MP for Istanbul in the June 2018 election, serving as the party's parliamentary group deputy chairman from 2018 to 2019, as spokesman from 2019 to 2020, and as head of its Turkish world and diaspora section from 2020 to 2022. He left the party in March 2023.

After the 2024 local elections he announced the formation of a new party and founded the Key Party on 30 October 2024.
