= Key Party (Turkey) =

Key Party Anahtar Parti
- Abbreviation: A Parti
- Leader: Yavuz Ağıralioğlu
- General Secretary: Nihal Ağca
- Founder: Yavuz Ağıralioğlu
- Founded: 30 October 2024
- Split from: Good Party
- Headquarters: Çankaya
- Membership (2026): ▲142,083
- Ideology: Turkish–Islamic synthesis Turkish nationalism Pan-Turkism; Islamokemalism; National conservatism
- Political position: Center-right to right-wing
- Colors: Blue and white
- Grand National Assembly: 0 / 600
- Municipal Assemblies: 6 / 20,953

Website
- anahtarparti.org

The Key Party (Turkish: Anahtar Parti, abbr. A Parti) is a political party established in Turkey on 30 October 2024. Its official abbreviation is "A Parti". The chairman and founder is Yavuz Ağıralioğlu.

== History ==
Yavuz Ağıralioğlu was a candidate for Istanbul mayor in 2018 for the İYİ Party. He continued his career in the İYİ Party before leaving it in 2023 due to its alliance with the CHP, as he staunchly opposed Kemal Kılıçdaroğlu. Ağıralioğlu claimed that he felt very worthless in the İYİ Party. He made an appointment to meet with Meral Akşener before resigning from the İYİ Party, although it was canceled as Akşener did not consider the meeting important. Ağıralioğlu, who ideologically supported the Turkish–Islamic synthesis, had a background in the Great Unity Party. Ağıralioğlu criticized and opposed the policies of the CHP, AKP and MHP on Abdullah Öcalan, especially after Devlet Bahçeli invited Öcalan to the Grand National Assembly of Turkey. After forming the Key Party on October 30, 2024, he was joined by many İYİ Party members. The main policies of the Key Party are national conservatism and the Turkish–Islamic synthesis.

== Leadership ==
=== Party leaders ===
Founded on October 30, 2024, the people who have served as the chairperson of the Key Party so far are as follows.

| # | Leader (birth–death) | Portrait | Took office | Left office | Term of Office |
|---|---|---|---|---|---|
| 1 | Yavuz Ağıralioğlu; February 1, 1972 (age 54) | | October 30, 2024 | Incumbent | 2 years, 24 days |

=== Board ===
| # | Name | Mission |
|---|---|---|
| 1 | Yavuz Ağıralioğlu | Chairperson |
| 2 | Nihal Ağca | General Secretary |
| 3 | Ayhan Erel | Head of Organization |
| 4 | Fuat Geçen | Head of Political Affairs |
| 5 | Zafer Demir | Head of Administrative and Financial Affairs |
| 6 | Alperen Dicle | Head of Development Policies |
| 7 | Emine Küçükali | Head of Environment, Urbanization, Disaster and Water Policies |
| 8 | Prof. Dr. Recep Kök | Head of Economic Policies |
| 9 | Hasan Hüseyin Demiröz | Head of Agricultural Policies |
| 10 | Prof. Dr. Özcan Güngör | Head of R&D In-Party Training School |
| 11 | Prof. Dr. Oğuz Sadık Aydos | Head of Legal Policies |
| 12 | Hatice Ceren Yılmaz | Head of Electoral Affairs |
| 13 | Mehmet Batu Müftüoğlu | Head of Corporate Affairs |
| 14 | Beril Gümüş | Head of Women, Family and Social Policies |
| 15 | Hayati Çetin | Head of NGO Affairs |
| 16 | Prof. Dr. Fatih Yalçın | Head of Education Policies |
| 17 | Prof. Dr. Mehmet Zeki İşcan | Head of Sociological Policies |
| 18 | Ali Işıner Hamşioğlu | Head of Media and Publicity |
| 19 | Tahir Keskinkılıç | Head of Turkish World and International Relations |
| 20 | Adnan Süphanoğlu | Head of Local Governments |
| 21 | Muhammed Hakan Tanrıöver | Head of Culture and Tourism Policies |
| 22 | Seydi Ömer Ekinci | Advisor to the Chairperson (Responsible for Information Technologies) |

=== Central Board of Directors ===
| # | Name |
|---|---|
| 1 | Adnan Süphanoğlu |
| 2 | Ahmet Ali Kaplan |
| 3 | Ali Çelik |
| 4 | Ali Işıner Hamşioğlu |
| 5 | Alper Tatlı |
| 6 | Alperen Dicle |
| 7 | Ayhan Erel |
| 8 | Beril Gümüş |
| 9 | Bilgehan Bayramoğlu |
| 10 | Doç. Dr. Burcu Zeybek |
| 11 | Burhanettin Gökhan Eşeli |
| 12 | Cem Cebir |
| 13 | Elif Uzel Kurucu |
| 14 | Emine Küçükali |
| 15 | Enes Malik Saran |
| 16 | Ekrem Şentürk |
| 17 | Ertuğrul Ülker |
| 18 | Ergün Yıldız |
| 19 | Prof. Dr. Fatih Yalçın |
| 20 | Fatih Rüştü Kayıran |
| 21 | Fuat Geçen |
| 22 | Hakan Çağlar Erürker |
| 23 | Hasan Hüseyin Demiröz |
| 24 | Hatice Ceren Yılmaz |
| 25 | Hayati Çetin |
| 26 | Hilal Güntülü Kavuncu Demirtaş |
| 27 | Hüseyin Çakır |
| 28 | Hüseyin Sezgi |
| 29 | İbrahim Önal |
| 30 | İsmail Burçin Öğüt |
| 31 | Mazhar Gökhan Özdemir |
| 32 | Mehmet Batu Müftüoğlu |
| 33 | Mehmet Ejder Demir |
| 34 | Prof. Dr. Mehmet Gümüş |
| 35 | Prof. Dr. Mehmet Zeki İşcan |
| 36 | Mehtap Nazan Göktaş |
| 37 | Memduh Atalay |
| 38 | Muhammed Hakan Tanrıöver |
| 39 | Murat Özcan |
| 40 | Murat Uçar |
| 41 | Musa Malik Yıldırım |
| 42 | Mustafa Arslan |
| 43 | Mustafa Can |
| 44 | Nigar Ayyıldız |
| 45 | Nihal Ağca |
| 46 | Prof. Dr. Oğuz Sadık Aydos |
| 47 | Ömer Sarıoğlu |
| 48 | Prof. Dr. Özcan Güngör |
| 49 | Prof. Dr. Recep Kök |
| 50 | Sabahattin Aday |
| 51 | Salih Yılmaz |
| 52 | Sami Çırakoğlu |
| 53 | Sedat Ayhan |
| 54 | Sedat Yalçın |
| 55 | Prof. Dr. Selma Yel |
| 56 | Seydi Ömer Ekinci |
| 57 | Tahir Keskinkılıç |
| 58 | Tuncay Şan |
| 59 | Uğur Kaya |
| 60 | Sidar Duman |
| 61 | Zafer Demir |

=== Central Disciplinary Board ===
| # | Name |
|---|---|
| 1 | Ali Burak Doğan |
| 2 | Elif Uzel Kurucu |
| 3 | İlker Bozatlıoğlu |
| 4 | Mustafa Uysal |
| 5 | Yusuf Ergin |
| 6 | Ebru Avcı Başaran |
| 7 | Emre Furkan Oruç |
| 8 | Fazıl Baturalp Çubukçu |
| 9 | Mahmut Saklı |
| 10 | Selma Özdemir |
| 11 | Samet Enes Öztürk |

=== Founding members ===
Name
- Adnan Süphanoğlu
- Abdullah Toksoy
- Ahmet Baydaroğlu
- Ahmet Ali Kaplan
- Ahmet Bingöl
- Ahmet Murat Hatabay
- Ahmet Onur Yazıcıoğlu
- Akif Turaç
- Alaattin Karamert
- Ali Çelik
- Ali Işıner Hamşioğlu
- Ali Burak Doğan
- Dr. Alper Dursun Şağban
- Alper Tatlı
- Alperen Dicle
- Avni Naci Doğan
- Ayhan Çambel
- Ayhan Erel
- Doç. Dr. Aysun Öcal
- Aysel Kırali
- Begüm Pekcan
- Prof. Dr. Bener Güngör
- Beril Gümüş
- Bilgehan Bayramoğlu
- Doç. Dr. Burcu Zeybek
- Burhan Aygün
- Burhanettin Gökhan Eşeli
- Cem Cebir
- Cemalettin Gürler
- Doğan Öztaşkın
- Ebru Avcı Başaran
- Ekrem Şentürk
- Elif Uzel Kurucu
- Elif Tükenmez
- Emine Küçükali
- Emre Furkan Oruç
- Enes Malik Saran
- Emre Görmez
- Doç. Dr. Enver Demirpolat
- Ergün Yıldız
- Dr. Erhan Oktay
- Erkan Güneş
- Ernail Akbulut
- Ertuğrul Ülker
- Fatih Arslan
- Prof. Dr. Fatih Yalçın
- Fatin Rüştü Kayıran
- Fatma Ceren Taşdemir
- Fazıl Baturalp Çubukçu
- Ferhat Tak
- Fethi Ayan
- Fikret Aslan
- Fuat Geçen
- Gültekin Cavlı
- Hacı Mevlüt Zavlak
- Hakan Sarı
- Prof. Dr. Halil Özşavlı
- Halil İbrahim Abdik
- Hasan Hüseyin Demiröz
- Hakan Çağlar Erürker
- Dr. Hasan Sami Özvarinli
- Hatice Ceren Yılmaz
- Hatice Kübra Yüksel
- Hayati Çetin
- Hayrettin Mermer
- Hulusi Aksu
- Hüseyin Balcı
- Hüseyin Çakır
- Hilal Güntülü Kavuncu Demirtaş
- Hüseyin Sezgi
- İbrahim Önal
- Dr. İdris Ahmet Çakır
- İlker Bozatlıoğlu
- İsmail Burçin Öğüt
- Kamil Karataş
- Kenan Güvenç
- Köksal Kurç
- Dr. Mahmut Münir Güzel
- Mahmut Saklı
- Mazhar Gökhan Özdemir
- Mehmet Ali Gül
- Mehmet Batu Müftüoğlu
- Mehmet Ejder Demir
- Prof. Dr. Mehmet Akıncı
- Prof. Dr. Mehmet Zeki İşcan
- Mehtap Nazan Göktaş
- Melek Güney
- Prof. Dr. Mehmet Gümüş
- Melih Selçuk
- Memduh Atalay
- Metehan Burak Mert
- Muhammed Fatih Danış
- Muhammed Hakan Tanrıöver
- Murat Albayrak
- Murat Bünyamin Çatal
- Dr. Öğr. Gör. Murat Karataş
- Murat Özcan
- Murat Tekin
- Murat Uçar
- Muhammet Kayhan
- Murtaza Karanfil
- Musa Malik Yıldırım
- Mustafa Arslan
- Mustafa Can
- Mustafa Seyhan Toplaoğlu
- Mustafa Şahin
- Mustafa Uysal
- Mustafa Karacan
- Nadir Dallı
- Nalan Oğuz
- Necip Yavuz
- Nigar Ayyıldız
- Nihal Ağca
- Dr. Nurettin Kalkan
- Prof. Dr. Oğuz Sadık Aydos
- Orhan Kayhan
- Oğuzhan Bilgin
- Ömer Sarıoğlu
- Prof. Dr. Özcan Güngör
- Prof. Dr. Özkan Görgülü
- Özcan Hacıhasanoğlu
- Prof. Dr. Recep Kök
- Rızvan Aksoy
- Prof. Dr. Salih Yılmaz
- Samet Enes Öztürk
- Samet Meletli
- Sabahattin Aday
- Sami Çırakoğlu
- Sedat Yalçın
- Selçuk Usta
- Selen Tuğba Camadan
- Selma Özdemir
- Prof. Dr. Selma Yel
- Serbülent Vatanoğlu
- Sedat Ayhan
- Serdar Sezen
- Serhat Pekmezci
- Sevim Demir
- Seydi Ömer Ekinci
- Sezgin Gümüş
- Sezin Türkkal
- Sidar Duman
- Şenol Aydın
- Tayfun Şahlanoğlu
- Tahir Keskinkılıç
- Tuncay Şan
- Uğur Kaya
- Dr. Varol Tosun
- Vehip Danış
- Dr. Öğr. Üy. Uğur Caba
- Yavuz Ağıralioğlu
- Yavuz Güngör
- Yusuf Ocak
- Yakup Karadeniz
- Yusuf Ergin
- Zafer Demir
- Zeki Demirtaşoğlu
- Zeki Sertan Çelik
