= Conservative democracy =

Turkish political term to describe Islamic democracy

Conservative democracy (Turkish: muhafazakâr demokrasi) is a label coined by the ruling Justice and Development Party (AKP) of Turkey to describe Islamic democracy. Forming as a modernist breakaway party from former Islamist movements, the AKP's conservative democratic ideology has been described as a departure from or moderation of Islamic democracy and the endorsement of more secular and democratic values. The electoral success and the neo-Ottoman foreign policy of the AKP that aims to broaden Turkey's regional influence has led to the party's conservative democratic ideals to be mirrored in other countries, such as by the Justice and Development Party in Morocco and the Ennahda Movement in Tunisia.

In its broadest sense, the term conservative democracy highlights the compatibility of Islam with democracy, a Western-oriented foreign policy, neoliberal economics and secularism within government. Since the view has been reflected in several economic, foreign, domestic and social policy initiatives, the term conservative democracy has been referred to as a floating signifier that encompasses a broad coalition of ideas. In contrast, and because of its broad definition, the term has also been accused of being a red herring designed to conceal a hidden Islamist agenda but maintain public support.

The main ideals of conservative democracy are best identified when they are compared to the Islamist ideology advocated by the AKP's preceding parties. A substantial contrast between the two exist, for example, on their position regarding the European Union, Israel, the United States, economic policy, and to a lesser extent social policy.

== Political development ==
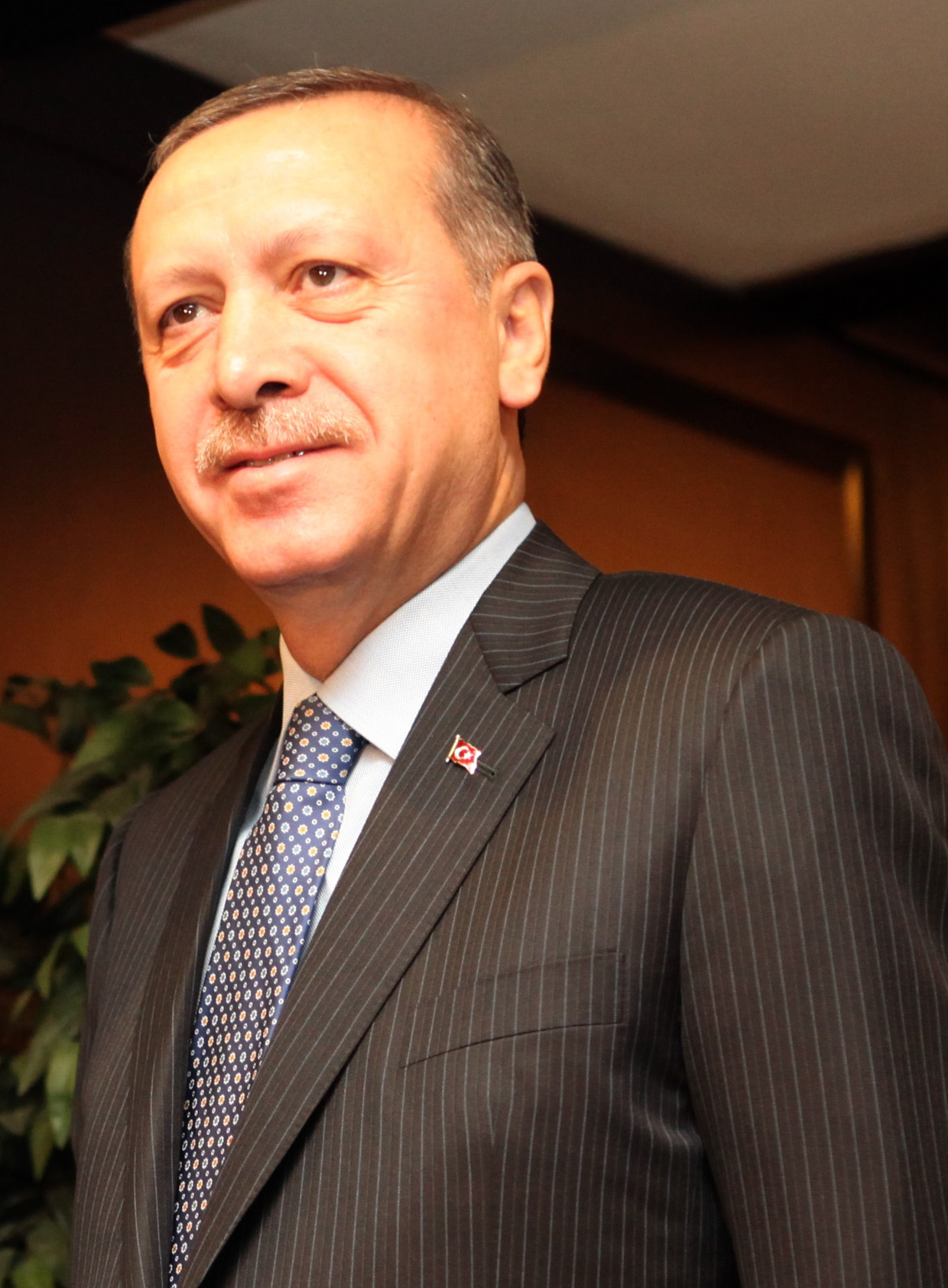
Turkish President Recep Tayyip Erdoğan, who coined the term 'conservative democracy'

The AKP was formed in 2001 after moderate politicians abandoned the Islamist Virtue Party in order to establish a modernist political party instead. These included the former Mayor of Istanbul, Recep Tayyip Erdoğan and Kayseri MP Abdullah Gül. Earning the support of many members from the Virtue Party, the AKP also took away much of the support from other centre-right economically liberal parties such as the True Path Party and the Motherland Party in the 2002 general election. The party has thus been described as a "broad right-wing coalition of Islamists, reformist Islamists, conservatives, nationalists, centre-right, and pro-business groups.

Since secularism is enshrined in the constitution of Turkey, various openly Islamist political parties, such as the National Order Party, the National Salvation Party, the Welfare Party and eventually the Virtue Party were closed down by the Constitutional Court for anti-secular activities. That contributed to the subsequent abandonment of an openly Islamist ideology in favour of a reformed, pro-secular conservative democratic ideal that would be accepted by the state. A closure case against the AKP in 2008 on the grounds that the party violated secularism thereby failed, but the party was stripped of 50% of its state funding.

=== Hidden agenda ===
The term 'conservative democracy' has seldom been defined by AKP politicians. The party's origins from Islamist organisations has raised speculation as to whether the party in fact harbours a hidden Islamist political agenda and uses the term 'conservative democracy' to conceal such intentions. Members of the opposition Republican People's Party (CHP) and opposition journalists have put forward the view that the party has gradually brought about Islamist-oriented social changes, such as limiting alcohol consumption as well as beginning a crackdown against mixed-sex student accommodation in late 2013. Other reforms, such as the lifting of the headscarf ban in the civil service, have been labelled as human rights issues by supporters and as open attacks on secularism by rivals.

A substantial rise in electoral fraud allegations during the AKP government, most prevalently during the 2014 local elections, as well as numerous government corruption scandals, has raised speculation that the AKP harbours not an Islamist but an authoritarian hidden agenda, which aims to a gradual eliminatation of democratic checks and balances. Judicial reforms by the government in 2014 that were criticised as an attempt to politicise the courts, a heavy-handed police crackdown following anti-government protests in 2013 and increasing media censorship have also furthered that claim.

== Values ==
Former minister Hüseyin Çelik claimed the AKP's conservative democracy as being limited to social and moral issues, rejecting the 'moderate Islam' and the 'Muslim democrat' labels, which have been used to describe the party. Although politicians who have identified themselves as conservative democrats have usually endorsed secularism, disputes have long remained between them and hardline laicists, who advocate a ban on religious activities in the public sphere.

== Gradualism ==
=== Alcohol ===
The high tax on the alcoholic beverages, called special consumption tax (Turkish: Özel Tüketim Vergisi ÖTV), established first in 2002 and dramatically increased in 2010 by the government of Justice and Development Party (AKP), whose leadership is known for their aversion to alcohol, led to a significant rise in smuggling and fraud involving the alcoholic beverages in the country. Bootlegging is blamed for the 2011 Turkish Riviera mass alcohol poisoning.

In 2013, new laws banned all forms of advertising and promotion for alcoholic beverages, including "promotions, sponsored activities, festivals and free giveaways." Beverage companies ran ads criticising the ban.

In 2013 the government passed laws limiting retail licenses from 10 pm to 6 am and banning "student dormitories, health institutions, sports clubs, all sorts of education institutions and gas stations" from selling alcohol. 185,000 kiosks with alcohol licenses could be affected.

The law also included a requirement to blur depictions of alcoholic beverages on television and in films, as was already done for cigarettes, and for bottles to carry health warnings similar to tobacco packaging warning messages.

=== Headscarf ===
In 2013, the headscarf ban in public institutions was lifted through a decree, even though the ban officially stands through court decisions. The ban on wearing hijab in high schools was lifted in 2014.

=== Evolution in schools ===
In 2017, the Turkish Education Ministry announced the removal of evolution from the secondary school curriculum.

=== Adultery ===
In 2018, Recep Tayyip Erdoğan said that Turkey should again consider criminalizing adultery and that Turkey made a mistake by not criminalizing adultery to join EU in 2004.

== Criticism ==
Besides the accusations of being a red herring, the term 'conservative democracy' has come under fire from a founding AKP politician, Ertuğrul Yalçınbayır, who claimed that the AKP's party programme was not initially written on a conservative democratic basis but instead focussed simply on protecting democracy. He argued that by identifying itself as conservative democrat, the AKP has pressured the electorate into endorsing conservative values, which has been detrimental to social unity and freedom of thought. He argued that the term 'conservative democrat' was, in fact, coined by Deputy Prime Minister Yalçın Akdoğan, in a book entitled 'AK Party and Conservative Democracy' in 2004. Yalçınbayır also claimed that disagreements over the term contributed to another Deputy Prime Minister Abdüllatif Şener leaving the AKP and establish the Turkey Party in 2009.

== See also ==
- Christian democracy – Christian socioeconomic model
- Conservatism in Turkey
  - Erdoğanism – Conservative ideology of Recep Tayyip Erdoğan
- Democratic globalization – Social movement towards global democracy
- Guided democracy – Democratic governments acting as autocracies
- Illiberal democracy – System of governance
- Liberal democracy – Form of government
- Popular democracy – Notion of direct democracy
- Sovereign democracy – Term describing modern Russian politics
