= Erdoğanism =

Conservative ideology of Recep Tayyip Erdoğan

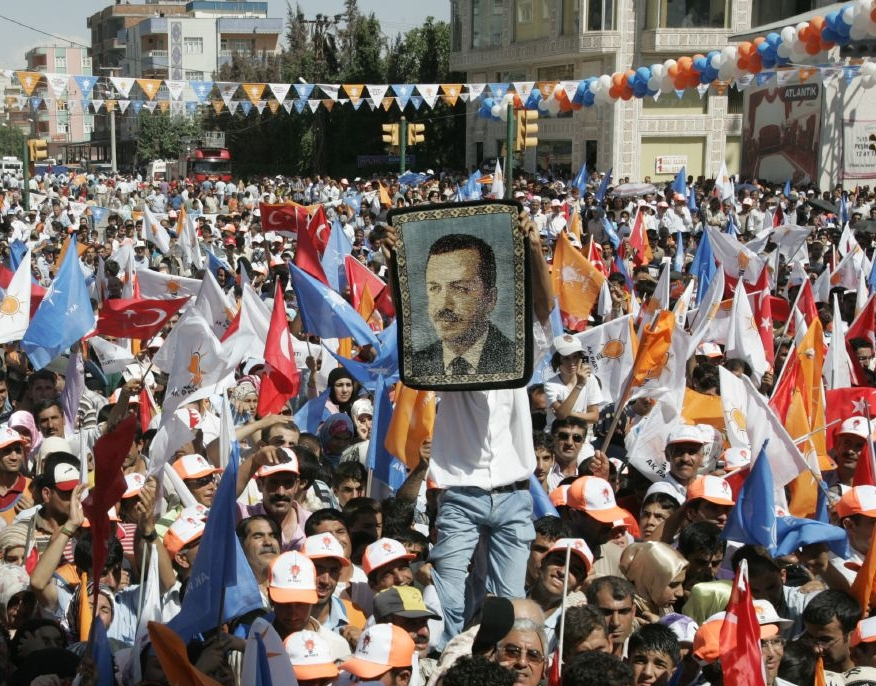
A wall rug of Erdoğan, whose ideals and political agenda have come to be referred to as "Erdoğanism", at a rally of the Justice and Development Party

Erdoğanism (Turkish: Erdoğancılık) refers to the political ideals and agenda of Turkish president and former prime minister, Recep Tayyip Erdoğan, who became prime minister in 2003 and served until his election to the Presidency in 2014. With support significantly derived from charismatic authority, Erdoğanism has been described as the "strongest phenomenon in Turkey since Kemalism" and used to enjoy broad support throughout the country until the 2018 Turkish economic crisis which caused a significant decline in Erdoğan's popularity.

Its ideological roots originate from Turkish conservatism and its most predominant political adherent is the governing Justice and Development Party (AK Parti), a party that Erdoğan himself founded in 2001. It is seen by some as a Third Way ideology.

== Overview ==
Key ideals of Erdoğanism include a religious inspired strong centralised leadership based primarily on electoral consent and less so on the separation of powers and institutional checks and balances. Critics have often referred to Erdoğan's political outlook as authoritarian and as an elective dictatorship. The election-centric outlook of Erdoğanism has often been described as an illiberal democracy by foreign leaders, such as Hungarian Prime Minister Viktor Orbán.

Erdoğanism is also strongly influenced by the desire to establish a 'New Turkey', departing from the founding Kemalist principles of the Turkish Republic and abolishing key enshrined constitutional ideals that are at odds with Erdoğan's vision, such as secularism. Supporters of Erdoğanism often call for a revival of cultural and traditional values from the Ottoman Empire and are critical of the pro-western social reforms and modernisation initiated by the founder of the Turkish Republic, Mustafa Kemal Atatürk. Grassroots support for Erdoğanism mainly originates from the development of a cult of personality around Erdoğan, as well as the predominance of charismatic authority. The role of Erdoğan personified as an individual agent of Turkish conservative values has manifested itself in the form of prominent campaign slogans for the Turkish Presidential election such as "Man of the nation", translated in Turkish as "Milletin Adamı".

== History ==
The term 'Erdoğanism' first emerged shortly after Erdoğan's 2011 general election victory, where it was predominantly described as the AK Party's conservative democratic ideals fused with Erdoğan demagoguery and cult of personality. The usage of the term increased in conjunction with a greater recognition of Erdoğan on the global stage, mostly due to his proactive foreign policy ideals based on Neo-Ottomanism, a core factor that Erdoğanism encompasses.

== Core values ==
Mustafa Akyol has conceived Erdoğanism as an ideology fundamentally based on a cult of personality around Erdoğan, referring to it as a form of populist authoritarianism similar to that of Putinism in Russia. Akyol also describes the glorification of the Ottoman Empire, Islamism, suspicion of Western political intervention in the Middle East, the rejection of Kemalism, and confinement of the democratic process and elections as key attributes of Erdoğanism. For other scholars the anti-Kemalist political direction is equaled with anti-Westernism.

=== Conflict with Islamism ===
Though elements of Erdoğanism, particularly the political rhetoric used by its supporters, have been inspired from Islamism, the extensive cult of personality surrounding Erdoğan has been argued to have isolated hardline Islamists who are sceptical of his dominance in state policy. The central and overarching authority of Erdoğan, a central theme of Erdoğanism, has been criticised by Islamists who believe that devotion of followers should not be towards a leader, but rather to Allah and the teachings of Islam. As such, the overarching dominance of Erdoğan has furthered Islamist criticism, particularly by Islamist parties such as the Felicity Party (SP), who have claimed that Erdoğanism is not based on Islamism but is instead based on authoritarianism using religious rhetoric to maintain public support amongst the conservative base of the electorate.

== See also ==
- Anti-Erdoğanism
- Conservatism in Turkey
- Conspiracy theories in Turkey
- Euroscepticism
- Islamokemalism
- Pan-Islamism

=== Similar ideologies ===
- Ecevitism
- İttihadism
- Kemalism
- Bolsonarism
- Dutertismo
- Fujimorism
- Orbanism
- Pinochetism
- Putinism
- Trumpism
