= Ertuğrul Özkök =

Turkish journalist and a daily columnist

- Born: 8 April 1947 (age 79); İzmir, Turkey
- Occupation: Journalist

Ertuğrul Özkök (born 8 April 1947) is a Turkish journalist and a daily columnist. Between 1990 and 2010, he was the editor-in-chief for Hürriyet, a daily newspaper published in Turkish in Turkey and some European countries. Özkök is known for advocating modernization of Turkey, globalization, women's rights and Turkey's European Union accession. He is also known for his strong relationships with Turkey's and Europe's top politicians, journalists and business people.

== Early life ==
Özkök was born in İzmir a few years after his parents had to migrate to Istanbul. Both his father, who had made a name as a prominent printer of İzmir, and his mother are from Kardzhali, Bulgaria. He graduated from İzmir Namık Kemal Lisesi and did his university studies in Paris, France.

== Political views and public perception ==
In September 2010 Özkök said that "I believe in God but I am not religious." (Turkish: Ben Allah’a inanan bir insanım, ama dindar değilim.) He also identifies himself as a White Turk, a sociological group he has been describing.

He was against the wearing of the Islamic headscarf by Merve Kavakçı in the Parliament of Turkey, stating in a 1999 article titled Ecevit o gece neleri kurtardı (What Ecevit Saved that Night), "Ecevit is like that head of parliament who stood against the soldiers who overran the Parliament of Spain. He stood up in front of an ideology that overran Parliament. History will write what was prevented in Turkey by that speech that night, and what a historical importance Ecevit's scolding speech there carried. The lessons Ms. Merve received from those little students at school, when she went to pick her kids, are the first signs of the process of letting her know her limits."
