= Islamokemalism =

Ideology fusing Kemalism and Islamism

Islamokemalism (Turkish: İslamokemalizm, İslamcı Atatürkçülük, Atatürkçü İslamcılık), also known as Green Kemalism (Yeşil Kemalizm) is a Turkish-Islamic synthesist ideology based on Kemalism, which either advocates for the society to be religious while keeping the state and its politics secular, or a complete replacement of secularism with Islamism in politics as well. It can also refer to religious Turks who support Mustafa Kemal Atatürk and the Republic of Turkey.

== History ==
The origin of Islamokemalism traced back to the post-World War II period, when Turkish politicians such as Adnan Menderes and Turgut Özal began reintegrating religion into public life without entirely rejecting Kemalism. Ömer Çaha stated that the "softening of the rigid secularism of early Kemalism opened the door to conservative interpretations of Turkish identity that retained loyalty to the Republic and its institutions."

Mustafa Akyol described Islamokemalism as an attempt by Islamist politicians to "reclaim Atatürk" while reshaping his image to align with religious and nationalist values.

Binnaz Toprak also noted that Islamokemalists often preserved the core Kemalist tenets of nationalism and statism, while softening or rejecting militant secularism and Westernization.

Critics of Islamokemalism claimed that the ideology represented authoritarian nationalism where religion served state interests rather than spiritual values. Cihan Tuğal viewed Islamokemalism as a form of "passive revolution" where Islam was made to serve nationalist statism, creating a hegemonic project. Moreover, traditional Kemalists also criticized Islamokemalism, claiming that it was a betrayal of Atatürk, while Islamists criticized Islamokemalism for its nationalism and loyalty to the state. Georgios Karabelias claimed that neo-Ottomanism was the integration and expansion of Islamokemalism in the field of foreign affairs.

Turkish Islamists who quarrelled with their Jamaats were forced to renew their alliance, and they had decided to fight the Jamaats with the support of the Turkish state, when it was staunchly Kemalist and when the Turkish army was filled with Kemalists and Idealists who were angered by the Jamaats, and the Vatan Party and MHP became the new allies of these Islamists. There were common grounds of Islamism and Kemalism which made Kemalism appealing to Islamists, and vice versa, such as political parties merging and creating new ideologies. Islamokemalism grew during the period of Tunçer Kılınç. Many Turks who also love the Ottoman Empire, as well as the Republic, are drawn to the ideology. Hasan Âli Yücel was a known Islamokemalist ideologue. While Islamists vilify Atatürk due to his role in the abolition of the caliphate, Islamokemalists view him as a leader who did what was necessary to ensure the freedom of his nation and believe that the Ottoman Empire and the Republic of Turkey can be both supported at the same time. It is a very popular ideology in Turkey. It is commonly associated with the centre-right, right-wing, and far-right of Turkish politics.

Islamokemalism was the ideology of the 1980 Turkish coup d'état, and the state ideology of Turkey for a short time after the coup.

Although not all Islamokemalists support Recep Tayyip Erdoğan, Islamokemalism grew under Erdoğan, who bridged the gap between Islamists and nationalists by fusing both ideologies, and embracing the Ottoman past while admiring Mustafa Kemal Atatürk.

Nesrine Malik in 2018 likened "the Islamo-Kemalism of Erdoğan" to the "so-called 'Christian-Democracy' of Viktor Orbán's Hungary, widespread support of Donald Trump by white evangelicals in the United States, the Hindu nationalism of Modi" in their propensity to generate "evidence to support the view that religion and populism are bad enough in themselves and even worse when combined".
