= Sorgun =

Sorgun is a Turkish place name and may refer to:

- Sorgun, Güdül, a neighbourhood in Güdül district of Ankara Province, Turkey
- Sorgun, Erdemli, a neighbourhood in Erdemli district of Mersin Province, Turkey
- Sorgun, Yozgat, a city in Yozgat Province, Turkey
- Sorgun District, a district in Yozgat Province, Turkey

== See also ==
- Sorgun Dam, a dam in Isparta Province, Turkey
- Sorgun coal mine, a lignite mine in Turkey
