= Sorgun coal mine =

Coal mine in Turkey

Sorgun Coal Mine or Sorgun Lignite Field Mine is one of the largest coal mines in Turkey.
