= White Turks =

Social group of Turkey

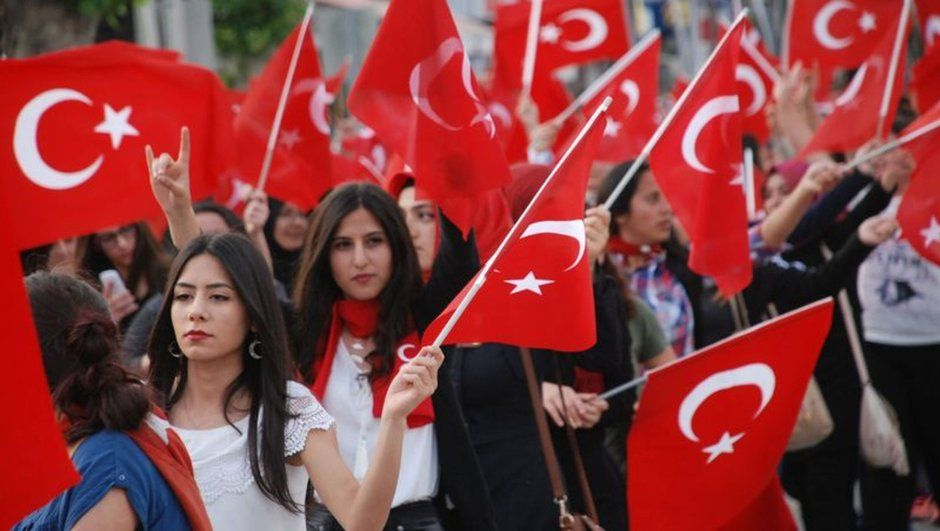
White Turks at a rally with the Turkish flag.

White Turks (Turkish: Beyaz Türkler) is a term used in Turkey for the urban population that embraced or directly benefited from Turkey’s modernization. They are often generalized as embracing values such as secularism, Western enlightenment, positivism and republicanism. White Turks are in contrast to the so-called Black Turks, a name for the conservative, Islamic, and typically less privileged among the originally rural Anatolian population. The two terms are related to the emergence of a middle class since the end of the 20th century, and is an expression of elite consciousness and also a contempt for a section of the population which is seen as backwards. Civilizing efforts had been part of the imagination of all Turkish elites since the Tanzimat reforms.

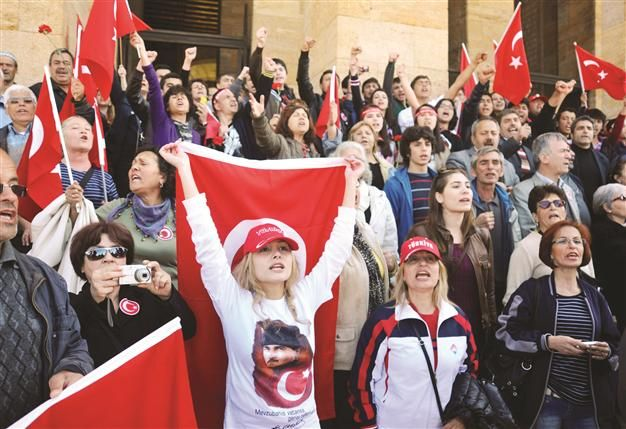
White Turks at the grave of Mustafa Kemal Atatürk, the founder of the Turkish Republic

Anand Giridharadas describes the dichotomy between white and black Turks as "an extraordinary culture war over what it means to be a Turk":

The battle — waged in national politics but also in life’s daily minutiae — has become, literally, black and white. In one corner are “white Turks,” who revere the republic’s founder, Kemal Atatürk, and his mission to remake Turkey in Europe’s image — secular, republican, purged of its Ottoman legacies. In the other corner are “black Turks,” conservative Muslims who, in a mostly Muslim nation, were marginalized for decades, excluded from the Turkish elite — until, in 2003, one of their own became a populist prime minister and began what many black Turks consider a healthy rebalancing and many white Turks, the politics of resentment or, worse, revenge.

Recep Tayyip Erdoğan often describes himself as a black Turk. The term was also used by 2018 presidential candidate Muharrem İnce to describe himself, claiming that Erdoğan was no longer a black Turk.

In an ironic approach to the conceptual pair, Mümin Sekman wrote in his book "Türk Usulü Başarı" that, among other things, black Turks listen to Arabesque and folk music, while white Turks prefer Western music and Turkish pop; black Turks have arranged marriages, while white Turks choose their own partners; white Turks meet at airports, while black Turks use bus terminals.

Ertuğrul Özkök of Hürriyet considers himself a white Turk and generalizes the group as follows:

They live mainly in coastal regions, are sensitive when it comes to secularism, they drink alcohol, have a high purchasing power, a Western lifestyle and the women do not wear hijabs.

He also stated in 2014 that under the current rule of the AKP, white Turks have become the new oppressed group in Turkey after Kurds and Alevis, and that the increasingly marginalized white Turks must "learn to fight by defending their lifestyles".

== Origins ==
These terms are believed to have originally been coined by the late journalist Ufuk Güldemir in his 1992 book "Teksas Malatya". The term "white Turks" was meant to be analogous to the American WASP, and was used to describe an old elite who opposed the then-Prime Minister Turgut Özal because of his Kurdish origin, religiousness and lack of military service. The term was subsequently taken up by sociologist Nilüfer Göle and popularized by Turkish columnists, journalists and political scientists who used it to refer to various social groups in Turkey.

== Grey Turks ==
Some observers, such as Ayşe Sözen and Nilüfer Narlı, also note the emergence of a third group of "Grey Turks", who are urbanized, well-educated and enjoy Western music and films, but are pious Muslims. Some use the term to refer to the aspiring black Turks that climbed the socio-economic ladder during the Turgut Özal era and gained momentum during the AKP's current rule.

== See also ==
- Erdoğanism
- Qara bodun
- Secularism in Turkey
- Conservatism in Turkey
- Kemalism
- Islam in Turkey
- Mustafa Kemal Atatürk's cult of personality
- Freedom of religion in Turkey
- Brown Sahib
