= Conservatism in Turkey =

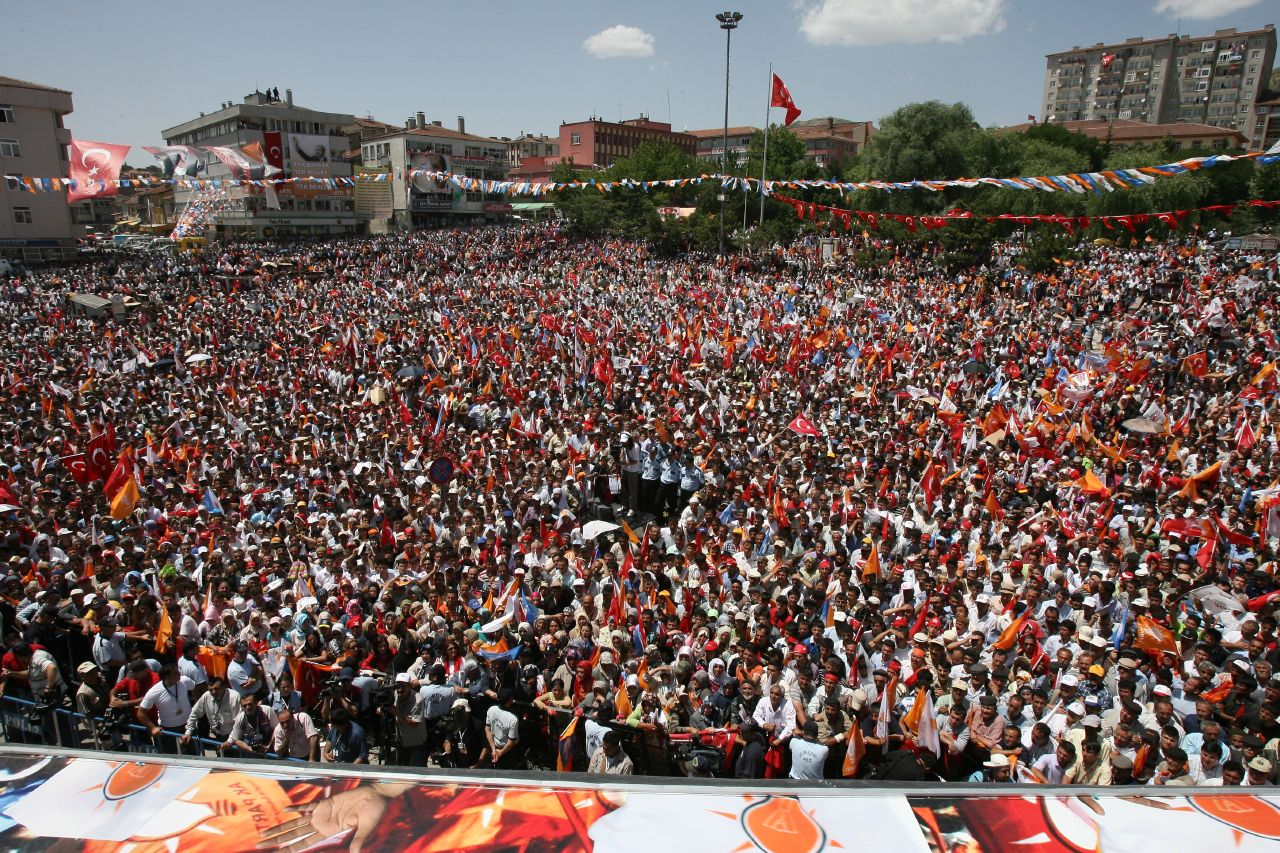
A rally of the Justice and Development Party, known as a conservative party, 2007

Conservatism in Turkey (Turkish: Muhafazakârlık) is a national variant of conservatism throughout Turkey reflected in the agendas of many of the country's political parties, most notably the governing Justice and Development Party (AK Party), which describes its prevailing ideology as conservative democracy. Elements of Turkish conservatism are also reflected in most parties situated on the political right, including the Nationalist Movement Party (MHP). In Turkey, it is often referred to as Türk tipi muhafazakârlık (Turkish-style conservatism).

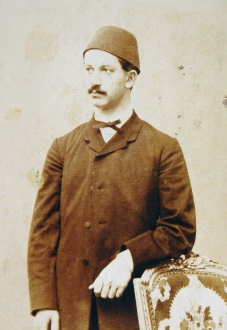
Ahmed Kemaleddin, notable follower of Turkish conservatism

Turkish conservatism is distinct from conservatism in other countries in that it is predominantly at odds with the established state structure, tending to be critical of the founding principles of the Turkish Republic whereas most forms of conservatism elsewhere tend to endorse the principle values of the state. Ideals predominantly at odds with conservatives, such as secularism, statism, populism, and the existence of a social state are enshrined within the Constitution of Turkey. Turkish conservatism is rivalled mainly by Kemalism, based on the ideology of Turkey's founding president Mustafa Kemal Atatürk, who brought about several social reforms influenced by a progressive pro-western agenda following the collapse of the conservative Ottoman Empire. However, Kemalism has also been described by some as a form of conservative nationalism as it endorses and safeguards the established traditions of the Turkish state, which also includes Islam as part of the state identity.

Conservatism in Turkey tends to be inspired and strongly influenced by political Islam, with conservative values arising from local orders, Islamic tarikats, and village traditions. Turkish conservatism therefore tends to be more socially conservative, religious, and in favour of strong centralised leadership, therefore often being characterised as authoritarian by critics. Turkish conservatives also tend to show greater approval to the return of Ottoman culture as opposed to the Western-inspired culture and values originating from the Republic era.

Recent surveys continuously show that conservatism in Turkey enjoys strong political support, predominantly in the central Anatolia region and rural areas where village and local traditions remain strictly enforced. In 2012, only 8.6% of Turks described themselves as entirely non-conservative as opposed to 12.6% in 2006. Research by Kadir Has University showed that 39.2% of Turks described themselves as conservative in 2013, falling to 20.7% describing themselves as conservatives in 2015.

== List of conservative political parties in Turkey ==
=== Current ===
- Justice and Development Party
- Nationalist Movement Party
- Great Unity Party
- Felicity Party
- Good Party
- Democrat Party
- Future Party
- Democracy and Progress Party
- Motherland Party
- True Path Party
- Nation Party
- Homeland Party
- Free Cause Party
- New Welfare Party

=== Major historical parties ===
- Democrat Party
- Justice Party
- National Salvation Party
- True Path Party
- Motherland Party
- Welfare Party
- Virtue Party

== See also ==
- Conspiracy theories in Turkey
- Intellectuals' Hearth
- Islamokemalism
- White Turks
- Black Turks
- Freedom of religion in Turkey
- Xenophobia and discrimination in Turkey
- Minorities in Turkey
- Human rights in Turkey
