= Secularism in Turkey =

In Turkey, secularism or laicism (see laïcité) was first introduced with the 1928 amendment of the Constitution of 1924, which removed the provision declaring that the "Religion of the State is Islam", and with the later reforms of Turkey's first president Mustafa Kemal Atatürk, which set the administrative and political requirements to create a modern, democratic, secular state, aligned with Kemalism.

Nine years after its introduction, laïcité was explicitly stated in the second article of the then Turkish constitution on 5 February 1937. The current Constitution of 1982 neither recognizes an official religion nor promotes any.

The principles of Turkish secularism, and the separation of state and religion, were historically established in order to modernize the nation. This centralized progressive approach was seen as necessary not only for the operation of the Turkish government but also to avoid a cultural life dominated by superstition, dogma, and ignorance.

Turkey's concept of laiklik ("laicism") calls for the separation of state and religion, but also describes the state's stance as one of "active neutrality", which involves state control and legal regulation of religion. Turkey's actions related with religion are carefully analyzed and evaluated through the Presidency of Religious Affairs (Diyanet İşleri Başkanlığı or simply Diyanet). The duties of the Presidency of Religious Affairs are "to execute the works concerning the beliefs, worship, and ethics of Islam, enlighten the public about their religion, and administer the sacred worshipping places".

== History ==
The history of secularism in Turkey extends to the Tanzimat reforms of Ottoman Empire. The second peak in secularism occurred during the Second Constitutional Era. The current form was achieved by Atatürk's Reforms.

=== Ottoman Empire ===
The establishing structure (Ruling institution of the Ottoman Empire) of the Ottoman Empire (13th century) was an Islamic state in which the head of the Ottoman state was the Sultan. The social system was organized around millet. Millet structure allowed a great degree of religious, cultural and ethnic continuity to non-Muslim populations across the subdivisions of the Ottoman Empire and at the same time it permitted their incorporation into the Ottoman administrative, economic and political system. The Ottoman-appointed governor collected taxes and provided security, while the local religious or cultural matters were left to the regional communities to decide. On the other hand, the sultans were Muslims and the laws that bound them were based on the Sharia, the body of Islamic law, as well as various cultural customs. The Sultan, beginning in 1517, was also a caliph, the leader of all the Sunni Muslims in the world. By the turn of the 19th century the Ottoman ruling elite recognized the need to restructure the legislative, military and judiciary systems to cope with their new political rivals in Europe. When the millet system started to lose its efficiency due to the rise of nationalism within its borders, the Ottoman Empire explored new ways of governing its territory composed of diverse populations.

Sultan Selim III founded the first secular military schools by establishing the new military unit, Nizam-ı Cedid, as early as 1792. However the last century (19th century) of the Ottoman Empire had many far reaching reforms. These reforms peaked with the Tanzimat which was the initial reform era of the Ottoman Empire. After the Tanzimat, rules, such as those relating to the equalized status of non-Muslim citizens, the establishment of a parliament, the abandonment of medieval punishments for apostasy, as well as the codification of the constitution of the empire and the rights of Ottoman subjects were established. The First World War brought about the fall of the Ottoman Empire and the subsequent partitioning of the Ottoman Empire by the victorious Allies.

=== Republic ===
==== Atatürk's reforms ====
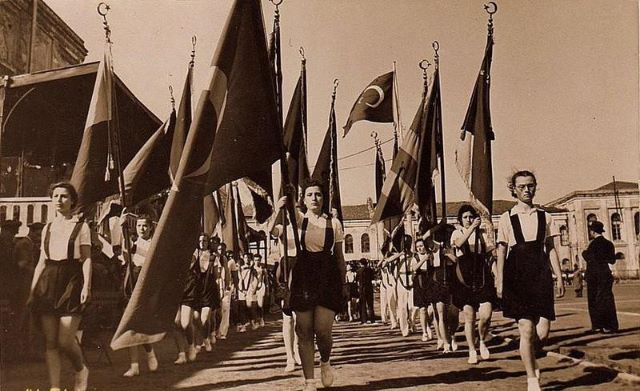
One-party period was marked with sweeping reforms for women

Reforms and policies designed to modernize Turkey adopted by Kemal Atatürk (1881–1938), the founder and the first president of Republic of Turkey, were known as "Kemalism", and had "six principles: republicanism, nationalism, populism, secularism, revolutionism and statism". Unlike some "softer" forms of secularism, Kemalist secularism "did not mean the separation of religion only from the state, rather it meant the separation of religion from whole public spheres—politics, jurisprudence, education, society and so on".

Kemalism excluded "religious symbols from public domain" and put religion "under the strict control of the state". The weekly holiday was changed from Friday to Sunday, the calendar changed from the Muslim lunar to Gregorian, and the alphabet changed from Arabic to Latin.

During the establishment of the Republic, there were two sections of the elite group at the helm of the discussions for the future. These were the Islamist reformists and Westerners. They shared a similar goal, the modernization of the new state. Many basic goals were common to both groups. The founder of the modern Turkish Republic Mustafa Kemal Atatürk's achievement was to amplify this common ground and put the country on a fast track of reforms, now known as Atatürk's reforms.

Their first act was to give the Turkish nation the right to exercise popular sovereignty via representative democracy. Prior to declaring the new Republic, the Turkish Grand National Assembly abolished the constitutional monarchy on 1 November 1922. The Turkish Grand National Assembly then moved to replace the extant Islamic law structure with the laws it had passed during the Turkish War of Independence, beginning in 1919. The modernization of the Law had already begun at the point that the project was undertaken in earnest. A milestone in this process was the passage of the Turkish Constitution of 1921. Upon the establishment of the Republic on 29 October 1923, the institution of the caliphate (a title held by the Ottoman Sultanate since 1517) remained, but the passage of a new constitution in 1924 effectively abolished this title. Even as the new constitution eliminated the caliphate it, at the same time, declared Islam as the official religion of the Turkish Republic. According to the law text passed by the Turkish Parliament, "Since the Caliphate was essentially present in the meaning and concept of the Government and the Republic, the office of the Caliphate was abolished."

Following quickly upon these developments, a number of social reforms were undertaken. Many of these reforms affected every aspect of Turkish life, moving to erase the legacy of dominance long held by religion and tradition. The unification of education, installation of a secular education system, and the closure of many religious orders took place on 3 March 1924. This extended to closure of religious convents and dervish lodges on 30 November 1925. These reforms also included the extension to women of voting rights in 1931 and the right be to elected to public office on 5 December 1934. The inclusion of reference to laïcité into the constitution was achieved by an amendment on 5 February 1937, a move regarded as the final act in the project of instituting complete separation between governmental and religious affairs in Turkey.

==== Perceived Islamization under the AKP ====
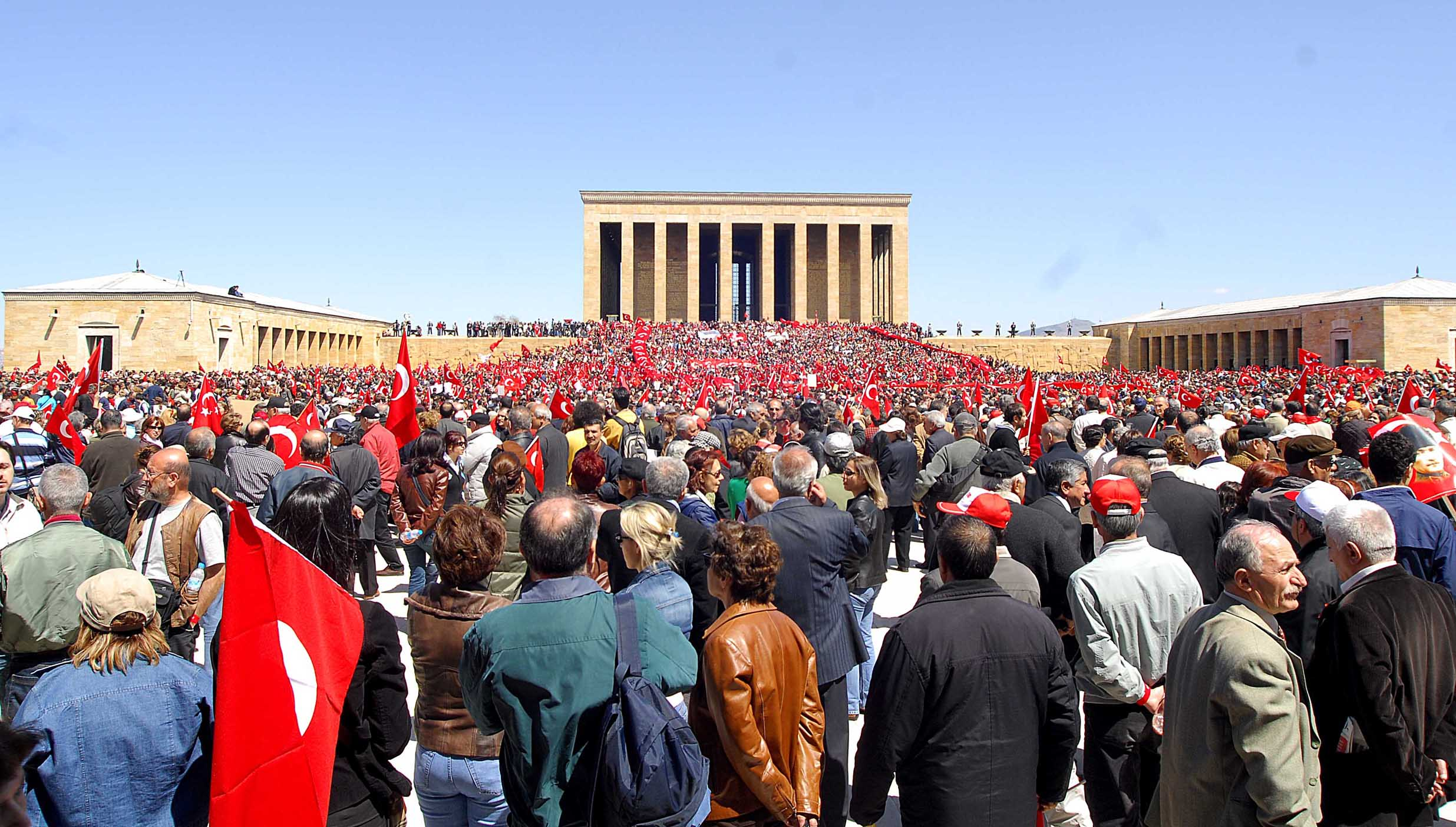
The Republic Protests took place in 2007 in support of the Kemalist ethos, avowing state secularism, against the perceived Islamization of Turkey under the ruling Justice and Development Party.

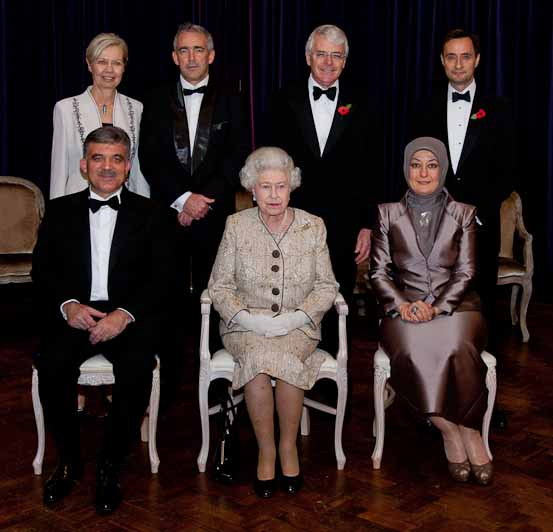
Hayrünnisa Gül, the wife of Abdullah Gül, became the first hijabi first lady in Turkish history

According to at least one observer (Mustafa Akyol), under the Justice and Development Party (AKP) government of Recep Tayyip Erdoğan, "hundreds of secularist officers and their civilian allies" were jailed starting in 2007, and by 2012 the "old secularist guard" were removed from positions of authority and replaced by members/supporters of the AKP and the Islamist Gülen movement. On 25 April 2016, the Turkish Parliament Speaker İsmail Kahraman told a conference of Islamic scholars and writers in Istanbul that "secularism would not have a place in a new constitution", as Turkey is "a Muslim country and so we should have a religious constitution". (One of the duties of Parliament Speaker is to pen a new draft constitution for Turkey.)

Traditionally, the function of the Diyanet was to maintain control over and limit the religious sphere of Islam in Turkey. Some (David Lepeska, Svante Cornell) have complained that under Erdoğan that role has "largely been turned on its head", with the Diyanet, now greatly increased in size, promoting Islam in Turkey, specifically a certain type of conservative Islam—issuing fatawa forbidding such activities as "feeding dogs at home, celebrating the western New Year, lotteries, and tattoos"; and projecting this "Turkish Islam" abroad.

In education, the AKP government pursued the explicit policy agenda of Islamization to "raise a devout generation" against secular resistance, in the process causing many non-religious citizens of Turkey to lose their jobs and schooling. The turn to a more conservative and Islamic policy by the AKP, according to scholars such as M. Yavuz arises from the aftermath of the AKP's victory in the 2007 Turkish national elections. Due to the AKP's strong religious leanings and the centrality of political secularism in the state of Turkey, the AKP was charged with anti-secularism and had its funding cut by the Turkish constitutional court. Subsequently, this had led the AKP and through its collaboration with the Gülen movement to prosecute individuals who they had associated with their prosecution by the constitutional court in what Yavuz describes as "kangaroo courts". From there, it is arguably seen that the AKP with the Gülen movement, had begun to reshape state institutions and promoted Islamic-centric parties and individuals with the Gülen movement up till the 2016 Turkish coup attempt.

Following the July 2016 coup attempt—which President Erdoğan called "a gift from God"—thousands were purged by the AKP government. The victims were primarily followers of the Gülen movement — which is alleged to have launched the coup—but also secularists who had not already been sacked in earlier purges. One explanation for the replacement of secularist policies in Turkey is that business interests who felt threatened by socialism saw Islamic values as "best suited to neutralize any challenges from the left to capitalist supremacy."

Some (such as Turan Kayaoğlu) see interest and support of secularism in Turkey as strengthening, not decreasing. After Erdoğan stated his desire to "raise a religious youth," politicians of all parties condemned his statements as abandoning Turkish values. A petition reading "[O]f Muslim, Christian, Jewish, Zoroastrian, Alawite, Shafi’i, religious and nonreligious, atheist and agnostic backgrounds, all joined with a firm belief in secularism, [we] find your recent remarks about raising a religious and conservative youth most alarming and dangerous" was signed by over 2,000 people. The pro-government newspaper Bugün ran a story stating "no one has the right to convert this society into a religious one, or the opposite." Surveys of the Turkish people also show a great support for maintaining a secular country. The Turkish Economic and Social Studies Foundation found that only 9% of Turks supported a religious state in 2006. A 2015 poll by Metropoll found that over 80% of Turkish people supported the continuation of Turkey as a secular state, with even the majority of AKP voters supporting a secular state too.

== Constitutional principles ==
The Constitution asserts that Turkey is supposed to be a secular and democratic republic, deriving its sovereignty from the people. The sovereignty rests with the Turkish Nation, who delegates its exercise to an elected unicameral parliament, the Turkish Grand National Assembly. Moreover, Article 4 declares the immovability of the founding principles of the Republic defined in the first three Articles:

1. "secularism, social equality, equality before the law"
2. "the Republican form of government"
3. "the indivisibility of the Republic and of the Turkish Nation",

The Constitution bans any proposals for the modification of these articles (see Entrenched clause). Each of these concepts which were distributed in the three articles of the constitution can not be achieved without the other two concepts. The constitution requires a central administration which would lose its meaning (effectiveness, coverage, etc.) if the system is not based on laïcité, social equality, and equality before law. Vice versa, if the Republic differentiate itself based on social, religious differences, administration can not be equal to the population when the administration is central. The system which tried to be established in the constitution sets out to found a unitary nation-state based on the principles of secular democracy.

=== Headscarf controversy ===
Do you cover when going outside?
	1999	2012
No, I do not	47.3%	66.5%
Yes, I wear a headscarf	33.4%	18.8%
Yes, I wear a türban	15.7%	11.4%
Yes, I wear a çarşaf	3.4%	0.1%
NI/NA	0.3%	2.2%

The Turkish government had outlawed the wearing of headscarves by women who work in the public sector in 1982. The ban had applied to teachers, lawyers, parliamentarians and others working on state premises. The ban on headscarves in the civil service and educational and political institutions was expanded to cover non-state institutions. Authorities began to enforce the headscarf ban among mothers accompanying their children to school events or public swimming pools, while female lawyers and journalists who refused to comply with the ban were expelled from public buildings such as courtrooms and universities. In 1999, the ban on headscarves in the public sphere hit the headlines when Merve Kavakçı, a newly elected MP for the Virtue Party was prevented from taking her oath in the National Assembly because she wore a headscarf. The constitutional rule that prohibits discrimination on religious grounds is taken very seriously. Turkey prohibited by law the wearing of religious headcover and theo-political symbolic garments for both genders in government buildings, schools, and universities; a law that was upheld by the Grand Chamber of the European Court of Human Rights as legitimate on 10 November 2005, in Leyla Şahin v. Turkey. In 2022, President Recep Tayyip Erdoğan has suggested the constitutional change to guarantee the right to wear a headscarf in the civil service, schools, and universities should be decided through a referendum.

== Impact on society ==
The Turkish Constitution recognizes freedom of religion for individuals whereas identified religious communities are placed under the protection of state. The constitution explicitly states that it is illegal for a religious community to get involved in politics, or to form a Party openly representing a religious group.

In recent history, two parties have been ordered to close (Welfare Party in 1998, and Virtue Party in 2001) by the Constitutional Court for Islamist activities and attempts to "redefine the secular nature of the republic". The first party to be closed for suspected anti-secularist activities was the Progressive Republican Party on 3 June 1925.

Issues relating to Turkey's secularism were discussed in the lead up to the 2007 presidential election, in which the ruling party chose a candidate with Islamist connections, Abdullah Gül, for the first time in the history of the secular republic. While some in Turkey have expressed concern that the nomination could represent a move away from Turkey's secularist traditions, including particularly Turkey's priority on equality between the sexes, others have suggested that the conservative party has effectively promoted modernization while reaching out to more traditional and religious elements in Turkish society. On 22 July 2007, it was reported that the more religiously conservative ruling party won a larger than expected electoral victory in the snap general election.

Turkey's preservation and maintenance of its secular identity has been a profound issue and source of tension. Prime Minister Recep Tayyip Erdoğan has broken with secular tradition, by speaking out in favor of limited Islamism and against the active restrictions, instituted by Atatürk on wearing the Islamic-style head scarves in government offices and schools. The Republic Protests (Turkish: Cumhuriyet Mitingleri) were a series of peaceful mass rallies that took place in the spring of 2007 in support of the Kemalist ideals of state secularism.

In Turkey, wearing headscarves in government buildings and schools was prohibited. The law was upheld by the Grand Chamber of the European Court of Human Rights as legitimate on 10 November 2005, in Leyla Şahin v. Turkey. They held that government "encouragement of secularism" was a legitiamate state policy.

The strict application of secularism in Turkey has been credited for enabling women to have access to greater opportunities, compared to countries with a greater influence of religion in public affairs, in matters of education, employment, wealth as well as political, social and cultural freedoms.

Also paradoxical with the Turkish secularism is the fact that identity document cards of Turkish citizens include the specification of the card holder's religion. This declaration was perceived by some as representing a form of the state's surveillance over its citizens' religious choices.

The mainstream Hanafite school of Sunni Islam is entirely organized by the state, through the Diyanet İşleri Başkanlığı (Religious Affairs Directorate), which supervises all mosques, educates the imams who work in them, and approves all content for religious services and prayers. It appoints imams, who are classified as civil servants. This micromanagement of Sunni religious practices, at times, seems much more sectarian than secular, as it violates the principle of state neutrality in religious practice. Groups that have expressed dissatisfaction with this situation include a variety of non-governmental Sunni / Hanafi groups (such as the Nurcu movement), whose interpretation of Islam tends to be more activist; and the non-Sunni (Alevi), whose members tend to resent supporting the Sunni establishment with their tax money (whereas the Turkish state does not subsidize Alevi religious activities).

== See also ==
- Freedom of religion in Turkey
- Conservatism in Turkey
- Headscarf controversy in Turkey
- Islam in Turkey
- Religion in Turkey
- White Turks
- Black Turks
- Political polarization in Turkey
