= Black Turks =

Socioeconomic classification of people in Turkey

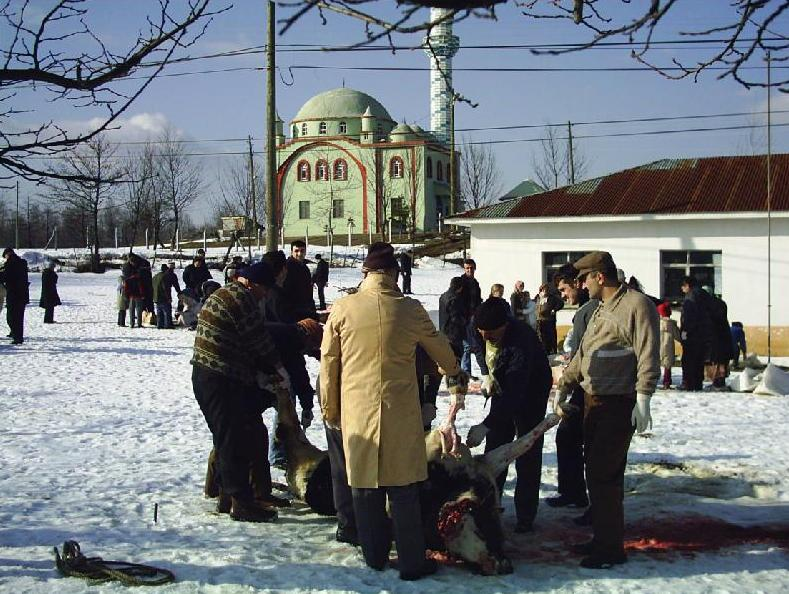
Black Turks celebrate religious holiday "Kurban Bayramı" (Eid al-Adha) in Gölköy, 2005

Black Turks (Turkish: Kara Türkler Siyah Türkler) is a socioeconomic term used to describe Turks who are a lower or middle income class. They are described as religious and traditional in contrast to the more secularized class of their country.

The contrasting socioeconomic group in Turkey is called the White Turks, who dominate the society's politics; their efforts to restrict the religious lifestyle have led to cultural conflict.

A third class of Turks with characteristics of both classes is known as the Grey Turks.

The term Black Turk was used by 2018 presidential candidate Muharrem İnce to describe himself, claiming that President Recep Tayyip Erdoğan was no longer a Black Turk.

== See also ==
- Religion in Turkey
- Islam in Turkey
- Erdoğanism
- Freedom of religion in Turkey
- Conservatism in Turkey
