= Mustafa Akyol =

Turkish writer, intellectual, and journalist (born 1972)

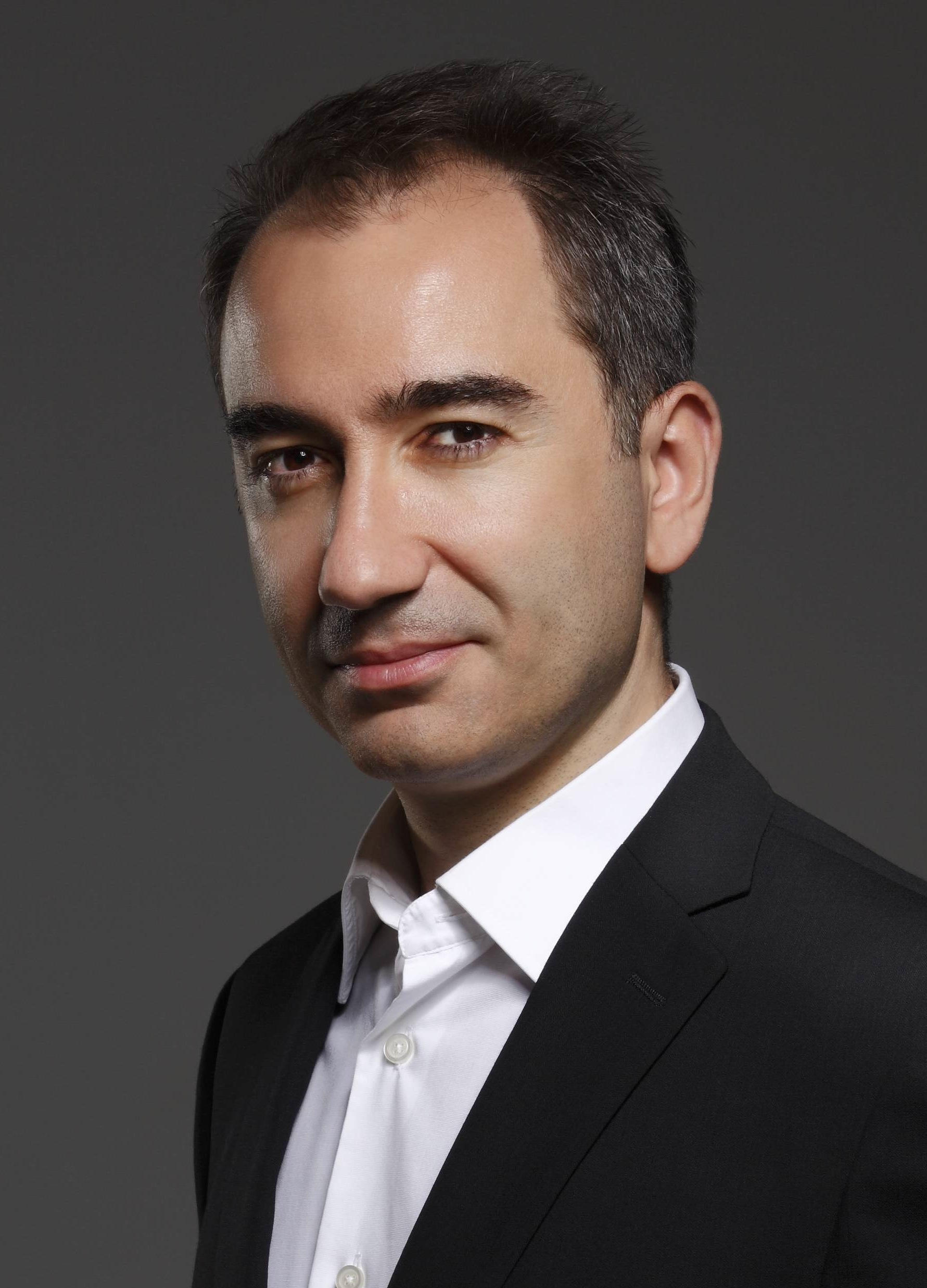
- Akyol in 2013
- Born: 20 February 1972 (age 54); Turkey
- Occupations: Writer, journalist
- Website: mustafaakyol.org

Mustafa Akyol (born 20 February 1972) is a Turkish writer, intellectual, and journalist. Notable for his advocacy on reform on blasphemy, apostasy and gender relations in the Muslim world, he has been called “probably the most notable Muslim modernist and reformer”.

== Career ==
Akyol has written regular columns for Turkish dailies like Hürriyet Daily News. He has criticized both Islamic extremism and Turkish secularism, which he likened to Jacobinism and fundamentalism.

Akyol's earlier articles in Turkish newspapers were often friendly to the incumbent Justice and Development Party (AKP). In later commentary in a U.S. newspaper, he criticised the party's governance as having "adopted the very authoritarian habits it used to oppose" and thus having "failed as a model of liberal Islamism."

He also spoke at TED, giving a lecture on "Faith versus tradition in Islam".

Akyol is also author of the English-language book Islam Without Extremes: A Muslim Case For Liberty (W.W. Norton), an argument for religious freedom in the Muslim world.

Since 2018, Akyol has been a senior fellow at the Cato Institute, a libertarian think tank. He is also an affiliate scholar at the Acton Institute.

Akyol used to be an outspoken promoter of intelligent design and was identified as a former spokesman for Science Research Foundation (Bilim Araştırma Vakfı), an Islamic creationist group, started by Adnan Oktar. Akyol later noted that he had ended all his "cooperation with [Bilim Araştırma Vakfı]... due to some serious disagreements on issues other than intelligent design." He was also affiliated with the Discovery Institute. Akyol has testified in the Kansas evolution hearings in favor of introducing intelligent design and arranged a government-sponsored intelligent design conference in Istanbul. In 2019, he said he changed his mind, noting that "the theory of evolution is perfectly compatible with the faith."

== Arrest and censorship ==
In September 2017, he was detained for 18 hours in Malaysia following a talk on the commonalities between the Abrahamic religions by Malaysia's Federal Territory Islamic Affairs Department (JAWI), for allegedly teaching religion without getting authorization from the government. His book Islam Without Extremes was subsequently banned by the Home Ministry for being "not suitable to the societal norms".

== Criticism ==
Akyol has been described as a "fiercely pro-AKP" voice by fellow Turkish journalists.

Stephen Schwartz criticizes Akyol's lack of full disclosure regarding his own family's Turkish history and involvement in politics in Islam Without Extremes. He also faults Akyol for not carefully laying out the facts surrounding Turkish democracy, and rushing to conclusions about the country's AKP political party that are not fully supported by the evidence.

== Works ==
- Akyol, Mustafa (2005). Rethinking The Kurdish Question: What Went Wrong? What Next?. Dogan Publishing.
- Akyol, Mustafa (2011). Islam Without Extremes (1st ed.). W.W. Norton & Company. ISBN 978-0-393-07086-6.
- Akyol, Mustafa (2017). The Islamic Jesus: How the King of the Jews Became a Prophet of the Muslims. St. Martin's Press.
- Akyol, Mustafa (2021). Reopening Muslim Minds: A Return to Reason, Freedom, and Tolerance. St. Martin's Press.
- Akyol, Mustafa (2021). Why, As A Muslim, I Defend Liberty. Cato Institute.
