= Çarşaf =

Islamic female over-garment

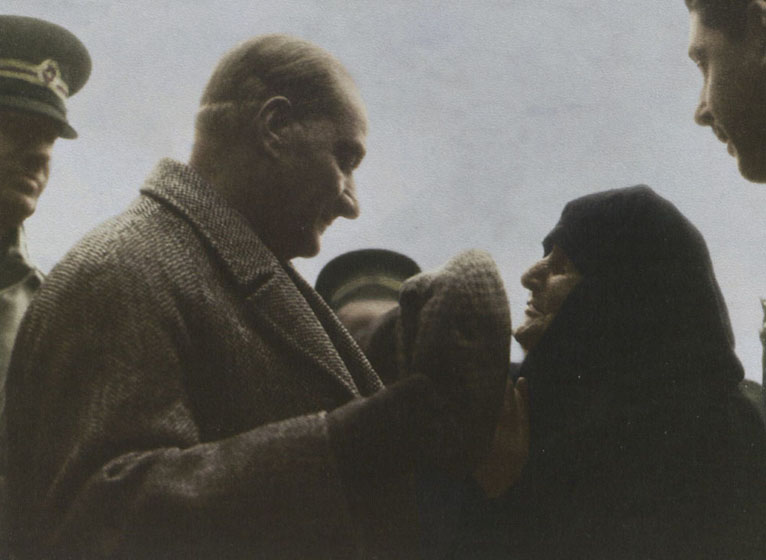
Atatürk and an old woman in çarşaf

A çarşaf (Ottoman Turkish: چارشاف), commonly transliterated to English as charshaf, is a simple, loose over-garment, essentially a robe-like dress, similar to the abaya and chador; see also niqab head-cover and burqa (body and face cover).

The çarşaf is usually black. As with the Iranian chador, the çarşaf usually covers the lower part of the face, and the cloth is held together by a pin placed below the nose. Sometimes, the part of the cloth that covers the lower face is pinned laterally. In contrast to the chador, the çarşaf usually consists of two parts; a top that hangs to about the waist and a bottom that is cut like a wide, floor-length skirt.

The çarşaf, rather than being a form of traditional Islamic clothing, first became common towards the end of the 19th century, during the reign of Abdulhamid II (1876–1908), as a form of rejection of Western influences (see First Constitutional Era). From then, it continued to be used prevalently in remote parts of the former Ottoman Empire such as Yemen, where it is still widespread today.

According to research from 2012 (N/I, N/A 6%), less than 2% of women wore it in Turkey and 5% in Iraq. According to another survey, only 0.1% of Turkish women wore the çarşaf in 2012.

However, it is used for prayer by women, similar to the use of the mukena in Muslim Southeast Asia.

In modern Turkish, çarşaf mainly means 'sheet', 'linen', 'bed lining' etc.

== See also ==
- Għonnella
- Burqa
- Chador
- Hijab
