= Leyla Şahin v Turkey =

2004 European Court of Human Rights case

Leyla Şahin v. Turkey was a 2004 European Court of Human Rights case brought against Turkey by a medical student challenging a Turkish law which bans wearing the Islamic headscarf at universities and other educational and state institutions. The Court upheld the Turkish law by 16 votes to 1.

Şahin (born in Istanbul in 1973) came from a traditional family of practising Muslims and considered it her religious duty to wear the Islamic headscarf. After studying in Vienna, in 1998 she was a fifth-year student at the faculty of medicine of the University of Istanbul. On 23 February of that year the Vice-Chancellor of the University issued a circular directing that students with beards and students wearing the Islamic headscarf would be refused admission to lectures, courses and tutorials. In March Şahin was denied access to a written examination on one of the subjects she was studying because she was wearing the Islamic headscarf. Subsequently, the university authorities refused, on the same grounds, to allow her to enrol her in a course, or to admit her to various lectures and a written examination. The university also issued her with a warning for contravening the university's rules on dress and suspended her from the university for a term for taking part in an unauthorised assembly that had gathered to protest against them. All the disciplinary penalties imposed on the applicant were revoked under an amnesty law.

Before the European Court of Human Rights Şahin claimed that the measures taken against her by the University of Istanbul violated Articles 9 and 14 of the European Convention on Human Rights – respectively the right to freedom of thought, conscience and religion, and the prohibition of discrimination – stating that the prohibition on wearing the headscarf forced students to choose between education and religion and discriminated between believers and non-believers. She also relied on Articles 8 (the right to privacy) and 10 (freedom of expression).

In November 2015, Leyla Şahin became a member of Parliament in Turkey for the conservative AKP party.

== Article 9 ECHR interpretation ==
Talvikki Hoopes argues that the decision to uphold the Turkish university's law banning Leyla Sahin from wearing a headscarf is informed by the ECHR’s narrow interpretation of Article 9 of the European Convention on Human Rights. The first paragraph provides that "Everyone has the right to freedom of thought, conscience, and religion ... to manifest his religion or belief, in worship, teaching, practice and observance." The second paragraph subjects the freedom to manifest one's religion or beliefs to "limitations prescribed by law and necessary in a democratic society for the protection of the rights and freedoms of others".

The ECHR understood "prescription by law" to mean law in the substantive sense and therefore inclusive of both written statutes, measures and "regulatory measures taken by professional regulatory bodies" with delegated powers from the government. Hence, the circular detailing the ban on headscarves provided to students by the Vice-Chancellor of Istanbul University, was determined to be "prescribed law", the ECHR having referenced a 1989 Turkish Constitutional judgment that mentioned headscarves in higher education as "contrary to the principles of secularism ... and first and foremost contrary to the Constitution". The ECHR then addressed whether the law was "necessary in a democratic society" and determined that the "choice of the extent and form" of religious regulations should remain primarily within the powers of the state. Since Turkey desired to promote secularism, the ECHR held that if Turkey determined the banning of headscarves necessary, it would not rule against the abrogation of Leyal Sahin's religious right. Talvikki Hoopes summarizes the narrowed interpretation of Article 9 paragraph 2 as follows: "the right to manifest one's religious beliefs can be abrogated as long as your government has outlawed that right and they are doing so for appropriate purposes, as determined by the government itself."
