= Freedom of religion in Turkey =

External videos
- Turkey: Religious freedom vs nationalism -BBC

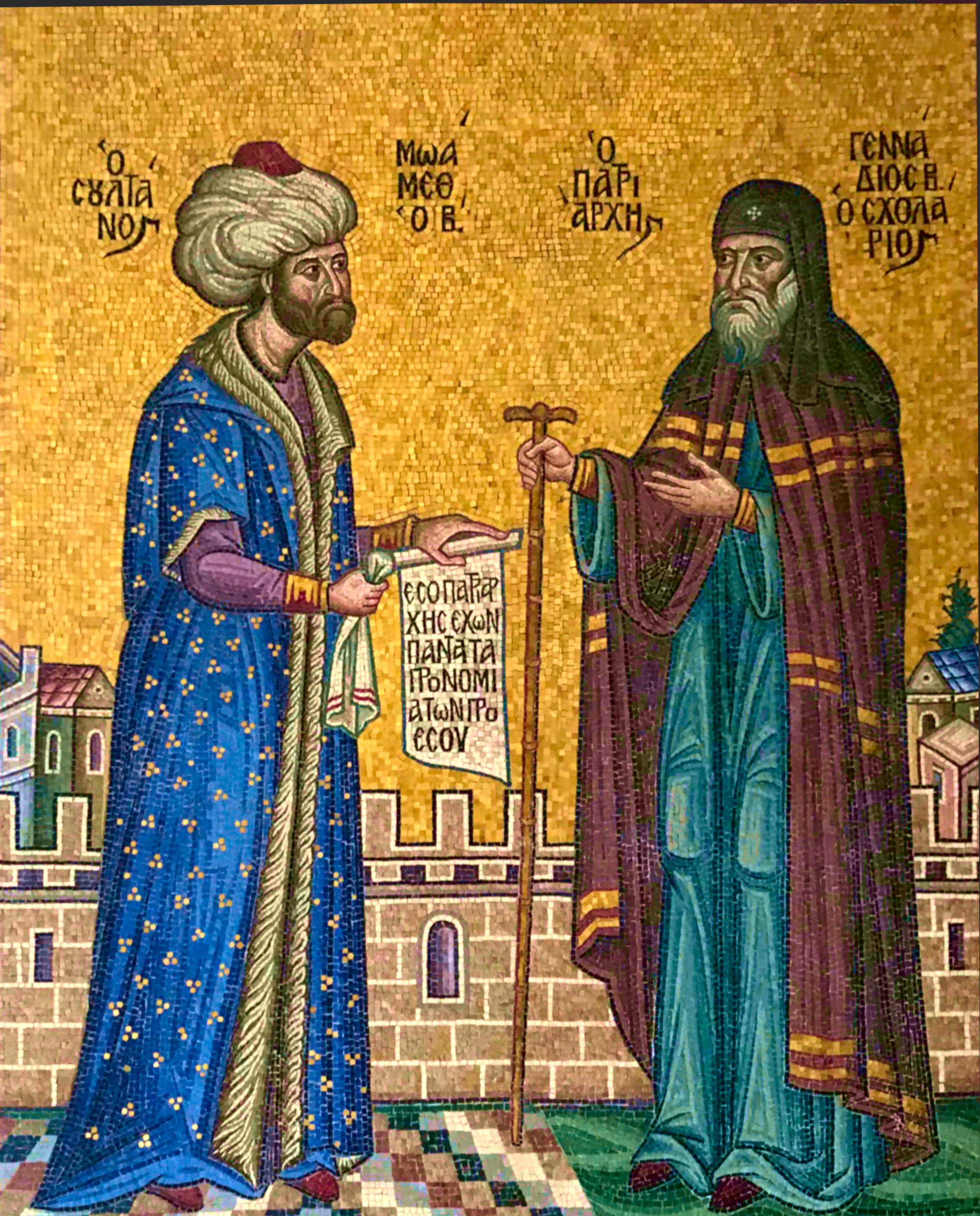
Ottoman Mehmed the Conqueror and Greek Orthodox Patriarch Gennadios II. Mehmed II allowed the Ecumenical Patriarchate of Constantinople to remain active in the city after its conquest by the Ottoman Turks in 1453 and established the Armenian Patriarchate of Constantinople in 1461 as part of the millet system. The Byzantines regarded the Armenian Church as heretical and forbade it inside the Walls of Constantinople.

Turkey is a secular state in accordance with Article 24 of its constitution. Secularism in Turkey derives from Mustafa Kemal Atatürk's Six Arrows: republicanism, populism, laïcité, reformism, nationalism and statism. The Turkish government imposes some restrictions on Muslims and other religious groups, as well as Muslim religious expression in government offices and state-run institutions, including universities.

Religion in Turkey (Optimar survey, 2019)
1. Islam (89.5%)
2. Irreligion (Deism) (4.50%)
3. Irreligion (Agnosticism) (2.70%)
4. Irreligion (Atheism) (1.70%)
5. Other Religions (Christianity, Baháʼí Faith, Judaism, Tengrism, Yazidism) (0.50%)
6. Unanswered (1.70%)

In 2023, the country was scored 2 out of 4 for religious freedom; land disputes for religious buildings are a large source of tension.

== Religious demography ==
According to the Turkish government, 99% of the population is Muslim (predominantly Sunni). The World Factbook lists 99.8 percent of Turkey's population as Muslim. The government recognizes three minority religious communities: Greek Orthodox Christians, Armenian Apostolic Christians and Jews (although other non-Muslim communities exist). The 2006 report of the U.S. Department of State enumerated the following religious minorities in Turkey:

Armenian Apostolic Christians	65,000
Jews	23,000
Greek Orthodox Christians	6,500
Baha'is	10,000
Syrian Orthodox (Syriac) Christians	15,000
Yazidis	5,000
Jehovah's Witnesses	3,300
Protestants	3,000

These figures were largely repeated in the 2009 U.S. Department of State report with a difference of up to 3,000 Greek Orthodox Christians with an additional 3,000 Chaldean Catholics. The number of Syriac Christians and Yazidis in the southeast was once high; however, due to government pressure and the war with the Kurdistan Workers' Party (PKK), many Syriac Christians migrated to Istanbul, Western Europe and North and South America in the early 2000's. According to Turkish sociologist Ahmet Taşğın, Yazidis in Turkey numbered 22,632 in 1985; by 2000, the population had dropped to 423. Taşğın said that 23,546 Syriac Christians lived in Turkey in 1985 and 2,010 in 2001.

As a signatory of the 1923 Treaty of Lausanne, Turkey recognizes the civil, political and cultural rights of non-Muslim minorities. In practice, the country recognizes Greek, Armenian and Jewish religious minorities but does not grant them all the rights stipulated in the treaty. Alevi-Bektashi and Câferî Muslims Latin Catholics, and Protestants are not officially recognized.

Religions in Turkey
Religions	Estimated population	Expropriation measures	Official recognition	Government financing
Sunni Islam	70 to 85% (52 to 64 million)	No	Yes, through the Diyanet mentioned in the Constitution (Article 136)	Yes, through the Diyanet
Twelver Islam-Bektashi	15 to 25% (11 to 19 million)	Yes	No. In 1826, with the abolition of the Janissary corps, the Bektashi tekke (Dervish convent) was closed.	No
Twelver Islam-Alevi	15 to 25% (11 to 19 million)	Yes	No. In the early 15th century, due to Ottoman oppression, Alevi supported the Turkmen shah Ismail I. Ismail's supporters, who wear a red cap with twelve folds, were called Qizilbash.Ottomans considered Qizilbash (Alevi) enemies because of their supposed heresy. Today, cemevi (places of worship of Alevi) have no official recognition.	No
Twelver Islam-Câferî	4% (3 million)		No	No
Twelver Islam-Alawite	300,000 to 350,000		No	No
Judaism	20,000	Yes	Yes, through the Treaty of Lausanne (1923)	No
Christian (Protestant)	5,000		No	No
Christian (Roman Catholics)	25,000		No	No
Christian (Greek Catholics)		Yes	Yes, through the Treaty of Lausanne (1923)	No
Greek Orthodox (Ecumenical Patriarchate of Constantinople)	203,500	Yes	Yes, through the Treaty of Lausanne (1923)	No
Armenian Orthodox (Armenian Patriarchate of Constantinople)	90,000	Yes	Yes, through the Treaty of Lausanne (1923)	No
Turkish Orthodox (Autocephalous Turkish Orthodox Patriarchate)	400		No	No
Chaldean (Armenian) Christians	3,000	Yes	Yes, through the Treaty of Lausanne	No
Syriac Orthodox and Catholic Churches	15,000	Yes	No	No
Tengrism	1,000		No	No
Yazidi	377		No	No

== Status of religious freedom ==
=== Legal and policy frameworks ===
The 1928 constitution established the country as a secular state and provides for freedom of belief and worship and the private dissemination of religious ideas. However, other constitutional provisions for the integrity of the secular state restrict these rights. The constitution prohibits discrimination on religious grounds.

The two main Islamic streams in Turkey are Sunni and Alevi. Alevi are the minority in Turkey, estimated at 17 percent of the Muslim population. During the late 1970s, violent clashes occurred due to conflict between these two Islamic branches. In December 1978 militants in Kahramanmaraş agitated the Sunni population against the Alevi inhabitants of the town, and more than 100 people were killed. On 2 July 1993, Alevi intellectuals were attacked in Sivas; the Sivas massacre resulted in the deaths of 37 people.

Religious education is compulsory at the primary and secondary levels, according to Article 24 of the constitution, and Sunni theology predominates. A number of Alevis alleged discrimination in the government's failure to include their doctrines and beliefs in religious courses. In October 2007, the European Court of Human Rights (ECHR) ruled in favor of an Alevi parent who filed suit in 2004 claiming that the mandatory religious courses violated religious freedom. The government then added a 10-page overview of Aleviism to the textbook for the final year of religious instruction.

In December 2008, the Minister of Culture participated in the opening of the first Alevi Institute and apologised to the Alevis for past sufferings caused by the state. In January 2009, the Prime Minister attended an Alevi fast-breaking ceremony for the second consecutive year. The government held workshops aimed at openly discussing Alevi problems and expectations.

The Turkish government oversees Muslim religious facilities and education through its Directorate of Religious Affairs, under the authority of the Prime Minister. The directorate regulates the operation of the country's 77,777 registered mosques and employs local and provincial imams (who are civil servants). Sunni imams are appointed and paid by the state. The Alevis pray in cemevleri (gathering places), which have no legal status as places of worship. However, the Kuşadası and Tunceli municipalities ruled in 2008 that Alevi cemevleri are places of worship. Three municipal councils recognised cemevleri as places of worship, granting them the same financial advantages as mosques. Administrative courts in Antalya, Ankara and Istanbul ruled that Alevi students should be exempted from attending the mandatory religion and ethics course, and a similar ruling by the Izmir administrative court was confirmed by the Council of State. In 2009 the state TV channel, TRT, announced its plan to air programs reflecting the interests of the Alevi minority.

In the early 2000s, a separate government agency, the General Directorate for Foundations (GDF), regulated activities of non-Muslim religious groups and their affiliated churches, monasteries, synagogues and related religious property. The GDF recognized 161 "minority foundations", including Greek Orthodox foundations with about 61 sites, Armenian Orthodox foundations with about 50 sites, and Jewish foundations with 20 sites and Syriac Christian, Chaldean, Bulgarian Orthodox, Georgian and Maronite foundations. They also regulated Muslim charitable religious foundations, including schools, hospitals and orphanages, assessing whether they are operating within their stated objectives.

In 1936, the government required all foundations to declare their sources of income. In 1974, amid political tensions over Cyprus, the High Court of Appeals ruled that minority foundations had no right to acquire properties beyond those listed in the 1936 declarations. The court ruling introduced a process in which the state seized control of properties acquired after 1936.

Minority religious groups, particularly the Greek and Armenian Orthodox communities, have lost a number of properties to the state in the past. In many cases, the government has expropriated property on the grounds that it is not being utilized. At least two appeals were filed in this regard: the Fener Boys School and the Buyukada Orphanage (the latter closed in 1964). These cases are often appealed to the Council of State (Danıştay) and, if unsuccessful there, to the European Court of Human Rights (ECHR). On July 8, 2008, the ECHR ruled that Turkey had violated the Ecumenical Patriarchate's property rights to the orphanage on Büyükada. In compliance with this ruling, the deed to the building was returned to the ecumenical patriarchate on November 29, 2010.

The law restricting religious property rights was amended in 2002 to allow minority foundations to acquire property, but the government continued to apply an article allowing it to expropriate properties in areas where the local non-Muslim population drops significantly or where the foundation is deemed to no longer perform the function for which it was created. There is no specific minimum threshold for such a population drop, which is left to the discretion of the GDF. This is problematic for small populations (such as the Greek Orthodox community), since they maintain more properties than the local community needs; many are historic or significant to the Orthodox world.

Greek Orthodox, Armenian Orthodox and Jewish religious groups may operate schools under the supervision of the Education Ministry. The curricula of the schools include information unique to the cultures of the groups. The Ministry reportedly verifies if the child's father or mother is from that minority community before the child may enroll. Other non-Muslim minorities do not have schools of their own.

The Caferis, the country's principal Shi'a community (between 500,000 and 1,000,000, concentrated in eastern Turkey and Istanbul), do not face restrictions on their religious freedom. They build and operate their own mosques and appoint their own imams; however, as with the Alevis, by 2009 their places of worship had no legal status and received no support from the Diyanet.

Churches operating in Turkey generally face administrative challenges to employ foreign church personnel, apart from the Catholic Church and congregations linked to the diplomatic community. These administrative challenges, restrictions on training religious leaders and difficulty obtaining visas have led to a decrease in the number of Christian clergy. In 2022, it was noted that between 60-100 Christian missionaries had been deported.

=== Restrictions on religious freedom ===
In 2022, the Jehovah’s Witnesses annual report noted that while they have relative freedom of worship, the government did not recognize conscientious objection to military service and has alternative civilian service. In the past, members have been arrested for evading military service; in 2022, a court annulled a fine for “evasion of military service” on one member and acquitted another member.

Article 219 of the penal code prohibits imams, priests, rabbis and other religious leaders from "reproaching or vilifying" the government or the laws of the state while performing their duties. Violations are punishable by imprisonment of from one month to one year, or three months to two years if others are incited to disobey the law.

In 2022, the Ecumenical Patriarchate in Istanbul continued its efforts to reopen the Halki seminary on the island of Heybeli in the Sea of Marmara. The seminary was closed in 1971 when the patriarchate, to avoid the seminary's administration by the state, refused a government demand to nationalize.

The Syriac Orthodox Mor Gevargis Church in Mardin, which had been closed since 1915, reopened in June 2022 after being closed for 107 years; a new Syriac Orthodox church has also been built in Istanbul.

According to Turkey's country report from the U.S. Department of State for 2022, there were no reports of religious prisoners or detainees.

==== Headscarves ====
In 2007, authorities continued enforcing a ban dated 1982 on the wearing of headscarves by students at universities and by civil servants in public buildings. The Constitutional Court has interpreted secularism as not permitting a person to wear religious symbols (such as headscarves or crosses) in government and public institutions, such as public schools and state universities. According to a 5 June 2008 ruling, parliament violated the constitutional principle of secularism when it passed amendments (supported by the AKP and the MHP) to lift the headscarf ban on university campuses.

In its November 10, 2005 decision on Leyla Şahin v. Turkey, the Grand Chamber of the European Court of Human Rights ruled that the ban was "legitimate" to prevent the influence of religion in state affairs. However, Human Rights Watch supported "lifting the current restrictions on headscarves in university on the grounds that the prohibition is an unwarranted infringement on the right to religious practice. Moreover, this restriction of dress, which only applies to women, is discriminatory and violates their right to education, freedom of thought, conscience, religion, and privacy".

Changes in the law saw the ban on headscarves eliminated in some government buildings including parliament, the police forces and the military by 2017.

==== ID cards ====
Religious affiliation is listed on national identity cards, despite Article 24 of the 1982 constitution which forbids the compulsory disclosure of religious affiliation. Members of some religious groups, such as the Bahá'í, are unable to state their religious affiliation on their cards because it is not included among the options; they have made their concerns known to the government. Despite a 2006 regulation allowing people to leave the religion section of their identity cards blank or change their religious affiliation by written application, the government continued to restrict applicant choice of religion; applicants had to choose Muslim, Greek Orthodox, Christian, Jew, Hindu, Zoroastrian, Confucian, Taoist, Buddhist, Religionless, Other or Unknown as their religious affiliation.

By 2022, the government was issuing chip-enabled national identity cards that show no visible identification of religious background.

==== Education ====
Religious and moral instruction is compulsory in public and private schools after third grade; the curriculum is set by the Ministry of National Education’s Department of Religious Instruction. Religion classes are two hours per week. Students who have 'Christian' or 'Jewish' marked on their national identity cards can apply for an exemption; others are rarely granted exemptions from the classes. Middle and high school students may take additional religious courses as electives.

=== Abuses of religious freedom ===
In October 2006 a prosecutor pressed criminal charges against Hakan Taştan and Turan Topal (Muslim converts to Christianity) for violating Article 301 ("insulting Turkishness"), inciting hatred against Islam and compiling data on private citizens for a Bible correspondence course. If convicted, the men could be sentenced to six months to three years in prison. On the basis of reports that the defendants were approaching grade- and high-school students in Silivri and attempting to convert them to Christianity, police searched one man's home, went to the men's office and confiscated two computers, books and papers. The three plaintiffs said that the Christians called Islam a "primitive and fabricated religion" and the Turks a "cursed people". The accused denied all charges. In March 2009 they were found guilty of "illegal collection of funds", regarding receiving church offerings without government permission; in October 2010, they were found not guilty of "offending Turkishness".

After the 18 April 2007 killing of three Christians in Malatya, Turkish victim Uğur Yüksel was denied a Christian burial and received an Islamic Alevi burial. Turkish victim Necati Aydın was buried in a Protestant churchyard in Izmir. The governor of Malatya was initially hesitant to permit the burial of the German victim in Malatya, telling his widow that no Christian should be buried in Turkish soil. After negotiations between German and Turkish government officials, the victim was buried in a private Armenian cemetery in Malatya.

On 28 May 2009, court proceedings continued in the 2006 case against two Muslim converts to Christianity charged with "insulting Turkishness" in violation of Article 301 of the penal code, inciting hatred of Islam and secretly compiling data on private citizens for a Bible correspondence course. The court called five witnesses to appear at the next hearing, set for 15 October 2009. During the hearing, some witnesses testified that they did not know the defendants. The court in Silivri adjourned the hearing until 28 January 2010 to hear three more witnesses.

In 2014, members of the Turkish parliament were prevented from accessing the website of Diyarbakır Church (cited as "pornography"), and other Protestant church websites were also blocked. The real reason for the blocks was believed to be anti-Christian sentiment.

In 2022, several people attacked six Alevi institutions and cemevis in Ankara; this was investigated as terrorism. In the same year, a Jewish cemetery was vandalised and anti-Semitic statements were circulated on social media and on national television.

== Societal abuses and discrimination ==
In the early 2000s, societal abuses or discrimination based on religious belief or practice were reported, with religious pluralism widely viewed as a threat to Islam and "national unity". A few non-Sunni Muslims, Christians, Bahá'ís and members of other religious communities faced suspicion and mistrust. Anti-missionary and anti-Christian rhetoric by government officials and national media, such as Hürriyet and Milliyet, appears to have continued. Government ministers such as Mehmet Aydın, Minister of State in charge of religious affairs, called missionaries "separatist and destructive".

Religiously-motivated attacks on people were reported. Best known are the 2007 assassination of Armenian journalist Hrant Dink in Istanbul on 19 January and the killings of three Christians in Malatya on 18 April. Details on religiously-motivated attacks on persons can be found in the annual reports of the U.S. Department of State for 2007, 2008 and 2009.

=== 2016: The failure of the coup and the Gülen movement ===
The government was held responsible for the July 15 coup attempt for the exiled Muslim cleric Fethullah Gülen and his movement, which the government considered a terrorist organization. After a coup attempt, the government detained more than 75,000 government officials and fired 3,600 staff from Diyanet because of alleged links to Gülen and a coup attempt.

=== 2017: Post-failure of the coup and state of emergency ===
The state of emergency was caused in response to the coup attempt in July 2016 and remained in force during 2017. The Turkish government said the coup attempt was organized by Muslim cleric Fethullah Gülen and his movement, which is considered a terrorist organization. During 2017 the government suspended or fired thousands of public officials from state institutions, including more than 1000 Diyanet employees. The government continues to try individuals because it "openly disrespects the religious beliefs of a group" and continues to limit the rights of minority non-Muslims ", especially those not recognized under the Treaty of Lausanne in 1923. Religious minorities said they continued to have difficulty obtaining exemptions from obligatory religious classes in public schools, operations or opening houses of worship and in dealing with land and property disputes. The government also limits the efforts of minority religious groups to train their clerics.

== See also ==
- Human rights in Turkey
- Religion in Turkey
- Istanbul pogroms
- List of churches in Turkey
- List of mosques in Turkey
- List of synagogues in Turkey
- Racism in Turkey
- Varlık Vergisi
