= Cem (given name) =

Cem (Turkish pronunciation: [ˈdʒem]) is a Turkish male given name. It derives from Persian, where it is a shortened form of Jamshid. Notable people with the name are as follows:

- Cem Sultan (1459–1495), Ottoman prince
- Cem Adrian (born 1984), Turkish singer and songwriter
- Cem Akdağ (born 1956), Turkish basketball coach
- Cem Anhan (born 1991), German rapper of Kurdish origin
- Cem Atan (born 1985), Austrian footballer
- Cem Avşar (born 1988), Turkish politician and businessman
- Cem Bayoğlu (born 1977), Turkish photographer
- Cem Belevi (born 1973), Turkish actor and pop singer
- Cem Bölükbaşı (born 1998), Turkish racecar driver
- Cem Boyner (born 1955), Turkish businessman and short-time politician
- Cem Cáceres (born 1999), Dutch kickboxer
- Cem Can (born 1981), Turkish actor
- Cem Demir (born 1985), Turkish footballer
- Cem Efe (born 1978), German footballer and manager
- Cem Ersever (1950–1993), Turkish army officer
- Cem Ersoy, Turkish professor
- Cem Felek (born 1996), Azerbaijani footballer
- Cem Gelinoğlu (born 1983), Turkish actor and screenwriter
- Cem Gezinci (born 1985), Turkish Paralympic basketballer
- Cem Hakko (born 1955), Turkish fashion designer and businessman
- Cem İlkel (born 1995), Turkish tennis player
- Cem Ince (born 1993), German politician and parliamentarian
- Cem Islamoglu (born 1980), German footballer
- Cem Kaner, American academic
- Cem Karaca (1945–2004), Turkish rock musician
- Cem Karaca (born 1976), Turkish footballer
- Cem Karakaş, Turkish businessman
- Cem Kargın (born 1978), Turkish footballer
- Cem Kızıltuğ (born 1974), Turkish artist
- Cem Korkmaz (1987–2017), Turkish actor and YouTuber
- Cem Kozlu (born 1946), Turkish politician, businessman and writer
- Cem Öğretir (born 1973), Turkish reporter and TV presenter
- Cem Oral, German musician
- Cem Özdemir (born 1965), German politician of Turkish descent
- Cem Özdemir (born 1992), Turkish footballer
- Cem Özer (born 1959), Turkish actor
- Cem Pamiroğlu (born 1957), Turkish footballer
- Cem Say (born 1966), Turkish computer scientist and professor
- Cem Seymen, Turkish journalist
- Cem Stamati (born 1981), Turkish bass guitarist
- Cem Sultan (born 1991), Turkish footballer
- Cem Toker (born 1957), Turkish politician, businessman and economist
- Cem Tosun (born 1990), Turkish footballer
- Cem Tuncer (born 1978), Turkish jazz musician
- Cem Türkmen (born 2002), German-Turkish footballer
- Cem Uluğnuyan (born 1989), Turkish taekwondo practitioner
- Cem Uzan (born 1960), Turkish politician and businessman
- Cem Yiğit Üzümoğlu (born 1994), Turkish actor
- Cem Yıldırım (born 1961), Turkish mathematician
- Cem Yılmaz (born 1973), Turkish stand-up comedian
- Cem Yılmaz (born 1982), Turkish Olympian rower

== Anglicized version Jem ==
- Jem Karacan (born 1989), English footballer

== Middle name ==
- Hilmi Cem İntepe (born 1992), Turkish actor
- İsmail Cem Ulusoy (born 1996), Turkish basketballer
- Seyit Cem Ünsal (born 1975), Turkish footballer
- Sinan Cem Tanık (born 1980), Turkish volleyball player and coach
