= Osman Nuri Önügören =

Turkish businessman

- Born: March 17, 1934; Adil-Musul (Koyunlu), Niğde Province, Turkey
- Died: July 3, 2016 (aged 82)
- Occupation: Businessman
- Known for: One of the founders of the Turkish independence movement

Osman Nuri Önügören (17 March 1934 – 3 July 2016) was a prominent Turkish businessman. He became involved in politics and was one of the founders of the Turkish independence movement in the 1970s.

== Early life and education ==
Önügören was born in the village of Adil-Musul (Koyunlu, Niğde) in Niğde Province in 1934. He completed his primary school education in Afyon where his father served at the state railway. He was unable to continue his education after primary school because of the prevailing famine at the time as well as other reasons.

== Career ==
Unable to further his education, Önügören plied his trade as a street vendor in Ankara during his childhood. From this humble beginning, he went on to establish his first formal business in Bursa, after which he settled in Gemlik. Later on Önügören moved to Fatih in 1957, where he established Emek Trade, a prominent carpets and furniture business.

In 1971, he set up the Yatsan Bed factory. Later, in 1974, he founded the Birko Yarn factory in Niğde, together with partners.

In print media, he founded Milsan Printing and Milsan A.Ş. together with partners. He served as the chairman of the widely circulated national dailies, the National Gazette (Millî Gazete) and the New Age (Yeni Devir) for many years.

== Politics ==
Necmettin Erbakan formed the independence movement together with Önügören and others. Önügören would go on to become one of the founders of the National Salvation Party in 1972 together with 19 others. He served as a member of the management board until the party was closed by the junta, whereafter he joined the Welfare Party (RP), as a working cadre.

In the aftermath of the 1980 military coup, Önügören went on trial together with his leader, Erbakan.

== Later life and death ==
Towards retirement, he resolved to commit his life to the aid of those in need, establishing the "Adil Efendi Education, Culture and Solidarity Foundation" (ADEV) in 1995. He remained active as founding president and led the foundation until his death. He was also President of the Hırka-i Şerif Foundation for many years and was a leading member of other foundations and associations such as İlim Yayma Society, Birlik Foundation, Hakyol Foundation, and Birko Koyunlu Foundation. He died from a heart attack after the traditional iftar in the month of Ramadhan on 3 July 2016.

His funeral was led by his close friend and veteran religious leader, Mehmet Emin Saraç and was attended by scores of ordinary folk whose lives he has had left a mark on as well as dignitaries across party political divides, with President Erdoğan amongst those carrying his body to its final resting place. Others present at the funeral included Istanbul Governor Vasip Şahin, Istanbul Mayor Kadir Topbaş, Speaker of the Grand National Assembly, İsmail Kahraman, and opposition leaders.

== Legacy ==
He left a lasting legacy in the Koyunlu, Niğde community, where he was born. He built the Fatih Mosque Complex in Koyunlu, Niğde which is a central feature of the Koyunlu, Niğde community.
