= Corruption in Turkey =

Corruption in Turkey is an issue that affects the accession of Turkey to the European Union. Transparency International's Corruption Perception Index scores 182 countries according to their perceived level of public sector corruption on a scale of 0 (very corrupt) to 100 (very honest). Since the current scale was introduced in 2012, Turkey's score has fallen steadily from its highest score of 50 (2013) to its lowest, current score of 31 (2025). When the 182 countries in the Index were ranked by their 2025 score (with the country perceived to be most honest ranked 1), Turkey ranked 124. For comparison with regional scores, the best score among Eastern European and Central Asian countries (Note: Albania, Armenia, Azerbaijan, Belarus, Bosnia and Herzegovina, Georgia, Kazakhstan, Kosovo, Kyrgyzstan, Moldova, Montenegro, North Macedonia, Russia, Serbia, Tajikistan, Turkey, Turkmenistan, Ukraine, Uzbekistan) was 50, the average score was 34 and the worst score was 17. For comparison with worldwide scores, the best score was 89 (ranked 1), the average score was 42, and the worst score was 9 (ranked 181, in a two-way tie).

== Corruption cases ==
The 1998 Türkbank scandal led to a no-confidence vote and the resignation of Prime Minister Mesut Yılmaz. Although Yılmaz was investigated by Parliament, a five-year statute of limitations prevented further action. On 17 December 2013, the sons of three Turkish ministers and many prominent businesspeople were arrested and accused of corruption.

Following the closure of the Welfare Party in 1998, its leaders were required to return to the state the 896 billion Turkish Lira (rounded up to 1 trillion Turkish Lira) in treasury aid they held. This name was given to the lawsuit filed after the party failed to return the treasury aid to the state. Investigators in the case alleged that the money was presented as spent using forged documents. As a result of the case, Welfare Party leader Necmettin Erbakan was sentenced to 2 years and 4 months in prison for corruption. Sixty-eight Welfare Party leaders received prison sentences.

Another notable corruption scandal involved the arrest in 2025 of over 120 officials from the opposition Republican People’s Party (CHP), including former İzmir Mayor Tunç Soyer and İstanbul Mayor Ekrem İmamoğlu. The officials were implicated in the alleged tender rigging and fraud in municipal contracts. The opposition party, however, considers the arrest as politically-motivated. İzmir is considered a stronghold for opposition to Turkey's President Recep Tayyip Erdoğan.

Another major scandal centered around the assassination of Halil Falyalı, a casino magnate in Northern Cyprus, and the subsequent revelations by his former financial manager, Cemil Önal. Önal alleged that Falyalı funneled millions of dollars in bribes to Turkish officials, including members of Erdoğan’s inner circle. He was assassinated on February 5, 2025 in The Hague.

=== Assassination of Hrant Dink ===
The investigation into the 2007 assassination of Turkish-Armenian journalist Hrant Dink produced repeated allegations of misconduct and a possible cover-up involving members of the Turkish security services. In October 2007, NTV reported that the police file on Erhan Tuncel, a principal suspect and police informant, had been destroyed as a "state secret" before the court could examine it. The Dink family's lawyer stated that other evidence showing connections between the suspects and security personnel had also been destroyed or lost, including security-camera footage, and alleged that police intelligence chief Ramazan Akyürek ordered the destruction of a suspect's 48-page testimony. Questions about official conduct were reinforced when footage emerged showing the accused gunman Ogün Samast posing with a Turkish flag alongside police officers after his arrest, while one officer who participated in a celebratory photograph with Samast was later promoted to deputy police chief in Malatya. Investigators also examined allegations that police and gendarmerie personnel had advance knowledge of plans to kill Dink but failed to prevent the attack, and Akyürek and police commissioner Ali Fuat Yılmazer were accused of withholding such information from prosecutors, the gendarmerie, and intelligence services.

In 2010, the European Court of Human Rights ruled that Turkey had violated Dink's right to life by failing to take reasonable measures to prevent his murder despite information available to the authorities and by failing adequately to investigate official responsibility. In March 2021, an Istanbul court convicted 26 defendants in connection with the case, including officers from police intelligence and the Interior Ministry, for offenses that included destroying or forging official documents and crimes connected with Dink's killing, although 37 other defendants were acquitted.

== Anti-corruption legislation ==
Anti-Corruption legislation includes Turkey's Criminal Code which criminalizes various forms of corrupt activity, including active and passive bribery, attempted corruption, extortion, bribing a foreign official, money laundering and abuse of office. Nevertheless, anti-corruption laws are poorly enforced, and anti-corruption authorities are deemed ineffective. There is a lack of protection for whistleblowers.

== See also ==
- 2011 Turkish sports corruption scandal
- 2013 corruption scandal in Turkey
- Crime in Turkey
- Politics in Turkey
- Human rights in Turkey
- Lost Trillion Case
- Media of Turkey
- Türkbank scandal
- International Anti-Corruption Academy
- Group of States Against Corruption
- International Anti-Corruption Day
- ISO 37001 Anti-bribery management systems
- United Nations Convention against Corruption
- OECD Anti-Bribery Convention
- Transparency International
- 2026 Turkish investment fund scandal
