= Ahmet Hamdi Çamlı =

Turkish politician (born 1965)

Member of the Grand National Assembly
- In office 17 November 2015 – 7 April 2023
- Constituency: Istanbul (Nov 2015, 2018)

Personal details
- Born: 14 February 1965 (age 61) Istanbul, Turkey
- Parent: Zeki Çamlı (father)

Ahmet Hamdi Çamlı (born 14 February 1965) is a Turkish politician and former Member of Parliament for Istanbul, representing the Justice and Development Party during the 26th and 27th terms of the Turkish Grand National Assembly. He gained public attention for the 2017 "Yeliz incident", where he was linked to a social media account that sparked controversy, earning him the nickname "Yeliz".

== Early life ==
Çamlı was born on 14 February 1965 in the Fatih district of Istanbul. He is the son of Zeki Çamlı, one of the founders of the National Salvation Party and the short lived National Order Party. Çamlı's family is originally from Trabzon. Çamlı began his primary education at Fatih Primary School and completed his secondary education at Istanbul İmam Hatip High School.

Çamlı has stated he graduated from Newport International University with a degree in Behavioral Sciences. However, the legitimacy of this institution has been questioned. Newport University, originally founded in 1976 in California, USA, operates primarily as a distance education provider, offering certificate, undergraduate, postgraduate, and doctoral programs.

== Political career ==
He began his political career at a young age by joining the independent movements led by Necmettin Erbakan, leader of the Milli Görüş movement, which his father Ahmet Zeki had supported. He held various positions in the provincial, district and central organisations of these movements.

He served as a volunteer driver for Erbakan and Recep Tayyip Erdoğan. Çamlı has claimed he was imprisoned in Metris Prison alongside Recep Tayyip Erdoğan at the age of 14. This assertion, however, is inconsistent with historical records and Çamlı’s birth year of 1965. At that time, Çamlı would have been approximately 34 years old, making the claim of being 14 factually implausible.

He was elected to the Istanbul Provincial Assembly and Municipal Assembly as a member of the AK Party. He has served as a member of the Executive Board and Management Board of the Scouting and Guiding Federation of Turkey and as a member of the Management Board of the Turkish Athletics Federation. He served as President of the İstanbul Büyükşehir Belediyespor from 2014 to 2015.

Çamlı served as an AKP Member of Parliament for Istanbul during the 26th and 27th terms of the TBMM. Elected in the June 2015 Turkish general election for the 26th term, he was re-elected in the 2018 Turkish parliamentary election for the 27th term.

=== Yeliz incident ===
On 10 January 2017, during discussions on constitutional amendments to transition to a presidential system in the Turkish Grand National Assembly, Çamlı found himself at the centre of a controversy known as the "Yeliz incident". Çamlı was live-streaming the session on Periscope from a Twitter account named "Yeliz Adeley", which appeared to be a female profile, using the username "@yelizadeley". His identity was revealed when he accidentally turned on the front camera during the broadcast. The account in question was actively used for pro-AKP posts and online discussions, leading to accusations that Çamlı was conducting party propaganda through an anonymous account. The incident quickly spread on social media and in the Turkish media. Republican People's Party MPs mocked Çamlı in the TBMM by chanting "Yeliz" CHP MPs and social media users criticised Çamlı for attempting to manipulate public opinion by using a fake account. The account was closed shortly after the incident.

== Personal life ==
Çamlı is married to Fatma Hilal Çamlı, the niece of former politician Şevki Yılmaz, and has three children. His wedding in 1994 was attended by Recep Tayyip Erdoğan and Necmettin Erbakan, who served as witnesses.

He speaks intermediate English and Arabic.

== Controversies ==
Çamlı has been involved in several controversies, particularly related to his social media activity.

In 2018, former AKP MP Hüseyin Kocabıyık claimed Çamlı expressed disdain for the term "Turk" during a party meeting, stating, "I'm disgusted by the word Turk." This allegation further fueled criticism of Çamlı’s nationalist credentials.

In 2025, Çamlı was also implicated in a controversy involving alleged discounted property purchases from KİPTAŞ, an Istanbul Metropolitan Municipality housing company, during the AKP’s tenure, raising questions about preferential treatment.

On 6 July 2025, he posted on X, describing the founding of the Turkish Republic in 1923 as a "bloody coup" and referring to Turkey as "Çamuristan" (land of mud). The statements provoked widespread backlash, with opposition leaders, including CHP’s Özgür Özel who called Çamlı a "dishonorable organism", and social media users condemning Çamlı for disrespecting the Republic and Mustafa Kemal Atatürk. Furthermore, Özel announced that CHP MPs and all 81 provincial chairs would file criminal complaints against Çamlı for insulting the Republic and inciting hatred. The Atatürkist Thought Association also filed a criminal complaint. CHP branches in cities such as Manisa and Bursa submitted similar complaints, and İYİ Party leader Müsavat Dervişoğlu joined in condemning Çamlı’s remarks, stating that he would also file a complaint.

AK Party, through spokesperson Ömer Çelik, distanced itself from Çamlı’s remarks, affirming the Republic as a "precious asset," but faced criticism for not taking stronger action. In response, Çamlı denied being anti-Republic, accusing critics of twisting his words and calling them “Çamuriyetçi” (mud-slingers). He clarified that his issue was with the closure of the first Grand National Assembly and the rejection of historical roots, not the Republic itself.

On 9 July 2025, Çamlı sparked significant controversy with a social media post on X, responding to a user’s comment about PKK leader Abdullah Öcalan’s actions. Çamlı wrote, “Yours [referring to Mustafa Kemal Atatürk] massacred 50,000 Alevi babies, elderly, and women in Dersim alone.” The statement referenced the Dersim rebellion, a historical event involving a violent suppression of an uprising in the predominantly Alevi-populated Tunceli region by the Turkish state under Atatürk’s presidency.

=== Gülenist connections ===
Çamlı has been accused of having connections to the Gülen movement, which the Turkish government has officially designated as the Fethullahist Terrorist Organization (FETÖ). These claims stem primarily from social media posts attributed to Çamlı that surfaced in subsequent years. In 2019, a 2013 tweet by Çamlı was recirculated, in which he shared an article by Prof. Dr. Suat Yıldırım, titled “Fethullah Gülen or a Struggle for Virtue,” published in the Gülen-affiliated Zaman newspaper.

In the tweet, Çamlı wrote,

No matter the reason, bringing the Community and Hocaefendi, an important value, to this state cannot be excused!

The post, dated December 11, 2013, shortly before the 2013 corruption scandal in Turkey, was interpreted by critics as expressing support for Fethullah Gülen and his movement. Yıldırım, the article’s author, has been linked to Adil Öksüz, who plays a key part in the Gülen movement, adding to the controversy.

In 2022, another resurfaced post from the 2011 Turkish football match-fixing scandal period drew attention. Çamlı tweeted,

Aziz should not touch Fethullah Hoca with his dirty hands...

defending Gülen against former Fenerbahçe president Aziz Yıldırım, who had criticized Gülen. Çamlı’s use of "hoca" (teacher) for Gülen was cited as evidence of sympathy toward the Gülen movement.

In November 2013, Çamlı authored an article in the newspaper Milat, addressing Gülen as “valuable hocaefendi” and urging him to quell tensions between the Gülen movement and the AKP amid growing political friction.

Çamlı noted meeting Gülen alongside Recep Tayyip Erdoğan and Melih Gökçek, emphasizing the need to avoid “fitna” (discord) between the two groups.
