= Necmettin Erbakan Foundation =

The Necmettin Erbakan Foundation is a Turkish organization founded in Ankara in 2013 with the goal of promoting the ideology and projects of former Prime Minister Necmettin Erbakan. The president of the foundation is Fatih Erbakan, the son of Necmettin Erbakan.

== History ==
Upon the will of Necmettin Erbakan, it was founded by his children Fatih Erbakan and Elif Erbakan. Its aim is to spread the Millî Görüş, and to work in the scientific, moral, economic and political fields within the framework of the principles of this idea.

The Foundation was officially founded on Friday, June 14, 2013, with the application of the official certificate of the foundation to the General Directorate of Foundations. Necmettin Erbakan's residence, where he lived for many years in the Balgat district of Ankara, was opened with a ceremony on November 17, 2013, as the Headquarters of the Foundation.

In November 2017, the Foundation had 81 branches.

Erbakan Foundation has a joint work protocol with many non-governmental organizations in the international arena. There is a D-8 Economic Cooperation Organization established under the leadership of Necmettin Erbakan.
