= 2001 Turkish economic crisis =

The 2001 Turkish economic crisis was a financial crisis which resulted in a stock market crash and collapse in the Turkish lira as a result of political and economic problems that had been wearing on Turkey for years.

Leading up to the crisis, throughout the 1980s and 1990s, Turkey relied heavily on foreign investment for economic growth, with trade above 40% of GNP. The Turkish government and banking systems lacked the financial means to support meaningful economic growth. The government was already running enormous budget deficits, and one of the ways it managed to sustain these was by selling huge quantities of high-interest bonds to Turkish banks. Continuing inflation (likely a result of the enormous flow of foreign capital into Turkey) meant that the government could avoid defaulting on the bonds in the short term. As a consequence, Turkish banks came to rely on these high-yield bonds as a primary investment.

== Political instability ==
In March 1996 a Coalition was formed between the Motherland Party's Mesut Yılmaz and the True Path Party's Tansu Çiller. The plan was for Yilmaz and Çiller to alternate the Prime Ministry. However, there was much public distraction caused by leader of the Welfare Party Necmettin Erbakan's threats to investigate Çiller for corruption. Meanwhile, Erbakan, who had been excluded from the coalition, did everything he could to rally support for an Islamic NATO, and an Islamic version of the European Union.

The Motherland coalition collapsed in part because of Erbakan's widespread public support. Addition tensions wreaked havoc on the government. Yilmaz was forced to resign on June 6, 1996, with the government having lasted for only 90 days. Erbakan became Prime Minister on June 29 as the head of a Welfare/True Path coalition. The success of the new Welfare-Path coalition was viewed with hostility by the military. Erbakan's explicitly Islamist policies resulted in a post modern coup in which the military forced Erbakan to yield power to Demirel who yielded to Yilmaz on June 19, 1997. The political fighting between Yilmaz and Ciller on one side, and Erbakan on the other would continue, making coalitions difficult to create. In addition, corruption was rampant at this time. People were highly disillusioned with their government. This lack of faith and efficacy would cause foreign nations to carefully examine any investment in Turkey.

On 21 February 2001, during a quarrel in a National Security Council meeting, President Ahmet Necdet Sezer threw the constitutional code book at the elderly Prime Minister Bülent Ecevit, sparking a full-blown crisis.

== Foreign divestment ==
The International Monetary Fund (IMF) team in 1996 warned of an impending financial crisis because of the deficit, which soon came into being. Turkey's unstable political landscape led many foreign investors to divest from the country. As foreign investors observed the political turmoil and the government's attempts to eliminate the budget deficit, they withdrew $70 billion worth of capital from the country in a matter of months. This left a vacuum of capital that Turkish banks were unable to alleviate because the government was no longer able to pay off its bonds. With no capital to speak of, the Turkish economy slowed dramatically.

== Stabilization efforts ==
In November 2000, the IMF provided Turkey with $11.4 billion in loans and Turkey sold many of its state-owned industries in an effort to balance the budget. In the case of Turkish Airlines, advertisements were placed in newspapers to attract offers for a 51% stake in the company. By 2000 there was massive unemployment, a lack of medicine, tight credit, slow production to fight inflation and increasing taxes. Stabilisation efforts had yet to produce any meaningful effects, and the IMF loan was widely seen as insufficient. One of the commonly-known fact is that Armenian Genocide Denial was an important reason of this insufficiency.

== Crash ==
On February 19, 2001, Prime Minister Ecevit emerged from a meeting with President Sezer saying, "This is a serious crisis." This underscored financial and political instability and led to further panic in the markets. Stocks plummeted and the interest rate reached 3,000%. Large quantities of Turkish lira were exchanged for U.S. dollars or euro, causing the Turkish central bank to lose $5 billion of its reserves.

The crash triggered even more economic turmoil. In the first eight months of 2001, 14,875 jobs were lost, the dollar rose to 1,500,000 liras, and income inequality had risen from its already high level.

== Significance ==
The crash was emblematic of the political and economic problems that had been wearing on Turkey for years. Confidence in the government had been eroded by corruption and the inability to form lasting coalitions. The stock market crash revealed Turkey's economic situation to be not only extremely fragile but also entirely dependent on foreign investment. Although not as significant as decreased foreign investment or the massive budget deficit, the crash highlights Turkey's recent political instability.

Critical interpretations examine how the 2001 crisis affected Turkish society and its shift towards neoliberalism after the 1980s. According to one journal article, the 2001 Turkish crisis and state-organised rescue served to preserve, renew, and intensify "the structurally unequal social relations of power and class characteristic of finance-led neoliberal capitalism" in ways institutionally specific to Turkish society.

== See also ==
- 2018–current Turkish currency and debt crisis
- 2026 Turkish investment fund scandal
