= Istanbul (2nd electoral district) =

Electoral district for the Grand National Assembly of Turkey

Coordinates: 37°50′N 34°45′E

Istanbul (II)
- electoral district for the Grand National Assembly of Turkey
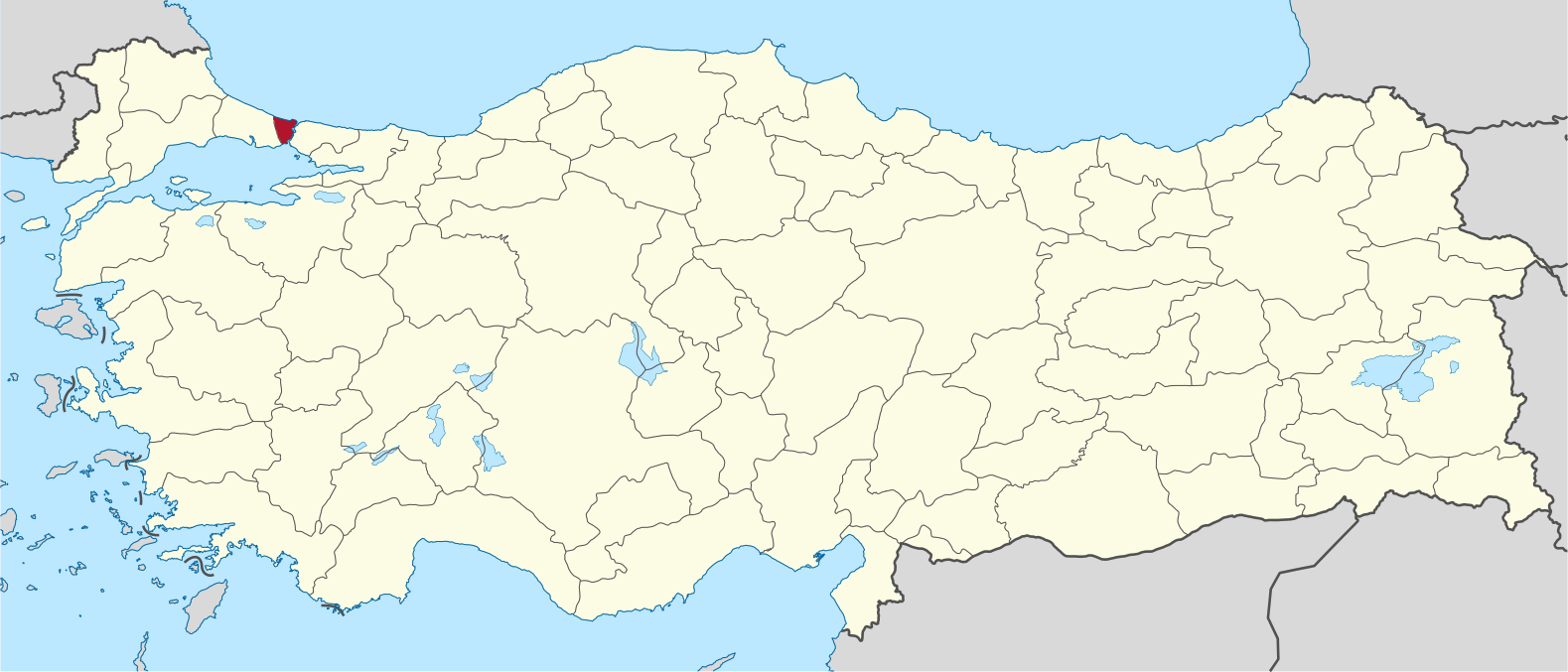
- Istanbul (II) shown within Turkey
- Province: Istanbul
- Electorate: 2,967,483

Current electoral district
- Created: 1923
- Seats: 27 Historical: 21 (1999–2007)
- Parent district: Istanbul
- Turnout at last election: 85.94%
- Representation
- AK Party: 11 / 27
- CHP: 5 / 27
- İYİ: 2 / 27
- Party of Greens and the Left Future: 2 / 27
- MHP: 1 / 27
- Others: 5 / 27

Istanbul's second electoral district is one of three divisions of the Istanbul electoral district for the purpose of elections to Grand National Assembly of Turkey. It elects twenty-seven members of parliament (deputies) to represent the district for a four-year term by the D'Hondt method, a party-list proportional representation system.

The district partially covers the European side of the Province of Istanbul, on the west of the Bosphorus. The third electoral district is situated to the west while the first electoral district occupies the Anatolian side of Istanbul on the east side of the Bosphorus.

== Division ==
The first electoral district contains the following Istanbul administrative districts (ilçe):

- Bayrampaşa
- Beşiktaş
- Beyoğlu
- Esenler
- Eyüpsultan
- Fatih
- Gaziosmanpaşa
- Kağıthane
- Sarıyer
- Sultangazi
- Şişli
- Zeytinburnu

== Members ==
Population reviews of each electoral district are conducted before each general election, which can lead to certain districts being granted a smaller or greater number of parliamentary seats. Istanbul (II) gained 6 extra seats for the 2011 general election, thus electing 27 seats as opposed to 2q that it elected in 1999, 2002 and 2007.

MPs for Istanbul (II), 1999 onwards
| Election | | 1999 (21st Parliament) | | 2002 (22nd Parliament) | | 2007 (23rd Parliament) | 2011 (24th Parliament) | June 2015 (25th Parliament) |
| MP | | Sadettin Tantan; ANAP | Mehmet Ali Şahin; AK Party | Ayşenur Bahçekapılı; AK Party | | | | |
| MP | | Yılmaz Karakoyunlu; ANAP | Egemen Bağış; AK Party | | | Nimet Baş; AK Party | | |
| MP | Nesrin Naş; ANAP | Murat Başesgioğlu; AK Party | | | Ahmet Baha Öğütken; AK Party | | | |
| MP | Ali Emre Kocaoğlu; ANAP | Burhan Kuzu; AK Party | | | | | | |
| MP | Hüsamettin Özkan; DSP | Hüseyin Kansu; AK Party | Necat Birinci; AK Party | Volkan Bozkır; AK Party | | | | |
| MP | Ziya Aktaş; DSP | Mustafa Baş; AK Party | Nimet Çubukçu; AK Party | İbrahim Yiğit; AK Party | | | | |
| MP | Osman Kılıç; DSP | Alaattin Büyükkaya; AK Party | | | Ahmet Kutalmış Türkeş; AK Party | | | |
| MP | Tahir Köşe; DSP | Hayati Yazıcı; AK Party | | | İsmail Safi; AK Party | | | |
| MP | Hüseyin Mert; DSP | Ekrem Erdem; AK Party | Canan Kalsın; AK Party | Ekrem Erdem; AK Party | | | | |
| MP | Zafer Güler; DSP | Recep Koral; AK Party | | | Türkan Dağoğlu; AK Party | | | |
| MP | Ahmet Güzel; DSP | Nimet Çubukçu; AK Party | Ömer Dinçer; AK Party | Hüseyin Bürge; AK Party | | | | |
| MP | Perihan Doğan Yılmaz; DSP | Zeynep Karahan Uslu; AK Party | Osman Gazi Yağmurdereli; AK Party | Şirin Ünal; AK Party | | | | |
| MP | Celal Adan; DYP | İbrahim Reyhan Özal; AK Party | Necla Arat; CHP | Sevim Savaşer; AK Party | | | | |
| MP | Ismail Kahraman; Virtue | Mehmet Sevigen; CHP | | | Osman Aşkın Bak; AK Party | | | |
| MP | | Mehmet Ali Şahin; Virtue | | Bülent Hasan Tanla; CHP | | Mustafa Özyürek; CHP | Ahmet Haldun Ertürk; AK Party | |
| MP | | Nevzat Yalçıntaş; Virtue | | Onur Öymen; CHP | | Mithat Melen; MHP | Murat Başesgioğlu; MHP | |
| MP | | Hüseyin Kansu; Virtue | | Hasan Fehmi Güneş; CHP | | Ümit Şafak; MHP | Celal Adan; MHP | |
| MP | | Mustafa Baş; Virtue | | Ersin Arıoğlu; CHP | | Çetin Soysal; CHP | Sırrı Süreyya Önder; Independent / HDP | |
| MP | | Bahri Zengin; Virtue | | Kemal Kılıçdaroğlu; CHP | | | | |
| MP | | Murat Sökmenoğlu; MHP | | Bihlun Tamaylıgil; CHP | | | | |
| MP | | Nazif Okumuş; MHP | | Memduh Hacioğlu; CHP | | Süleyman Yağız; CHP | Mustafa Sezgin Tanrıkulu; CHP | |
| MP | No seat | | | | | | Aydın Ağan Ayaydın; CHP | |
| MP | No seat | | | | | | Sedef Küçük; CHP | |
| MP | No seat | | | | | | Ercan Cengiz; CHP / Centre | |
| MP | No seat | | | | | | Haluk Eyidoğan; CHP | |
| MP | No seat | | | | | | Aykut Erdoğdu; CHP | |
| MP | No seat | | | | | | Melda Onur; CHP | |

== General elections ==
=== 2011 ===
2011 general election: Istanbul (II)
| Party | Candidate | Votes | % | ±% |
|---|---|---|---|---|
| AK Party | 15 elected ▲3: 1. Nimet Çubukçu ✓; 2. Ayşe Nur Bahçekapılı ✓; 3. Burhan Kuzu ✓; 4. Ekrem Erdem ✓; 5. Volkan Bozkır ✓; 6. İbrahim Yiğit ✓; 7. Ahmet Kutalmış Türkeş ✓; 8. İsmail Safi ✓; 9. Türkan Dağoğlu ✓; 10. Şirin Ünal ✓; 11. Sevim Savaşer ✓; 12. Hüseyin Bürge ✓; 13. Osman Aşkın Bak ✓; 14. Ahmet Haldun Ertürk ✓; 15. Ahmet Baha Öğütken ✓; 16. Ahmet Hamdi Çamlı ✗; 17. Osman Köksal ✗; 18. Adem Ali Yılmaz ✗; 19. Üzeyir İlbak ✗; 20. Emin Haberdar ✗; 21. Ahmet Özel ✗; 22. Hüseyin Eroğlu ✗; 23. Ahmet Yıldız ✗; 24. Seçil Sayın Elmas ✗; 25. Nadir Uzun ✗; 26. Erol Günay ✗; 27. Ali Rıza Abdik ✗ | 1,273,826 | 51.04 | ▲5.67 |
| CHP | 9 elected ▲2: 1. Kemal Kılıçdaroğlu ✓; 2. Bihlun Tamaylıgil ✓; 3. Mustafa Sezgin Tanrıkulu ✓; 4. Aydın Ağan Ayaydın ✓; 5. Sedef Küçük ✓; 6. Ercan Cengiz ✓; 7. Haluk Eyidoğan ✓; 8. Aykut Erdoğdu ✓; 9. Melda Onur ✓; 10. Bahri Sipahi ✗; 11. Çetin Soysal ✗; 12. İrfan Hüseyin Yıldız ✗; 13. Bülent Seyhan ✗; 14. Hüseyin Yaşar ✗; 15. Gülseren Onanç ✗; 16. Bayram Güven ✗; 17. Yasemin Öney Cankurtaran ✗; 18. Raif Balkaroğlu ✗; 19. Hakan Atalay ✗; 20. Seyfullah Beysülen ✗; 21. Özge Çağrı Toraman ✗; 22. Mari Gormezano ✗; 23. Cem Seymen ✗; 24. Müşerref Aksak ✗; 25. Bilge Koçkaya ✗; 26. Cem Cengiz Yılmaz ✗; 27. Kenan Malkoç ✗ | 733,388 | 29.39 | ▲4.03 |
| MHP | 2 elected 0: 1. Murat Başesgioğlu ✓; 2. Ümit Şafak ✓; 3. Celal Adan ✗; 4. Ümit Özdağ ✗; 5. Saffet Sancaklı ✗; 6. Ahmet Çolak ✗; 7. Esra Selimoğlu ✗; 8. Yusuf Günay ✗; 9. Özcan Pehlivanoğlu ✗; 10. İsrafil Çelik ✗; 11. Yurdanur Çebi ✗; 12. Sabahattin Yıldız ✗; 13. Rüstem Fırat ✗; 14. Pınar Çapar ✗; 15. Hikmet Karaçay ✗; 16. Arif Köroğlu ✗; 17. Yasemin Yıldırım ✗; 18. Ahmet Özyürek ✗; 19. Rıza Erol ✗; 20. Selahattin Önder ✗; 21. Kamil Balyer ✗; 22. Zekeriya Kökrek ✗; 23. Hamit Gürhan ✗; 24. Aydın Deliktaşlı ✗; 25. Muhammed Emin Özkurt ✗; 26. Mehmet Edip Tekkol ✗; 27. Gülseren Güçlüer ✗ | 229,385 | 9.19 | ▼0.74 |
| Independent | 1 elected ▲1: Sırrı Süreyya Önder ✓ Refik Özmen ✗ Çetin Doğan ✗ Fatma Ragibe Kanıkuru Loğoğlu ✗ Cemal Şenol ✗ Ekrem Şit ✗ Abdürrahim Göze ✗ Sedat Çetintaş ✗ | 135,322 | 5.42 | ▼0.74 |
| SAADET | None elected: 1. Mustafa Kamalak ✗; 2. Temel Karamollaoğlu ✗; 3. Lütfi Kibiroğlu ✗; 4. Dursun Ali Düzenli ✗; 5. Mustafa Kaya ✗; 6. Yaşar Kangel ✗; 7. Pakize Yüzbaşıoğlu ✗; 8. Hasan Akpınar ✗; 9. Abdullah Deniz ✗; 10. Erol Urhan ✗; 11. Hüseyin Bundar ✗; 12. Cengiz Ertekin ✗; 13. Necati Ermiş ✗; 14. Mustafa Yaman ✗; 15. Zeynep Şule Rıdvanoğlu ✗; 16. Emre Ustaosmanoğlu ✗; 17. Mahmut Celal Terzi ✗; 18. Muzaffer Ercanlı ✗; 19. Muhammet Hanefi Çolak ✗; 20. Nihat Şadoğlu ✗; 21. Burhan Satır ✗; 22. Bilal Ay ✗; 23. Burhan Akar ✗; 24. Özbay Yağmurkaya ✗; 25. Ahmet Balcı ✗; 26. Ali Candır ✗; 27. İslam İnce ✗ | 49,338 | 1.98 | ▼1.75 |
| HAS Party | None elected: 1. Numan Kurtulmuş ✗; 2. Hasan Basri Aktan ✗; 3. Musa Demirci ✗; 4. Emel Topcu ✗; 5. Türker Saltabaş ✗; 6. Cemal Avci ✗; 7. Cahit Başaran ✗; 8. Arif Calban ✗; 9. Kerime Tunçbilek ✗; 10. Recep Doğan ✗; 11. Halit Atmaca ✗; 12. Mehmet Akif Seylan ✗; 13. Hamit Hatipoğlu ✗; 14. Abdulkadir Akyol ✗; 15. Nazmiye Kabakcı ✗; 16. İdris Kara ✗; 17. Suphi Yerli ✗; 18. Elif Gürgöl ✗; 19. Ahmet Kabanlı ✗; 20. Hanna Yılmaz ✗; 21. Esra Hiçdurmaz ✗; 22. Mustafa Arslan ✗; 23. Erdoğan Tüysüz ✗; 24. Hakan Zini ✗; 25. Yaşar Demirci ✗; 26. Ali Başaran ✗; 27. İlker Aydın ✗ | 18,131 | 0.73 | ▲0.73 |
| Büyük Birlik | None elected: 1. Bayram Karacan ✗; 2. Ekrem Dörtbudak ✗; 3. Cafer Sadık Doğan ✗; 4. Muharrem Çelik ✗; 5. Asim Deniz ✗; 6. Sabri Temtek ✗; 7. Salim Ethem Mican ✗; 8. Cihan Şerbet ✗; 9. Mesut Yegengil ✗; 10. Mustafa Almalı ✗; 11. Mustafa Karabulut ✗; 12. Satılmış Yücel ✗; 13. Alaattin Köse ✗; 14. Mürvet Doğan ✗; 15. Selahattin Keleş ✗; 16. Meral Venedik ✗; 17. Esengül Bakan ✗; 18. Sinan Çayır ✗; 19. Songül Ayaz ✗; 20. Tülay Kızılarmut ✗; 21. Gürsel Yılmaz ✗; 22. Ayşe Peskütancı ✗; 23. Kenan Helvalı ✗; 24. Halil Yıldırım ✗; 25. Birol Uçar ✗; 26. Mehmet Tali ✗; 27. Süleyman Şen ✗ | 16,094 | 0.64 | ▲0.64 |
| DP | None elected: 1. Namık Kemal Zeybek ✗; 2. Haluk Bozovalı ✗; 3. İbrahim Berk ✗; 4. Bahtiyar Muhammet Erdoğan ✗; 5. Hakkı Çakır ✗; 6. Ahmet Lacin ✗; 7. Ayhan Aşan ✗; 8. Özcan Çoban ✗; 9. Diğdem Akyazı ✗; 10. Osman Yılmaz ✗; 11. Mehmet Özdemir ✗; 12. Yaşar Gökdaş ✗; 13. Murat Dönmez ✗; 14. Mehmet Ergöl ✗; 15. Müge Boncukçu ✗; 16. Abdülhalim Semerkandi ✗; 17. Ayten Yılmaz ✗; 18. Hüseyin Aksoy ✗; 19. Mehmet Kurhan ✗; 20. Ali Rıza Tunay ✗; 21. Safinaz Taşkıran ✗; 22. İsmail Altun ✗; 23. Emine Yerli ✗; 24. Halit Paşalı ✗; 25. Sevgi Aka ✗; 26. Bekir Türkeş ✗; 27. Ramazan Aktaş ✗ | 10,673 | 0.43 | ▼2.67 |
| HEPAR | None elected: 1. Ali Atilla Arsan ✗; 2. Kut Emre Ertan ✗; 3. Selahattin Yavuz ✗; 4. Ömür Atahan ✗; 5. Murat Akbaş ✗; 6. Murat Can ✗; 7. Turgay Özbek ✗; 8. Hande Coşkun ✗; 9. Selim Serhatlı ✗; 10. Volkan Emre Türk ✗; 11. Aslıhan Yurdalan ✗; 12. Kevser Sarıkök ✗; 13. Hilal Arslan ✗; 14. Yeliz Vayni ✗; 15. Semra İrgin ✗; 16. Şerife Handan Ozman ✗; 17. Şebnem Pehlivan ✗; 18. Alper Bahar ✗; 19. Burak Baltacı ✗; 20. Deniz Ilgaz Arıtan ✗; 21. Cihan Berk ✗; 22. Ömer Efe ✗; 23. Ertuğrul Birses ✗; 24. Arzu Kahya ✗; 25. İdris Çeşmeci ✗; 26. Tolga Derindere ✗; 27. Akif Ormancı ✗ | 10,583 | 0.42 | ▲0.42 |
| DSP | None elected: 1. Mahmut Yılbaş ✗; 2. Hadimi Soydal Sılay ✗; 3. Mustafa Aslan ✗; 4. Mahmut Aslan ✗; 5. Nesrin Altın ✗; 6. Hikmet Kabuk ✗; 7. Bayram İğdeli ✗; 8. Mustafa Taşpulat ✗; 9. Ali Kama ✗; 10. Selami Büyükturgay ✗; 11. İbrahim Bayraktar ✗; 12. Uğur Seten ✗; 13. Mustafa Yavuz Dizdar ✗; 14. Semiha Sevimsoy ✗; 15. Mustafa Ketenci ✗; 16. Lebibe Yurdakul ✗; 17. Nalan Ergin ✗; 18. Hayri Ethem Yüksel ✗; 19. Erdoğan Demircan ✗; 20. Ahmet Aşıcı ✗; 21. Mustafa Bodur ✗; 22. Mehmet Sinan Keçeli ✗; 23. İsa Şahin ✗; 24. Tuğçe Güryol ✗; 25. Uğur Şener ✗; 26. Cem Karadağ ✗; 27. İsmail Acer ✗ | 7,561 | 0.30 | N/A |
| TKP | None elected: 1. Erkan Baş ✗; 2. Metin Kurt ✗; 3. Selen Kartay ✗; 4. Çetin Yüksel ✗; 5. Sunay Gedik ✗; 6. İrfan Ertel ✗; 7. Ahmet Kamil Tekerek ✗; 8. Raci Bostancı ✗; 9. Gülten Çakıcıoğlu ✗; 10. Sermin Önal ✗; 11. Şahin Arlı ✗; 12. Tarkan Konar ✗; 13. Koray Türkay ✗; 14. Tahsin Erbaş ✗; 15. Cemal Gül ✗; 16. İsa Daşdemir ✗; 17. Engin Arslan ✗; 18. Bilge Han Acılıoğlu ✗; 19. Emine Erdoğan ✗; 20. Yelda Koçak Urfa ✗; 21. Nazife Altuner ✗; 22. Metin Ceylan ✗; 23. İdil Zeynep Öztürk ✗; 24. Burçin Duan ✗; 25. Muhammet Zafer Urfa ✗; 26. Ünzüle Çelik ✗; 27. Özlem Özdemir ✗ | 4,709 | 0.19 | ▼0.02 |
| MP | None elected: 1. Aykut Edibali ✗; 2. Filiz Edibali ✗; 3. Mustafa Koçak ✗; 4. Özcan Yay ✗; 5. Salim Yılmaz ✗; 6. Celil Aydın ✗; 7. Süleyman Ersen ✗; 8. Nefise Demirezen ✗; 9. Osman Kılıç ✗; 10. Nedim Aksoy ✗; 11. Serdal Batmaz ✗; 12. Nebiha Doğan ✗; 13. Hüseyin Abdullahoğlu ✗; 14. Dursun Erdem ✗; 15. Murat İstanbullu ✗; 16. Aziz Çevik ✗; 17. Abdullah Cankal ✗; 18. Oya Veyis ✗; 19. Mustafa Karataş ✗; 20. Cemal Özcan ✗; 21. Necmiye Ünal ✗; 22. Emine Özdemir ✗; 23. Hava Çelik ✗; 24. Gürcan Dündar ✗; 25. Kenan Kars ✗; 26. Şükrü Cebeci ✗; 27. Nilgün Üyüklüer ✗ | 4,190 | 0.17 | ▲0.17 |
| Nationalist Conservative | None elected: 1. Burhanettin Aktürk ✗; 2. Binali Arslan ✗; 3. Bekir Resuloğlu ✗; 4. Ali Demir ✗; 5. Türkan Karabacak ✗; 6. Beyhan Aktürk ✗; 7. Mesut Şahin ✗; 8. Nuri Soy ✗; 9. Nejat Karadayı ✗; 10. Menekşe Öztürk ✗; 11. Aydan Horat ✗; 12. Mikail Göktaş ✗; 13. Sevda Benli ✗; 14. Şahin Göktaş ✗; 15. Cengiz Açıkgöz ✗; 16. Totoç Bektaş ✗; 17. Münevver Ordu ✗; 18. Murat Budak ✗; 19. Erdal Şentürk ✗; 20. Aysun Yıldırım ✗; 21. Hamza Tabay ✗; 22. Nuray Parlak ✗; 23. Gülay Tatar ✗; 24. Hatice Polat ✗; 25. Sema Uslu ✗; 26. Hatice Demirata ✗; 27. Kenan Açıkgöz ✗ | 1,233 | 0.05 | ▲0.05 |
| LDP | None elected: 1. Özcan Arslan ✗; 2. Vedat Kohen ✗; 3. Yusuf Köse ✗; 4. Murat Daldaban ✗; 5. Olcayto Satı ✗; 6. Sonay Kale ✗; 7. Zeki Karaoğlu ✗; 8. Mustafa Mert Dolgun ✗; 9. Birsen Süslü ✗; 10. Abdullah Şengül ✗; 11. Vural Köse ✗; 12. Murat Özmen ✗; 13. Sibel Ersöz ✗; 14. İbrahim Aksu ✗; 15. Filiz Daştan ✗; 16. Dudu Erol ✗; 17. Bircan Alkan ✗; 18. Fatma Çileci ✗; 19. Mehmet Hayri Cüneydi ✗; 20. İbrahim Köseoğlu ✗; 21. Ferudun Aydoğan ✗; 22. Murat Orhan ✗; 23. Faik Mustafa Çelikdemir ✗; 24. Çağın Külhan ✗; 25. Müge İlgen ✗; 26. Veysel Dağ ✗; 27. Ali Işık ✗ | 1,148 | 0.05 | ▼0.03 |
| DYP | No candidates | 0 | 0.00 | ▼0.00 |
| Labour | No candidates | 0 | 0.00 | 0.00 |
| Total votes | | 2,495,581 | 100.00 | |
| Rejected ballots | | 54,774 | 2.15 | ▼3.22 |
| Turnout | | 2,550,355 | 85.94 | ▲4.64 |
| AK Party hold Majority | | 540,438 | 21.66 | ▲1.29 |
