= Raiders Organization =

Turkish Islamist group

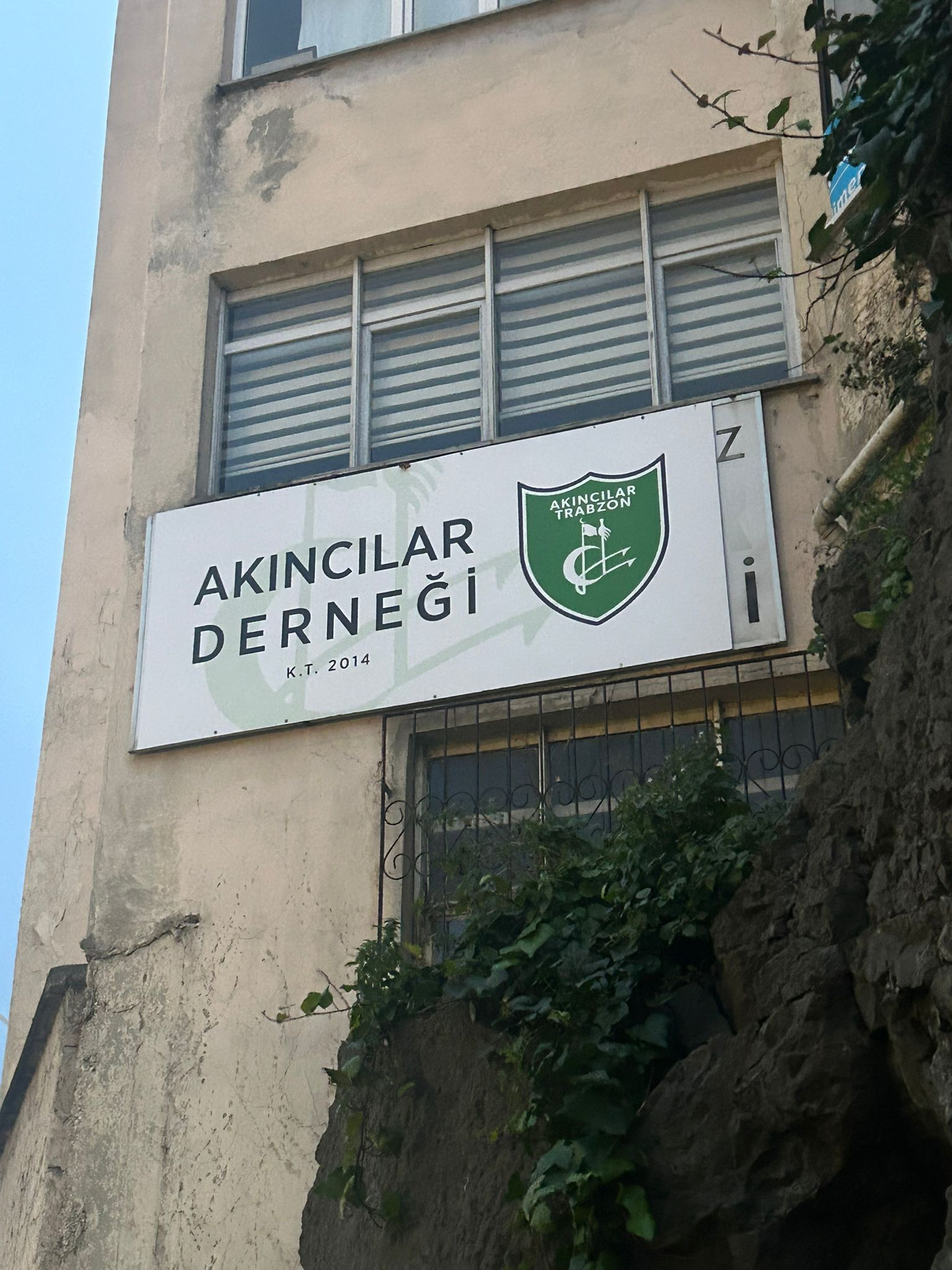
- Founder: Tevfik Rıza Çavuş
- Leader: Fahri Çınar
- Founded: December 12, 1975, Ankara
- Country: Turkey
- Ideology: Islamism; Millî Görüş; Pan-Islamism; Anti-communism; Anti-fascism; Anti-Wahhabism; Anti-Salafism; Anti-Zionism; Antisemitism; Anti-nationalism; Moderate patriotism Anti-Kemalism; Desecularization; Anticapitalism; Anti-liberalism; Anti-socialism
- Political position: Far-right
- Part of: MSP (until 1981)
- Wars: Political violence in Turkey(1976-1980)
- Website: akıncılar.net.tr

The Raiders Organization (Turkish: Akıncılar Derneği) is an Islamist sociopolitical group active in Turkey. It was involved in Political violence in Turkey (1976-1980) It was the paramilitary wing of the National Salvation Party (MSP) until 1981, after which it acted independently.

== History ==
It was founded in Ankara on December 12, 1975, by a group of university students under the leadership of Tevfik Rıza Çavuş, with the goal of turning Turkey into an Islamic state. They were significantly influenced by the Iranian Revolution. The Raiders rapidly grew to over 1,200 branches across Turkey. It was a part of MSP and then became an independent organization after MSP's closure. Later, the Ankara Martial Law Command closed the Raiders Organisation, although it continued to defy all closures by operating underground and through rebranded organizations. The Raiders had both Turkish and Kurdish members, although it became Turkish majority after many of its Kurds switched their allegiance to Kurdish Hezbollah after it was founded, and began fighting in the insurgency. Unlike the Raiders, the Kurdish Hezbollah wanted to achieve its goals with violence, and made takfir, and were much stricter. The Raiders have many affiliated organisations, such as the Raider Scholar Union (Akıncı Liseliler Birliği), a faction for employees (AK-Mem), Raider Sportsmen Organization (Akıncı Sporcular Derneği) and Raider Workers (AK-İş). Since 2011, the Raiders are led by Fahri Çınar. The Raiders' ideologies are Millî Görüş, pan-Islamism, anti-communism, anti-fascism, and anti-Salafism. The Raiders oppose Turkish nationalism and advocate for moderate patriotism, to an extent that it does not cause hatred between people. They also claim that nationalism and fascism are ideologies of the Western world and have no place in Turkey or Islamic nations. The Raiders are not only anti-Zionist, but antisemitic as well.

The Raiders had a conflict with Idealists (MHP, BBP) as well. Because the Raiders did not agree with the extreme fanatic nationalism of Idealists, Idealists began calling them "green communists" despite the Raiders' known hatred for communism. Throughout the 1970s, Raiders would often engage in violence with Idealists. In Mersin, during the violence, a group of Raiders brawled with Idealists at a mosque, which resulted in many of the Idealists being bloodied and having lifelong scars. At schools, Raider students would often provoke Idealist students by trying to refute their Islamist-Nationalist ideology, and asking them controversial questions such as "If there was an event and you had to donate blood to one of two, would you choose a non-Muslim Turk or a non-Turkish Muslim?", which would irritate Idealist students, who claimed that the Raiders' only job was to cause trouble. In 1977, a Raider had also threatened an Idealist shop owner on the street by saying "have you ever tasted a Muslim bullet?". In 1978, a group of Raiders were brutally beating an Idealist youth in front of a mosque, causing another Idealist passerby to stop them, which led to a shootout between the two sides until police intervened. A group of Raiders later came out of their building, located across the street from the mosque, and began shooting at the Idealists, reportedly turning the street into a "battlefield". The Raiders criticised Idealists, saying "no matter where the idea of nationalism comes from, no matter who accepts it; it is fragmentary, divisive. It pits Muslims belonging to different races against each other. Islam, on the other hand, is the gatherer and the unifier". The Raiders, after the assassination of Metin Yüksel, referred to Idealists as "racist munafiqeen, who are the fascistic product of imperialism", likely referring to Alparslan Türkeş's experience working with the United States.

Recep Tayyip Erdoğan was a member of the Raiders during his youth, and after he came to power in Turkey, the Raiders were more free to do their activities, and much of the stigma that was associated with them during previous years was removed.

On August 23rd, 1980, Turkish soldiers attempted to raid a camp belonging to the Raiders' youth organization, "Akıncı Gençler Derneği" (Raider Youth Organisation) in Kayseri. The Turkish soldiers were met by gunshots, but they managed to get inside the camp. The search revealed five handguns, four hunting rifles, ammunition, and dynamite. Banners in the camp had inscriptions such as "Sharia or death!" And "Every Raider is like a bullet. We will establish the Islamic state."

== See also ==
- Great Eastern Islamic Raiders' Front
