= Lost Trillion Case =

Turkish corruption scandal in 1998

The Lost Trillion Case, also known as the Missing Trillion Case, (Turkish: Kayıp Trilyon Davası) was an embezzlement scandal in Turkey involving the use of forged documents by the Welfare Party (Turkish: Refah Partisi, RP) executives to prevent the return of Treasury grants in amount of around one trillion old Turkish lira, i.e. ₺261 million in 2024 currency following the ban of the party in 1998. Party leader and former prime minister Necmettin Erbakan as well as 68 party officials received prison sentences after a court trial, although the former's was commuted to house arrest.

== Background ==
The Welfare Party, an Islamist political party in Turkey founded and led by Necmettin Erbakan (1926–2011), had received grants from the Treasury in accordance with the applicable laws. In June 1998, the coalition cabinet of Erbakan was forced to resign following the submission of a memorandum by the military on February 28, 1997. The same year, the Constitutional Court banned the Welfare Party on the grounds that it tried to overthrow Turkey's secular system and to promote Islamic fundamentalism. Erbakan was suspended from active politics for a term of five years. The bans were upheld by the European Court of Human Rights as well.

The Treasury requested the return of the financial aid worth around one trillion lira (₺261 million in 2024) from the then-closed RP. The amount was rounded from 896 billion lira (₺234 million in 2024). The party executives declared that the funds were spent on party activities. However, an investigation found that the amount was converted into 10 million Deutsche Mark (7.29 million Euro in 2021) and was then deposited in Yapı ve Kredi Bankası. Early in 1997, the amount was withdrawn from the bank.

== Trial and conviction ==
In the beginning of 1999, Erbakan and 78 party members were prosecuted by the First High Penal Court of Sincan in Ankara. They were accused of embezzling trillions by forging 139 official party documents with the intention to hide the grants, which the Treasury ordered back. The case became known as the "Lost Trillion Case" or the "Missing Trillion Case" (Turkish: Kayıp Trilyon Davası). Among the defendants were prominent politicians like Şevket Kazan, former Minister of Justice, and Ahmet Tekdal, co-founder and first leader of the party.

In March 2002, Erbakan received a prison sentence of two years and four months. The court convicted 68 party officials to sentences of up to one year and two months in prison. The court's decision was approved by the Supreme Court of Appeals.

Abdullah Gül, who was the vice chairman of the party responsible for foreign affairs, joined another Islamist party, the Virtue Party (Turkish: Fazilet Partisi, FP), in 1998. He was re-elected into the parliament in 1999. His parliamentary immunity at the time of the trial spared him from prosecution.

Erbakan's imprisonment was adjourned four times as he submitted medical reports about his poor health condition. The last adjournment took place in July 2005 for six month time. After the end of the term, he applied for the re-opening of his case, which was rejected in first and second instance. In April 2006, the Supreme Court of Appeals annulled the court's decision from March 2002. In accordance with the in-the-meantime-amended law, the court reduced Erbakan's sentence to eleven months and two days in house arrest.

Erbakan began to serve his sentence at his summer residence in Altınoluk of Edremit, Balıkesir in house arrest in May 2008. Upon his application of pardoning, Abdullah Gül, at that time the President of Turkey, pardoned Erbakan on permanent health grounds in August 2008.

== Former Turkish President's testimony ==
Abdullah Gül had been exempted from the trial due to his parliamentary immunity. Later, as he became state president in August 2007, he could not be brought before the court as, according to the Constitution, presidents may not be tried for any allegations other than treason. The re-opened case in 2008 referred to him as a "suspect". He expressed his willingness to appear before the court. However, the case remained for him frozen until the end of his presidency term in August 2014.

The criminal court in Ankara decreed that Gül testifies for charges of falsifying official documents as the crime was committed before his presidency. Judicial experts are of the opinion that he would have been acquitted even he was tried because his responsibilities in the party were not of financial nature. As an example, RP officials Şevket Kazan, Recai Kutan, Oğuzhan Asiltürk, the deputy chairman and even the general accountant were all acquitted in the past.

Gül announced his readiness to testify in the "Lost Trillion Case" right after he handed over his post as state president in late August. In November 2014, he testified before the court with the motive of "having justice operate flawlessly and seamlessly" and "in order not to leave any doubt on any issue".

On December 6, 2014, the Head Public Prosecutor of Ankara announced its conclusion in the case as nolle prosequi ("unwilling to pursue") due to missing evidence required for a public lawsuit.
