= Fatih Erbakan =

Turkish politician (born 1979)

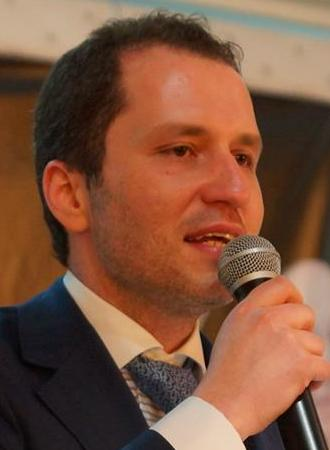

Member of the Grand National Assembly
- Incumbent
- Assumed office 2 June 2023
- Constituency: Istanbul II (2023)

Leader of the New Welfare Party
- Incumbent
- Assumed office 23 November 2018
- Preceded by: Party established

Personal details
- Born: Muhammed Ali Fatih Erbakan; 1 January 1979 (age 47) Ankara, Turkey
- Party: New Welfare Party (2018–present)
- Other political affiliations: Virtue Party (1999–2001); Felicity Party (2001–15)
- Spouse: Beyza Molu (m. 2003)
- Children: 2
- Parent: Necmettin Erbakan (father)
- Education: Başkent University

Muhammed Ali Fatih Erbakan (born January 1, 1979) is a Turkish politician and electrical engineer who has led the Islamist New Welfare Party (YRP) since founding it in 2018. He is a son of former Prime Minister of Turkey, Necmettin Erbakan and has been a member of the Grand National Assembly for Istanbul's 2nd election district sine 2023.

Erbakan was active in the youth organisations of the Virtue and Felicity parties and unsuccessfully contested the Felicity party leadership in 2014 before founding the YRP, which he presents as the continuation of his father's Milli Görüş movement. the YRP contested the 2023 general election on its own lists within the people's alliance, winning five seats. In the 2024 local election it ran against the AKP, finishing third nationally with 6.19% and winning the Şanlıurfa metropolitan municipality and Yozgat. He said he will be the party's candidate in the next presidential election.

His public profile has been designed by his opposition to the to the Istanbul Convention and thew LGBTQ rights, his call to restrict trade with Israel and to close the Kürecik Radar Station, and his statements on COVID-19 vaccines that drew widespread criticism.

== Early life ==
Fatih Erbakan was born on 1 January 1979 in Ankara, the capital city of Turkey. He completed his secondary education at an İmam Hatip institution and his high school education at Ankara Ayrancı High School. He graduated from Başkent University in the field of electrical engineering. He went to England to continue his higher education in pursuit of a Master's degree, but returned to Turkey in 2005 when his mother, Nermin Erbakan, died. He later got his master's degree from Başkent University. He completed his doctorate in management and organization at the same university.

== Political career ==
=== Virtue Party and Felicity Party ===
By 1999, Erbakan was a member of the Virtue Party. After its dissolution by the Constitutional Court of Turkey, the Felicity Party was founded, which Erbakan joined. He was on the Board of the Headquarters Youth Branch, remaining in the party until the 5th Ordinary Congress in 2014.

=== New Welfare Party ===
On November 23, 2018, he founded the New Welfare Party (YRP) again and was elected as its chairman. The New Welfare Party was organized in 81 provinces and 800 districts in Turkey and its work continues. As YRP Chairman on 17 November 2019, he organized one of the largest congresses in Turkish political history with the participation of 45,000 people. In addition, the first rally was held on February 9, 2020, in the area of Sakarya Democracy Square, as the Jerusalem Rally.

He announced his candidacy for the 2023 Turkish presidential election, but later dropped out of the race and endorsed incumbent president Recep Tayyip Erdoğan. In 2025, he announced his candidacy for the 2028 Turkish presidential election.

== Political positions ==
Erbakan is against LGBT rights, and has declared that LGBT people are "a perversion banned in every religion". Erbakan also aims to lift a law that seems to be protecting women and children against domestic violence, but also includes sections against the core family union, calling it "fascist and feminist". He went popular for his speech where he was against the imprisonment of men who were married when they were below 18 in Anataolia years ago.

=== Education ===
He is in favor of spiritual education and opposed to the teaching of evolution theory in Turkish schools as it would make them either members of the Kurdistan Workers Party (PKK) or communists since the PKK also teaches this.

=== COVID-19 ===
Erbakan was a supporter of the anti-vax movement during the COVID-19 pandemic in Turkey. He claimed COVID-19 vaccines could lead to people giving birth to "half-human, half-monkey" children. During the early days on the pandemic, Erbakan suggested that "Zionism could very well be behind the coronavirus."

=== Foreign policy ===
Erbakan supports closing the Kürecik Radar Station, operated by NATO, saying the "intelligence shared with the US and the UK is directly used to protect Israel".

== Personal life ==
Erbakan is fluent in English. He is married and has two children.
