= Recai Kutan =

Turkish politician (1930–2024)

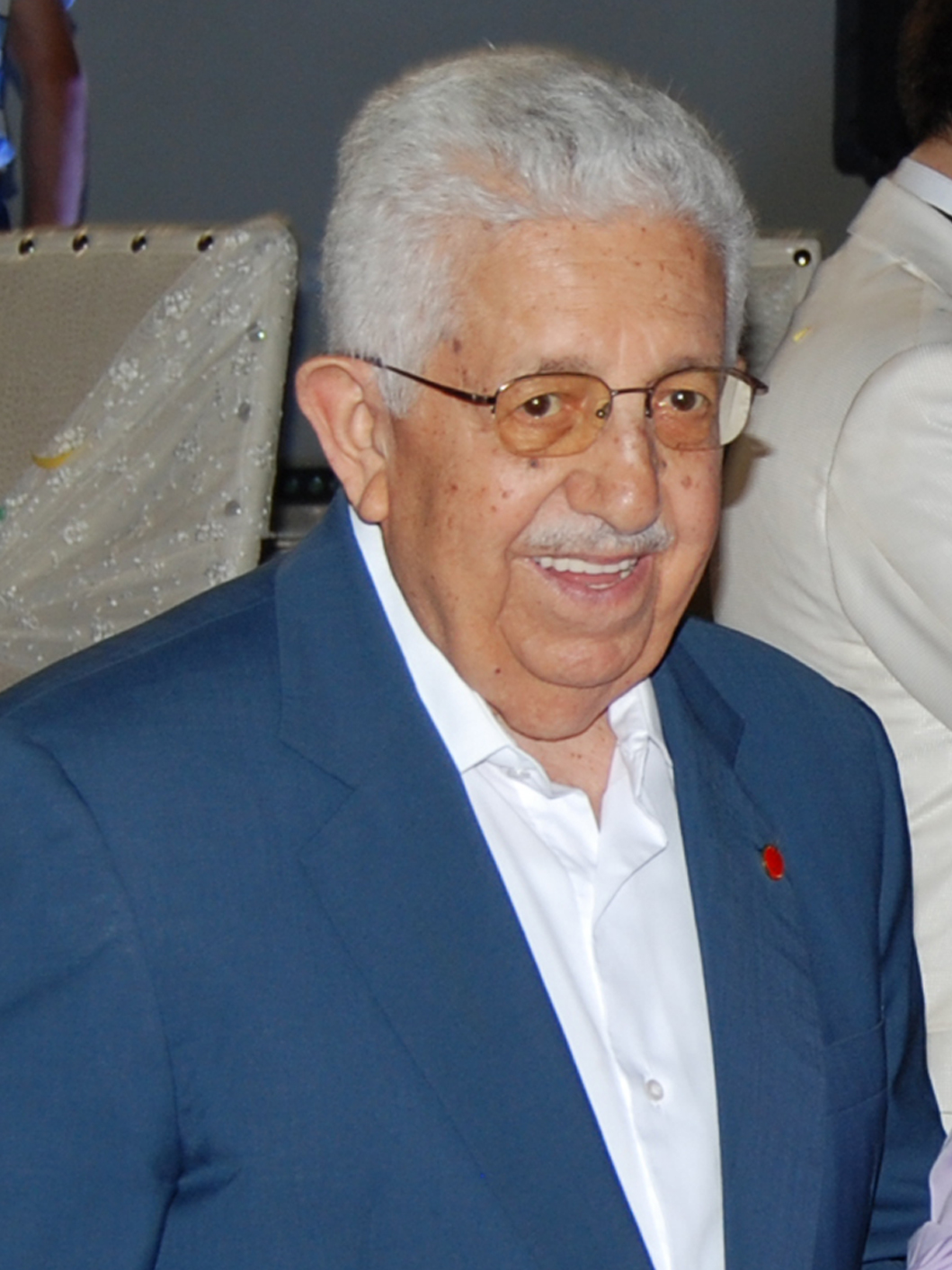
- Kutan in 2009

Leader of the Felicity Party
- In office 20 July 2001 – 11 May 2003
- Preceded by: Party established
- Succeeded by: Necmettin Erbakan
- In office 8 April 2006 – 26 October 2008; Acting: 30 January 2006 – 26 October 2008
- Preceded by: Necmettin Erbakan
- Succeeded by: Numan Kurtulmuş

Leader of the Virtue Party
- In office 17 December 1997 – 22 June 2001
- Preceded by: Party established
- Succeeded by: Party abolished

Minister of Energy and Natural Resources
- In office 28 June 1996 – 30 June 1997
- Prime Minister: Necmettin Erbakan
- Preceded by: Hüsnü Doğan
- Succeeded by: Cumhur Ersümer

Minister of Construction and Settlement
- In office 21 July 1977 – 5 January 1978
- Prime Minister: Süleyman Demirel
- Preceded by: Erol Tuncer
- Succeeded by: Ahmet Karaaslan

Personal details
- Born: 5 April 1930 Darende, Turkey
- Died: 7 October 2024 (aged 94) Ankara, Turkey

Mehmet Recai Kutan (5 April 1930 – 7 October 2024) was a Turkish politician who was the leader of the Felicity Party (SP).

== Life and career ==
Kutan graduated from ITU obtaining a degree in civil engineering in 1952. Until 1973, he worked as an engineer in various projects including the GAP. His political career started 1973 in MSP and after 1983 he served in Welfare Party. He was minister of energy in 1996 in a coalition led by Refah Party.

At the 3rd party congress held on 26 October 2008 in Ankara, he did not run for re-election as the leader of the SP, and was succeeded by Numan Kurtulmuş in the post. He was a member of the İsmailağa, a Turkish sufistic community of the Naqshbandi tariqah.

Kutan died on 7 October 2024, at the age of 94. He was buried at Karşıyaka Cemetery in Ankara.

== Sources ==
- Biography (in Turkish)

Political offices
Preceded by Erol Tuncer	Minister of Public Works and Housing of Turkey; 1977–1978	Succeeded by Ahmet Karaaslan
Preceded by Hüsnü Doğan	Minister of Energy and Natural Resources of Turkey; 1996–1997	Succeeded by Cumhur Ersümer
Party political offices
Preceded by İsmail Alptekin	Leader of the Virtue Party (FP); 1998–2001	Succeeded by banned
Preceded by newly founded	Leader of the Felicity Party (SP); 20 July 2001 – 11 May 2003	Succeeded by Necmettin Erbakan
Preceded by Necmettin Erbakan	Leader of the Felicity Party (SP); 9 April 2006 – 26 October 2008	Succeeded by Numan Kurtulmuş
