= Millî Gazete =

Turkish daily newspaper

- Type: Daily newspaper
- Owner: Yeni Neşriyat A.Ş
- Founded: 12 January 1973
- Political alignment: Millî Görüş
- Language: Turkish
- Headquarters: Cağaloğlu, Laleli, Fatih, Eminönü, Istanbul, Turkey
- Circulation: 51,000 (September 2011)
- Website: www.milligazete.com.tr

Millî Gazete ("National Newspaper") is an Islamist Turkish daily newspaper that is aligned to the Milli Görüş ideology. It was founded in 1973, and the first issue appeared on 12 January 1973. The paper was aligned with the Islamist National Salvation Party (Millî Selâmet Partisi). It publishes a German edition in Germany, which is linked with the Millî Görüş organization. Following the military coup on 12 September 1980 Millî Gazete was temporarily closed four times by the authorities.
