= Cumhur Ersümer =

Turkish politician

Turkish Deputy Prime Minister
- In office 28 June 1999 – 12 July 2000
- Preceded by: Hikmet Uluğbay
- Succeeded by: Mesut Yılmaz

Minister of Energy and Natural Resources of Turkey
- In office 30 June 1997 – 11 January 1999
- Preceded by: Recai Kutan
- Succeeded by: Ahmet Ziya Aktaş

Personal details
- Born: 1952 (age 73–74) Çanakkale, Turkey

Mustafa Cumhur Ersümer (born 1952, in Çanakkale) is a Turkish politician.

He graduated from Istanbul University Faculty of Law. He served as a freelance lawyer, member of the Radio and Television Supreme Council, 18th, 20th and 21st term Çanakkale deputy, Minister of Energy and Natural Resources and Deputy Prime Minister. He was referred to the Supreme Court by the TGNA on July 13, 2004 on the grounds that "He made the agreements and practices against Turkey in the Energy and Natural Gas Agreements, he committed mischief in the purchase and sale of the state, wrong and irregular energy policies applied and abused his office. The Supreme Court sentenced him to 1 year and 8 months imprisonment on 27 July 2007 and delayed his sentence.
