= Metin Yüksel =

Turkish Islamist activist

Metin Yüksel (July 17, 1958 – February 23, 1979) was a Turkish political and social Islamist activist. One of the main leaders of Turkey's Islamic movement during the 1970s, he also was a member of the Raiders Organization.

== Early life ==
Yüksel was born on July 17, 1958, in the eastern Anatolian city of Bitlis. Little is known about his early life outside of his Kurdish family's religious devotion, a characteristic that Yüksel would carry with him throughout his short life. His father, Sadreddin Yüksel, born in Konya was a well-known religious scholar, famous amongst Turkey's religious people. His brother, Edip Yüksel, is US-based lawyer who has become known for converting to Quranism and advocating Rashad Khalifa's teachings (for which he was rejected by Metin and called a murtad by their father).

== Activism ==
Growing up during the turbulent 1960s and 1970s, when the deadly political conflict took place in Turkey, Yüksel began his activism at an early age. Inspired by the ideas of his father and others, Yüksel quickly became active in the burgeoning Islamist movements that emerged in the early 1950s, following the onset of the multi-party period in 1945.

== Assassination ==
On February 23, 1979, Yüksel was shot and killed in the courtyard of Istanbul's Fatih Mosque by Grey Wolves loyal to the MHP after getting into a short-term verbal argument with a group of Idealists who had threatened him. He was 20 years old.

== Legacy ==
Following his assassination, Yüksel became a martyr among Turkey's Islamist factions. His assassination led supporters to declare February as Şehit ("Martyr") month.

Every year on the anniversary of his death, supporters make pilgrimage to the spot where he was assassinated, in the yard of Fatih Mosque. It is common for them to hoist banners remembering him and paint red the spot where he fell.

== See also ==
- List of assassinated people from Turkey
