= Cem Seymen =

Turkish journalist

- Born: Ürgüp, Nevşehir, Turkey
- Education: Bilkent University; City University of New York; New York University; Beykent University
- Occupation(s): Economist, journalist, TV presenter
- Years active: 2010–present
- Employer(s): ABC, CBS, NBC, CNN Türk

Cem Seymen is a Turkish journalist, TV presenter and economist. Seymen, son of Ürgüp mayor and 18th-term Nevşehir MP Cemal Seymen, was born in the town of Ürgüp. He completed his primary and secondary school in Ürgüp and his high school in Istanbul and continued his education in Bilkent University in the tourism management department. Seymen, who had been working in the tourism sector for a while, went to the United States to continue his education. He lived in New York City between 1993 and 1999. Seymen studied television broadcasting at New York University and political economy at City University of New York, and attended professional seminars on ABC, CBS and NBC televisions. After completing his education in the USA, he worked as an economy reporter on BRT television and presented the program called Hayatın Renkleri. Seymen is also a journalist. He later took the university exams again and enrolled in the Beykent University, English Language and Literature Department with a scholarship. He earned a master's degree with his work "Traces of Colonialism in Joseph Conrad Novels".

Cem Seymen presents economy-finance news on CNN Türk and talks about the fields of science, technology, education, innovation, production, agriculture and animal husbandry in the program Para Dedektifi. He has also hosted programs and lectures in various locations and has been invited as a speaker to conferences on communication, agriculture and economics at different universities. Due to the popularity of his program Para Dedektifi on CNN Türk, he has been a guest at some symposia.

He also worked as an economy editor on CNN Türk for a while.

== Awards ==
- "Communication Academics – Media and Communication Awards", Maltepe University
- "Local Journalism Award", TMMOB Chamber of Urban Planners (ŞPO)
- "Chamber of Agricultural Engineers Press Award"
- "Green Globe Award", Çevre College
- "Economy Press Success Awards" (Para Dedektifi)
- "Most Environmentally Friendly TV Programmer of the Year Award"
- "Bülent Yardımcı Special Award", Economy Journalists' Association (Para Dedektifi)
- "Media Award", 2017 Necmettin Erbakan Awards
