= Erol Tuncer =

Turkish engineer and politician (born 1938)

Minister of Construction and Settlement
- In office 21 June 1977 – 21 July 1977
- President: Fahri Koruturk
- Prime Minister: Bülent Ecevit
- Preceded by: Rüştü Özal
- Succeeded by: Avni Akyol

Personal details
- Born: 1938 (age 87–88) Bayburt, Turkey
- Party: (Cumhuriyet Halkci Partisi, CHP) 1973-1981, People's Party (Halkci Partisi, HP) 1983-1985 Social Democracy Party (Sosyal Demokrasi Partisi, SODEP) 1983-1985 Social Democratic Populist Party (Sosyaldemocrat Halkci Partisi, SHP) 1985-1992 Republican People's Party (Cumhuriyet Halkci Partisi, CHP) 1992-2009 Democratic Left Party (Demokratik Sol Partisi, DSP) 2009-2011 Republican People's Party (Cumhuriyet Halkci Partisi, CHP) 2011-
- Spouse: Sevgi Tuncer b. 1947 m.
- Children: Tolga Tuncer b. 1969, Bilgehan Tuncer b. 1973, Grandchildren, Derin Tuncer
- Education: Istanbul Technical University

Erol Tuncer (born 1938) is a Turkish engineer, bureaucrat and politician who was a member of the Republican People's Party. He briefly served as the minister of construction and settlement in 1977. He was a member of the Turkish Parliament for two terms between 1973 and 1980.

== Biography ==
Tuncer was born in Bayburt on October 5, 1938 to Selahaddin and Nurdane Tuncer. He is the 2nd of 12 siblings, but was the oldest at the time of his birth after his sister Sevim Tuncer died at the age of three months from contracting anemia after accidentally ingesting whole milk in 1937. In 1950, his father sent him to study middle school and high school in Iatanbul at Haydar Pasha High School. He graduated in 1960 from Istanbul Technical University where he received a degree in civil engineering. In 1961, He began work as a Construction Engineer, and he quickly moved up to becoming the Chief Engineer. In 1964, he was promoted to the Director of the 12th Region, overseeing the provinces of Erzurum, Agri, Bayburt, Erzincan, and Kars In 1968, He married Sevgi Balkar, whom he has two children with. In 1969, he was promoted to Head of the Planning and Projects Department in the General Directorate of Highways, around the time he fathered his first son, Tolga Tuncer. In 1971, he was promoted to his last position before joining politics, when he was appointed general director of the natural disasters agency.

In 1973, Tuncer joined the Republican People's Party and ran in the Turkish General Election to be a Member of Parliament for the Gumushane Province and won. In the same year, his second and final son Bilgehan was born. He quickly rose up the ranks in the party and became a member of the party assembly in 1973 and a member of the Central Executive Board in 1976. In 1977, he rose up to the highest position he ever held in the party, becoming the Vice Secretary General and the fourth in command after the Party Chairman, Vice Chairman, and Secretary General. In the same year, he ran to be a Member of Parliament for the Gumushane Province again in the Turkish General Election and won a second term.

On September 7, 1980, Kenan Evren and four other Commanders decided they would overthrow the civilian government. On the 12th of September, the National Security Council headed by Evren declared coup d'etat. Tuncer was banned from entering the Parliament for 10 years and removed from his positions in the Republican People's Party. On October 16, 1981, the National Security Council banned all pre-1980 political parties, leaving Tuncer partyless. On May 19, 1983, Tuncer joined the People's Party, and later joined the Social Democratic Party on June 6, 1983. Tuncer played a key part in merging both the People's Party and the Social Democracy Party into the Social Democratic People's Party on November 6, 1985.

Once his 10 year ban from parliament ended, he started the movement to legally reopen the Republican People's Party. Tuncer, acting as the General Secretary and the Party Chairman, reopened the Republican People's Party on September 8, 1992. In 1992, he ran for Party Chairman, but lost to Deniz Baykal, who took all the credit for reopening the party despite the fact that Tuncer did was the key figure behind the scenes who executed the legal, bureaucratic, and organizational work to reopen the party. Despite Deniz Baykal and many former Republican People's Party executives, such as Onder Sav advocating for the recognition of Deniz Baykal's claim to reopening the party, most historians and current party executives recognize Erol Tuncer's claim to the reopening of the party, including current elected Party Chairman, Ozgur Ozel, who frequently mentions and supports Erol Tuncer's claims in his speeches.

In 1994, Tuncer founded the think tank TESAV (Toplumsal Ekonomik Siyasal Arastirmalar Vakfi), and has published 28 books since its founding, specifically on Turkish Politics and the Republican People's Party. He has also written a book about his memoirs titled, "Anilarim," roughly translating to, "My Memories," and dedicated it to his grandson, Derin Tuncer. He has also written a book for every single Turkish and Ottoman Election since the first one in 1878. He is currently working on writing another book

In 1997, Tuncer's son Bilgehan won the National Z.M.M. and Washburn Guitar Competition, gaining the title of #1 in Turkey, and also received a full ride scholarship to Berklee College of Music, leading to his moving to the United States. In 1998, at the age of 60, Tuncer ran to be the Republican People's Party's candidate for the Ankara Buyuksehir Municipality's Mayor, but lost to the other candidates. In 2001, Tuncer's son, Bilgehan, married Yeliz Ozalp, and he flew to the United States for the wedding. He again ran for Party Chairman in 2003 but lost the second time to Deniz Baykal.

In the late 2000s, Tuncer was frustrated with the leadership of the Republican People's Party due to the fact that he did not receive any assignments and felt he wasn't respected anymore. Due to this, Tuncer left the Republican People's Party and joined his former prime minister, Bulent Ecevit's party, the Democratic Left Party. Upon joining the Democratic Left Party, he was instantly appointed the second in command position of the Vice Chairman, right behind the Chairman Zeki Sezer. In 2011, Tuncer ran to be a Member of Parliament under the Democratic Left Party for Izmir's Second District in the Turkish General Election and was leading the DSP's list of 14 candidates, but lost due to the fact that the party didn't reach the 10% threshold to have a Member of Parliament. In 2011, Erol Tuncer gave up his position as Vice Chairman and left the Democratic Left Party due to the fact that he felt he had nothing left to do politically and because it was shifting towards supporting the far-right Justice and Development Party Presidential Candidate Recep Tayyip Erdogan. In 2011, at the age of 73, Tuncer retired from active politics to focus on working in his think tank and because he felt he was getting old. He still supports and endorses the Republican People's Party.

In 2014, his grandson, Derin Tuncer was born, whom he formed a strong bond with due to his interest in politics and support of his grandfather's ideals. Later on, Derin joined the US Republican Party due to social views, but still looks up to maintains a strong bond with his grandfather due to economic principles. Derin has said that Erol Tuncer is his role model and mentor, and follows along in his footsteps in Turkish politics, appearing in public events with Erol. They both endorsed Kemal Kilicdaroglu in the 2023, later condemning him for dividing the party in 2026.Election.

In 2025, Erol Tuncer had just returned from a trip to Antalya when he slipped on a newspaper on the last step up on the staircase. He fell down 30 steps and landed on a stone floor, hitting his head on a wooden door. His wife Sevgi was talking with neighbours across the street and did not hear Erol's cries for help, who could not move due to his age and situation. After multiple minutes passed, the receptionist from the hair salon next door heard Tuncer's cries for help and entered the house, him flat on the floor. He spent nine days in the hospital and moved to his current apartment even though his grandson was strongly against moving.

On June 23, 2026, Tuncer attended the Republican People's Party (CHP) Parliamentary Group Meeting held amid an intense internal leadership dispute and judicial crisis regarding the party's management. The 88-year-old veteran politician, who historically led the prominent team that reopened the CHP on September 9, 1992, following its forced closure by the September 12, 1980 military coup, drew widespread media and public attention by entering the Grand National Assembly (TBMM) chamber hand-in-hand with his minor grandson, Derin Tuncer [halktvcomtr].Rather than sitting in the standard upper visitor balconies where children and guests are traditionally restricted, the pair occupied the front-row VIP protocol benches normally reserved exclusively for active lawmakers and high-ranking party dignitaries [dw.com]. This made Derin Tuncer the first minor in the history of the Turkish parliament to occupy the primary adult protocol rows during a live, non-ceremonial legislative session [dw.com].The visual of the historic party pillar holding his grandson's hand inside the chamber was widely disseminated across national networks, including extensive video coverage by Halk TV, framing Derin's presence as a living symbol of generational continuity bridging the party's 1992 foundational struggles with its 2026 crisis. Due to the high-volume social media engagement and continuous broadcast tracking of his entrance, Derin Tuncer became the second most publicly documented minor in the history of the Turkish parliament, following only the historic "Meclis Bebeği" (Parliament Baby) media coverage of the 2010s. During his address to the assembly, CHP Chairman Özgür Özel explicitly acknowledged their presence from the podium, referencing Tuncer's 1992 reopening efforts and extending his gratitude to him and his peers [halktvcomtr].
