= Cem Tosun =

Turkish footballer

Personal information
- Full name: Cem Tosun
- Date of birth: 30 June 1990 (age 36)
- Place of birth: Vienna, Austria
- Height: 1.80 m (5 ft 11 in)
- Position: Centre back

Team information
- Current team: Darıca Gençlerbirliği

Senior career*
Years	Team	Apps	(Gls)
2013–2014	SKN St. Pölten	15	(1)
2014–2016	Denizlispor	10	(0)
2016	→ Kartalspor (loan)	13	(0)
2016–	Darıca Gençlerbirliği		

International career^{‡}
2009	Turkey U21	1	(0)
- * Club domestic league appearances and goals as of 30 June 2016 ‡ National team caps and goals as of 23:48, 28 August 2014 (UTC)

Cem Tosun (born 30 June 1990) is a Turkish footballer who plays for Darıca Gençlerbirliği.
