= Koyunlu, Niğde =

Koyunlu
- Village
- Location within Turkey Location within Turkey Central Anatolia
- Coordinates: 37°58′55″N 34°35′34″E
- Country: Turkey
- Province: Niğde
- District: Niğde
- Elevation: 1,458 m (4,783 ft)
- Population (2022): 658
- Time zone: UTC+3 (TRT)
- Postal code: 51000
- Area code: 0388

Koyunlu is a village in Niğde District of Niğde Province, Turkey. Its population is 658 (2022). Before the 2013 reorganisation, it was a town (belde).

Its distance to Niğde is 8 kilometres (5.0 mi). Its elevation is 1,458 metres (4,783 ft)

The town was founded 600 years ago. The former name of the town was Adırmusun. According to legend the name of the town refers to a certain Adil who founded the town.

Main economic activities are agriculture and animal husbandry. (In fact the current name of the town refers to sheep) Previously Koyunlu produced hand-woven carpets. In 1972, the Koyunlu carpet factory was founded by Birko, which was owned by Koyunlu people in 1972.
