= Cem Bayoğlu =

Turkish photographer and visual artist

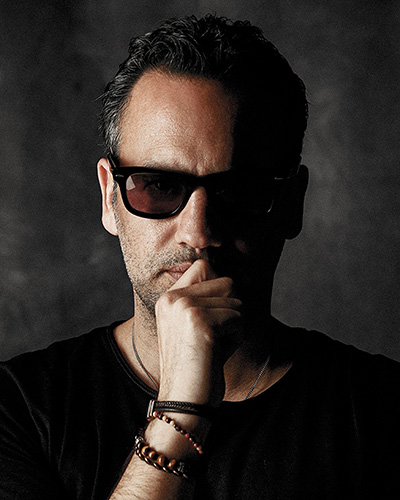
- Born: Özgür Cem Bayoğlu; 17 February 1977; İzmir, Turkey
- Citizenship: Turkish
- Occupations: Photographer, Visual Artist
- Years active: 2011-today
- Spouse: Burcu Bayoğlu (m. 2015)
- Children: Lila Bayoğlu
- Website: www.cembayoglu.com

Cem Bayoğlu (born February 17, 1977) is a Turkish photographer and visual artist.

He is known for Turkish celebrity portraits, and fine art photography works utilising unique lights and color techniques.

== Early life and photography career ==
He was born and raised in İzmir, Turkey in 1977. He completed his studies at Electricity Department of Dokuz Eylül University Izmir Vocational School in 1998. He played guitar with a band in touristic places between 1994 and 2000. After graduation he started working in his family business in industry sector. In 2001, he traveled to Australia to learn English and he started photography as a hobby. He pursued his interest in both photography and music in his spare times and in 2006, he made an album titled Teselli consisting of his compositions.

In 2011, he started his professional photography career by opening his first photography studio in İzmir. Since then, he involved in several international awareness projects with his photographs. In 2013, he supported One Billion Rising campaign of American feminist and drama writer Eve Ensler by creating a series of photographs inspired by stories of domestic violence. The series he created by using a black and white palette highlighted by select reds and yellows is called One Billion Suffers and it included 14 photographs to be deleted totally from the internet after 14 days being exhibited at a Facebook virtual exhibition. Cem's One Billion Suffers series was regarded as a powerful tool for creating awareness and influencing positive change in society. Same year, some of his works exhibited at the group exhibition called What Color Is Abuse, organized by activist artist Joe Stein in Duren, Germany. One of his works featured on the cover of the Weisser Ring magazine.

Bayoglu produced music videos and commercial photos for well-established brands in Turkey since 2013. His work for the Ten Thousand Warm Hearts campaign launched as a part of the tenth anniversary celebrations of Forum Bornova Mall in 2017, received ICSC Solal Marketing Award in the Corporate Social Responsibility category.

In 2019, he exhibited his photos from "Sinful Colors" and "Berceste" series at Maison et Objet fair in Paris. In his photos at the Sinful Colors series, the titular description, "sinful" was conveyed with the facial expressions of the models, who are captured in provocative states whether mid-air or underwater.

In 2022 he published his book "50 Yolcu" (50 Passengers) in which he collected 50 photos of celebrities taken between 2016 and 2021 with an antique suitcase and their words on their life journeys.

== Works ==
Fine Art Photography Series

- Sinful Colors
- Berceste
- Underland

Music Album Cover photos

- Teoman – Eski Bir Rüya Uğruna
- İskender Paydaş – Zamansız Şarkılar II
- Ferman Akgül – İstemem Söz Sevmeni
- Pamela Spence – Aslanlar Gibi
- Cenk Eren – Repertuvar Tanju Okan Şarkıları
- Cenk Eren – Repertuvar Selda Bağcan Şarkıları
- Volga Tamöz – No2
- Grup Mecaz – Heybe
- Gamze Matracı – Balkantoloji
- Yılmaz Kömürcü – Yeni Aşk
- Yıldız Hazel – Seve Seve
- Gizli Özne – Yalancı Şair

Book Cover photos

- Hüseyin Mutlu Akpınar – Bir Baskan Bir Sehir Bir Ask
- Ferman Akgül – Osmanli Cadisi Tirnova (inner cover photos)

Music Videos and Commercials (directed by Bayoğlu)

- Ferman Akgül – İstemem Söz Sevmeni
- Yıldız Hazel – Seve Seve
- Kenan Doğulu – Swings With Blue In Green Big Band Concert
- Folkart – October,29 Karsiyaka-Göztepe Friendship Commercial Film
- Forum Bornova Mall – Ten Thousand Warm Hearts

Photography Exhibitions

- One Billion Suffers (Personal exhibition about violence against women consisting of fourteen photographs)
- What Color Is Abuse (International Group exkhibition about violence against women)
