= Virtue Party =

Virtue Party Fazilet Partisi
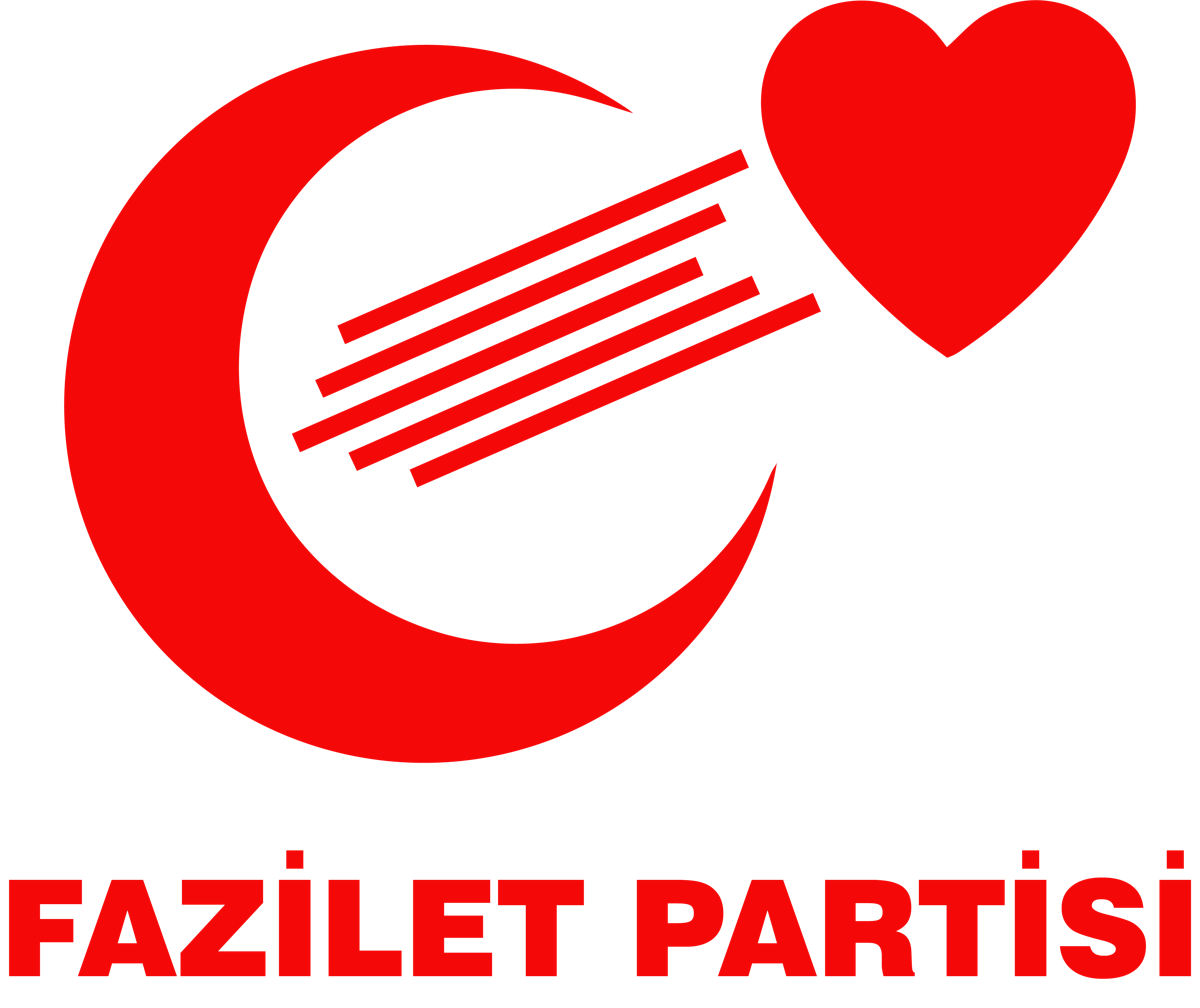
- Leader: Recai Kutan
- Founder: İsmail Alptekin
- Founded: 17 December 1997
- Banned: 22 June 2001
- Preceded by: Welfare Party (RP)
- Succeeded by: Felicity Party (SP); Justice and Development Party (AKP)
- Headquarters: Ankara
- Ideology: Millî Görüş; Islamism; Pan-Islamism; Social conservatism
- Political position: Far-right
- Religion: Sunni Islam
- Colors: Red (official); Hot pink (customary)

Virtue Party (Turkish: Fazilet Partisi, FP) was an Islamist political party established on 17 December 1997 in Turkey. It was found unconstitutional by the Constitutional Court and then banned on 22 June 2001 for violating the secularist articles of the Constitution. After the party's ban, the party MPs founded two sections of parties: reformist Justice and Development Party (AKP), headed by Recep Tayyip Erdoğan, and traditionalist Felicity Party (SP), headed by Recai Kutan.

== History ==
Founders of the Virtue Party were also active members of the National Order Party (MNP), National Salvation Party (MSP) and Welfare Party (RP).

Merve Kavakçı, the female elected as the MP who was banned from swearing her oath in Turkish Grand National Assembly because she wore a headscarf, was a Virtue Party member.

Former party chairman Recai Kutan submitted a case on behalf of the party to the European Court of Human Rights, alleging infringement of Articles 10 (freedom of expression) and 11 (freedom of association) among others. In December 2005, Kutan told the court that he intended to withdraw the application, possibly influenced by the unfavourable result in Leyla Şahin v. Turkey (2004), and the court struck out the case.

== See also ==
- List of Islamic political parties
