= National Order Party =

Defunct Islamist party in Turkey

National Order Party Millî Nizam Partisi
- Leader: Necmettin Erbakan
- Founder: Necmettin Erbakan
- Founded: 26 January 1970; 56 years ago
- Banned: 20 May 1971; 54 years ago
- Split from: Justice Party
- Succeeded by: National Salvation Party
- Headquarters: Ankara, Turkey
- Ideology: Millî Görüş; Islamism; Pan-Islamism; Social conservatism Desecularization; Economic nationalism Statism; Factions: Monarchism; Reactionism
- Political position: Far-right
- Religion: Sunni Islam

National Order Party (Millî Nizam Partisi, MNP) was an Islamist political party in Turkey, which adopted the Millî Görüş ideology. It was the first political party of the Millî Görüş movement and also the first Islamist political party in Turkey.

== History ==
The MNP was founded on 26 January 1970 by Necmettin Erbakan. The Naqshbandi leader Mehmet Zahit Kotku was instrumental in its establishment. It was closed down on 20 May 1971 by the authorities on the grounds, that it violated the Constitution, specifically the articles dealing with secularism.

It was succeeded by the National Salvation Party (MSP) established in October 1972.

== See also ==
- List of Islamic political parties
