= 2026 Turkish investment fund scandal =

Financial and political scandal in Turkey

2026 Turkish investment fund scandal, also known as the "2026 Turkish investment fund crisis" is an ongoing political and financial scandal that began in mid-September, when several Turkish investment funds could not meet redemption request from investors. The Capital Markets Board (SPK) subsequently ordered the liquidation of 131 funds run by seven asset managers. The funds reportedly held approximately $17 billion in assets, affecting about 455,000 investors. Officials have described the structure as a "Ponzi-like" scheme.

The scandal has expanded into a major political corruption investigation involving figures connected to Turkey's ruling Justice and Development Party (AKP) and senior officials within the country's financial institutions. As of 14 November 2026, the investigation included 464 suspects, 123 of whom had been remanded in custody, including deputy chair of ruling AKP for share trading, head of the Turkish Stock Exchange and former deputy chair of SPK, the latter two on suspicion of bribery.

The index fell roughly 35% in September, the total market capitalization of publicly traded companies on the stock exchange fell from $479 billion to $306 billion in just two months, causing loss of $173 billion.

== Background ==
Turkey's central bank kept monetary policy tight in order to reduce inflation and encourages savings in lira-denominated assets, which increased demands for funds promising returns above inflation and deposit rates. Portfolio management industry assets rose form about US$246 billion in August 2025 to about August 2026, according to SPK date cited by Reuters. Some funds became concentrated in a single stock or asset or had very few investors. Some held recently listed small capitalisation shares with low free float, where limited liquidity allows price to move sharply and so lifted the funds' reported daily returns.

Two asset managers, Tera Portföy and Pusula Portföy, expanded most rapidly. Between August 2025 and August 2026 Tera's assets under management rose more than ten times to US$14.3 billion, and Pusula's thirteen times to US$13.2 billion, making them the sixth and eighth largest portfolio managers in Turkey. Tera's TLY hedge fund reported a cumulative return of over 15,000% in Lira terms by September 2026. It was open in a wider investor base in July and reached more than 100,000 investors and US$5 billion in assets, making it the largest of the funds later liquidated.

== Early warnings ==
In November 2025 Finance Minister Mehmet Şimşek said that manipulation was being carried out "particularly through certain funds" and that regulatory gaps would be addressed. The SPK chairman at the time Ömer Gönül, warned that managers using funds to circumvent rules could lose their license. On 28 August 2026 the SPK tightened rules on portfolio concentration, related party transactions, valuation methods and hedge fund operation. According to Reuters, the funds continued to grow during this period.

== Collapse ==
In mid-September 2026, funds holding large position in stocks with limited free float struggled to meet redemption requests. Tera Portföy reported difficulties paying investors who wished to withdraw from two funds, and Pusula Portföy later reported similar problems. The SPK suspended trading in the affected managers' funds on the Turkish Electronic Fund Trading Platform (TEFAS) and ordered the liquidation of 131 funds, with a combined volume of about US$18.3 billion. The regulator said that price movement in low-float stocks held by some funds could not be explained.

== Government response ==
On 29 September 2026 President Recep Tayyip Erdoğan met his economic team and regulators and announced a Fund Coordination Council under Vice President Cevdet Yılmaz to speed up liquidation and payments to investors. The State Audit Institution (DDK) was instructed to examine the funds and the supervisory. The SPK said liquidation would take up to six months. Investors with net holdings below 1 million lira were to be repaid in full, and those with larger holdings were to receive an interim payment of 1 million Lira.

The Savings Deposit Insurance Fund (TMSF) opened accounts for people willing to return what authorities termed as "excessive gains". By 3 November Gürlek said that about 30 billion Lira in money, real estate and shares had been returned through this mechanism. The government also said it was preparing new administrative and criminal rules against market manipulation. Erdoğan declared the crisis under control in mid-October and on 5 November said that some of the people implicated were ones he had not expected.

== Investigation ==
The investigation is led by the Istanbul Chief Public Prosecutor's Office. On 9 October Gürlek said that 214 people and companies had each made more than 100 million lira in profits from funds managed by Tera, Pusula and Hedef Portföy, totaling about 187.65 billion lira (more than US$3.7 billion). He said that their identities have been passed to the TMSF, which began notifying them to return the money. Investigators focused in particular on investors who sold their holdings between 13 and 16 September 2026, which Gürlek said they had done after receiving advanced information. The number of suspects rose from 217, with 56 in partial detention, in early October, to 433 on 3 November 2026, with 112 under arrest, 186 under judicial supervision and warrants out for 38 fugitives. Assets of 359 individual and 111 entities have been frozen or restricted.

The same day detention orders were issued for 6 people, including 4 former SPK officials, a serving official of the Banking Regulation and Supervision Agency (BDDK), and a Tera Holding executive. Turkish Stock Exchange (Borsa Istanbul) general manager Korkmaz Enes Ergun, taken into custody on 31 October 2026, was arrested on bribery allegations. Umut Güner, a shareholder in the business daily ''Dünya'', was detained on 1 November and released under house arrest and travel ban.

On 7 November 2026, four suspects, including former Capital Markets Board (SPK) deputy chairman Enver Usca, were taken into custody.

On 11 November 2026, three more suspects were arrested as part of the investigation. Those arrested included Yunus Arıncı, former General Manager of Takasbank; Ömer Murat Gülkan, Chairman of OMG Capital Advisors; and Ali Paslı, a founding partner of Adil Participation Bank (Adil Katılım Bankası). Four other suspects detained in the same operation:Enver Çevik, Chairman of Lydia Holding; Nureddin Çevik, Chairman of Ruzy Madencilik; Kemal Akkaya, Chairman of Bulls Yatırım; and Ayhan Yazkan, Chairman of Maygold Otomotiv—were released subject to judicial supervision, including house arrest. The latest arrests brought the total number of people remanded in custody to 123.

== Political fallout ==
=== Fatma Betül Sayan Kaya ===
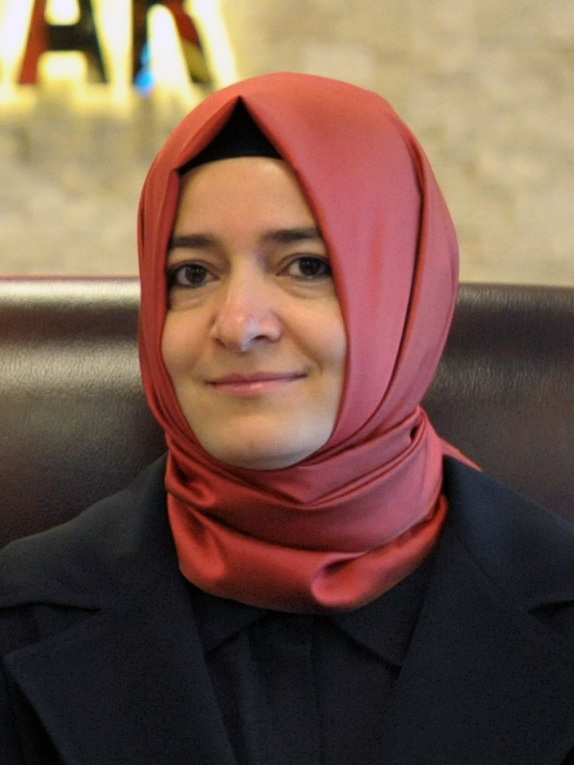
Fatma Betül Sayan Kaya, Deputy Chair of the AKP and former Minister of Family and Social Services.

Kaya, who served as minister of family and social policies from 2016 to 2018, resigned from her AKP posts on September after a opposition politician alleged that she and her husband had profited substantially from trading shares of Ozata Denizcilik before the turmoil. The main opposition party has alleged that she received 2.17 billion lira after investing 163 million lira in one of the funds. The couple had denied the allegations, but according to media reports, transferred some of the profits to an account designated by banking regulators. On 5 November 2026 Kaya was taken into custody waiting trial on charges of membership in a criminal organization and violating the Capital Market Law, according to the state run Anadolu Agency, her husband was released under a reporting requirement. On 9 November 2026, during questioning in connection with the financial investigation, she reportedly declared that she was a homemaker with monthly income of 500,000 Liras (about 10,000 USD).

=== Opposition ===
Opposition politicians have called for transparency over who profited and have alleged that current and former ministers are implicated. Erdoğan has said that those responsible would be held accountable, including within his own party.

== Media ==
On 16 October, the broadcasting regulator RTÜK fined two television channels over coverage questioning the connections of government figures to the scandal.

== Economic impact ==
Besides the fall in the stock market, the changes to the composition of the Borsa Istanbul index removed stocks linked to the crisis. Analysts at JPMorgan said the turmoil posed "meaningful downside risks" to Turkey's 2026 growth forecast of 3%. The total loses to investors remains unclear, as many funds hold thinly traded shares that may be difficult to convert into cash.

== See also ==
- Ponzi scheme
