= National Salvation Party =

National Salvation Party Millî Selamet Partisi
- Leader: Necmettin Erbakan
- Founder: Süleyman Arif Emre
- Founded: 11 October 1972
- Banned: 16 October 1981
- Preceded by: National Order Party
- Succeeded by: Welfare Party
- Headquarters: Ankara
- Paramilitary wing: Raiders Organization
- Ideology: Millî Görüş; Islamism; Pan-Islamism; Social conservatism Desecularization; Economic nationalism Statism; Factions: Monarchism; Reactionism
- Political position: Far-right
- Religion: Sunni Islam

The National Salvation Party (Turkish: Millî Selâmet Partisi, MSP) was an Islamist political party in Turkey, founded on 11 October 1972 as the successor of the banned National Order Party (Millî Nizam Partisi, MNP). The party was formed by a core group of working cadres of the now banned MNP, with Süleyman Arif Emre serving as the registered founding chairman. Given the banning of the MNP by the staunchly secular state, only 19 individuals were ready to form the party. Necmettin Erbakan, who took part in the formation of the party, officially joined the party in May 1973, taking over the reins of the party in October 1973. The party grew more popular and in 1973 elections it gained 11.8% of votes, gaining 48 seats in the Turkish Grand National Assembly. In the 1977 elections, it gained 8.56% of votes and won 24 seats. In 1974 it formed the coalition government with the secularist Republican People's Party (CHP) of Bülent Ecevit. MSP was closed down after the 1980 military coup.

Millî Gazete, launched 12 January 1973, was the party's semi-official daily newspaper.

The National Turkish Student Association (Millî Türk Talebe Birliği, MTTB) was the party's youth organization.

The party was succeeded by the Welfare Party (RP), which was founded in 1983.

The founding members of the MSP were: Abdülkerim Doğru, Rasim Hancıoğlu, Hüseyin Kamil Büyüközer, Abdullah Tomba, Sabri Özpala, M. Turhan Akyol, Halit Özgüner, M. Gündüz Sevilgen, Zühtü Öğün, Hüseyin Erdal, Hüseyin Koçak, Hasan Özkeçeci, Osman Nuri Önügören, Mazhar Gürgen Bayatlı, M. Emin Ayak, Mustafa Arafatoğlu, Mustafa Mamati, Abdurrahim Bezci and Sami Baysal.

== See also ==
- List of Islamic political parties
- Raider's Organization
