= İnsan =

Cultural magazine in Istanbul (1938–1943)

- Editor: Hilmi Ziya Ülken
- Categories: Cultural magazine
- Founder: Hilmi Ziya Ülken; Celaleddin Ezine; Sabahattin Eyüboğlu; Muzaffer Şerif; Nurullah Ataç
- First issue: 15 April 1938
- Final issue: August 1943
- Country: Turkey
- Based in: Istanbul
- Language: Turkish

İnsan (Turkish: Man) was a cultural magazine which existed in Istanbul, Turkey, between 1938 and 1942. It was one of the journals started and edited by Hilmi Ziya Ülken who is one of the notable thinkers in Turkey.

== History and profile ==
İnsan was first published on 15 April 1938. Its founders included Hilmi Ziya Ülken, Celaleddin Ezine, Sabahattin Eyüboğlu, Muzaffer Şerif and Nurullah Ataç. The magazine was headquartered in Istanbul. It was edited by Ülken until its closure in August 1943.

== Content and contributors ==
İnsan featured articles on philosophy, sociology, legal topics and literature. It also covered Turkish translation of the work by the following figures: Romain Rolland, Le Corbusier, Jules Romains, Maxim Gorky, John Dewey, Aldous Huxley, Georges Duhamel, Erasmus and André Malraux.

The magazine had a wide range of contributors, including Ahmet Ağaoğlu, Mustafa Şekip Tunç, Pertev Naili Boratav, Bedri Rahmi Eyüboğlu, Sabri Esat Siyavuşgil, Yahya Kemal Beyatlı, Ahmet Muhip Dıranas, Cahit Sıtkı Tarancı, Nusret Kürkçüoğlu, Orhan Veli Kanık, Suut Kemal Yetkin, Cahit Külebi, Hasan İzzettin Dinamo, Sait Faik, Asaf Halet Çelebi, Samim Kocagöz, Cahit Tanyol, Hüsamettin Bozok, Cemil Meriç, Abidin Dino, Burhan Arpad, Rıfat Ilgaz, Salah Birsel, İlhan Berk, Behice Boran, İhsan Devrim, and Ziya Osman Saba.
