= History of European Ideas =

- Discipline: Intellectual history
- Language: English
- Edited by: Richard Whatmore

Publication details
- History: 1980–present
- Publisher: Routledge
- Frequency: 8/year

Standard abbreviations
- ISO 4: Hist. Eur. Ideas

Indexing
- ISSN: 0191-6599 (print); 1873-541X (web)
- LCCN: 81641806
- OCLC no.: 807660216

Links
- Journal homepage; Online access; Online archive

History of European Ideas is a peer-reviewed academic journal covering the intellectual history of Europe from the Renaissance onwards. It was established in 1980 and is published by Routledge. The editor-in-chief is Richard Whatmore (University of St. Andrews).

== Abstracting and indexing ==
The journal is abstracted and indexed in:

- Arts and Humanities Citation Index
- British Humanities Index
- Current Contents/Arts & Humanities
- Historical Abstracts
- MLA International Bibliography
- Philosopher's Index
- Scopus
