= Civilized core =

Civilized Core refers to the four advanced civilizations that emerged during the 1st millennium BC, during the earlier Iron Age after the collapse of the Bronze Age civilizations that preceded them.

A primary characteristic of these civilizations is monocentrism, and together with historical developments such as hereditary rule, it led to a new era of statehood for several civilizations. Accounts also hold that there is evidence that show "uncivilized" periphery has provided technologically superior tools and technologies to the civilized core as demonstrated in the case of the spread of European and North Caucasian shaft-hole axes in advanced civilizations of the Asia Minor. Chinese written sources dating from the latter time frame of the 1st millennium BC also spoke of being "compelled to borrow technology and weapon forms from the "wild peoples" of the steppes and foothills of Central Asia."

These were, in order of emergence, the civilizations of

- The Mediterranean, developing from scattered Phoenician settlements to the emergence of Ancient Greece in the 7th century BCE and culminating in the Hellenistic civilization in the 4th century BCE, by the 3rd century BCE stretching its influence throughout the Mesopotamian and into the Indian sphere.
- Mesopotamia (Babylonia and Assyria), culminating in the unified Achaemenid Empire in the 6th century BCE
- Zhou China, culminating in the Han Empire in the 3rd century BCE
- Iron Age India, the Mahajanapadas culminating in the Maurya Empire in the 4th century BCE

== See also ==
- Axial Age
