= Hilmi Ziya Ülken =

Turkish academic and thinker (1901–1974)

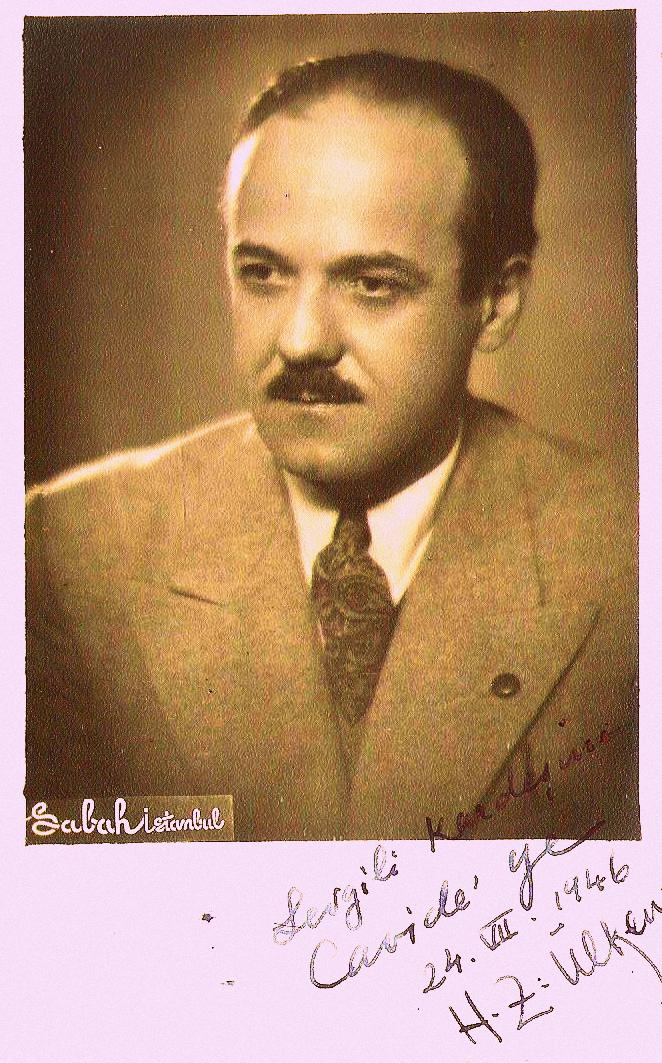
- Ülken in 1946
- Born: 3 October 1901; Constantinople, Ottoman Empire
- Died: 5 June 1974 (aged 72); Istanbul, Turkey
- Resting place: Aşiyan cemetery, Istanbul
- Education: Darulfünun (Istanbul University)
- Spouse: Hatice Ülken (m. 1924)
- Children: 1
- Scientific career
- Fields: Philosophy
- Workplaces: Istanbul University; Ankara University
- Notable students: Pertev Naili Boratav

Hilmi Ziya Ülken (1901–1974) was a Turkish scholar and writer who had an influential role in the development of sociological and philosophical views in Turkey. In addition to his scientific work, he produced literary work, including poems.

== Early life and education ==
Hilmi Ziya was born in Constantinople on 3 October 1901. His father, Mehmet Ziya Bey, was a faculty member at Darulfünun, the precursor of Istanbul University, where he taught chemistry and served as the dean of the School of Dentistry and Pharmaceutics. His mother, Müşfike Hanım, was part of a family from Kazan, and her father, Kerim Hazret, was a religious figure who settled in Constantinople in the 1850s when the Ottoman Sultan Abdulaziz invited him during the Crimean War.

In 1918 Hilmi Ziya graduated from İstanbul High School and attended Darulfünun's School of Political Sciences where he received a degree in 1921.

== Career ==
Following his graduation, Hilmi Ziya worked as a geography teacher. After obtaining further education at Darulfünun in the fields of ethics, sociology and history of philosophy he continued to work as a teacher in Ankara and Istanbul. In Ankara he worked at the teachers’ school. He taught sociology at the Istanbul High School, where one of his pupils was Pertev Naili Boratav. He also taught philosophy and sociology at the Galatasaray High School.

In 1933 Hilmi Ziya went to Berlin for a research visit. The same year Darulfünun was reorganized as Istanbul University and following his return to Turkey he joined the Department of Philosophy as an assistant professor of Turkish cultural history. He taught the history of doctrines, the history of logic, philosophy, sociology and history of art. One of his colleagues at the department was the German philosopher Hans Reichenbach who settled in Istanbul due to the Nazi rule in Germany. Ülken became an attending professor in 1944 and an ordinary professor in 1957. He served as the chair of the Department of Sociology at İstanbul University.

Hilmi Ziya joined Ankara University in the 1950s and became the dean of Faculty of Theology in 1959, but he resigned from office soon. He was elected to the same post in 1962. However, he again resigned after six months. From 1964 he began to teach the first course on philosophy of education in the Faculty of Educational Sciences at the University of Ankara. He retired from his teaching post in 1973.

=== Views ===
His views were mostly influenced from the work by various Muslim, Turkish and European figures such as Ibn Arabi, Mehmet Fuat Köprülü, Ziya Gökalp, Mehmet İzzet, Émile Durkheim, Henri Bergson, Émile Boutroux, Baruch Spinoza, Max Scheler and Martin Heidegger. Ülken reported that he and other leading figures began to follow the ideas of Henri Bergson in that these ideas offered them a spiritual command of intuition and a material power of change. Because they needed such an inspiration during the armistice period.

Following the establishment of the Republic of Turkey in 1923 Ülken adopted a conservative version of the republicanism. Around 1926 he argued that if nationalism recognizes civil and political rights, it becomes the most modern political regime. He also maintained that the republic as a regime was the only suitable form of government for modern citizens.

In the late 1920s while Ülken was teaching at Darulfünun he supported the idea-oriented sociology against the experimental sociology. During his term at Istanbul University Ülken was among the first Turkish scholars who analysed with logical empiricism.

=== Work ===
Ülken was the author of various books which included textbooks on psychology, sociology and philosophy. In 1931 he published Aşk Ahlakı (Turkish: Ethics of Love) that presented his views on ethical philosophy containing sociological and cultural dimensions. His another book was İnsani Vatanperverlik (1933; Turkish: Humanist Patriotism) in which he discussed humanistic universalism and nationalism and attempted to present a solution to the problem between idealism and realism. This book was his first and only attempt to produce a philosophical syncretism. In 1935 Ülken published a book on the functions of translation entitled Uyanış Devirlerinde Tercümenin Rolü (Turkish: The role of translation during ages of reawakening). There he argued that translation provides creative power when a group involves in the reawakening process. One of his most known books was Türkiye'de Çağdaş Düşünce Tarihi (1966; Turkish History of Modern Thought in Turkey) in which he examined the history of thought in Turkey. His study contained an analysis of the topic across three periods, namely the Tanzimat period, the Meşrutiyet period and the Republic period. His lecture notes on the philosophy of education were published as a book in 1982.

Ülken was a contributor to several publications and established some journals. He first contributed to the magazines Mihrab (Turkish: Altar) and Anadolu Mecmuası (Turkish: Anatolia Journal) in the 1920s. The other periodicals in which he published articles are as follows: Dergâh, Her Ay, Türk Yurdu, Yeni İnsanlık, Türk Düşüncesi, Adımlar and Hareket.

Ülken cofounded and published İnsan (Turkish: Man) magazine together with Nurullah Ataç, Sabahattin Eyüboğlu and Celaleddin Ezine from 1938 to 1943. From 1943 Ülken started and edited Sosyoloji Dergisi (Turkish: Journal of Sociology) which was a publication of the Faculty of Arts at Istanbul University.

=== Memberships and activities ===
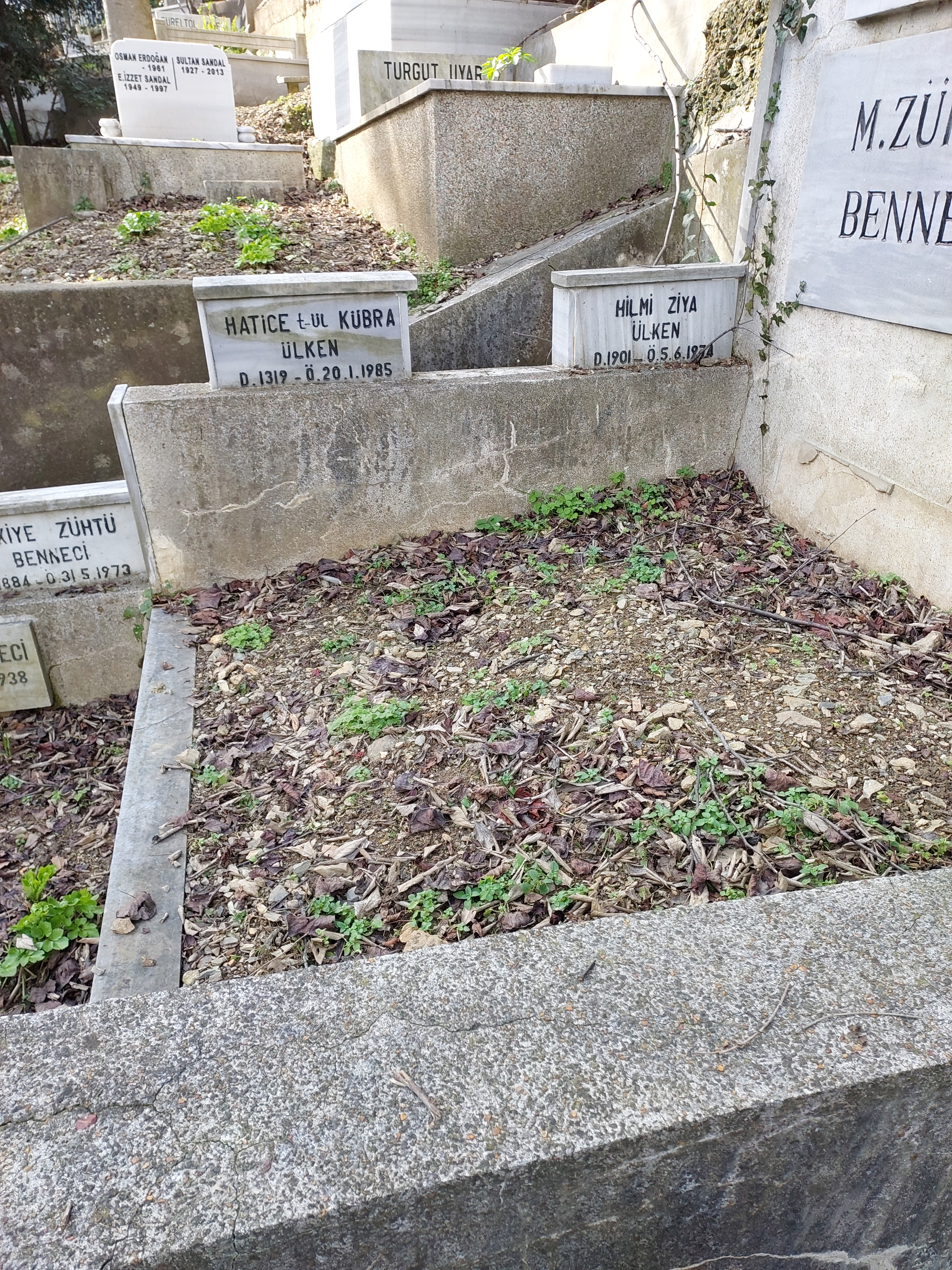
Grave of Hilmi Ziya Ülken and his wife Hatice Ülken

Hilmi Ziya established the Philosophy Association together with Mehmet Servet in 1928 which was the first in its category in the Republic of Turkey. However, it was closed in 1930. Ülken was also the founder of the Sociology Association which was established in Ankara on 2 December 1949.

During the preparations to establish the International Sociological Association (ISA) in 1949 the preparatory committee of the Constituent Congress contacted with two scholars from Turkey, Ülken and Ziyaeddin Fahri Fındıkoğlu. Ülken participated in the Congress held in Oslo in September 1949. He was the vice president of the ISA and a member of its executive committee between 1953 and 1959.

== Personal life and death ==
Hilmi Ziya married in 1924. His wife was Hatice Ülken, and they had a daughter.

Ülken died in Istanbul on 5 June 1974 and was buried in Aşiyan cemetery, Istanbul.
