= Richard Whatmore =

American historian

Richard Whatmore (born January 19, 1968) is a professor of modern history at the University of St Andrews. His research topics include intellectual history. He is the editor-in-chief of History of European Ideas.

== Books ==
- The End of Enlightenment: Empire, Commerce, Crisis (Penguin Books Ltd, 2023)
- The History of Political Thought: A Very Short Introduction (Oxford University Press, 2022)
- Terrorists, Anarchists, And Republicans: The Genevans And The Irish In Time Of Revolution (Princeton University Press, 2019)
- What is Intellectual History? (Polity, 2015)
- Against War and Empire (Yale University Press, 2012)
- Republicanism and the French Revolution (Oxford University Press, 2000)
