= Anadolu Mecmuası =

Journal

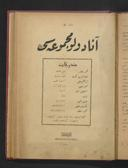
- Categories: Culture
- Publisher: Hilmi Ziya Ülken
- Founded: 1924
- Final issue: 1925
- Country: Turkey
- Based in: Istanbul
- Language: Ottoman- Turkish
- Website: Anadolu

The Ottoman journal Anadolu Mecmuası (Ottoman-Turkish:انادولو مجموعه سى; DMG: Anadolu Mecmuası; English: "Anatolia") was published in Istanbul in 11 issues between 1924 and 1925. It was edited by Hilmi Ziya Ülken (1901-1974), a philosopher and professor for sociology at the University of Istanbul and by the historian Mükrimin Halil Yinanç (1898-1961). The idea of the journal was born by an intellectual movement of professors and students of different disciplines (“Anadoluculuk“), with Yinanç as their main representative. The journal served the spreading of their ideas and as literary platform for Anatolian topics such as folklore, history, philosophy and geography. The term “anatolian homeland“ should demonstrate that it defines the nation and the history of the Turkish Republic should be considered as the history of Anatolia.
