= Beşir Ayvazoğlu =

- Born: 11 February 1953 (age 72); Sivas, Turkey
- Genres: Ottoman classical music, Turkish makam music
- Occupation: Lyricist

Beşir Ayvazoğlu (born 11 February 1953, Zara, Sivas) is a Turkish lyricist, writer and journalist.

Ayvazoğlu graduated from the Bursa Institute of Education, Department of Literature. He taught Turkish and literature at various high schools. He is a former expert at TRT.

Between 1985 and 1991, Ayvazoğlu was the art director of the newspaper Tercüman. He also worked as the general director of the Yeni Ufuk newspaper. He was one of the contributors of now-defunct Hareket magazine.

Ayvazoğlu is the author of the book Aşk Estetiği (Turkish: The Aesthetics of Divine Love). He has also written poetry, essays, biographies, literary analyses, interviews. and plays.

== See also ==
- List of composers of classical Turkish music
