= Hareket =

Conservative magazine in Turkey (1939–1982)

- Editor: Nurettin Topçu
- Categories: Political magazine
- Frequency: Monthly
- Founder: Nurettin Topçu
- Founded: 1939
- First issue: February 1939
- Final issue: March 1982
- Country: Turkey
- Based in: İzmir; Istanbul
- Language: Turkish

Hareket (Turkish: Action) was a monthly conservative political magazine which was published between 1939 and 1982 in Turkey with some interruptions. The magazine is known for its support of the Anadoluculuk (Turkish: Anatolianism) approach.

== History and profile ==
Hareket was established by Nurettin Topçu, a conservative intellectual, in Izmir in 1939. The first issue of the magazine appeared in February 1939. Its title was a reference to the action theory of Maurice Blondel who was the teacher of Topçu. The magazine was edited by Nurettin Topçu. From the sixth issue the headquarters of the magazine moved to Istanbul.

Hareket temporarily ceased publication in May 1943 and was restarted in March 1947. Its publication again ended in June 1949. The magazine was revived in December 1952, but ended publication June 1953. The magazine was restarted in January 1966 and continued its publication until March 1977. The magazine was again restarted in March 1979 and permanently folded in March 1982 after producing a total of 187 issues.

Both the title and subtitle of the magazine were changed during its run. It was Hareket: Fikir-Sanat (Turkish: Action: Idea-Art) between February 1939 and May 1943. Its subtitle was Fikir-Ahlak-Sanat (Turkish: Idea-Ethics-Art) from March 1947 to June 1949 and Aylık Siyasi Mecmua (Turkish: Monthly Political Journal) from December 1952 to January 1953. Then it was redesigned as Aylık Fikir Mecmuası (Turkish: Monthly Journal of Ideas) in February 1953 and was used until June 1953. The magazine was renamed as Fikir ve Sanatta Hareket (Turkish: Action in Art and Idea) in January 1966, and that title was employed until its closure in March 1982.

== Contributors ==
Topçu published many articles in Hareket and discussed metaphysical and practical issues about the state and social structure that the Turkish nation should have. Major contributors of Hareket included Mehmet Kaplan, Hilmi Ziya Ülken, Ahmet Kabaklı, Ali Fuat Başgil, İsmail Kara, Beşir Ayvazoğlu, Mükrimin Halil Yınanç, Süleyman Uludağ, Ayhan Songar, Halit Refiğ, Yaşar Nuri Öztürk, Orhan Okay, Mustafa Kara, Cemil Meriç, Emin Işık, Hüseyin Hatemi, Hüsrev Hatemi, Ziyaeddin Fahri Fındıkoğlu, Ali Bulaç, Hüseyin Batuhan and Remzi Oğuz Arık.

== Content and views ==
Hareket featured articles by Turkish writers and thinkers. In addition, it published interviews and translations of the work by Western and Eastern writers, including Stefan Zweig, Oscar Wilde, Paul Valéry, René Wellek, Leo Tolstoy, Rabindranath Tagore, Jacques Prévert, Edgar Allan Poe, Blaise Pascal, Charles Péguy, Frederick Mayer, André Maurois, Irving Kristol, Karl Jaspers, Immanuel Kant, Victor Hugo, Charles Baudelaire, Raymond Aron, Julien Benda, Anton Chekhov, Miguel de Unamuno, Will Durant, Mahatma Gandhi and André Gide.

Since its early issues, Hareket attached new meanings to the concepts of religion, nationalism, social order and revolution which differed from the official views. It promoted an understanding of nationalism which was different from Ziya Gökalp's nationalism. For Hareket a national history existed within the borders of Anatolia, and this approach is called Anadoluculuk (Turkish: Anatolianism). In this approach Turkishness develops within Islam.

Although Hareket was a political publication, it did not support any political party.
