= Axial Age =

Proposed age of religious and philosophical change from the 8th to 3rd centuries BCE

Axial Age (also Axis Age, from the German Achsenzeit) is a term coined in 1949 by the German philosopher Karl Jaspers. It refers to broad changes in religious and philosophical thought that occurred in a variety of locations from about the 8th to the 3rd century BCE.

According to Jaspers, during this period, universalizing modes of thought appeared in Persia, India, China, the Levant, and the Greco-Roman world, in a striking parallel development, without any obvious admixture between these disparate cultures. Jaspers identified key thinkers from this age who had a profound influence on future philosophies and religions and pinpointed characteristics common to each area from which those thinkers emerged.

The historical validity of the Axial Age is disputed. Some criticisms of Jaspers include the lack of a demonstrable common denominator between the intellectual developments that are supposed to have emerged in unison across ancient Greece, the Levant, India, and China; lack of any radical discontinuity with "preaxial" and "postaxial" periods; and exclusion of pivotal figures that do not fit the definition (for example, Jesus, Muhammad, and Akhenaten).

Despite these criticisms, the Axial Age continues to be an influential idea, with many scholars accepting that profound changes in religious and philosophical discourse did indeed take place but disagreeing as to the underlying reasons. To quote Robert Bellah and Hans Joas, "The notion that in significant parts of Eurasia the middle centuries of the first millennium BCE mark a significant transition in human cultural history, and that this period can be referred to as the Axial Age, has become widely, but not universally, accepted."

== Origin of the concept ==
Jaspers introduced the concept of an Axial Age in his book Vom Ursprung und Ziel der Geschichte (The Origin and Goal of History), published in 1949. The simultaneous appearance of thinkers and philosophers in different areas of the world had been remarked by numerous authors since the 18th century, notably by the French Indologist Abraham Hyacinthe Anquetil-Duperron. Jaspers explicitly cited some of these authors, including Victor von Strauß (1859) and Ernst von Lasaulx (1870). He was unaware of the first fully nuanced theory from 1873 by John Stuart Stuart-Glennie, forgotten by Jaspers' time, and which Stuart-Glennie termed "the moral revolution". Stuart-Glennie and Jaspers both claimed that the Axial Age should be viewed as an objective empirical fact of history, independently of religious considerations. Jaspers argued that during the Axial Age, "the spiritual foundations of humanity were laid simultaneously and independently in China, India, Persia, Judea, and Greece. And these are the foundations upon which humanity still subsists today."

Jaspers identified a number of key thinkers as having had a profound influence on future philosophies and religions, and identified characteristics common to each area from which those thinkers emerged. Jaspers held up this age as unique and one to which the rest of the history of human thought might be compared.

== Characteristics ==
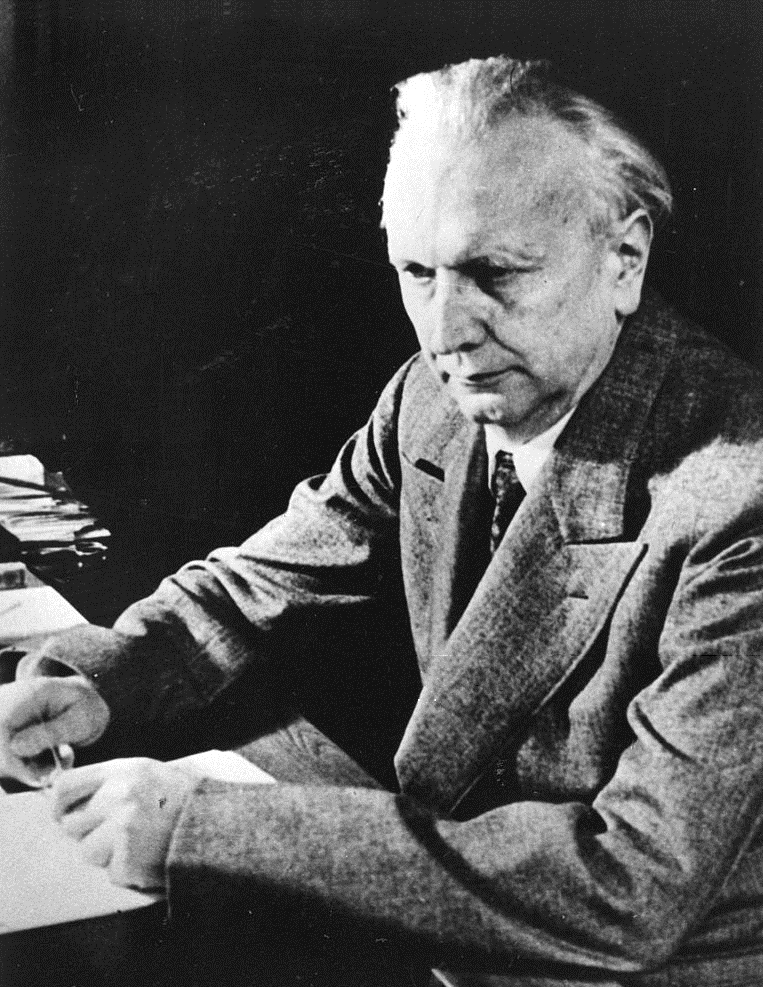
Jaspers argued that the Axial Age gave birth to philosophy as a discipline

Jaspers presented his first outline of the Axial age by a series of examples:

Confucius and Lao-Tse were living in China, all the schools of Chinese philosophy came into being, including those of Mo Ti, Chuang Tse, Lieh Tzu and a host of others; India produced the Upanishads and Buddha and, like China, ran the whole gamut of philosophical possibilities down to materialism, scepticism and nihilism; in Iran, Zarathustra taught a challenging view of the world as a struggle between good and evil; in Ancient Israel the prophets made their appearance from Elijah by way of Isaiah and Jeremiah to Deutero-Isaiah; Greece witnessed the appearance of Homer, of the philosophers—Parmenides, Heraclitus and Plato—of the tragedians, of Thucydides and Archimedes. Everything implied by these names developed during these few centuries almost simultaneously in China, India and the West.

Jaspers described the Axial Age as "an interregnum between two ages of great empire, a pause for liberty, a deep breath bringing the most lucid consciousness". It has also been suggested that the Axial Age was a historically liminal period, when "old certainties had lost their validity and new ones were still not ready".

Jaspers had a particular interest in the similarities in circumstance and thought of its figures. Similarities included an engagement in the quest for human meaning and the rise of a new élite class of religious leaders and thinkers in China, India and the Mediterranean.

Individual thinkers each laid spiritual foundations within a framework of a changing social environment. Jaspers argues that the characteristics appeared under similar political circumstances: China, India, the Middle East and the Occident each comprised multiple small states engaged in internal and external struggles. The three regions all gave birth to, and then institutionalized, a tradition of travelling scholars, who roamed from city to city to exchange ideas. After the Spring and Autumn period (8th to 5th centuries BCE) and the Warring States period (5th to 3rd centuries BCE), Taoism and Confucianism emerged in China. In other regions, the scholars largely developed extant religious traditions; in India, Hinduism, Buddhism, and Jainism; in Persia, Zoroastrianism; in the Levant, Judaism; and in Greece, Sophism and other classical philosophies.

Many of the cultures of the Axial Age have been considered second-generation societies because they developed on the basis of societies which preceded them.

== Thinkers and movements ==
In China, the Hundred Schools of Thought (c. 6th century BCE) were in contention and Confucianism and Taoism arose during this era, and in this area it remains a profound influence on social and religious life.

Zoroastrianism, another of Jaspers' examples, is one of the first monotheistic religions. William W. Malandra and R. C. Zaehner, suggest that Zoroaster may indeed have been an early contemporary of Cyrus the Great living around 550 BCE. Mary Boyce and other leading scholars who once supported much earlier dates for Zarathustra/Zoroaster have recently changed their position on when he likely lived, so that there is an emerging consensus regarding him as a contemporary or near-contemporary of Cyrus the Great.

Jainism propagated the religion of sramanas (previous Tirthankaras) and influenced Indian philosophy by propounding the principles of ahimsa (non-violence), karma, samsara, and asceticism. Mahavira (24th Tirthankara in the 5th century BCE), known as a fordmaker of Jainism and a contemporary with the Buddha, lived during this age.

Buddhism, also of the sramana tradition of India, was another of the world's most influential philosophies, founded by Siddhartha Gautama, or the Buddha, who lived c. 5th century BCE; its spread was aided by Ashoka, who lived late in the period.

Rabbinic Judaism accounts for its hard shift away from idolatry/polytheism (which was more common among Biblical Israelites) by mythologizing the eradication of the Evil Inclination for idolatry which was said to occur in the early Second Temple period. It has been argued that this development in monotheism relates to the axial shifts described by Jaspers.

Jaspers' axial shifts included the rise of Platonism (c. 4th century BCE) and Neoplatonism (3rd century CE), which would later become a major influence on the Western world through both Christianity and secular thought throughout the Middle Ages and into the Renaissance.

== Reception ==
In addition to Jaspers, the philosopher Eric Voegelin referred to this age as The Great Leap of Being, constituting a new spiritual awakening and a shift of perception from societal to individual values. Thinkers and teachers like the Buddha, Pythagoras, Heraclitus, Parmenides, and Anaxagoras contributed to such awakenings which Plato would later call anamnesis, or a remembering of things forgotten.

David Christian notes that the first "universal religions" appeared in the age of the first universal empires and of the first all-encompassing trading networks.

Anthropologist David Graeber has pointed out that "the core period of Jasper's Axial age ... corresponds almost exactly to the period in which coinage was invented. What's more, the three parts of the world where coins were first invented were also the very parts of the world where those sages lived; in fact, they became the epicenters of Axial Age religious and philosophical creativity." Drawing on the work of classicist Richard Seaford and literary theorist Marc Shell on the relation between coinage and early Greek thought, Graeber argues that an understanding of the rise of markets is necessary to grasp the context in which the religious and philosophical insights of the Axial Age arose. The ultimate effect of the introduction of coinage was, he argues, an "ideal division of spheres of human activity that endures to this day: on the one hand the market, on the other, religion".

German sociologist Max Weber played an important role in Jaspers' thinking. Shmuel Eisenstadt argues in the introduction to The Origins and Diversity of Axial Age Civilizations that Weber's work in his The Religion of China: Confucianism and Taoism, The Religion of India: The Sociology of Hinduism and Buddhism and Ancient Judaism provided a background for the importance of the period, and notes parallels with Eric Voegelin's Order and History. In the same book, Shmuel Eisenstadt analyses economic circumstances relating to the coming of the Axial Age in Greece.

Wider acknowledgement of Jaspers' work came after it was presented at a conference and published in Daedalus in 1975, and Jaspers' suggestion that the period was uniquely transformative generated important discussion among other scholars, such as Jóhann P. Árnason. Religious historian Karen Armstrong explored the period in her book The Great Transformation, and the theory has been the focus of numerous academic conferences. In literature, Gore Vidal in his novel Creation covers much of this Axial Age through the fictional perspective of a Persian adventurer.

Usage of the term has expanded beyond Jaspers' original formulation. Yves Lambert argues that the Enlightenment was a Second Axial Age, including thinkers such as Isaac Newton and Albert Einstein, wherein relationships between religion, secularism, and traditional thought are changing. A collective History of the Axial Age has been published in 2019: generally the authors contested the existence of an "identifiable Axial Age confined to a few Eurasian hotspots in the last millennium BCE" but tended to accept "axiality" as a cluster of traits emerging time and again whenever societies reached a certain threshold of scale and level of complexity.

Besides time, usage of the term has expanded beyond the original field. A philosopher, Jaspers focused on philosophical development of the Age. Historians Hermann Kulke and Max Ostrovsky demonstrated that the Age is even more Axial in historical and geopolitical senses. Jaspers, in fact, noted the tip of the iceberg. Pre-Axial cultures, he wrote, were dominated by the river valley civilizations while by the end of the Axial Age rose universal empires which dominated history for centuries since. With the researches of Kulke and Ostrovsky the whole iceberg emerged. Universal empires did not come by the end of the Axial Age. The first of them, Persia came at the peak of the Axial Age and conquered Mesopotamia and Egypt. Both ceased to be civilizations in themselves and became provinces in a completely new form of imperial system which stretched from India to Greece. Thus the Bronze Age civilizations were succeeded by Axial civilizations with their universal empires. The formation of empires in the Age, synchronous and successive, was the most intensive in world history surpassing the colonial surge. Before forming another universal empire, the Chinese civilization expanded at the peak of the Axial Age, turning the original core into Country in the Middle (Chung-kuo). The new geopolitical setting of China changed less in the following two millennia than it did in the Axial Age. The Axial Age formed two major geopolitical systems, a wider China and a much vaster Indo-Mediterranean system. The two were separated from each other by Tibet which limited their political and military contacts but both systems were linked by the Silk Road creating a trans-Eurasian trade belt stretching from the Pacific to the Atlantic.

Several scholars supposed ecological prime trigger for the rise of this Axial belt Stephen Sanderson researched religious evolution in the Axial Age, arguing that religions and religious change in general are essentially biosocial adaptations to changing environments. Ostrovsky suggests increased fertility in the rainy zones of the Eurasian temperate belt. He regards the Axial belt of civilizations as the embryo of the present Global North. It shifted northward during the Middle Ages due to climatic change and after the Seafaring Revolution penetrated to the temperate North America. "But from a historical point of view, it is the same imperial belt which first appeared in the Axial Age."

The validity of the concept has been called into question. In 2006 Diarmaid MacCulloch called the Jaspers thesis "a baggy monster, which tries to bundle up all sorts of diversities over four very different civilisations, only two of which had much contact with each other during the six centuries that (after adjustments) he eventually singled out, between 800 and 200 BCE". In 2013, another comprehensive critique appears in Iain Provan's book Convenient Myths: The Axial Age, Dark Green Religion, and the World That Never Was.

== See also ==
- Ancient philosophy
