= History of human thought =

The history of human thought covers the history of philosophy, history of science and history of political thought and spans across the history of humanity. The academic discipline studying it is called intellectual history.

Merlin Donald has claimed that human thought has progressed through three historic stages: the episodic, the mimetic, and the mythic stages, before reaching the current stage of theoretic thinking or culture. According to him the final transition occurred with the invention of science in Ancient Greece.

== Prehistoric human thought ==
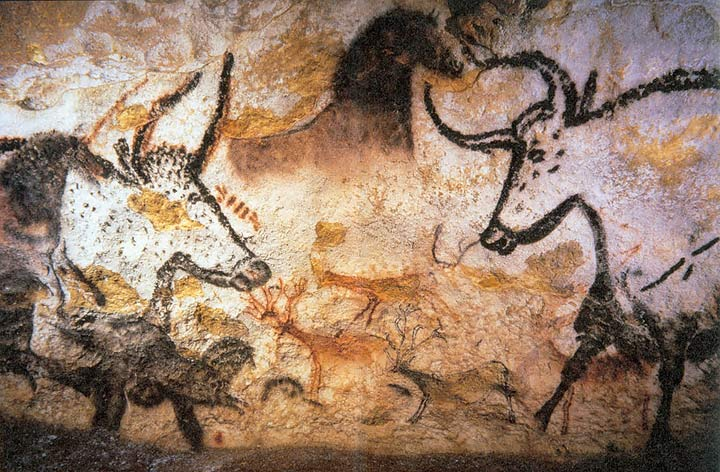
Lascaux cave paintings from France

Prehistory covers human intellectual history before the invention of writing. The first identified cultures are from the Upper Paleolithic era, evidenced by regional patterns in artefacts such as cave art, Venus figurines, and stone tools. The Aterian culture was engaged in symbolically constituted material culture, creating what are amongst the earliest African examples of personal ornamentation.

=== Origins of religion ===
The Natufian culture of ancient Middle East produced zoomorphic art. The Khiamian culture which followed moved into depicting human beings, which was called by Jacques Cauvin a "revolution in symbols", becoming increasingly realistic. According to him, this led to the development of religion, with the Woman and the Bull as the first sacred figures. He claims that this led to a revolution in human thinking, with humans for the first time moving from animal or spirit worship to the worship of a supreme being, with humans clearly in hierarchical relation to it. Another early form of religion has been identified by Marija Gimbutas as the worship of the Great Goddess, the Bird or Snake Goddess, the Vegetation Goddess, and the Male God in Old Europe.

An important innovation in religious thought was the belief in the sky god. The Aryans had a common god of the sky called Dyeus, and the Indian Dyaus, the Greek Zeus, and the Roman Jupiter were all further developments, with the Latin word for God being Deus. Any masculine sky god is often also king of the gods, taking the position of patriarch within a pantheon. Such king gods are collectively categorized as "sky father" deities, with a polarity between sky and earth often being expressed by pairing a "sky father" god with an "earth mother" goddess (pairings of a sky mother with an earth father are less frequent). A main sky goddess is often the queen of the gods. In antiquity, several sky goddesses in ancient Egypt, Mesopotamia, and the Near East were called Queen of Heaven.

== Ancient thought ==
=== Axial age ===
The Axial Age was a period between 750 and 350 BCE during which major intellectual development happened around the world. This included the development of Chinese philosophy by Confucius, Mozi, and others; the Upanishads and Gautama Buddha in Indian philosophy; Zoroaster in Ancient Persia; the Jewish prophets Elijah, Isaiah, Jeremiah, and Deutero-Isaiah in Ancient Israel; Ancient Greek philosophy and literature, all independently of each other.

=== Ancient Chinese thought ===
The Hundred Schools of Thought were philosophers and schools of thought that flourished in Ancient China from the 6th century to 221 BCE, an era of great cultural and intellectual expansion in China. Even though this period – known in its earlier part as the Spring and Autumn period and the Warring States period – in its latter part was fraught with chaos and bloody battles, it is also known as the Golden Age of Chinese philosophy because a broad range of thoughts and ideas were developed and discussed freely. The thoughts and ideas discussed and refined during this period have profoundly influenced lifestyles and social consciousness up to the present day in East Asian countries. The intellectual society of this era was characterized by itinerant scholars, who were often employed by various state rulers as advisers on the methods of government, war, and diplomacy. This period ended with the rise of the Qin dynasty and the subsequent purge of dissent.

The Book of Han lists ten major schools, they are:

Confucianism
teaches that human beings are teachable, improvable and perfectible through personal and communal endeavour especially including self-cultivation and self-creation. A main idea of Confucianism is the cultivation of virtue and the development of moral perfection. Confucianism holds that one should give up one's life, if necessary, either passively or actively, for the sake of upholding the cardinal moral values of ren and yi.
Legalism
Often compared with Machiavelli, and foundational for the traditional Chinese bureaucratic empire, the Legalists examined administrative methods, emphasizing a realistic consolidation of the wealth and power of autocrat and state.
Taoism
A philosophy which emphasizes the Three Jewels of the Tao: compassion, moderation, and humility, while Taoist thought generally focuses on nature, the relationship between humanity and the cosmos; health and longevity; and wu wei (action through inaction). Harmony with the Universe, or the source thereof (Tao), is the intended result of many Taoist rules and practices.
Mohism
Advocated the idea of universal love: Mozi believed that "everyone is equal before heaven", and that people should seek to imitate heaven by engaging in the practice of collective love. His epistemology can be regarded as primitive materialist empiricism; he believed that human cognition ought to be based on one's perceptions – one's sensory experiences, such as sight and hearing – instead of imagination or internal logic, elements founded on the human capacity for abstraction. Mozi advocated frugality, condemning the Confucian emphasis on ritual and music, which he denounced as extravagant.
Naturalism
The School of Naturalists or the Yin-yang school, which synthesized the concepts of yin and yang and the Five Elements; Zou Yan is considered the founder of this school.
Agrarianism

Advocated peasant utopian communalism and egalitarianism. The Agrarians believed that Chinese society should be modeled around that of the early sage king Shen Nong, a folk hero which was portrayed in Chinese literature as "working in the fields, along with everyone else, and consulting with everyone else when any decision had to be reached".
Logicians

Focused on definition and logic. It is said to have parallels with that of the Ancient Greek sophists or dialecticians. The most notable Logician was Gongsun Longzi.
School of Diplomacy

Focused on practical matters instead of any moral principle, so it stressed political and diplomatic tactics, and debate and lobbying skill. Scholars from this school were good orators, debaters and tacticians.
Miscellaneous School
Integrated teachings from different schools; for instance, Lü Buwei found scholars from different schools to write a book called Lüshi Chunqiu cooperatively. This school tried to integrate the merits of various schools and avoid their perceived flaws.
School of "Minor-talks"
Was not a unique school of thought, but a philosophy constructed of all the thoughts which were discussed by and originated from normal people on the street.

Other groups included:

- The School of the Military that studied strategy and the philosophy of war; Sun Tzu and Sun Bin were influential leaders. However, this school was not one of the "Ten Schools" defined by Hanshu.
- Yangism was a form of ethical egoism founded by Yang Zhu. It was once widespread but fell to obscurity before the Han dynasty. Due to its stress on individualism, it influenced later generations of Taoists.
- School of the Medical Skills, a school which studied medicine and health. Bian Que and Qibo were well-known scholars. Two of the earliest and existing Chinese medical works are Huangdi Neijing and Shanghan Lun.

=== Ancient Greek thought ===
==== Pre-Socratics ====
The earliest Greek philosophers, known as the pre-Socratics, were primarily concerned with cosmology, ontology, and mathematics. They were distinguished from "non-philosophers" insofar as they rejected mythological explanations in favor of reasoned discourse. They included various schools of thought:

Milesian school
Founded by Thales of Miletus, regarded by Aristotle as the first philosopher, who held that all things arise from a single material substance, water. He was called the "first man of science," because he gave a naturalistic explanation of the cosmos and supported it with reasons. He was followed by Anaximander, who argued that the substratum or arche could not be water or any of the classical elements but was instead something "unlimited" or "indefinite" (in Greek, the apeiron). Anaximenes in turn held that the arche was air, although John Burnet argues that by this he meant that it was a transparent mist, the aether. Despite their varied answers, the Milesian school was united in looking for the Physis of the world.
Pythagoreanism
Founded by Pythagoras and sought to reconcile religious belief and reason. He is said to have been a disciple of Anaximander and to have imbibed the cosmological concerns of the Ionians, including the idea that the cosmos is constructed of spheres, the importance of the infinite, and that air or aether is the arche of everything. Pythagoreanism also incorporated ascetic ideals, emphasizing purgation, metempsychosis, and consequently a respect for all animal life; much was made of the correspondence between mathematics and the cosmos in a musical harmony. Pythagoras believed that behind the appearance of things, there was the permanent principle of mathematics, and that the forms were based on a transcendental mathematical relation.
Ephesian school
Based on the thought of Heraclitus. Contrary to the Milesian school, which posits one stable element as the arche, Heraclitus taught that panta rhei 'everything flows', the closest element to this eternal flux being fire. All things come to pass in accordance with Logos, which must be considered as "plan" or "formula", and "the Logos is common". He also posited a unity of opposites, expressed through dialectic, which structured this flux, such as that seeming opposites in fact are manifestations of a common substrate to good and evil itself. Heraclitus called the oppositional processes eris (ἔρις 'strife'), and hypothesized that the apparently stable state of dikê (δίκη 'justice'), is the harmonic unity of these opposites.
Eleatic school
Founded by Parmenides of Elea, who cast his philosophy against those who held "it is and is not the same, and all things travel in opposite directions," – presumably referring to Heraclitus and those who followed him. Whereas the doctrines of the Milesian school, in suggesting that the substratum could appear in a variety of different guises, implied that everything that exists is corpuscular, Parmenides argued that the first principle of being was One, indivisible, and unchanging. Being, he argued, by definition implies eternality, while only that which is can be thought; a thing which is, moreover, cannot be more or less, and so the rarefaction and condensation of the Milesians is impossible regarding Being; lastly, as movement requires that something exist apart from the thing moving (viz. the space into which it moves), the One or Being cannot move, since this would require that "space" both exist and not exist. While this doctrine is at odds with ordinary sensory experience, where things do indeed change and move, the Eleatic school followed Parmenides in denying that sense phenomena revealed the world as it actually was; instead, the only thing with Being was thought, or the question of whether something exists or not is one of whether it can be thought. In support of this, Parmenides's pupil Zeno of Elea attempted to prove that the concept of motion was absurd and as such motion did not exist. He also attacked the subsequent development of pluralism, arguing that it was incompatible with Being. His arguments are known as Zeno's paradoxes.
Pluralist school
Came about as the power of Parmenides's logic was such that some subsequent philosophers abandoned the monism of the Milesians, Xenophanes, Heraclitus, and Parmenides, where one thing was the arche, and adopted pluralism, such as Empedocles and Anaxagoras. There were, they said, multiple elements which were not reducible to one another and these were set in motion by love and strife (as in Empedocles) or by Mind (as in Anaxagoras). Agreeing with Parmenides that there is no coming into being or passing away, genesis or decay, they said that things appear to come into being and pass away because the elements out of which they are composed assemble or disassemble while themselves being unchanging.
This pluralist thought was taken further by Leucippus also proposed an ontological pluralism with a cosmogony based on two main elements: the vacuum and atoms. These, by means of their inherent movement, are crossing the void and creating the real material bodies. His theories were not well known by the time of Plato, however, and they were ultimately incorporated into the work of his student, Democritus, who founded Atomic theory.
Sophists
Tended to teach rhetoric as their primary vocation. Prodicus, Gorgias, Hippias, and Thrasymachus appear in various dialogues, sometimes explicitly teaching that while nature provides no ethical guidance, the guidance that the laws provide is worthless, or that nature favors those who act against the laws.

==== Classic period ====
The classic period included:

Cynics
An ascetic sect of philosophers beginning with Antisthenes in the 4th century BCE and continuing until the 5th century CE. They believed that one should live a life of Virtue in agreement with Nature. This meant rejecting all conventional desires for wealth, power, health, or celebrity, and living a life free from possessions.
Cyrenaics
A hedonist school of philosophy founded in the fourth century BCE by Aristippus, who was a student of Socrates. They held that pleasure was the supreme good, especially immediate gratifications; and that people could only know their own experiences, beyond that truth was unknowable.
Platonism
The philosophy of Plato, which was maintained and developed by his followers. The central concept was the theory of forms: the transcendent, perfect archetypes, of which objects in the everyday world are imperfect copies. The highest form was the Form of the Good, the source of being, which could be known by reason.
Peripatetic school
The philosophers who maintained and developed the philosophy of Aristotle. They advocated examination of the world to understand the ultimate foundation of things. The goal of life was the happiness which originated from virtuous actions, which consisted in keeping the mean between the two extremes of the too much and the too little.
Megarian school
Founded by Euclides of Megara, one of the pupils of Socrates. Its ethical teachings were derived from Socrates, recognizing a single good, which was apparently combined with the Eleatic doctrine of Unity. Some of Euclides's successors developed logic to such an extent that they became a separate school, known as the Dialectical school. Their work on modal logic, logical conditionals, and propositional logic played an important role in the development of logic in antiquity.
Eretrian school
Founded by Phaedo of Elis. Like the Megarians they seem to have believed in the individuality of "the Good", the denial of the plurality of virtue, and of any real difference existing between the Good and the True. Cicero tells us that they placed all good in the mind, and in that acuteness of mind by which the truth is discerned. They denied that truth could be inferred by negative categorical propositions, and would only allow positive ones, and of these only simple ones.

==== Hellenistic schools of thought ====
The Hellenistic schools of thought included:

Academic skepticism
Maintained that knowledge of things is impossible. Ideas or notions are never true; nevertheless, there are degrees of truth-likeness, and hence degrees of belief, which allow one to act. The school was characterized by its attacks on the Stoics and on the Stoic dogma that convincing impressions led to true knowledge.
Eclecticism
Aa system of philosophy which adopted no single set of doctrines but selected from existing philosophical beliefs those doctrines that seemed most reasonable. Its most notable advocate was Cicero.
Epicureanism
Founded by Epicurus in the 3rd century BCE. It viewed the universe as being ruled by chance, with no interference from gods. It regarded absence of pain as the greatest pleasure, and advocated a simple life. It was the main rival to Stoicism until both philosophies died out in the 3rd century CE.
Hellenistic Christianity
The attempt to reconcile Christianity with Greek philosophy, beginning in the late 2nd century. Drawing particularly on Platonism and the newly emerging Neoplatonism, figures such as Clement of Alexandria sought to provide Christianity with a philosophical framework.
Hellenistic Judaism
An attempt to establish the Jewish religious tradition within the culture and language of Hellenism. Its principal representative was Philo of Alexandria.
Neoplatonism

A school of religious and mystical philosophy founded by Plotinus in the 3rd century CE and based on the teachings of Plato and the other Platonists. The summit of existence was the One or the Good, the source of all things. In virtue and meditation the soul had the power to elevate itself to attain union with the One, the true function of human beings.
Neopythagoreanism
Prominent in the 1st and 2nd centuries CE, Neopythagoreanism philosophy revived Pythagorean doctrines. It was an attempt to introduce a religious element into Greek philosophy, worshipping God by living an ascetic life, ignoring bodily pleasures and all sensuous impulses, to purify the soul.
Pyrrhonism
A school of philosophical skepticism that originated with Pyrrho in the 3rd century BCE, and was further advanced by Aenesidemus in the 1st century BCE. Its objective is ataraxia (being mentally unperturbed), which is achieved through epoché (i.e. suspension of judgment) about non-evident matters (i.e., matters of belief).
Stoicism
Founded by Zeno of Citium in the 3rd century BCE. Based on the ethical ideas of the Cynics, it taught that the goal of life was to live in accordance with Nature. It advocated the development of self-control and fortitude as a means of overcoming destructive emotions.

=== Indian philosophy ===
==== Orthodox schools ====
Many Hindu intellectual traditions were classified during the medieval period of Brahmanic-Sanskritic scholasticism into a standard list of six orthodox (Astika) schools (darshanas), the "Six Philosophies" (ṣaḍ-darśana), all of which accept the testimony of the Vedas.

Samkhya
The rationalism school with dualism and atheistic themes.
Yoga
A school similar to Samkhya but accepts personally defined theistic themes.
Nyaya
The realism school emphasizing analytics and logic.
Vaisheshika
The naturalism school with atomistic themes and related to the Nyaya school.
Purva Mimamsa

The ritualism school with Vedic exegesis and philology emphasis.
Vedanta

The Upanishadic tradition, further divided into six sub-schools ranging from dualism to nondualism:
- Advaita – monism/nondualism, also includes the concept of Ajativada;
- Visishtadvaita – monism of the qualified whole;
- Dvaita – dualism;
- Dvaitadvaita – dualism–nondualism;
- Suddhadvaita; and
- Achintya Bheda Abheda

These are often coupled into three groups for both historical and conceptual reasons: Samkhya–Yoga, Nyaya–Vaishesika, and Mimamsa–Vedanta.

==== Heterodox schools ====
Several Śramaṇic movements have existed before the 6th century BCE, and these influenced both the āstika and nāstika traditions of Indian philosophy. The Śramaṇa movement gave rise to diverse range of heterodox beliefs, ranging from accepting or denying the concept of soul, atomism, antinomian ethics, materialism, atheism, agnosticism, fatalism to free will, idealization of extreme asceticism to that of family life, strict ahimsa (non-violence) and vegetarianism, to permissibility of violence and meat-eating. Notable philosophies that arose from Śramaṇic movement were Jainism, early Buddhism, Charvaka, Ajñana and Ājīvika.

Ajñana
One of the nāstika or 'heterodox' schools of ancient Indian philosophy, and the ancient school of radical Indian skepticism. It was a Śramaṇa movement and a major rival of early Buddhism and Jainism. They have been recorded in Buddhist and Jain texts. They held that it was impossible to obtain knowledge of metaphysical nature or ascertain the truth value of philosophical propositions; and even if knowledge was possible, it was useless and disadvantageous for final salvation. They were sophists who specialised in refutation without propagating any positive doctrine of their own.
Jain
Jainism is the oldest Indian philosophy that separates body (matter) from the soul (consciousness) completely. Jainism was established by Mahavira, the last and the 24th Tirthankara. Historians date the Mahavira as about contemporaneous with the Buddha in the 5th-century BCE, and accordingly the historical Parshvanatha, based on the approximately 250-year gap, is placed in 8th or 7th century BCE. Jainism is a Śramaṇic religion and rejected the authority of the Vedas. However, like all Indian religions, it shares the core concepts such as karma, ethical living, rebirth, samsara and moksha. Jainism places strong emphasis on asceticism, ahimsa (non-violence) and anekantavada (relativity of viewpoints) as a means of spiritual liberation, ideas that influenced other Indian traditions. Jainism strongly upholds the individualistic nature of soul and personal responsibility for one's decisions; and that self-reliance and individual efforts alone are responsible for one's liberation. According to the Jain philosophy, the world (Saṃsāra) is full of hiṃsā 'violence'. Therefore, one should direct all his efforts in attainment of Ratnatraya, that are Samyak Darshan, Samyak Gnana, and Samyak Chàritra which are the key requisites to attain liberation.
Buddhist philosophy
A system of thought which started with the teachings of Siddhartha Gautama, the Buddha ('awakened one'). Buddhism is founded on elements of the Śramaṇa movement, which flowered in the first half of the 1st millennium BCE, but its foundations contain novel ideas not found or accepted by other Sramana movements. Buddhism shares many philosophical views with other Indian systems, such as belief in karma (a cause-and-effect relationship), samsara (ideas about cyclic afterlife and rebirth), dharma (ideas about ethics, duties and values), impermanence of all material things and of body, and possibility of spiritual liberation (nirvana or moksha). A major departure from Hindu and Jain philosophy is the Buddhist rejection of an eternal soul (atman) in favour of anatta ('non-Self').
Ājīvika
The philosophy of Ājīvika was founded by Makkhali Gosala; it was a Śramaṇa movement and a major rival of early Buddhism and Jainism. Ājīvikas were organised renunciates who formed discrete monastic communities prone to an ascetic and simple lifestyle. Original scriptures of the Ājīvika school of philosophy may once have existed, but these are currently unavailable and probably lost. The Ājīvika school is known for its Niyati doctrine of absolute determinism (fate), the premise that there is no free will, that everything that has happened, is happening and will happen is entirely preordained and a function of cosmic principles. Ājīvika considered the karma doctrine as a fallacy. Ājīvikas were atheists and rejected the authority of the Vedas, but they believed that in every living being is an ātman – a central premise of Hinduism and Jainism.
Charvaka

was a philosophy of scepticism and materialism, founded in the Mauryan period. They were extremely critical of other schools of philosophy of the time. Charvaka deemed Vedas to be tainted by the three faults of untruth, self-contradiction, and tautology. Likewise they faulted Buddhists and Jains, mocking the concept of nirvana (liberation), reincarnation, and accumulation of merit or demerit through karma. They believed that, the viewpoint of relinquishing pleasure to avoid pain was the "reasoning of fools".

==== Similarities between Greek and Indian thought ====
Several scholars have recognised parallels between the philosophy of Pythagoras and Plato and that of the Upanishads, including their ideas on sources of knowledge, concept of justice and path to salvation, and Plato's allegory of the cave. Platonic psychology with its divisions of reason, spirit and appetite, also bears resemblance to the three gunas in the Indian philosophy of Samkhya.

Various mechanisms for such a transmission of knowledge have been conjectured including Pythagoras traveling as far as India; Indian philosophers visiting Athens and meeting Socrates; Plato encountering the ideas when in exile in Syracuse; or, intermediated through Persia.

However, other scholars, such as Arthur Berriedale Keith, J. Burnet and A. R. Wadia, believe that the two systems developed independently. They note that there is no historical evidence of the philosophers of the two schools meeting, and point out significant differences in the stage of development, orientation and goals of the two philosophical systems. Wadia writes that Plato's metaphysics were rooted in this life and his primary aim was to develop an ideal state. In contrast, Upanishadic focus was the individual, the self (atman, 'soul'), self-knowledge, and the means of an individual's moksha ('freedom, liberation in this life or after-life').

=== Persian philosophy ===
Zoroastrianism
Based on the teachings of Zoroaster (Zarathustra), appeared in Persia at some point during the period 1700-1800 BCE. His wisdom became the basis of the religion Zoroastrianism, and generally influenced the development of the Iranian branch of Indo-Iranian philosophy. Zarathustra was the first who treated the problem of evil in philosophical terms. He is also believed to be one of the oldest monotheists in the history of religion. He espoused an ethical philosophy based on the primacy of "good thoughts (andiše-e-nik), good words (goftâr-e-nik), and good deeds (kerdâr-e-nik)". The works of Zoroaster and Zoroastrianism had a significant influence on Greek philosophy and Roman philosophy. Several ancient Greek writers such as Eudoxus of Cnidus and Latin writers such as Pliny the Elder praised Zoroastrian philosophy as "the most famous and most useful". Plato learnt of Zoroastrian philosophy through Eudoxus and incorporated much of it into his own Platonic realism. In the 3rd century BCE, however, Colotes accused Plato's The Republic of plagiarizing parts of Zoroaster's On Nature, such as the Myth of Er.
Manichaeism
Founded by Mani, was influential from North Africa in the West, to China in the East. Its influence subtly continues in Western Christian thought via Saint Augustine of Hippo, who converted to Christianity from Manichaeism, which he passionately denounced in his writings, and whose writings continue to be influential among Catholic, Protestant, and Orthodox theologians. An important principle of Manichaeism was its dualistic cosmology/theology, which it shared with Mazdakism, a philosophy founded by Mazdak. Under this dualism, there were two original principles of the universe: Light, the good one; and Darkness, the evil one. These two had been mixed by a cosmic accident, and man's role in this life was through good conduct to release the parts of himself that belonged to Light. Mani saw the mixture of good and bad as a cosmic tragedy, while Mazdak viewed this in a more neutral, even optimistic way. Mazdak (died 524/528 CE) was a proto-socialist Persian reformer who gained influence under the reign of the Sassanian king Kavadh I. He claimed to be a prophet of God, and instituted communal possessions and social welfare programs. In many ways Mazdak's teaching can be understood as a call for social revolution, and has been referred to as early "communism" or proto-socialism.
Zurvanism
Characterized by the element of its First Principle which is Time (Zurvān) as a primordial creator. According to Zaehner, Zurvanism appears to have three schools of thought all of which have classical Zurvanism as their foundation:Aesthetic Zurvanism which was apparently not as popular as the materialistic kind, viewed Zurvan as undifferentiated Time, which, under the influence of desire, divided into reason (a male principle) and concupiscence (a female principle). While Zoroaster's Ormuzd created the universe with his thought, materialist Zurvanism challenged the concept that anything could be made out of nothing. Fatalistic Zurvanism resulted from the doctrine of limited time with the implication that nothing could change this preordained course of the material universe and that the path of the astral bodies of the 'heavenly sphere' was representative of this preordained course. According to the Middle Persian work Menog-i Khrad: "Ohrmazd allotted happiness to man, but if man did not receive it, it was owing to the extortion of these planets."

== Post-classical thought ==
=== Christianity ===
Early Christianity is often divided into three different branches that differ in theology and traditions, which all appeared in the 1st century CE. They include Jewish Christianity, Pauline Christianity and Gnostic Christianity. All modern Christian denominations are said to have descended from the Jewish and Pauline Christianities, with Gnostic Christianity dying, or being hunted, out of existence after the early Christian era and being largely forgotten until discoveries made in the late 19th and early twentieth centuries. There are also other theories on the origin of Christianity.

The following Christian groups appeared between the beginning of the Christian religion and the First Council of Nicaea in 325.

- Adamites
- Arianism
- Ebionites
- Elcesaites
- Marcionism
- Nazarenes

Unlike the previously mentioned groups, the following are all considered to be related to Christian Gnosticism.

- Bardaisanites
- Basilidians
- Carpocratianism
- Nicolaitans
- Sethianism
- Simonians (sometimes considered Proto-Gnostic)
- Valentinianism

Christianity has gone through many schisms (splits):

- The first significant, lasting split in historic Christianity came from the Church of the East, who left following the Christological controversy over Nestorianism in 431.
- Following the Council of Chalcedon in 451 over monophysitism, the next large split came with the Syriac and Coptic churches dividing themselves, with the dissenting churches becoming today's Oriental Orthodox. The Armenian Apostolic Church, whose representatives were not able to attend the council did not accept new dogmas and now is also seen as an Oriental Orthodox church.
- The East–West Schism (also the Great Schism or Schism of 1054) is the break of communion since the 11th century between the Catholic Church and Eastern Orthodox Churches. The schism was the culmination of theological and political differences which had developed during the preceding centuries between Eastern and Western Christianity.

Later medieval splinter movements included:

- The Cathars were a very strong movement in medieval southwestern France, but did not survive into modern times.
- In northern Italy and southeastern France, Peter Waldo founded the Waldensians in the 12th century. This movement has largely been absorbed by modern-day Protestant groups.
- In Bohemia, a movement in the early 15th century by Jan Hus called the Hussites defied Catholic dogma and still exists to this day (alternately known as the Moravian Church).
- Agonoclita
- Apostolic Brethren
- Arnoldists
- Beguines and Beghards
- Bogomilism
  - Bosnian Church
  - Patarines
- Brethren of the Free Spirit
- Donatism
- Dulcinians
- Friends of God
- Henricans
- Heresy of the Judaizers
- Lollardy
- Neo-Adamites
- Paulicianism
- Petrobrusians
- Strigolniki
- Tondrakians

=== European Middle Ages ===
The spread of Christianity caused major change in European thought. As "Christianity actively rejected scientific inquiry", it meant that thinkers of the time were much more interested in studying revelation than the physical world. Ambrose argued that astronomy could be forsaken, "for wherein does it assist our salvation?". Philosophy and critical thinking were also discounted, since according to Gregory of Nyssa, "The human voice was fashioned for one reason alone – to be the threshold through which the sentiments of the heart, inspired by the Holy Spirit, might be translated into the Word itself".

==== Carolingian Renaissance ====
The Carolingian Renaissance was a period of intellectual and cultural revival in the Carolingian Empire occurring from the late eighth century to the ninth century, as the first of three medieval renaissances. It occurred mostly during the reigns of the Carolingian rulers Charlemagne and Louis the Pious. It was supported by the scholars of the Carolingian court, notably Alcuin of York For moral betterment the Carolingian renaissance reached for models drawn from the example of the Christian Roman Empire of the 4th century. During this period there was an increase of literature, writing, the arts, architecture, jurisprudence, liturgical reforms and scriptural studies. Charlemagne's Admonitio generalis (789) and his Epistola de litteris colendis served as manifestos. The effects of this cultural revival, however, were largely limited to a small group of court literati: "it had a spectacular effect on education and culture in Francia, a debatable effect on artistic endeavors, and an immeasurable effect on what mattered most to the Carolingians, the moral regeneration of society", John Contreni observes. Beyond their efforts to write better Latin, to copy and preserve patristic and classical texts and to develop a more legible, classicizing script, the Carolingian minuscule that Renaissance humanists took to be Roman and employed as humanist minuscule, from which has developed early modern Italic script, the secular and ecclesiastical leaders of the Carolingian Renaissance for the first time in centuries applied rational ideas to social issues, providing a common language and writing style that allowed for communication across most of Europe. One of the primary efforts was the creation of a standardized curriculum for use at the recently created schools. Alcuin led this effort and was responsible for the writing of textbooks, creation of word lists, and establishing the trivium and quadrivium as the basis for education. Art historian Kenneth Clark was of the view that by means of the Carolingian Renaissance, Western civilization survived by the skin of its teeth.

==== Ottonian Renaissance ====
The Ottonian Renaissance was a limited renaissance of logic, science, economy and art in central and southern Europe that accompanied the reigns of the first three emperors of the Saxon Dynasty, all named Otto: Otto I (936–973), Otto II (973–983), and Otto III (983–1002), and which in large part depended upon their patronage. Pope Sylvester II and Abbo of Fleury were leading figures in this movement. The Ottonian Renaissance began after Otto's marriage to Adelaide (951) united the kingdoms of Italy and Germany and thus brought the West closer to Byzantium. The period is sometimes extended to cover the reign of Henry II as well, and, rarely, the Salian dynasts. The term is generally confined to Imperial court culture conducted in Latin in Germany. It was shorter than the preceding Carolingian Renaissance and to a large extent a continuation of it – this has led historians such as Pierre Riché to prefer evoking it as a 'third Carolingian renaissance', covering the 10th century and running over into the 11th century, with the 'first Carolingian renaissance' occurring during Charlemagne's own reign and the 'second Carolingian renaissance' happening under his successors. The Ottonian Renaissance is recognized especially in the arts and architecture, invigorated by renewed contact with Constantinople, in some revived cathedral schools, such as that of Bruno of Cologne, in the production of illuminated manuscripts from a handful of elite scriptoria, such as Quedlinburg, founded by Otto in 936, and in political ideology. The Imperial court became the center of religious and spiritual life, led by the example of women of the royal family: Matilda the literate mother of Otto I, or his sister Gerberga of Saxony, or his consort Adelaide, or Empress Theophanu.

==== Renaissance of the 12th century ====
The Renaissance of the 12th century was a period of many changes at the outset of the High Middle Ages. It included social, political and economic transformations, and an intellectual revitalization of Western Europe with strong philosophical and scientific roots. For some historians these changes paved the way to later achievements such as the literary and artistic movement of the Italian Renaissance in the 15th century and the scientific developments of the 17th century.

The increased contact with the Islamic world in Spain and Sicily, the Crusades, the Reconquista, as well as increased contact with Byzantium, allowed Europeans to seek and translate the works of Hellenic and Islamic philosophers and scientists, especially the works of Aristotle. The development of medieval universities allowed them to aid materially in the translation and propagation of these texts and started a new infrastructure which was needed for scientific communities. In fact, the European university put many of these texts at the centre of its curriculum. The translation of texts from other cultures, especially ancient Greek works, was an important aspect of both this Twelfth-Century Renaissance and the latter Renaissance (of the 15th century), the relevant difference being that Latin scholars of this earlier period focused almost entirely on translating and studying Greek and Arabic works of natural science, philosophy and mathematics, while the latter Renaissance focus was on literary and historical texts.

A new method of learning called scholasticism developed in the late 12th century from the rediscovery of the works of Aristotle; the works of medieval Jewish and Islamic thinkers influenced by him, notably Maimonides, Avicenna (see Avicennism) and Averroes (see Averroism); and the Christian philosophers influenced by them, most notably Albertus Magnus, Bonaventure and Abélard. Those who practiced the scholastic method believed in empiricism and supporting Roman Catholic doctrines through secular study, reason, and logic. Other notable scholastics ("schoolmen") included Roscelin and Peter Lombard. One of the main questions during this time was the problem of universals. Prominent non-scholastics of the time included Anselm of Canterbury, Peter Damian, Bernard of Clairvaux, and the Victorines. The most famous of the scholastic practitioners was Thomas Aquinas (later declared a Doctor of the Church), who led the move away from Platonism and Augustinianism and towards Aristotelianism.

During the High Middle Ages in Europe, there was increased innovation in means of production, leading to economic growth. These innovations included the windmill, manufacturing of paper, the spinning wheel, the magnetic compass, eyeglasses, the astrolabe, and Hindu–Arabic numerals.

==== Islamic contributions to medieval Europe ====
During the high medieval period, the Islamic world was at its cultural peak, supplying information and ideas to Europe, via Al-Andalus, Sicily and the Crusader kingdoms in the Levant. These included Latin translations of the Greek Classics and of Arabic texts in astronomy, mathematics, science, and medicine. Translation of Arabic philosophical texts into Latin "led to the transformation of almost all philosophical disciplines in the medieval Latin world", with a particularly strong influence of Muslim philosophers being felt in natural philosophy, psychology and metaphysics. Other contributions included technological and scientific innovations via the Silk Road, including Chinese inventions such as paper and gunpowder. The Islamic world also influenced other aspects of medieval European culture, partly by original innovations made during the Islamic Golden Age, including various fields such as the arts, agriculture, alchemy, music, pottery, etc.

=== Islamic thought ===
The religion of Islam founded by Muhammad in 7th century Arabia incorporated ideas from Zoroastrianism, Judaism, and Christianity, specifically monotheism, Last Judgment, Heaven and Hell. However, it is closer to Judaism than Christianity, since it believes in the Unity of God, and God is seen as powerful rather than loving. The doctrine of Islam is based on five pillars: Shahada 'faith'; Salat 'prayer'; Zakat 'alms-giving'; Sawm 'fasting'; and Hajj 'pilgrimage'. Its beliefs are collected in the Quran, composed in its final form by 933.

Starting from soon after its foundation, Islam has broken into several strands, including:

Sunni Islam
Also known as Ahl as-Sunnah wa'l-Jamā'h or simply Ahl as-Sunnah, Sunnism is the largest denomination of Islam. The Sunnis believe that Muhammad did not specifically appoint a successor to lead the Muslim ummah 'community' before his death, however they approve of the private election of the first companion, Abu Bakr. Sunni Muslims regard the first four caliphs (Abu Bakr, Umar ibn al-Khattab, Uthman ibn Affan and Ali ibn Abi Talib) as "al-Khulafā'ur-Rāshidūn", "The Rightly Guided Caliphs".
Shia Islam
The second-largest denomination of Islam, comprising 10–20% of the total Muslim population. In addition to believing in the authority of the Quran and teachings of Muhammad, Shia believe that Muhammad's family, the Ahl al-Bayt 'People of the House', including his descendants known as Imams, have special spiritual and political authority over the community and believe that Ali ibn Abi Talib, Muhammad's cousin and son-in-law, was the first of these Imams and was the rightful successor to Muhammad, and thus reject the legitimacy of the first three Rashidun caliphs. The Shia Islamic faith is broad and includes many different groups. There are various Shia theological beliefs, schools of jurisprudence, philosophical beliefs, and spiritual movements:
- Zaidiyyah – historically come from the followers of Zayd ibn Ali.
- Alawites – a distinct religion that developed in the 9th/10th century.
- Ismailism – includes the Nizārī, Sevener, Mustaali, Dawoodi Bohra, Hebtiahs Bohra, Sulaimani Bohra, and Alavi Bohra sub-denominations.
- Twelvers – believe in twelve Imams and are the only school to comply with Hadith of the Twelve Successors, where Muhammad stated that he would have twelve successors. Historically, Twelver Shia scholars (such as Shaykh Tusi) did not consider Alawites as Shia Muslims while condemning their heretical beliefs. Ibn Taymiyyah also pointed out that Alawites were not Shi'ites.
- Druze – A distinct traditional religion that developed in the 11th century as an offshoot of Ismailism. Druze are not generally considered Muslims.
Kharijite
Literally, 'those who seceded', Kharijite is a general term embracing a variety of Muslim sects which, while originally supporting the Caliphate of Ali, later on fought against him and eventually succeeded in his martyrdom while he was praying in the mosque of Kufa. While there are few remaining Kharijite or Kharijite-related groups, the term is sometimes used to denote Muslims who refuse to compromise with those with whom they disagree. The major Kharijite sub-sect today is the Ibadi. The sect developed out of the 7th century Islamic sect of the Kharijites. While Ibadi Muslims maintain most of the beliefs of the original Kharijites, they have rejected the more aggressive methods. A number of Kharijite groups went extinct in the past:
- Sufris were a sect of Islam in the 7th and 8th centuries, and a part of the Kharijites. Their most important branches were the Qurrīyya and Nukkari.
- Harūrīs were an early Muslim sect from the period of the Four Rightly-Guided Caliphs (632–661 CE), named for their first leader, Habīb ibn-Yazīd al-Harūrī.
- Azariqa
- Najdat
- Adjarites
Sufism
Islam's mystical–ascetic dimension, represented by schools or orders known as Tasawwufī-Ṭarīqah. It is seen as that aspect of Islamic teaching that deals with the purification of inner self. By focusing on the more spiritual aspects of religion, Sufis strive to obtain direct experience of God by making use of "intuitive and emotional spiritual faculties" that one must be trained to use. It is composed of different orders:
- The Azeemiyya order was founded in 1960 by Qalandar Baba Auliya, also known as Syed Muhammad Azeem Barkhia.
- The Bektashi order was founded in the 13th century by the Islamic saint Haji Bektash Veli, and greatly influenced during its formulative period by the Hurufi Ali al-'Ala in the 15th century and reorganized by Balım Sultan in the 16th century. Because of its adherence to the Twelve Imams it is classified under Twelver Shia Islam.
- The Chishti order (Persian: چشتیہ) was founded by (Khawaja) Abu Ishaq Shami ("the Syrian"; died 941) who brought Sufism to the town of Chisht, some 95 miles east of Herat in present-day Afghanistan. Before returning to the Levant, Shami initiated, trained and deputized the son of the local Emir (Khwaja) Abu Ahmad Abdal (died 966). Under the leadership of Abu Ahmad's descendants, the Chishtiyya as they are also known, flourished as a regional mystical order. The founder of the Chishti Order in South Asia was Moinuddin Chishti.
- The Kubrawiya order was founded in the 13th century by Najmuddin Kubra in Bukhara in modern-day Uzbekistan.
- The Mevlevi order is better known in the West as the "whirling dervishes".
- Mouride is most prominent in Senegal and The Gambia, with headquarters in the holy city of Touba, Senegal.
- The Naqshbandi order was founded in 1380 by Baha-ud-Din Naqshband Bukhari. It is considered by some to be a "sober" order known for its silent dhikr (remembrance of God) rather than the vocalized forms of dhikr common in other orders. The Süleymani and Khalidiyya orders are offshoots of the Naqshbandi order.
- The Ni'matullahi order is the most widespread Sufi order of Persia today. It was founded by Shah Ni'matullah Wali (died 1367), established and transformed from his inheritance of the Ma'rufiyyah circle. There are several suborders in existence today, the most known and influential in the West following the lineage of Javad Nurbakhsh, who brought the order to the West following the 1979 Iranian Revolution.
- The Noorbakshia order, also called Nurbakshia, claims to trace its direct spiritual lineage and chain (silsilah) to the Islamic prophet Muhammad, through Ali, by way of Ali Al-Ridha. This order became known as Nurbakshi after Shah Syed Muhammad Nurbakhsh Qahistani, who was aligned to the Kubrawiya order.
- The Oveysi (or Uwaiysi) order claims to have been founded 1,400 years ago by Uwais al-Qarni from Yemen.
- The Qadiri order is one of the oldest Sufi Orders. It derives its name from Abdul-Qadir Gilani (1077–1166), a native of the Iranian province of Gīlān. The order is one of the most widespread of the Sufi orders in the Islamic world, and can be found in Central Asia, Turkey, Balkans and much of East and West Africa. The Qadiriyyah have not developed any distinctive doctrines or teachings outside of mainstream Islam. They believe in the fundamental principles of Islam, but interpreted through mystical experience. The Ba'Alawi order is an offshoot of Qadiriyyah.
- Senussi is a religious-political Sufi order established by Muhammad ibn Ali as-Senussi. As-Senussi founded this movement due to his criticism of the Egyptian ulema.
- The Shadhili order was founded by Abu-l-Hassan ash-Shadhili. Followers (murids 'seekers') of the Shadhiliyya are often known as Shadhilis.
- The Suhrawardiyya order (Arabic: سهروردية) was founded by Abu al-Najib al-Suhrawardi (1097–1168).
- The Tijaniyyah order attach a large importance to culture and education, and emphasize the individual adhesion of the disciple (murid).

==== Islamic Golden Age ====
The Islamic Golden Age was a period of cultural, economic, and scientific flourishing in the history of Islam, traditionally dated from the 8th century to the 14th century. This period is traditionally understood to have begun during the reign of the Abbasid caliph Harun al-Rashid (786 to 809) with the inauguration of the House of Wisdom in Baghdad, the world's largest city by then, where Islamic scholars and polymaths from various parts of the world with different cultural backgrounds were mandated to gather and translate all of the world's classical knowledge into Arabic and Persian. Several historic inventions and significant contributions in numerous fields were made throughout the Islamic Middle Ages that revolutionized human history. The period is traditionally said to have ended with the collapse of the Abbasid caliphate due to Mongol invasions and the Siege of Baghdad in 1258.

==== Timurid Renaissance ====
The Timurid Renaissance was a historical period in Asian and Islamic history spanning the late 14th, the 15th, and the early 16th centuries. Following the gradual downturn of the Islamic Golden Age, the Timurid Empire, based in Central Asia ruled by the Timurid dynasty, witnessed the revival of the arts and sciences. The movement spread across the Muslim world and left profound impacts on late medieval Asia. The Timurid Renaissance was marked simultaneously with the Renaissance movement in Europe. It was described as equal in glory to the Italian Quattrocento. The Timurid Renaissance reached its peak in the 15th century, after the end of the period of Mongol invasions and conquests.

=== Renaissance ===
The Renaissance was a period in European history marking the transition from the Middle Ages to Modernity and covering the 15th and 16th centuries. It occurred after the Crisis of the Late Middle Ages and was associated with great social change. In addition to the standard periodization, proponents of a long Renaissance put its beginning in the 14th century and its end in the 17th century. The traditional view focuses more on the early modern aspects of the Renaissance and argues that it was a break from the past, but many historians today focus more on its medieval aspects and argue that it was an extension of the Middle Ages.

The intellectual basis of the Renaissance was its version of humanism, derived from the concept of Roman Humanitas and the rediscovery of classical Greek philosophy, such as that of Protagoras, who said that "Man is the measure of all things". This new thinking became manifest in art, architecture, politics, science and literature. Early examples were the development of perspective in oil painting and the recycled knowledge of how to make concrete. Although the invention of metal movable type sped the dissemination of ideas from the later 15th century, the changes of the Renaissance were not uniformly experienced across Europe: the first traces appear in Italy as early as the late 13th century, in particular with the writings of Dante and the paintings of Giotto.

As a cultural movement, the Renaissance encompassed innovative flowering of Latin and vernacular literatures, beginning with the 14th-century resurgence of learning based on classical sources, which contemporaries credited to Petrarch; the development of linear perspective and other techniques of rendering a more natural reality in painting; and gradual but widespread educational reform. In politics, the Renaissance contributed to the development of the customs and conventions of diplomacy, and in science to an increased reliance on observation and inductive reasoning. Although the Renaissance saw revolutions in many intellectual pursuits, as well as social and political upheaval, it is perhaps best known for its artistic developments and the contributions of such polymaths as Leonardo da Vinci and Michelangelo, who inspired the term "Renaissance man".

== Modern period ==
=== Scientific Revolution ===
The Scientific Revolution was a series of events that marked the emergence of modern science during the early modern period, when developments in mathematics, physics, astronomy, biology (including human anatomy) and chemistry transformed the views of society about nature. The Scientific Revolution took place in Europe towards the end of the Renaissance period and continued through the late 18th century, influencing the intellectual social movement known as the Enlightenment. While its dates are debated, the publication in 1543 of Nicolaus Copernicus's De revolutionibus orbium coelestium (On the Revolutions of the Heavenly Spheres) is often cited as marking the beginning of the Scientific Revolution.

=== Rationalism ===
A systematic school of philosophy in its own right for the first time in history – exerted an immense and profound influence on modern Western thought in general, with the birth of two influential rationalistic philosophical systems of Descartes (who spent most of his adult life and wrote all his major work in the United Provinces of the Netherlands) and Spinoza – namely Cartesianism and Spinozism. It was the 17th-century arch-rationalists like Descartes, Spinoza and Leibniz who have given the "Age of Reason" its name and place in history.

Dualism is closely associated with the thought of René Descartes (1641), which holds that the mind is a nonphysical—and therefore, non-spatial—substance. Descartes clearly identified the mind with consciousness and self-awareness and distinguished this from the brain as the seat of intelligence. Hence, he was the first to formulate the mind–body problem in the form in which it exists today. Dualism is contrasted with various kinds of monism. Spinozism (also spelled Spinozaism) is the monist philosophical system of Baruch Spinoza which defines "God" as a singular self-subsistent Substance, with both matter and thought being attributes of such.

==== Cult of Reason ====
The Cult of Reason was France's first established state-sponsored atheistic religion, intended as a replacement for Catholicism during the French Revolution. After holding sway for barely a year, in 1794 it was officially replaced by the rival Cult of the Supreme Being, promoted by Robespierre. Both cults were officially banned in 1802 by Napoleon Bonaparte with his Law on Cults of 18 Germinal, Year X.

=== Age of Enlightenment ===
The Age of Enlightenment (also known as the Age of Reason or simply the Enlightenment) was an intellectual and philosophical movement that dominated the world of ideas in Europe during the 17th to 19th centuries.

The Enlightenment emerged from a European intellectual and scholarly movement known as Renaissance humanism and was also preceded by the Scientific Revolution and the work of Francis Bacon, among others. Some date the beginning of the Enlightenment to René Descartes's 1637 philosophy of Cogito, ergo sum 'I think, therefore I Am', while others cite the publication of Isaac Newton's Principia Mathematica (1687) as the culmination of the Scientific Revolution and the beginning of the Enlightenment. French historians traditionally date its beginning to the death of Louis XIV in 1715 until the 1789 outbreak of the French Revolution. Most end it with the beginning of the 19th century. A variety of 19th-century movements, including liberalism and neoclassicism, trace their intellectual heritage to the Enlightenment.

The Enlightenment included a range of ideas centered on the sovereignty of reason and the evidence of the senses as the primary sources of knowledge and advanced ideals such as liberty, progress, toleration, fraternity, constitutional government and separation of church and state. In France, the central doctrines of the Enlightenment philosophers were individual liberty and religious tolerance, in opposition to an absolute monarchy and the fixed dogmas of the Church. The Enlightenment was marked by an emphasis on the scientific method and reductionism, along with increased questioning of religious orthodoxy—an attitude captured by Immanuel Kant's essay Answering the Question: What Is Enlightenment?, where the phrase Sapere aude 'dare to know' can be found.

=== Romanticism ===
Romanticism was an artistic and intellectual movement that originated in Europe towards the end of the 18th century. The purpose of the movement was to advocate for the importance of subjectivity, imagination, and appreciation of nature in society and culture during the Age of Enlightenment and the Industrial Revolution. Romanticism was a complex movement, with a variety of viewpoints that permeated Western civilization across the globe. Romanticists rejected the social conventions of the time in favor of a moral outlook known as individualism. They argued that passion and intuition were crucial to understanding the world, and that beauty is more than merely an affair of form, but rather something that evokes a strong emotional response. With this philosophical foundation, the Romanticists elevated a number of key themes to which they were deeply committed: a reverence for nature and the supernatural, an idealization of the past as a nobler era, a fascination with the exotic and the mysterious, and a celebration of the heroic and the sublime.

=== Modernism ===
Modernism is an early 20th-century movement in literature, the visual arts and music, emphasizing experimentation, abstraction and subjective experience. Philosophy, politics and social issues, are also aspects of the movement, which sought to change how 'human beings in a society interact and live together'. The modernist movement emerged during the late 19th century in response to significant changes in Western culture, including secularization and the growing influence of science. It is characterized as a rejection of tradition and the hunt for newer and original means of cultural expression. Modernism was influenced by widespread technological innovation, industrialization and urbanization, as well as cultural and geopolitical shifts that occurred after World War I. The movement rejected both 19th-century realism and Romanticism's concept of absolute originality – the idea of "creation from nothingness" – with techniques of collage, reprise, incorporation, rewriting, recapitulation, revision, and parody.Modernism also took a critical stance towards Enlightenment rationalism.

==== Modernity in the Middle East ====
Islam and modernity encompass the relation and compatibility between the phenomenon of modernity, its related concepts and ideas, and the religion of Islam. In order to understand the relation between Islam and modernity, one point should be made in the beginning. Similarly, modernity is a complex and multidimensional phenomenon rather than a unified and coherent phenomenon. It has historically had different schools of thoughts moving in many directions.

Intellectual movements in Iran involve the Iranian experience of modernism, through which Iranian modernity and its associated art, science, literature, poetry, and political structures have been evolving since the 19th century. Religious intellectualism in Iran develops gradually and subtly. It reached its apogee during the Persian Constitutional Revolution (1906–11). The process involved numerous philosophers, sociologists, political scientists and cultural theorists. However the associated art, cinema and poetry remained to be developed.

==== Modern African thought ====
With the rise of Afrocentrism, the push away from Eurocentrism has led to the focus on the contributions of African people and their model of world civilization and history. Afrocentrism aims to shift the focus from a perceived European-centered history to an African-centered history. More broadly, Afrocentrism is concerned with distinguishing the influence of European and Oriental peoples from African achievements.

Pan-Africanism is a worldwide movement that aims to encourage and strengthen bonds of solidarity between all indigenous and diaspora ethnic groups of African descent. Based on a common goal dating back to the Atlantic slave trade, the movement extends beyond continental Africans with a substantial support base among the African diaspora in the Americas and Europe.

=== Postmodernism ===
Emerging in the mid-twentieth century as a reaction against modernism, postmodernism is an intellectual stance or mode of discourse characterized by skepticism towards scientific rationalism and the concept of objective reality (as opposed to subjective reality). It questions the "grand narratives" of modernity, rejects the certainty of knowledge and stable meaning, and acknowledges the influence of ideology in maintaining political power. Postmodernism embraces self-referentiality, epistemological relativism, moral relativism, pluralism, irony, irreverence, and eclecticism. It opposes the "universal validity" of binary oppositions, stable identity, hierarchy, and categorization.

== Sources ==
- Abbas, Tahir (2011). Islamic Radicalism and Multicultural Politics. Taylor & Francis. ISBN 978-1-136-95960-8.
- Acharya, Mādhava (1894). The Sarva-darśana-samgraha: Or, Review of the Different Systems of Hindu Philosophy. Translated by Cowell, E. B.; Gough, A. E. London: Trübner & Co.
- Aggarwal, Ravina (2004-11-30). Beyond Lines of Control: Performance and Politics on the Disputed. Duke University Press. ISBN 0822334143.
- Althusser, Louis (1968). Reading Capital.
- Analayo (2004). Satipaṭṭhāna: The Direct Path to Realization. ISBN 978-1899579549.
- Aristotle. Metaphysics Alpha.
- Ashtiyani, Jalal-e-din (n.d.). Zarathushtra, Mazdayasna and Governance.
- Austin, David (Fall 2007). "All Roads Led to Montreal: Black Power, the Caribbean and the Black Radical Tradition in Canada". Journal of African American History. 92 (4): 516–539. doi:10.1086/JAAHv92n4p516. S2CID 140509880.
- Aylesworth, Gary (2015-02-05). "Postmodernism". In Zalta, Edward N. (ed.). Stanford Encyclopedia of Philosophy (Spring 2015 ed.). ISSN 1095-5054. OCLC 429049174.
- Baker, Keith M. (1987). University of Chicago Readings in Western Civilization. Vol. 7: The Old Regime and the French Revolution. University of Chicago Press. ISBN 978-0226069500.
- Basham, A. L. (1951). History and Doctrines of the Ajivikas – a Vanished Indian Religion. Motilal Banarsidass. ISBN 978-8120812048.
- Bauman, Zygmunt (1992). Intimations of postmodernity. London New York: Routledge. ISBN 978-0-415-06750-8.
- Beiser, Frederick C. (1987). The Fate of Reason: German Philosophy from Kant to Fichte.
- Boia, Lucian (2004). Forever Young: A Cultural History of Longevity. Reaktion Books. ISBN 978-1-86189-154-9.
- Bouzouggar, Abdeljalil; Barton, Nick; Vanhaeren, Marian; d'Errico, Francesco; Collcutt, Simon; Higham, Tom; Hodge, Edward; Parfitt, Simon; Rhodes, Edward (2007-06-12). "82,000-year-old shell beads from North Africa and implications for the origins of modern human behavior". Proceedings of the National Academy of Sciences. 104 (24): 9964–9969. doi:10.1073/pnas.0703877104. ISSN 0027-8424. PMC 1891266. PMID 17548808.
- Bryant, Edwin (2011). "The Yoga Sutras of Patanjali". In Fieser, James; Dowden, Bradley (eds.). Internet Encyclopedia of Philosophy. ISSN 2161-0002. OCLC 37741658.
- Burley, Mikel (2012). Classical Samkhya and Yoga – An Indian Metaphysics of Experience. Routledge. ISBN 978-0415648875.
- Burnet, John (1914). Greek Philosophy, Part 1: Thales to Plato (3rd ed.). London: Macmillan and Co.
- Cantor, Norman F. (1993). The Civilization of the Middle Ages: a completely revised and expanded edition of Medieval history, the life and death of a civilization. HarperCollins. ISBN 978-0-06-017033-2.
- Cauvin, Jacques (2008). The Birth of the Gods and the Origins of Agriculture. Cambridge University Press. ISBN 978-0-521-03908-6. OCLC 852497907.
- Chadha, Monima (2024-03-27). "Perceptual Experience and Concepts in Classical Indian Philosophy". In Zalta, Edward N. (ed.). Stanford Encyclopedia of Philosophy (Summer 2024 ed.). ISSN 1095-5054. OCLC 429049174.
- Chiereghin, Franco (1961). L'influenza dello spinozismo nella formazione della filosofia hegeliana [The influence of Spinozism in the formation of Hegelian philosophy] (in Italian). Padova: CEDAM.
- Childs, Peter (2000). Modernism. Routledge. ISBN 0-415-19647-7.
- Chousalkar, Ashok S. (1986). Social & Political Implications of Concepts of Justice & Dharma: A Comparative Study with Special Reference to the "Republic" and "Shantiparva". Mittal Publications. pp. 130–134.
- Clagett, Marshall (1961). The Science of Mechanics in the Middle Ages. Madison: University of Wisconsin Press.
- Clark, Kenneth (1969). Civilization: A Personal View. New York: Harper & Row. ISBN 0-06-010800-2. LCCN 75-97174.
- Claus, Peter J.; Diamond, Sarah; Mills, Margaret Ann, eds. (2003). "Karma". South Asian Folklore: An Encyclopedia: Afghanistan, Bangladesh, India, Nepal, Pakistan, Sri Lanka. Routledge. ISBN 978-0-415-93919-5.
- Collins, Steven (1994). Reynolds, Frank; Tracy, David (eds.). Religion and Practical Reason. State University of New York Press. ISBN 978-0791422175.
- Contempory Civilization Staff of Columbia College (1954) [1948]. Chapters in Western Civilization. Vol. 1 (2nd ed.). New York: Columbia University Press.
- Contreni, John G. (1984). "The Carolingian Renaissance". In Treadgold, Warren T. (ed.). Renaissances before the Renaissance: cultural revivals of late antiquity and the Middle Ages. p. 59.
- Corbin, Henry (1993) [1964]. History of Islamic Philosophy (PDF). Translated by Sherrard, Liadain. London & New York: Kegan Paul International.
- Cross, Frank Leslie; Livingstone, Elizabeth A. (2005). "Great Schism". The Oxford Dictionary of the Christian Church. Oxford: University Press. ISBN 978-0-19-280290-3.
- Descartes, René (1984) [1641]. "Meditations on First Philosophy". The Philosophical Writings of René Descartes. Vol. 2. Translated by Cottingham, J.; Stoothoff, R.; Murdoch, D. Cambridge: Cambridge University Press. pp. 1–62.
- Deutsch, Eliot; Bontekoei, Ronald (1999). A Companion to World Philosophies. Wiley Blackwell.
- Donald, Merlin (1993). Origins of the Modern Mind: Three Stages in the Evolution of Culture and Cognition. Harvard University Press. OCLC 1035717909.
- Douglas, Alexander X. (2015). Spinoza and Dutch Cartesianism: Philosophy and Theology. Oxford: Oxford University Press.
- Doyle, William (1989). The Oxford History of the French Revolution. Clarendon Press. ISBN 978-0-19-822781-6.
- Dundas, Paul (2002) [1992]. The Jains (Second ed.). Routledge. ISBN 0-415-26605-X.
- Eco, Umberto (1990). The Limits of Interpretation. Indiana University Press. ISBN 0-253-31852-1.
- Flood, Gavin (1996). An Introduction to Hinduism. Cambridge: Cambridge University Press. ISBN 0-521-43304-5.
- Flood, Gavin (2012). The Importance of Religion: Meaning and Action in Our Strange World. John Wiley & Sons. ISBN 978-1405189712.
- Förster, Eckart; Melamed, Yitzhak Y., eds. (2012). Spinoza and German Idealism. Cambridge: Cambridge University Press.
- Froude, James Anthony (1895). Short Studies on Great Subjects. Vol. 1. London: Longmans, Green, & Co. – via Google Books.
- Galilei, Galileo (1974). Two New Sciences. Translated by Drake, Stillman. Madison: University of Wisconsin Press.
- Ganeri, Jonardon (2023-11-05). "Analytic Philosophy in Early Modern India". In Zalta, Edward N. (ed.). Stanford Encyclopedia of Philosophy (Winter 2023 ed.). § 2.2 Vaiśeṣika Atomism. ISSN 1095-5054. OCLC 429049174.
- Garfield, Jay L.; Edelglass, William (2011). The Oxford Handbook of World Philosophy. Oxford University Press. ISBN 978-0-19-532899-8.
- Gay, Peter (1996). The Enlightenment: An Interpretation. W. W. Norton & Company. ISBN 0-393-00870-3.
- Gilson, Etienne (1991). The Spirit of Medieval Philosophy (Gifford Lectures 1933-35). Notre Dame, Indiana: University of Notre Dame Press. ISBN 978-0-268-01740-8.
- Gottlieb, Anthony (2016). The Dream of Enlightenment: The Rise of Modern Philosophy. London: Liveright Publishing [W. W. Norton & Company].
- Grant, Edward (1996). The Foundations of Modern Science in the Middle Ages: Their Religious, Institutional, and Intellectual Contexts. Cambridge University Press. ISBN 978-0-521-56762-6.
- Gregorian, Vartan (2003). Islam: A Mosaic, Not a Monolith. Brookings Institution Press. ISBN 0-8157-3283-X.
- Guthrie, W. K. C. (1962). A History of Greek Philosophy. Vol. 1. Cambridge University Press.
- Hampshire, Stuart (1956). The Age of Reason: The 17th Century Philosophers (Selected, with Introduction and Commentary ed.). New York: Mentor Books [New American Library].
- Hannam, James (2011). The Genesis of Science. Regnery. ISBN 978-1-59698-155-3.
- Hassan, Ahmad Y. (1996). Sharifah Shifa Al-Attas (ed.). Factors Behind the Decline of Islamic Science After the Sixteenth Century. Islam and the Challenge of Modernity, Proceedings of the Inaugural Symposium on Islam and the Challenge of Modernity: Historical and Contemporary Contexts, Kuala Lumpur, August 1–5, 1994. International Institute of Islamic Thought and Civilization (ISTAC). pp. 351–99. Archived from the original on 2 April 2015.
- Hasse, Dag Nikolaus (2025-12-03). "Influence of Arabic and Islamic Philosophy on the Latin West". In Zalta, Edward N. (ed.). Stanford Encyclopedia of Philosophy (Winter 2025 ed.). ISSN 1095-5054. OCLC 429049174.
- Hayek, F. A. (2012). Law, Legislation and Liberty: A New Statement of the Liberal Principles of Justice and Political Economy. Taylor & Francis. ISBN 9780203103814.
- Heine, Heinrich (1836). On the History of Religion and Philosophy in Germany.
- Hegel, Georg Wilhelm Friedrich (1895). Lectures on the History of Philosophy. Vol. 3. Translated by Haldane, Elizabeth S.; Simson, Frances H. London: Kegan Paul, Trench, Trübner & Co.
- Huenemann, Charles; Gennaro, Rocco J., eds. (1999). New Essays on the Rationalists. New York: Oxford University Press.
- Huff, Toby E. (2016). Rise of early modern science: Islam, China, and the West (2nd ed.).
- Jaini, Padmanabh S. (2001). Collected papers on Buddhist Studies. Motilal Banarsidass. ISBN 978-8120817760.
- Jaspers, Karl (2014). The Origin and Goal of History. Routledge Revivals. Taylor and Francis. ISBN 978-1-317-83261-4. OCLC 876512738.
- Javanaud, Katie (2013). "Is The Buddhist 'No-Self' Doctrine Compatible With Pursuing Nirvana?". Philosophy Now. No. 97.
- Keith, Arthur Berriedale (2007). The Religion and Philosophy of the Veda and Upanishads. Motilal Banarsidass Publishers. ISBN 978-81-208-0644-3. Archived from the original on 30 June 2020.
- King, David A. (1983). "The Astronomy of the Mamluks". Isis. 74 (4): 531–55. doi:10.1086/353360. S2CID 144315162.
- Kumar, Raj (2008). Encyclopaedia Of Untouchables: Ancient Medieval And Modern. Gyan Publishing House. ISBN 9788178356648.
- Lavanam (2007). "Indian Materialism, Ancient". In Flynn, Tom; Dawkins, Richard (eds.). The New Encyclopedia of Unbelief. Prometheus. pp. 420–421. ISBN 978-1591023913.
- Lavaert, Sonja; Schröder, Winfried, eds. (2016). The Dutch Legacy: Radical Thinkers of the 17th Century and the Enlightenment. Leiden: Brill.
- Leaman, Oliver (2000). Eastern Philosophy: Key Readings. Routledge. p. 251. ISBN 978-0415173582.
- Leaman, Oliver, ed. (2006). "Shruti". Encyclopaedia of Asian Philosophy. Routledge. p. 503. ISBN 978-0415862530.
- Lewes, George Henry (1846). A Biographical History of Philosophy. Vol. 3 & 4.
- Lewis, James (2002). The Encyclopedia of Cults, Sects, and New Religions. Prometheus Books.
- Lo, Ping-cheung (1999). "Confucian Ethic of Death with Dignity and Its Contemporary Relevance". The Annual of the Society of Christian Ethics. 19. Society of Christian Ethics: 313–333. doi:10.5840/asce19991916. PMID 11913447.
- Lochtefeld, James (2002). "Ajivika" (PDF). The Illustrated Encyclopedia of Hinduism. Vol. 1: A–M. Rosen Publishing. ISBN 978-0823931798.
- Loeb, Louis E. (1981). From Descartes to Hume: Continental Metaphysics and the Development of Modern Philosophy. Ithaca, New York: Cornell University Press.
- Long, Jeffrey D. (2009). Jainism: An Introduction. Macmillan. ISBN 978-1845116255.
- Loy, David (1982). "Enlightenment in Buddhism and Advaita Vedanta: Are Nirvana and Moksha the Same?". International Philosophical Quarterly. 23 (1): 65–74.
- Lyotard, Jean-François (1989). The Lyotard reader. Oxford, UK / Cambridge, Massachusetts: Blackwell. ISBN 0-631-16339-5.
- Maier, Anneliese (1982). "Galileo and the Scholastic Theory of Impetus". On the Threshold of Exact Science: Selected Writings of Anneliese Maier on Late Medieval Natural Philosophy. Philadelphia: University of Pennsylvania Press. pp. 103–123. ISBN 0-8122-7831-3.
- Manfred, Albert Zakharovich, ed. (1974). A Short History of the World. Vol. 1. Translated by Judelson, Katherine. Moscow: Progress Publishers. OCLC 1159025.
- Marx, Karl; Engels, Friedrich (1844). The Holy Family.
- McGrath, Alister (2008). The Twilight Of Atheism: The Rise and Fall of Disbelief in the Modern World. Random House. ISBN 978-1407073767.
- Melamed, S. M. (1933). Spinoza and Buddha: Visions of a Dead God. University of Chicago Press.
- Michaels, Axel (2004). Hinduism: Past and Present. Princeton University Press. ISBN 0-691-08953-1.
- Mohanty, J. N. (2001). Gupta, Bina (ed.). Explorations in Philosophy. Vol. 1. Oxford University Press. pp. 107–108.
- Monfasani, John (2016). Renaissance Humanism, from the Middle Ages to Modern Times. Taylor & Francis. ISBN 978-1-351-90439-1.
- Moody, Ernest A. (1951). "Galileo and Avempace: The Dynamics of the Leaning Tower Experiment (I)". Journal of the History of Ideas. 12 (2): 163–93. doi:10.2307/2707514. JSTOR 2707514.
- Mukherjee, Rila; Chattopadhyay, Kunal (2005). Europe in the second millenium: a hegemony achieved?. University of California. ISBN 9788180640841.
- Mura, Andrea (2012). "The Symbolic Function of Transmodernity". Language and Psychoanalysis. 1 (1): 68–87. doi:10.7565/landp.2012.0005 (inactive 28 January 2026).
- Nasr, Seyyed Hossein (2007). The Garden of Truth. New York: HarperCollins. ISBN 978-0-06-162599-2.
- Nelson, Janet L. (1986). "On the limits of the Carolingian renaissance". Politics and Ritual in Early Medieval Europe. London: Bloomsbury Press. p. 49. ISBN 9780907628590.
- Nicholson, Andrew J. (2010). Unifying Hinduism: Philosophy and Identity in Indian Intellectual History. Columbia University Press.
- Nock, A. D. (1929). "'Studien zum antiken Synkretismus aus Iran und Griechenland' by R. Reitzenstein, H. H. Schaeder, Fr. Saxl". The Journal of Hellenic Studies. 49 (1): 111–116.
- Novotny, Franticek; Svoboda, Ludvik (1977). The Posthumous Life of Plato. Translated by Fabryova, Jana. Springer Science & Business Media. ISBN 978-94-009-9704-2.
- Nuyen, A. T. (1992). "The Role of Rhetorical Devices in Postmodernist Discourse". Philosophy & Rhetoric. 25 (2). Penn State University Press: 183–194. JSTOR 40237717.
- Nyden-Bullock, Tammy (2007). Spinoza's Radical Cartesian Mind. Continuum.
- Oloruntoba-Oju, Omotayo (December 2012). "Pan Africanism, Myth and History in African and Caribbean Drama". Journal of Pan African Studies. 5 (8): 190 ff. Archived from the original on 2015-10-29 – via Questia.
- Outram, Dorinda (2006). Panorama of the Enlightenment. Getty Publications. ISBN 978-0892368617.
- Pereboom, Derk, ed. (1999). The Rationalists: Critical Essays on Descartes, Spinoza, and Leibniz. Lanham, Maryland: Rowman & Littlefield.
- Phemister, Pauline (2006). The Rationalists: Descartes, Spinoza and Leibniz. Malden, Massachusetts: Polity Press.
- Pipes, Daniel (1992). Greater Syria. Oxford University Press. ISBN 9780195363043.
- Plott, John C.; Dolin, James Michael; Hatton, Russell E. (2000). Global History of Philosophy. Vol. 1: The Axial Age. Motilal Banarsidass. ISBN 978-8120801585.
- Prasad, R. (2009). A Historical-developmental Study of Classical Indian Philosophy of Morals. Concept Publishing. pp. 345–347. ISBN 978-8180695957.
- Robinson, Howard; Weir, Ralph (2026-08-19). "Dualism". In Zalta, Edward N. (ed.). Stanford Encyclopedia of Philosophy (Fall 2026 ed.). ISSN 1095-5054. OCLC 429049174.
- Quack, Johannes (2014). Bullivant, Stephen; Ruse, Michael (eds.). The Oxford Handbook of Atheism. Oxford University Press. ISBN 978-0199644650.
- Ray, Reginald (1999). Buddhist Saints in India. Oxford University Press. ISBN 978-0195134834.
- Razwy, Sayed Ali Asgher (1997). A Restatement of the History of Islam & Muslims – C.E. 570–661. Middlesex, UK: World Federation of KSI Muslim Communities.
- Riché, P.; Verger, J. (2006). "IV, La Troisième Renaissance caroligienne" [The Third Carolingian Renaissance]. Des nains sur des épaules de géants : Maîtres et élèves au Moyen Âge [Dwarves on the shoulders of giants: Masters and students in the Middle Ages] (in French). Paris: Tallandier.
- Riepe, Dale (1996). Naturalistic Tradition in Indian Thought. pp. 227–246. ISBN 978-8120812932.
- Roberson, Rusty (2016). "Enlightened Piety during the Age of Benevolence: The Christian Knowledge Movement in the British Atlantic World". Church History. 85 (2): 246. doi:10.1017/S0009640716000391. S2CID 163961032.
- Ruggiero, Guido (15 April 2008). A Companion to the Worlds of the Renaissance. John Wiley & Sons. ISBN 9780470751619. Archived from the original on 8 November 2016.
- Russell, Bertrand (1946). A History of Western Philosophy. London: George Allen & Unwin.
- Saliba, George (1994). A History of Arabic Astronomy: Planetary Theories During the Golden Age of Islam. New York University Press. ISBN 0-8147-8023-7.
- Satish, Chandra (2005). Medieval India: Textbook in History for Class XI. NCERT. ISBN 81-7450-395-1.
- Schelling, Friedrich Wilhelm (1833). On the History of Modern Philosophy.
- Schopenhauer, Arthur (1859). The World as Will and Idea.
- Schopenhauer, Arthur (1974). "Sketch of a History of the Doctrine of the Ideal and the Real". Parerga and Paralipomena: Short Philosophical Essays. Vol. 1. Translated by Payne, E. F. J. Oxford: Oxford University Press. p. 1. ISBN 0-19-824508-4.
- Sidwell, Kenneth (1995). Reading Medieval Latin. Cambridge University Press.
- Smith, Brian K. (1998). Reflections on Resemblance, Ritual, and Religion. Motilal Banarsidass. ISBN 978-81-208-1532-2.
- Steiner, George (1998). "6: Topologies of culture". After Babel (3rd revised ed.). pp. 489–490.
- Strazzoni, Andrea (2018). Dutch Cartesianism and the Birth of Philosophy of Science: A Reappraisal of the Function of Philosophy from Regius to 's Gravesande, 1640–1750. Berlin: De Gruyter.
- Subtelny, Maria Eva (November 1988). "Socioeconomic Bases of Cultural Patronage under the Later Timurids". International Journal of Middle East Studies. 20 (4): 479–505. doi:10.1017/S0020743800053861. S2CID 162411014.
- Tabatabaei, Sayyid Mohammad Hosayn (1979). Shi'ite Islam. Translated by Seyyed Hossein Nasr. State University of New York Press. ISBN 978-0-87395-272-9.
- Torfing, Jacob (1999). New theories of discourse: Laclau, Mouffe, and Z̆iz̆ek. Oxford, UK; Malden, Massachusetts: Blackwell Publishers. ISBN 0-631-19557-2.
- Trimingham, J. Spencer (1998) [1971]. The Sufi Orders in Islam. Oxford University Press. ISBN 9780198028239 – via Google Books.
- Trompf, G. W. (1973). "The concept of the Carolingian Renaissance". Journal of the History of Ideas: 3ff.
- Urwick, Edward Johns (1920). The message of Plato: a re-interpretation of the "Republic". Methuen & Co. Ltd. ISBN 9781136231162. Archived from the original on 27 October 2013.
- Verbeek, Theo (1992). Descartes and the Dutch: Early Reactions to Cartesian Philosophy, 1637–1650. Carbondale, Illinois: Southern Illinois University Press.
- Wadia, A. R. (1956). "Socrates, Plato and Aristotle". In Radhakrishnan, Sarvepalli (ed.). History of Philosophy Eastern and Western. Vol. II. George Allen & Unwin Ltd.
- Watson, Peter (2009) [2005]. Ideas: a History of Thought and Invention, from Fire to Freud. Folio Society. OCLC 417149155.
- Weber, Eugen (1992). Movements, Currents, Trends: Aspects of European Thought in the Nineteenth and Twentieth Centuries.
- Wherry, E. M. (1896). A Comprehensive Commentary on the Quran and Preliminary Discourse.
- Whitley, C. F. (Sep 1957). "The Date and Teaching of Zarathustra". Numen. 4 (3): 219–223. doi:10.2307/3269345. JSTOR 3269345.
- Zafirovski, Milan (2010). The Enlightenment and Its Effects on Modern Society.
