= Sabri Esat Siyavuşgil =

Turkish writer (1907–1968)

- Born: 1907; Istanbul, Ottoman Empire
- Died: October 6, 1968 (aged 61); Istanbul, Turkey
- Resting place: Zincirlikuyu Cemetery
- Occupations: Writer, translator
- Writing career
- Language: Turkish

Sabri Esat Siyavuşgil, (born 1907, Istanbul – d. 6 October 1968, Istanbul) was a Turkish poet, writer, psychologist, translator, encyclopedist.

== Biography ==
He was born in Istanbul. His father is Ahmet Esat, a descendant of Siyavuş Pasha, one of the Ottoman grand viziers. He completed primary school in Antalya. He continued his secondary education at Kadıköy Sultani, Istanbul Male Teacher's School, and Istiklal High School. He went to France when he was in the last year of Istiklal High School. He studied philosophy and psychology at the Universities of Dijon and Lyon and earned his doctorate.

== Bibliography ==
- Odalar ve Sofalar (1933)
- Psikoloji ve Terbiye Bahisleri (1940)
- Tanzimat’ın Fransız Efkar-ı Umumiyesi’nde Uyandırdığı Yankılar (1940)
- Karagöz (1941, Fransızca 1951, İngilizce 1955)
- Folklor ve Millî Hayat (1943)
- Roman ve Okuyucu (1944)
