= Intellectual history =

Study of the history of human ideas and of intellectuals

Intellectual history, or the history of ideas, is the study of the history of human thought and of intellectuals, people who conceptualize, discuss, write about, and concern themselves with ideas. The investigative premise of intellectual history is that ideas do not develop in isolation from the thinkers who conceptualize and apply those ideas; thus the intellectual historian studies ideas in two contexts: (i) as abstract propositions for critical application; and (ii) in concrete terms of culture, life, and history.

As a field of intellectual enquiry, the history of ideas emerged from the European disciplines of Kulturgeschichte (Cultural History) and Geistesgeschichte (Intellectual History) from which historians might develop a global intellectual history that shows the parallels and the interrelations in the history of critical thinking in every society. Likewise, the history of reading, and the history of the book, about the material aspects of book production (design, manufacture, and distribution) developed from the history of ideas.

The concerns of intellectual history are the intelligentsia and the critical study of the ideas expressed in the texts produced by intellectuals; therein the difference between intellectual history from other forms of cultural history that study visual and non-verbal forms of evidence. In the production of knowledge, the concept of the intellectual as a political citizen of public society dates back to the 19th century, referring to someone who is professionally engaged with critical thinking; if their work is of notable relevance to the general public or aims to improve society, such a person is sometimes called a public intellectual. Nonetheless, anyone who explored his or her thoughts on paper can be the subject of an intellectual history.

== History of the discipline ==
Intellectual history developed from the history of philosophy and cultural history as practiced since the times of Voltaire (1694–1778) and Jacob Burckhardt (1818–1897). The scholarly efforts of the eighteenth century can be traced to The Advancement of Learning (1605), Francis Bacon's call for what he termed "a literary history". In economics, John Maynard Keynes (1883–1946) was both a historian of economic thought, and the subject of study by historians of economic thought, because of the significance of the Keynesian Revolution.

The contemporary understanding of intellectual history emerged in the immediate postwar period of the 1940s, in its earlier incarnation as "the history of ideas" under the leadership of Arthur Lovejoy, the founder of the Journal of the History of Ideas. Since that time, Lovejoy's formulation of "unit-ideas" was developed in different and divergent intellectual directions, such as contextualism, historically sensitive accounts of intellectual activity in the corresponding historical period, which investigative shift is reflected in the replacement of the term "history of ideas" with the term "intellectual history".

Intellectual history is multidisciplinary and includes the history of philosophy and the history of economic thought. In continental Europe, the pertinent example of intellectual history is Begriffsgeschichte (History of Concepts, 2010), by Reinhart Koselleck. In Britain the history of political thought has been a particular focus since the late 1960s, and is especially associated with historians at Cambridge, such as John Dunn and Quentin Skinner, who studied European political thought in historical context, emphasizing the emergence and development of concepts such as the State and Freedom. Skinner is known for provocative, methodological essays that give prominence to the practice of intellectual history.

In the United States, intellectual history encompass different forms of intellectual production, not just the history of political ideas, and includes fields such as the history of historical thought, associated with Anthony Grafton (Princeton University) and J. G. A. Pocock (Johns Hopkins University). Formally established in 2010, the doctorate in History and Culture at Drew University is one of few graduate programs specializing in intellectual history, in the American and European contexts. Despite the pre-eminence of early modern intellectual historians (those studying the age from the Renaissance to the Age of Enlightenment), the intellectual history of the modern period also has been very productive on both shores of the Atlantic Ocean, e.g. The Metaphysical Club: A Story of Ideas in America (2001), by Louis Menand and The Dialectical Imagination: A History of the Frankfurt School and the Institute of Social Research, 1923–50 (1973), by Martin Jay.

== Methodology ==
=== The Lovejoy approach ===
The historian Arthur O. Lovejoy (1873–1962) coined the phrase history of ideas, and initiated its systematic study, in the early decades of the 20th century. Johns Hopkins University was a "fertile cradle" to Lovejoy's history of ideas; he worked there as a professor of history, from 1910 to 1939, and for decades he presided over the regular meetings of the History of Ideas Club. Another outgrowth of his work is the Journal of the History of Ideas. Aside from his students and colleagues engaged in related projects (such as René Wellek and Leo Spitzer, with whom Lovejoy engaged in extended debates), scholars such as Isaiah Berlin, Michel Foucault, Christopher Hill, J. G. A. Pocock, and others have continued to work in a spirit close to that with which Lovejoy pursued the history of ideas. The first chapter of Lovejoy's book The Great Chain of Being (1936) lays out a general overview of what he intended to be the programme and scope of the study of the history of ideas.

==== Unit-idea ====
In the History of Ideas, Lovejoy used the unit-idea (concept) as the basic unit of historical analysis. The unit-idea is the building block of the history of ideas; though relatively stable in itself, the unit-idea combines with other unit-ideas into new patterns of meaning in the context of different historical eras. Lovejoy said that the historian of ideas is tasked with identifying unit-ideas and with describing their historical emergence and development into new conceptual forms and combinations. The methodology of the unit-idea means to extract the basic idea from a work of philosophy and from a philosophical movement, with the investigative principles of the methodology being: (1) assumptions, (2) dialectical motives, (3) metaphysical pathos, and (4) philosophical semantics. The principles of methodology define the overarching philosophical movement in which the historian can find the unit-idea, which then is studied throughout the history of the particular idea.

The British historian Quentin Skinner criticized Lovejoy's unit-idea methodology as a "reification of doctrines" that has negative consequences. That the historian of ideas must be sensitive to the cultural context of the texts and ideas under analysis. Skinner's historical method is based upon the theory of speech acts, proposed by J.L. Austin. In turn, scholars criticized Skinner's historical method because of his inclination to reify social structures and sociological constructs in place of the historical actors of the period under study. The philosopher Andreas Dorschel said that Skinner's restrictive approach to ideas, through verbal language, and notes that ideas can materialize in non-linguistic media and genres, such as music and architecture. The historian Dag Herbjørnsrud said that "the Skinner perspective is in danger of shutting the door to comparative philosophy, and the search for common problems and solutions across borders and time."

The historian Peter Gordon said that unlike Lovejoy's practise of the History of Ideas, the praxis of Intellectual History studies and deals with ideas in broad historical contexts. That unlike historians of ideas and philosophers, intellectual historians, "tend to be more relaxed about crossing the boundary between philosophical texts and non-philosophical contexts . . . [Intellectual historians regard] the distinction between 'philosophy' and 'non-philosophy' as something that is, itself, historically conditioned, rather than eternally fixed." Therefore, intellectual history is a means for reproducing a historically valid interpretation of a philosophical argument, by implementation of a context in which to study ideas and philosophical movements.

=== Foucault's approach ===
Michel Foucault rejected narrative, the historian's traditional mode of communication, because of what he believed to be the shallow treatment of facts, figures, and people in a long period, rather than deep research that shows the interconnections among the facts, figures, and people of a specific period of history. Foucault said that historians should reveal historical descriptions through the use of different perspectives of the "archaeology of knowledge", whose historical method for writing history is in four ideas. First, the archaeology of knowledge defines the period of history through philosophy, by way of the discourses among thought, representation, and themes. Second, that the notion of discontinuity has an important role in the disciplines of history. Third, that discourse does not seek to grasp the moment in history, wherein the social and the persons under study are inverted into each other. Fourth, that Truth is not the purpose of history, but the discourse contained in history.

=== Global intellectual history ===
In the 21st century, the field of global intellectual history has received increased attention. In 2013, Samuel Moyn and Andrew Sartori published the anthology Global Intellectual History. In 2016, the Routledge journal Global Intellectual History (edited by Richard Whatmore) was established. J. G. A. Pocock and John Dunn are among those who recently have argued for a more global approach to intellectual history in contrast to Eurocentrism.

== See also ==
- Cambridge School (intellectual history)
- Free-floating intellectuals
- Great Conversation
- History of mentalities
- Philosophy of mind
- Sociology of knowledge
- Warsaw School (history of ideas)
