= Samim Kocagöz =

Turkish writer

- Born: 13 February 1916; Söke, Ottoman Empire
- Died: 5 September 1993 (aged 77); İzmir, Turkey
- Occupation: Writer

Samim Kocagöz (born 13 February 1916, Söke – 5 September 1993, İzmir), was a Turkish novelist.

== Biography ==
He graduated from Istanbul University, Faculty of Literature, Department of Turkish Language and Literature in 1942. Between 1942 and 1945 he studied art history at the University of Lausanne. After returning to Turkey, he taught literature at Izmir Trade School and art history at the State Conservatory for a while. He was engaged in farming in Söke.

After 1950, he settled in İzmir. His first novel, *Second World*, was published in 1938. He is known for his short stories, *Telli Kavak*, *Kalpaklılar*, and others, published in magazines such as *Servet-i Fünun*, *Uyanış*, *Ses*, *Hep*, *Bu Topraktan*, *Vatan*, *Fikirler*, *Yenilikler*, *Yeditepe*, and the newspaper *Demokrat İzmir*. His novels *Kalpaklılar* and *Dolu Dizgin* are works that address the Turkish War of Independence. In 1950, he won first prize in the World Short Story Competition, jointly organized by the newspapers Yeni İstanbul and the New York Herald Tribune, with his short story *Uncle Sam*. In 1989, he won the Orhan Kemal Novel Award with his novel *Eski Toprak*. He reflected the problems, daily lives, and emotions of village and townspeople with a simple language and realistic approach. After his death, a short story award was established in his name. He settled in İzmir after 1950. In the 2006-2007 theater season, the Izmir State Theater, celebrating its 50th anniversary, staged the author's almost unknown play, "Wet Bread." Samim Kocagöz was the brother of the poet Halil Kocagöz and the short story writer Ferzan Gürel.

== Bibliography ==
=== Novel ===
- İkinci Dünya
- Bir Şehrin İki Kapısı
- Yılan Hikayesi
- Onbinlerin Dönüşü
- Kalpaklılar
- Doludizgin
- Bir Karış Toprak
- Bir Çift Öküz
- İzmir'in İçinde
- Tartışma
- Mor Ötesi
- Eski Toprak

=== Story ===
- "Telli Kavak"
- "Sam Amca"
- "Sığınak"
- "Cihan Şoförü"
- "Ahmet'in Kuzuları"
- "Yolun Üstündeki Kaya"
- "Yağmurdaki Kız"
- "Alandaki Delikanlı"
- "Gecenin Soluğu"
- "Koca Öküzün Ölümü"
