= Cemil Meriç =

Turkish author and translator

- Born: Hüseyin Cemil; 12 December 1916; Reyhanlı, Ottoman Empire
- Died: 13 June 1987 (aged 70); Istanbul, Turkey
- Resting place: Karacaahmet Cemetery, Istanbul, Turkey
- Occupations: Writer and translator
- Writing career
- Language: Turkish, French, English, and Arabic
- Notable work: Bu Ülke (This Country)

Hüseyin Cemil Meriç (12 December 1916 – 13 June 1987) was a Turkish writer and translator who wrote various articles in social sciences and contributed to Turkish literature with his twelve books in the twentieth century.

Meriç sharply criticized the Turkish Language Association's campaign aimed at purging the Turkish language of Middle Eastern impact, wherein he famously declared, "kamus namustur," (Note: The dictionary is honor) arguing that the substitution of well-rooted vocabulary with an artificial language (uydurukça) cuts off generations from their cultural and literary heritage.

== Early life ==
He was born in Reyhaniye (today's Reyhanlı) in 1916. He was the child of a family who had migrated from Dimetoka during the Balkan Wars. His father, Mahmut Niyazi Bey, who was a judge in Dimetoka, and his mother was Zeynep Ziynet Hanım. His father Mahmut Niyazi Bey served as the Head of Ziraat Bank Directorate and the head of court in Antakya. Cemil Meriç, who lived in Antakya until the age of seven, returned to Reyhanlı with his family after his father left the office. After finishing primary school in Reyhanlı High School, he went to Antakya again. He studied in Le Lycée d'Antakya, which implemented a French education system in the city under the French administration. While at this school, his eyes were found to be 6 degrees myopic. His first article, "A Late Accounting" was published in the local Yenigün newspaper. When he was in his twelfth grade, he had to leave school without getting a high school diploma because of his nationalist attitude in a published article and his criticism of some of his teachers. He went to Pertevniyal High School in Istanbul to continue his high school education. Meanwhile, he met with the leftist intellectuals of the period, especially Nâzım Hikmet and Kerim Sadi.

He returned to Iskenderun in 1937 because of his poverty. After working as a primary school teacher in Haymaseki village for nine months, he became the deputy chief of the Translation Office in İskenderun the same year. In 1938, he worked as a primary school teacher in Batı Ayrancı Village, as a secretary at the Turkish Aeronautical Association and as a clerk in the municipality. He was arrested in April 1939 for the overthrow of the Hatay government and taken to Antakya; He was put on trial for a death sentence; He was acquitted two months later. In 1940, he was accepted as a scholarship student to the School of Foreign Languages at Istanbul University. He studied in this institution for two years. Beginning in 1941, he started publishing articles in the journals such as Insan and Yücel.

He was appointed as a French teacher at Elazığ High School in 1942; Just before going there, he met and married the teacher Fevziye Menteşeoğlu. Exempted from military service due to the high myopia in both eyes, Meriç published his first translation book Honoré de Balzac's La Fille aux yeux d'or in 1943.

== His lectureship and loss of sight ==
Due to his wife not being appointed and the death of his two children in Elazığ, he left his teaching position and went to Istanbul. His son Mahmut Ali was born in 1945 and his daughter Ümit was born the following year. Meriç, who started to work as a French lecturer at Istanbul University in 1946, continued to teach in French until his retirement in 1974; meanwhile, he published articles in the journal Yirminci Asır for a year (1947). Translated Victor Hugo's play, Hermani, in verse (1948); he taught French at Işık High School (1952–1954).

When he completely lost his eyesight as a result of an accident in the spring of 1954, he went to Marseille alone in 1955 and then to Paris after a few failed eye surgeries. When the six-month treatment failed, he returned home. He was depressed for a while because he lost his sight completely, but with the help of his surroundings he started to read and write again.

== Writing period ==
After losing his eyesight, his most productive age of writing began. He verbally translated the French and English texts which he read to those around him and printed them to his assistants. He prepared an unpublished French grammar and continued to write articles in the same manner. Since 1963, he taught sociology and cultural history at the Department of Sociology at Istanbul University and carried his lectures and seminars until his retirement. He started his diaries, which he continued for twenty years with intervals, in 1963. His first completed book Hint Edebiyatı (Indian Literature) was published in 1964. Starting out with the idea of writing a world literature, Meriç started with Iranian literature but then turned to Indian literature. The work, which aims to break down the prejudices against Eastern civilizations and has emerged as a result of a four-year study, was published twice more under the title Bir Dünyanın Eşiğinde (Turkish: On the Verge of a World). He aimed to illuminate an important aspect of Western thought after Indian Literature. With this in mind, he wrote a work about Saint Simon, who was one of the leading figures of sociology, but had a hard time finding a publishing house to print. His work was at last published in 1967.

Between 1965 and 1973, his articles and translations were published in various magazines. He wrote essays entitled Fildişi Kulesinden(Turkish: From the Ivory Tower) in the Hisar magazine. He was also a contributor to the Hareket magazine. He retired from Istanbul University and embarked on a new life in his library. That year, he received an award from the Turkish National Cultural Foundation. He published his book Bu Ülke (Turkish: This Country) in 1976. The book consists of his aphorisms regarding various ideas, cultural and literary issues. He stated "It seems to me that I came to this thing called life in order to write this book."

Meriç gave conferences until 1984 and his work Kırk Ambar (Turkish: Forty Warehouse) was awarded the National Cultural Foundation Prize in Turkey.

== Later life ==
Meriç, who lost his wife Fevziye Hanım in 1983, suffered a brain hemorrhage in the August of the same year and paralyzed his left side. His last works published were Işık Doğudan Gelir (1984) and Kültürden İrfana (1985). He died on 13 June 1987, and his body was buried in Karacaahmet Cemetery.

The house where he was born in Reyhanlı district of Hatay has been turned into a museum.

== Works ==
=== Reviews ===
- Hint Edebiyatı (Indian Literature) (1964),
- Saint Simon: İlk Sosyolog, İlk Sosyalist (First Sociologist, First Socialist) (1967),
- Bir Dünyanın Eşiğinde (On the Verge of a World) (1976),
- Işık Doğudan Gelir (The Light Comes from the East) (1984),
- Kültürden İrfana (From Culture to Knowledge) (1985)

=== Essays ===
- Mağaradakiler (Cavers) (1978),
- Bu Ülke (This Country) (1974, 1985)
- Umrandan Uygarlığa (From Prosperity to Civilization) (1974)

=== Diaries ===
- Journal I (1992)
- Journal II (1994)

=== Other books ===
- Kırk Ambar (Forty Warehouses) (1980),
- Bir Facianın Hikâyesi (The Story of a Disaster) (1981),
- Sosyoloji Notları ve Konferanslar (Sociology Notes and Conferences) (1993)
