= Richard Seaford =

British classicist (1949–2023)

Professor Richard Seaford
- Born: 1949
- Died: 6 December 2023 (aged 73–74)

Academic work
- Discipline: Classicist
- Sub-discipline: Ancient Greek culture
- Institutions: University of Exeter

Richard Seaford was a British classicist. He was professor emeritus of Classics and Ancient History at the University of Exeter. His work focused on ancient Greek culture, especially that of ancient Athens. He died in December 2023.

== Career ==
Seaford published widely on Greek literature and religion, from Homer to the New Testament, and especially on the god Dionysos. His book Money and the Early Greek Mind. Homer, Tragedy, Philosophy (2004) explores the role of money on ancient Greek culture, which he suggested was the first culture to become pervasively monetised. He argued that the introduction of coinage, which occurred around the end of the 7th century BCE, provided a crucial stimulus for the advent of Greek philosophy, in which a universal substance is (like money) transformed from and into everything else.

In 2005–2008 he was awarded a Leverhulme Major Research Fellowship for a study of Aeschylus. For 2013-4 he was awarded an AHRC Fellowship for a comparative historical study of early Indian with early Greek thought.

== Political views ==
Seaford accepted the Palestinian request to support the international academic boycott of Israel and declined an invitation to review a book for the Israeli journal Scripta Classica Israelica. In a report carried by the European Jewish Press he cited "the brutal and illegal expansionism and the slow-motion ethnic cleansing" by the state of Israel. The report quoted him further: "I am aware of the honest arguments for and against a boycott, and that even some Israeli academics support the boycott and many do not. Whatever your views, I hope you will understand that my view is based on a widely shared moral outrage."

== Selected publications ==
- Pompeii (Summerfield Press; New York : distributed by Thames & Hudson, 1978) ISBN 0-8467-0572-9
- Euripides Cyclops with Introduction and Commentary (Oxford [Oxfordshire] : Clarendon Press; New York : Oxford University Press, 1984) ISBN 0-19-814030-4
- Reciprocity and Ritual: Homer and Tragedy in the Developing City-state (Oxford [England] : Clarendon Press; New York : Oxford University Press, 1994) ISBN 0-19-814949-2
- Euripides Bacchae (Aris and Phillips, 1996)
- Reciprocity in Ancient Greece (co-editor with C. Gill and N. Postlethwaite) (Oxford; New York : Oxford University Press, 1998) ISBN 0-19-814997-2
- Money and the early Greek Mind: Homer, Tragedy, and Philosophy (Cambridge, UK; New York : Cambridge University Press, 2004) ISBN 0-521-83228-4
- Dionysos (London; New York : Routledge, 2006) ISBN 0-415-32488-2
- Cosmology and the Polis: the Social Construction of Space and Time in the Tragedies of Aeschylus (Cambridge, UK; New York : Cambridge University Press, 2012) ISBN 978-1-107-00927-1
- Tragedy, Ritual and Money in Ancient Greece. Selected Essays (Cambridge University Press, 2018) ISBN 978-1-107-17171-8
- The Origins of Philosophy in Ancient Greece and Ancient India. A Historical Comparison (Cambridge University Press, 2019) ISBN 978-1-108-499552-2
