= Ergenekon =

Ergenekon is a Turkish term that may refer to:

- The Epic of Ergenekon, the founding myth of Turkic and Mongolic peoples
- Necabettin Ergenekon (1926-2020), Turkish officer
- Ergenekon, Turkish name of Agios Chariton, a village in Cyprus
- Ergenekon (organization), an alleged clandestine, secular ultra-nationalist organization within Turkey
  - The Ergenekon trials, where said allegations reached the judicial system
  - Cases for reporting on Ergenekon
  - Weapons found in the Ergenekon investigation
