= Mahmut Yıldırım =

Turkish counter-guerrilla and spy

- Born: Mahmut Yıldırım; 3 May 1953 (age 73); Yenidal, Bingöl, Turkey
- Disappeared: 1998; Damascus, Syria
- Other names: Ahmet Demir; Yeşil (from Turkish, meaning "green")
- Citizenship: Turkey

Mahmut Yıldırım (born 3 May 1953) is a Turkish counter-guerrilla and spy of Zaza origin. Yildirim, who identified himself to the public as Ahmet Demir but was called by the code-name Yeşil among intelligence, disappeared in 1998. In 1999, he was the subject of an Interpol red notice. In 2013, military officer Korkut Eken claimed that he was still alive. Among the murders he is accused of is that of Cem Ersever in 1993.

== Investigation ==
According to former National Intelligence Organization (MİT) official Mehmet Eymür (speaking in 2011), Yeşil at one time worked for the MİT in Elazığ, but was later let go as he was "out of control." Eymür said that Yeşil later worked with the Turkish Gendarmerie's shadowy JİTEM unit until 1995, and "was given identification cards. Some of his cards even included the title of the 'Prime Ministry Intelligence'.". Eymür said that by 1995 Yeşil had again gotten "out of control" and was moved to Ankara, where he was introduced to Eymür (then head of the MİT's Counter-Terrorism Department), with Eymür unaware of Yeşil's status as a wanted criminal. Eymür said he used Yeşil in several operations, but only outside Turkey, and that he was never formally an agent. In 2012, the MİT told prosecutors (in a document leaked to the press) that it had used Yıldırım in four operations, including the one which captured Kurdistan Workers' Party (PKK) commander Şemdin Sakık in 1998. MIT later denied that Yıldırım was an MİT agent, and said it had never used Yıldırım inside Turkey.

In 2006 Mehmet Ali Birand said that JİTEM had asked Yıldırım to assassinate him, but that the operation was later cancelled after Yıldırım had already investigated Birand's home security. Birand said that MİT chief Şenkal Atasagun was one of those who had told him of this episode.

According to mob boss Sedat Peker speaking in 2011, MİT official Tarık Ümit was "kidnapped in retaliation for Yeşil having kidnapped two Iranian drug dealers [Iranian spies Lazım Esmaeili and Askar Simitko, abducted January 1995] in İstanbul at the time."

Ergenekon suspect Semih Tufan Gülaltay says Eymür introduced him to Yeşil.

Mahmut Yıldırım's son, Murat Yıldırım, published a book about him, Yeşil: Savaşçı ("Green: The Fighter"; Timas Publishing Group, 2009).

== Trial ==
Yıldırım was one of four people charged by a Diyarbakır court in 2013 with the 1992 murder of Musa Anter, with Yıldırım tried in absentia.

== See also ==
- List of fugitives from justice who disappeared

== Books ==
- Murat Yıldırım (2009), Yeşil: savaşçı, Timas Publishing Group
- Hakantürk (2006), Yeşil öldü mü?, Akademi TV
- Çetin Ağaşe (2006), Kod adı yeşil, Truva Yayinlari
