= Adil Serdar Saçan =

Turkish police chief (1962–2023)

- Born: 21 September 1962; Erzurum Province, Turkey
- Died: 24 May 2023 (aged 60); Istanbul, Turkey
- Education: Turkish National Police Academy; Istanbul University
- Occupations: Police officer, jurist
- Years active: 1985–2023
- Known for: Ergenekon trials

Adil Serdar Saçan (21 September 1962 – 24 May 2023) was a Turkish police chief who oversaw numerous high-profile investigations. He supervised the Istanbul police force's Anti-Smuggling and Organized Crime Department (Turkish: Organize Suçlarla Mücadele ve Kaçakçılık Şube Müdürlüğü), which he established in 1998.

Saçan was detained on 23 September 2008 for allegedly being a member of Ergenekon; an illegal gang. In August 2013 he was sentenced to 14 years and six months as part of the Ergenekon trials.

== Background and personal life ==
Adil Serdar Saçan was born on 21 September 1962 in Erzurum Province, Turkey. He graduated from police academy in 1985 as the top student. He had a master's degree in public administration from Istanbul University. In June 2008, he and his son Kerim Bedri survived an accident involving a truck. He died in Istanbul on 24 May 2023, at the age of 60.

== Career ==
Saçan led 600 investigations, including those of the Malki murders, Albayrak Holding, and Adnan Oktar. He has led raids against Sedat Peker, Alaattin Çakıcı, Sedat Şahin, Ayvaz Korkmaz, Kürşat Yılmaz, and the Ergin brothers.

== Ergenekon investigation ==
In 2001, he led the team that interrogated Tuncay Güney, exposing a criminal network called Ergenekon. The Ergenekon investigation at the time was allegedly torpedoed due to the intervention of vested interests. Saçan suspected Veli Küçük, an Ergenekon defendant; he was found in possession of documents intended to blackmail Saçan. Since the interrogation, Saçan has been fired six times and sued 39 times (acquitted on 36 counts, as of August 2008).

In September 2008, he himself was detained on charges of being a member. He was interrogated by prosecutor Mehmet Ali Pekgüzel for nearly twelve hours, in reference to the Gülenist clique inside the police force, and the thwarting of the Ergenekon investigation in 2001. He shared a cell with Tuncay Özkan and his former detainee, Sedat Peker.

The Fatih Second Criminal Court of First Instance sentenced Saçan to five months in prison on charges of taking confidential investigation documents into his own possession.

On 5 August 2013, he was sentenced to 14 years and six months as part of the Ergenekon trials.

== Death ==
Saçan died of lung cancer on 24 May 2023, at the age of 60.
