= Tarık Ümit =

Turkish intelligence official

- Born: 22 April 1947; Düzce, Turkey
- Died: 3 March 1995 (aged 47); Marmaris, Muğla Province, Turkey
- Occupation: Intelligence official
- Employer: National Intelligence Organization

Tarık Ümit (22 April 1947 in Düzce – 3 March 1995 in Marmaris) was a Turkish intelligence official in the National Intelligence Organization (MIT). He was kidnapped and murdered in March 1995.

== Career ==
After his father died, Ümit went to live in Germany to live with his uncle, returning to Turkey in 1968. He joined MIT in 1978, and in the interim is alleged to have associated with mob boss Dündar Kılıç.

Mehmet Eymür has been quoted as saying "Tarık Ümit, because of the way he was built, was difficult to manage. He was angry; he liked a fight. He worked at the MİT Presidency and also for the police force under orders from Mehmet Ağar. He was given a green passport, fake IDs and fake license plates while he worked for the police force. They used him to do some of their executions. I personally heard from him that he was assigned the murders of Savaş Buldan, Hacı Karay and Adnan Yıldırım."

According to Fikri Sağlar, Ümit was joint shareholder of the First Merchant Bank in the Turkish Republic of Northern Cyprus (founded 1993), with Kayzer Mahmood Butt, the private office manager of Saudi Prince Faisal.

== Death ==
According to Ayhan Çarkın, Ümit was killed by police special operations officers and buried in Tekirdağ (Çarkın says he helped transport the body). Former MIT official Mehmet Eymür has said that Ümit was killed because he had shown Eymür a "death list" of 40 names, some of whom (such as Behçet Cantürk) had already been assassinated, and that prior to Ümit's disappearance Ümit had been questioned by Abdullah Çatlı. Eymür reportedly told Ümit's daughter, Hande Birinci, that her father worked with Korkut Eken (an adviser to Mehmet Ağar) on the side and that he was assassinated by Ağar's men after he became disgusted by their corruption.

According to mob boss Sedat Peker speaking in 2011, Ümit was "kidnapped in retaliation for Yeşil having kidnapped two Iranian drug dealers [Iranian spies Lazım Esmaeili and Askar Simitko, abducted in January 1995 in Istanbul at the time."

== See also ==
- List of kidnappings
