= İlker Çınar =

İlker Çınar (c. 1968–1970) is a former intelligence agent of the Turkish Army, and a suspect and witness in the Ergenekon trials. He was a 'special sergeant' who went undercover with Christian missionaries in Turkey and worked as a priest in Tarsus. He later broke with the Christian missionary world, gaining wide media coverage for his claims that missionaries were supporting separatist movements, and in 2005 published a book, Ben Bir Misyonerdim, Şifre Çözüldü ("I was a Missionary, The Code is Broken"). Çınar's identity as a military intelligence agent was revealed by Bugün in June 2008, which showed he had been paid by the Army since 1992.

== Career ==
Çınar said in 2005 that he had converted to Christianity in 1987. He began his Christian education in 1993, and became head pastor of the International Protestant Church. In 2005 he announced that he had re-converted to Islam, and had received death threats as a result. He gained wide media coverage for his claims that missionaries were supporting separatist movements, and published a 2005 book, Ben Bir Misyonerdim, Şifre Çözüldü ("I was a Missionary, The Code is Broken").

Çınar's identity as a military intelligence agent was revealed by Bugün in June 2008, which showed he had been paid by the Army since 1992. Çınar said he at one time worked for the Land Forces Command. It was also reported that he received regular payments from JITEM.

Çınar told prosecutors in the Ergenekon trials that he had worked for the clandestine organization TUSHAD believing it an agency of the state, but now believed it to be the armed wing of the Ergenekon organization. Çınar said TUSHAD had elements within it named the "black", "white" and "orange" forces, that he had been part of the white forces, and that his instructor had been Levent Ersöz. A Turkish Protestant said that several years earlier Çınar had shown him a TUSHAD identity card, and that Çınar had protected him from a planned assassination. Çınar said he had been threatened by TUSHAD in 2008, and had seen his name on a death list.
