= Haşim =

Haşim is the Turkish spelling of the Arabic masculine given name Hashim. People with the name include:

- Haşim İşcan (1898–1968), Turkish politician
- Haşim Kılıç (born 1950), Turkish judge
- Ahmet Haşim (1884–1933), Turkish poet

== Other ==
- Hasim, Saudi Arabia
