= TUSHAD =

Alleged clandestine organization within the Turkish Armed Forces

TUSHAD (Turkish: Türkiye Ulusal Stratejiler ve Harekât Dairesi, TUSHAD; English: National Strategies and Operations Department of Turkey) was a clandestine organization within the Turkish Armed Forces, including within the General Staff of Turkey. Prosecutors in the Ergenekon trials allege that it was set up in 1993 on instructions from Ergenekon, by then secretary-general of the General Staff Hurşit Tolon. Tolon has denied that TUSHAD ever existed.

The General Staff had denied its existence, but documents retrieved from the General Staff in 2013 described TUSHAD, including four reorganisations between 1995 and 2008, and its deactivation in 2008 under pressure from the Ergenekon investigation. Ergenekon suspect İlker Çınar told prosecutors that he had worked for TUSHAD believing it an agency of the state, but now believed it to be the armed wing of the Ergenekon organization. Çınar said TUSHAD had elements within it named the "black", "white" and "orange" forces, that he had been part of the white forces, and that his instructor had been Levent Ersöz. He also said that TUSHAD was still active in 2012. A Turkish Protestant said that several years earlier Çınar had shown him a TUSHAD identity card, and that Çınar had protected him from a planned assassination.

Prosecutors allege that TUSHAD carried out the Zirve Publishing House massacre in 2007. İlker Çınar told prosecutors that he had heard of the planned attack from retired Col. Mehmet Ülger, but that it was not clear that it would involve the killing of the publishers. According to Çınar, Ülger also linked the attack with the assassinations of Andrea Santoro (2006) and Hrant Dink (2007), describing them as "operations". The Zirve murders are claimed to be part of the "Cage Action Plan", which is being prosecuted in the Poyrazköy case of the Ergenekon trials. Çınar linked the murders with the 2007 E-memorandum.

Çınar has also said that President Turgut Özal was targeted by TUSHAD.

TUSHAD is also said to have worked with the Turkish Gendarmerie's JİTEM intelligence unit.

== See also ==
- Doğu Çalışma Grubu
