= Cases for reporting on Ergenekon =

Turkish criminal trials for journalists

There have been a number of trials arising from reporting on Ergenekon, with journalists accused of "violating the confidentiality of the investigation" into Ergenekon, or violating the judicial process of the Ergenekon trials (attempting to influence a trial). The European Commission said in 2010 that the number of cases was "a cause for concern."

Convictions for reporting include Şamil Tayyar, for his book Operasyon Ergenekon (20 months' imprisonment, suspended for five years); and Ahmet Can Karahasanoğlu, editor-in-chief of Vakit, sentenced to 30 months' imprisonment. Acquittals include the news coordinator of the daily Radikal, Ertuğrul Mavioğlu, and journalist Ahmet Şık, for a book entitled Kırk Katır, Kırk Satır.

== 2009 ==
The Ministry of Justice announced that by November 2009 court cases had been opened against 15 journalists on the grounds of "violating the confidentiality of the investigation". The Ministry furthermore declared that since 31 July 2009 3,845 investigations had been launched against journalists. 358 trials were pending and 15 cases resulted in convictions. In its 2010 report on progress for the accession of Turkey to the European Union the European Commission stated inter alia: "The high number of cases initiated against journalists who have reported on the Ergenekon case is a cause for concern. They face prosecutions and trials for violating the principle of confidentiality of an ongoing judicial process. This could result in self-censorship." The footnote 17 stated: "4,091 investigations have been initiated against journalists for breaches of the confidentiality of investigations or attempts to influence a fair trial (Articles 285 and 288 of the Turkish Criminal Code), following their reporting on the Ergenekon case."

In December 2009 Şamil Tayyar, author and journalist with the daily Star was sentenced to 20 months' imprisonment for his book Operasyon Ergenekon ("Operation Ergenekon") on the grounds that he had violated the duty to observe secrecy of an investigation and tried to influence a fair trial. Istanbul Penal Court 2 ruled that the defendant might not commit another crime and the announcement of the sentence could be suspended under the condition that the defendant is put under five years of supervision.

== 2010 ==
In April 2010 it was reported that over 180 cases had been opened against the daily Vakit (now Yeni Akit) for reporting on the Ergenekon investigations. Of these cases, 120 are related to not observing the secrecy of investigation (Article 285/1-3 of the Turkish Penal Code). In 17 cases the charges are influencing fair trial; in 30 cases the charges are insulting institutions (Article 125/3 of the Turkish Penal Code). In connection with an article on the killing of Üzeyir Garih that was allegedly committed by Ergenekon the editor-in-chief Ahmet Can Karahasanoğlu was sentenced to 15 months' imprisonment according to Article 285/1 of the Turkish Penal Code for having violated the duty to observe secrecy. The article had been published on 1 October 2008. Relating to the attack of PKK militants on the gendarmerie station Dağlıca in Yüksekova district, Hakkâri Province on 21 October 2007 Bakırköy Penal Code 2 once again sentenced Ahmet Can Karahasanoğlu to 15 months' imprisonment for having violated the duty to observe secrecy.

== 2011 ==
The news coordinator of the daily Radikal, Ertuğrul Mavioğlu and journalist Ahmet Şık were put on trial for a book entitled Kırk Katır, Kırk Satır ("Forty mules, forty lines") on allegations of having violated the duty to observe secrecy. Kadıköy Penal Court acquitted the defendants on 13 May 2011 stating that the crime had not materialized.

Another reporter of Radikal, İsmail Saymaz, was charged for an article of 8 June 2010 entitled "Love games at Ergenekon" (tr: Ergenekon’da Aşk Oyunu). He was accused with insult, influence of a fair trial and violating the duty to observe secrecy. The hearing was to start on 28 January 2011 at Bakırköy Penal Court 2. In a separate case Erzurum Penal Court 2 decided in April 2011 not to be responsible to hear the complaint of Prosecutor Osman Şanal (who indicted the Ergenekon defendants in Erzincan) that the journalists Ali Dağlar (Hürriyet), İsmail Saymaz (Radikal) and İlhan Taşçı (Cumhuriyet) had insulted him and sent the case to Istanbul, where they should be tried for insulting a civil servant and influencing a fair trial.

Radikal reporter İsmail Saymaz is charged in at least seven cases. Case 7 was launched for "violating the secrecy of an investigation" because of an article published in Radikal on 19 March 2008 entitled "The generals in their summer residences agree that Balbay is the left-wing leader". Saymaz was facing imprisonment of up to 60 years in total. The first hearing of this trial was held on 3 June 2010 at Bakırköy Penal Court 2 according to Article 285 of the Turkish Criminal Code (TCK) (Violations of Communications). Previously, a further six trials were filed against Saymaz for his article about the interrogations of İlhan Cihaner, detained Chief Public Prosecutor of Erzincan and İbrahim Şahin, former Deputy Head of the Special Operations Department. Another reason for the prosecution of Saymaz was the article entitled "The most reckless state of Ergenekon is in Erzincan" related to the defence of former İliç Public Prosecutor Bayram Bozkurt which was sent to the Ministry of Justice. Bozkurt is tried at the Erzincan High Criminal Court under allegations of "misconduct in office".

Editor-in-chief of the daily Akşam, Mustafa Dolu and former editor Semra Pelek were indicted, because they had published the testimony of Ergenekon defendant, retired General İbrahim Fırtına on 5 January 2010. Bakırköy Penal Court held hearings on 1 November 2010 and 29 March 2011. The next hearing was scheduled for 11 August 2011. After previous trials against İsmail Saymaz, Serkan Ocak and Ertan Kılıç on the grounds of reporting about the Ergenekon investigation and related hearings, now Pelek and Dolu are facing heavy prison sentences as well.

Kadıköy Penal Court 2 is hearing the case of Burhan Ekinci from the daily Taraf, because he published a report of Istanbul Police HQ of 13 November 2009 on the connection of defendants to the killings of Christians in Malatya. There was one hearing on 11 November 2010. Among the 43 cases heard at Kadıköy Penal Court 2, 39 are directed at staff of the daily.

On 1 February 2011 Bakırköy Penal Court 2 started to hear the case of Rıdvan Kaya, chair of the Association for Thought and Education Rights (short in Turkish: Özgür-Der) and the editors-in-chief of the daily Vakit, Ahmet Can Karahasanoğlu and Kenan Kıran charged with insulting civil servants, showing them as target and influencing fair trial. The case is related to their comments on the rejection to release Mehmet Haberal, but the releases of İlhan Cihaner and 14 defendants in the sledgehammer (balyoz) case. The next hearing was scheduled for 23 May 2911.
