= İşcan =

İşcan is a Turkish masculine given name as well as a surname. Notable people with the surname include:

- Dilan Deniz Gökçek İşcan (born 1976), Turkish female football official
- Elit İşcan (born 1994), Turkish film actress
- Eray İşcan (born 1991), Turkish footballer
- Haşim İşcan (1898-1968), Turkish educator, province governor and the first elected mayor of Istanbul
