= Alaettin Çakıcı =

Turkish Mafia boss (born 1953)

- Born: 20 January 1953 (age 73); Arsin, Trabzon, Turkey
- Occupations: Crime boss, hitman
- Children: Ali Çakıcı
- Relatives: Gencay Çakıcı
- Status: Out of prison
- Convictions: Assault with a firearm, contracting a murder, member of a criminal organization
- Penalty: 36 years and 10 months' imprisonment

Alaettin Çakıcı (born 20 January 1953) is one of the leading figures of the Turkish mafia, a convicted felon and a former member of the ultra-nationalist Grey Wolves in Turkey.

Initially employed by the Turkish National Intelligence Organization for covert operations outside Turkey in the 1980s, contracting assassinations, he went underground from 1992-1998, was arrested and imprisoned for 2 years, arrested again and imprisoned for 16 years. Çakıcı is the arch rival of mafia boss Sedat Peker. After Çakıcı’s release in 2020, Peker left the country and exposed Çakıcı's connections to former members of the Erdogan cabinet, like Mehmet Ağar.

== Early life and education ==
Alaettin Çakıcı was born in Arsin, Trabzon, Turkey on 20 January 1953. His family later moved to Istanbul and settled in the Gültepe neighborhood, reportedly because of a blood feud. According to journalist Faruk Bildirici, Çakıcı experienced difficulties during his primary school years due to repeatedly fighting's and twice changing schools.

== Career ==
Mehmet Eymür, a leading official of the Turkish National Intelligence Organization (MİT), disclosed that he was the first person to employ Alaettin Çakıcı of the MİT. Yavuz Ataç, an operations official, confirmed that he was introduced to Alaettin Çakıcı. Two months later he joined the MİT in May 1987 as the manager of the security department. Ataç said "Çakıcı has been a fugitive, sought for six or seven crimes at the time he first met him". According to Ataç, Çakıcı was assigned to operations outside of Turkey.

As determined by the security forces, Çakıcı was in 1995 on the assassination list of Dev Sol, a Marxist–Leninist organization.

=== Political ties and scandals ===
Çakıcı contracted the assassination of Cavit Çağlar, a wealthy businessman from Bursa and a high-level politician and government minister, and Mehmet Üstünkaya, former president of Beşiktaş JK, in relation with the incidents known as the "Türkbank scandal", in connection with the privatization of Türk Ticaret Bankası to Korkmaz Yiğit. The plot was uncovered by the police at the preparation stage. He has close ties to Devlet Bahçeli, the president of the far-right political party MHP who visited him in prison and who in 2018 demanded a general amnesty for certain prisoners, naming Çakıcı personally. The demand was denied by the government, though.

=== Abroad (1992–1998) ===
Çakıcı fled abroad in 1992 with the help of a false passport. It was determined that he toured in Belgium, United States, Italy, South Africa, France, Brazil, Singapore and Japan. He is held responsible for the murder of 41 people.

=== Arrest in France (1998) ===
Informed by the Turkish police, French police apprehended him on 17 August 1998 in a hotel in Nice, France together with his bodyguard Muradi Güler and his courier Aslı Fatoş Ural, daughter of composer Selçuk Ural. He had been carrying a fake diplomatic passport (red passport) on the name of "Nedim Caner" and US$17,000 cash with him.

His capture revealed his connections not only to the intelligence service, but also to high-level politicians and the deep state in Turkey. Recording tapes published after his capture in 1998 in France led to the resignation of the government minister from the Motherland Party (ANAP) Eyüp Aşık, who was accused of warning Çakıcı to flee. Meral Akşener, minister of interior from the True Path Party (DYP), MİT agent Yavuz Ataç and businessman Erol Evcil were also accused of the same allegation. After 16 months of isolated incarceration in France, he was returned to Turkey of his own will on 14 December 1999. He was imprisoned in Kartal Prison in Istanbul. Following controversies with rival gang member inmates, he was transferred to the maximum-security Kandıra prison in Kocaeli.

In June 2000 he was sentenced to five years for running a criminal gang.

=== Abroad (2003–2004) ===
Çakıcı was released from prison on 1 December 2002. Although not allowed to leave Turkey and his passport confiscated, he fled from Antalya to Greece by sea as told by a group of people, including his nephew and Erol Evcil, who were apprehended by the police in Foça, İzmir. Çakıcı had obtained a passport with false identity and photograph from the police in Ümraniye, Istanbul.

=== Arrest in Austria (2004) ===
Çakıcı stayed four-and-a-half months in Paris and Strasbourg in France as observed by the Turkish police. In order to visit Ali Çakıcı, son from his first marriage, in a hospital in Graz, he drove to Austria changing his car three times on the way. His intention was to pass later to Italy to join his girlfriend Aslı Fatoş Ural. On 14 July 2004 Austrian police, informed by the Turkish police, apprehended Çakıcı out of Graz. He had been carrying a Turkish special passport (green passport) issued on the name Faik Meral, a retired MİT agent, and its expiration extended from the police in İzmir. He had EUR 4,000 in cash with him. Visas in his passport showed that he traveled first to Russia and then entered Germany, where he stayed a while before going to France.

On 14 October 2004, Çakıcı was deported from Austria at the request of the Turkish Ministry of Justice. He was brought from Vienna to Istanbul in a commercial airliner escorted by five policemen. After trial, he was imprisoned in the maximum-security prison in Tekirdağ.

=== Trials (2004–2020) ===
After his return to Turkey, Çakıcı was put on trial, and found guilty of the following crimes:

- Three years and four months' imprisonment for his contract to shoot the renowned journalist Hıncal Uluç, as he had written a newspaper column about him and his wife Uğur Kılıç he was about to divorce.
- Three years and four months' imprisonment for organized crime in relation with the gunned assault on 26 March 2000 to the club local of Fatih Karagümrük S.K. in Istanbul.
- Nineteen years and two months' imprisonment for his contract to murder his ex-wife.
- Ten years and ten months' imprisonment for the gunned assault at the speculator Adil Öngen's car.

=== Release, 2020 ===
On 15 April 2020, he was released after the Turkish parliament approved a law to contain the spread of the COVID-19 in the prisons. After Çakıcı's release, Peker left the country and exposed Çakıcı's connections to former members of the Erdogan cabinet, like Mehmet Ağar.

== Personal life ==
In 1991, Çakıcı made his second marriage with Nuriye Uğur Kılıç, the daughter of Dündar Kılıç, a mob boss of the Turkish underworld sports nicknamed the "godfather of godfathers" (Turkish: Babaların Babası). However, he and his father-in-law fell out following the chain of incidents known as the "Civangate". In November 1994, the couple divorced. He contracted the killing of his ex-wife Uğur Kılıç and his ex-henchman Nurullah Tevfik Ağansoy. On 20 January 1995, she was shot dead with seven bullets fired by the hitman Abdurrahman Keskin in front of her son Onur in Uludağ, a ski resort in Bursa. It was on Çakıcı's birthday.
