= Yavuz Ataç =

Turkish intelligence official

Yavuz Ataç is a former Turkish intelligence official in the National Intelligence Organization (MİT), best known for his relationship with Alaattin Çakıcı. A former head of MİT Foreign Operations, he was "sent into exile" in Beijing on 24 October 1997, and recalled in August 1998. He was forced to resign not long after this, when it was discovered that he had provided Çakıcı with a red "government official" passport.

== Career ==
According to Sedat Ergin of Hurriyet, "It was an open secret in Ankara that Ataç was the person who had "recruited" Çakici to MİT and served as his "liaison." ... According to sources close to the government, during an inquiry conducted in the past, Atac had reportedly admitted that MİT had provided Çakici with his first red passport in the early 1980s at a time Çakici was being used for certain activities directed against the Armenian militant organization ASALA in France." Ataç confirmed to a parliamentary commission in 2000 that Çakici had served MİT and had been answerable to him.

Ataç was "sent into exile" in Beijing on 24 October 1997. In discussions between Çakıcı and businessman Erol Evcil it was made clear that Ataç should be appointed to a higher position in MİT - possibly his old post as Head of Foreign Operations.

Alaattin Çakıcı was apprehended in France in August 1998 carrying a red "government official" passport issued by Ataç at the Turkish Embassy in Beijing. Ataç was recalled to Ankara shortly afterwards. Atac said he had had the passport delivered to Cakici in Malaysia. Ataç had also spoken to Cakici and tried to help him evade capture.

After these events became public, the wife of Mehmet Eymür told the press that MİT undersecretary Senkal Atasagun had sent Çakıcı abroad with Ataç to conduct operations. She also said that "My husband [Mehmet Eymur] repeatedly requested that Yavuz Atac be dismissed from MİT for his involvement with the underworld. Yavuz Ataç is a representative of the crime world within MİT who continuously provided information to Çakici."

Çakıcı had allegedly threatened the Prime Minister, if he did not return Ataç from China and appoint him head of MİT.

"Mehmet Cemal Kulaksizoglu was found to be the mastermind behind the Akın Birdal assassination attempt and is known to be involved in activities for the revitalization of the illegal Turkish Revenge Brigade (TİT). Semih Tufan Gulaltay, one of the gang leaders involved in the Akın Birdal assassination attempt, stated at the court hearing that Kulaksizoglu maintained close cooperation with a MİT member named Yavuz Ataç. "Kulaksizoglu often went to Beijing to visit Yavuz Ataç," disclosed Gulaltay. Another fugitive, Oya Kaya, once told the police that her boyfriend, Kulaksizoglu, is so loyal to Atac that he would not hesitate to kill his own children if Atac requested him to do so." " ..."In accordance with Avci's statements, Nurullah Tevfik Agansoy's escape was organized by MİT officer Yavuz Ataç"

In 2010 Ataç testified in the trial of Hanefi Avcı, as Avcı had wiretapped Ataç among others. In 2011 he testified to a prosecutor investigating extrajudicial killings in the 1990s, including the Susurluk scandal.
