= Türkbank scandal =

Turkish political scandal in 1998

The Turkbank scandal was a political scandal in 1998 surrounding the relationship between the Turkish government, the private sector, and organized crime that led to the resignation of the prime minister Mesut Yılmaz and his cabinet in early 1999. It took place during the privatization process of Türk Ticaret Bankası (TTB), aka Türkbank.

== Background ==
Established as a regional bank by private investors under the name Adapazarı İslam Ticaret Bankası in 1913, Türkbank became the first private bank of Turkey. Following the Turkish financial crisis, which blew up in January 1994, and the devaluation of the Turkish currency at hundred percent, the bank weakened, which operated 274 branches and employed 4,532 staff nationwide at that time. The bank was taken under control by the Treasury in May of the same year. The bank's 84.52% stake was taken over by the Savings Deposit Insurance Fund of Turkey (Turkish: Tasarruf Mevduatı Sigorta Fonu, TMSF) for sale in a public tender.

The TMSF requested for tender on May 4, 1998. On May 18, Police of Istanbul applied to the State Security Court (Turkish: Devlet Güvenlik Mahkemesi) to obtain a permission to eavesdrop businessman Korkmaz Yiğit's mobile phone for the length of one month due to reasonable grounds on his existing ties with and money transfer to organized crime.

On August 4, Yiğit's construction company with his Bank Ekspres placed the highest bid of US$600 million for the majority stake, followed by US$595 million of Zorlu Holding controlling Denizbank. Right after the accomplishment of the tender process, the police notified the TMSF in writing about the relationship between Yiğit and the mob boss Alaattin Çakıcı, and Çakıcı's threatening other bidders of the tender.

Korkmaz Yiğit (born 1943) was a self-made businessman, who owned two banks, two newspapers and three television channels at that time, all acquired not a long time ago. Alaattin Çakıcı (born 1953), a former member of the ultra-nationalist organization Grey Wolves and one of the leading mobs of the Turkish underworld, was a fugitive since 1992, sought for several crimes. Çakıcı had connection with businessman Erol Evcil, who had tried to purchase Türkbank in 1995.

On August 17, 1998, Çakıcı was apprehended in France upon request by the Turkish Police, and extradited to Turkey. Fikri Sağlar, a deputy of the Republican People's Party (CHP) in the opposition and a former Minister of Culture, received a recording tape by mail on August 29, which contained a conversation between Yiğit and Çakıcı about the Türkbank tender. On October 8, Sağlar submitted the recording tape to his friend Tuncay Özkan, the news director of Kanal D, for broadcasting on the TV. As Kanal D did nothing in the meantime, Sağlar disclosed the private conversation at a press conference on October 13. Thereupon, the TMSF annulled the tender for Türkbank sale on October 15, 1998.

== Downfall of Yılmaz cabinet and trial ==
Yiğit was taken to the Organized Crime Department of Istanbul Police, where he presented a testimony of five pages on November 12, in which he confessed all his connections and unlawful doings related to the tender process. The scandal spread over to the politics when some information from Yiğit's testimony leaked to the public. It became apparent that Prime minister Mesut Yılmaz and Minister of State responsible for Economy Güneş Taner were involved in the scandal. Yiğit claimed that "Yılmaz and Taner encouraged him to buy Türkbank, and offered him loans from other state banks to ensure that his bid was the highest". He was arrested, tried and imprisoned, losing all his assets during this time.

Right after the political scandal emerged, the Grand National Assembly of Turkey formed a parliamentary investigation committee. Yılmaz was invited to testify before the committee. The coalition cabinet led by Yılmaz was brought to fall by motion of no confidence on January 11, 1999.

After hearing several politicians and journalists, the parliamentary committee prepared an investigative report, which blamed Yılmaz for conspiring to rig bids on tender. However, the report became obsolate due to the upcoming 1999 general election to be held on April 18. After the 2002 general election on November 3, the Justice and Development Party (AKP) and CHP both pushed the suspended corruption cases, including the Türkbank scandal. On December 9, 2002, a parliamentary committee was formed, which heard further witnesses involved in the tender process, and investigated the allegations against Yılmaz and Taner once again. Accomplished on June 25, 2004, the thousands-page report concluded Yılmaz and Taner of bid rigging, and proposed their trial at the Constitutional Court of Turkey (Turkish: Yüce Divan), which is the supreme court for trials of high-ranking politicians in Turkey.

The parliament assembly accepted the report by 429 votes in favour of the total 447 present in the 550-seat parliament (276 votes would have been sufficient) on July 13, 2004. Yılmaz asked for his trial before the independent Constitutional Court. On July 23, the Constitutional Court rejected the submission on the grounds that the case has to be separated for both defendants. The parliament decided on October 27 to send the two politicians separately to the Constitutional Court. Mesut Yılmaz became so the first prime minister ever to stand trial in the Constitutional Court of Turkey.

The highest court ruled on June 23, 2006 that on some of the allegations relating to their term of office and responsibilities, Mesut Yılmaz (June 30, 1997 – January 11, 1999) and Güneş Taner (June 30, 1997 – November 25, 1998) are guilty of bid rigging as per Turkish Penal Code's Article 765 Section 205. However, the sentences were reprieved in accordance with applicable laws.
