= Hurşit Tolon =

Turkish general (born 1942)

Commander of the First Army of Turkey
- In office 20 August 2004 – 19 August 2005
- Preceded by: Yaşar Büyükanıt
- Succeeded by: İlker Başbuğ

Personal details
- Born: Ahmet Hurşit Tolon; 3 August 1942 (age 83) Istanbul, Turkey
- Spouse: Ayla Tolon
- Children: 1

Military service
- Branch/service: Turkish Army
- Years of service: 1962–2005
- Rank: General

Ahmet Hurşit Tolon (born 3 August 1942) is a retired Turkish general who served as the Commander of the First Army of Turkey from 2004 to 2005. In August 2013 he was sentenced to aggravated life imprisonment as part of the Ergenekon trials.

== Military career ==
He was promoted to brigadier general in 1989. As a brigadier-general he was Chief of General Staff General Secretariat and Commander 28 Motorised Infantry Brigade. In 1993 he was promoted to the rank of Major General. Chief of General Staff General Secretariat in this rank, he served as Vice Commander of the Gendarmerie Public Order Corps Commander and Deputy Commander 7th Corps. In 1997, he was promoted to lieutenant general. He was Commander 15th Corps and General Staff Logistics President while at this rank.

Tolon is accused of establishing the National Strategies and Operations Department of Turkey (TUSHAD) in 1993 on instructions from Ergenekon, while Tolon was serving as secretary-general of the General Staff of Turkey. Prosecutors allege that TUSHAD carried out the Zirve Publishing House massacre in 2007. TUSHAD is also said to have worked with the Turkish Gendarmerie's JİTEM intelligence unit. The Zirve murders are claimed to be part of the "Cage Action Plan", which is being prosecuted in the Poyrazköy case of the Ergenekon trials.

Tolon is said to have attended meetings of Semih Tufan Gülaltay's National Unity Party.

Tolon graduated from the Turkish Military Academy in 1962 and the Kara Harp Akademisi in 1978.
