= Yeşil =

Yeşil (green in Turkish) may refer to:

- Mahmut Yıldırım (born 1953), Turkish contract killer also known as "Yeşil"
- Samed Yeşil (born 1994), German-Turkish footballer
- Yeşilırmak River, a river in northern Turkey
