= Erol Evcil =

Turkish businessman (born 1966)

- Born: 1966 (age 59–60)
- Occupation: Businessman

Erol Evcil (born 2 May 1966, Mudanya, Bursa Province), is a Turkish businessman convicted of money-laundering and ordering a murder. Coming from an olive-growing background, he became known as the "olive king", and founded Zeytinoglu Holding in the late 1980s. In the 1990s he employed many former high-ranking state officials, and won state privatization tenders. He was a millionaire by age 25, and top of the police "most wanted" list by age 30. At the height of his success he had three private planes (which he lent freely to politicians and public officials), and a famous singer (Gülben Ergen) as a girlfriend, and was one of the most famous people in Turkey.

He went into hiding in 1998 after his business empire, much of it based on bank loans running into hundreds of millions of dollars obtained fraudulently, began to unravel. He was arrested in April 1999, charged with ordering the 1997 murder of Nesim Malki, and convicted in 2004. He was a friend of Alaattin Çakıcı and Mehmet Ağar, and had done business with Cavit Çağlar, Korkmaz Yiğit, Orhan Taşanlar and Yavuz Ataç. In 2013 he was sentenced to 15 years for money-laundering.

== Career ==
Evcil came from an olive-growing background, he became known as the "olive king", and founded Zeytinoglu Holding in the late 1980s, becoming known as a major exporter. In the 1990s he employed many former high-ranking state officials, and won state privatization tenders. On 27 August 1994 he obtained a court order officially changing his surname to "Esrefoglu", but continued to use his old surname in all his transactions.

In 1991 Evcil attempted to obtain a bank loan from Türkiye İş Bankası, but was turned down. After setting up a company with relatives of key bank officials, Evcil's Erev Tekstil company was able to obtain a TL125bn loan. The capital of Evcil's olive products company, Eze Zeytincilik, grew by the same amount on the same day. Eze Zeytincilik had been set up with a $50m loan from moneylender Nesim Malki. Eze Zeytincilik claimed to be a successful exporter, but its factory was still under construction in 1995, and records of alleged sales achieved showed prices a third higher than other Turkish companies were able to charge. The fraud continued until Evcil's debts exceeded $100m and Evcil was unable to even keep up with the interest payments, at which point Is Bank began to investigate. Investigations were stymied by the bank's attempts to protect leading bank officials. Evcil's Eze Zeytincilik was confiscated by Is Bank in mid-1997, with the facility and lands estimated to be worth $4m, against $140m credit advanced for investments in the company. He had also obtained credit from a dozen other banks and financial institutions, including $75m from Türk Ticaret Bankası.

He was arrested in Bursa in April 1999, after Bursa's General Directorate of Security police raided a house in an area in the jurisdiction of the Turkish Gendarmerie, without informing them. He had been hiding there for around a year. According to Sabah and Radikal, interior minister Sadettin Tantan discovered Evcil was hiding in Bursa, and after some political difficulty moved the Bursa Governor Orhan Taşanlar and the Bursa Chief of Police, Kemal Bayrak, to positions outside Bursa. Only then did he order the new Chief of Police to detain Evcil. Evcil later admitted that he had received warning of an earlier raid, from a high-ranking Bursa police officer. He also said he ordered the murder of moneylender Nesim Malki because he realised he could not pay him back.

Evcil was charged with ordering the murder of Nesim Malki, and convicted in 2004. In 2013 he was sentenced to 15 years for money-laundering.
