= Zirve Publishing House murders =

2007 multiple murder in Malatya, Turkey

- Location: 38.3482°N 38.3154°E; Malatya, Turkey
- Date: April 18, 2007
- Target: Zirve Kitabevi (Zirve Publishing House)
- Attack type: Mass stabbing
- Weapon: Knife
- Deaths: 3
- Victims: Pastor Necati Aydın; Uğur Yüksel; Tilmann Geske
- Perpetrators: Yunus Emre Günaydın and four accomplices
- Motive: Islamic terrorism

The Zirve Publishing House murders, called the Missionary Massacres by Turkish media, took place on April 18, 2007, in Zirve Publishing House, Malatya, Turkey. Three employees of the Bible publishing house were attacked, tortured, and murdered by five Muslim assailants.

== Attack ==
Gökhan Talas, the chief witness and a Protestant, came with his wife to the office. The door was locked from inside which was quite unusual. Suspecting that something had happened, he called Uğur Yüksel not knowing that he was inside tied to a chair. Yüksel replied and said that they were in a hotel for a meeting. Talas heard someone crying in the background during his talk with Yüksel, and decided to call the police, who arrived soon thereafter. According to Talas, the attackers killed Yüksel and Aydın after the police arrived.

== Victims ==
Two of the victims, Necati Aydın, 36, and Uğur Yüksel, 32, were Turkish converts from Islam. The third man, Tilmann Geske, 45, was a German citizen. Necati Aydın was an actor who played the role of Jesus Christ in a theater production that the TURK-7 network aired over the Easter holidays.

Aydın was survived by his wife and two children, Geske was survived by his wife and three children. Yüksel was engaged.

Necati Aydın was a graduate of the Martin Bucer Seminary whose president Thomas Schirrmacher said he simply cried when he learned of the deaths.

== Reactions ==
Turkish Prime Minister Recep Tayyip Erdoğan expressed his dismay, stating, "We are upset that such an atrocity took place in our country."

Frank-Walter Steinmeier, the German Foreign Minister, condemned the attacks strongly, affirming, "[We will] do everything to clear up this crime completely and bring those responsible to justice."

Niyazi Güney, Justice Ministry Statutes Directorate General Manager, commented on the incident, stating that "Missionary work is even more dangerous than terrorism and unfortunately is not considered a crime in Turkey."

The massacre prompted protests by Malatyaspor supporters during a soccer competition between Malatyaspor and Gençlerbirliği.

Following this incident, along with other high-profile hate crimes such as the assassination of Hrant Dink, hate crimes in Turkey began to receive more attention from activists.

== Court hearings ==
Eleven suspects were apprehended after the attack. The chief suspect, Yunus Emre Günaydın, was treated for serious wounds after he attempted to jump out of a window to escape police. All of the alleged killers were between 19 and 20 years old. Günaydın was born in 1988 in Malatya and had no previous convictions. One suspect confessed that "The leader of the group was Emre. It was he who devised the plan to kill them. We went to the publishing house together. When we entered the place, we tied them to their chairs and Emre slit their throats". According to another suspect, the victims knew Günaydın, as he regularly visited the publishing house. Another suspect added that they all knew each other. When apprehended, the suspects were carrying a note that said in part "We did it for our country. They are trying to take our country away, take our religion away."

The Malatya Peace Court (Nöbetçi Sulh Ceza Mahkemesi) ordered pre-trial detention for Hamit Çeker, Salih Güler, Abuzer Yıldırım, and Cuma Özdemir for the crimes of establishing a terrorist organization, being a member of a terrorist organization, homicide, and depriving people of their liberties. Turna Işıklı, Emre Günaydın's girlfriend, was also arrested for aiding a terrorist organization. The car which the attackers were planning to use during their escape was rented by Salih Güler. According to eyewitnesses, Günaydın and his four accomplices practiced shooting two days before the event.

After being released from hospital in May 2007, Günaydın admitted to his guilt in his first interrogation.

Malatya Heavy Penal Court No. 3 started to hear the case in 2008. On the tenth day of the hearing, Günaydın said that a journalist, Varol Bülent Aral, had told him that the missionary work was connected to the Kurdistan Workers Party (PKK). Günaydın stated, "He told me that Christianity and the missionary work done in its name had the goal of destroying the motherland. I asked him if someone should not stop this? He told me to then get up and stop this. I asked him how it could be done. He said they would provide us with the state support." The prosecutors then demanded a copy of the Ergenekon indictment concerning an alleged high-level cabal, and the judge agreed to request this from the Heavy Penal Court in Istanbul. Asked about a document that he was alleged to have written, Günaydın denied any connection with retired Major General Levent Ersöz, who was arrested with reference to the Ergenekon case, or the Istanbul president of an ultra-nationalist association, Levent Temiz.

On 13 February 2008 Amnesty International issued an urgent action on the lawyer Orhan Kemal Cengiz, a lawyer, who was threatened and intimidated because of his legal work on behalf of one of three men killed in April 2007. The organization stated that threats against the human rights defender intensified since November 2007, when the trial began of those accused of killing. The action was terminated, when the authorities provided a bodyguard for the lawyer.

At the 11th hearing, on 12 September 2008, the chief suspect's girlfriend, Turna Işıklı, said that she already knew before the murders that he was going to be under interrogation on the day after they were committed.

In November 2008 the judge presiding over the Malatya murder case, Eray Gürtekin, announced that the Malatya and Ergenekon indictments were to be merged.

On July 17, 2009 one of the witnesses who is in the custody of the gendarmerie failed to appear in court. Another witness also failed to appear in court at this time, claiming she was busy with university studies. On July 22, 2009 it was reported that a letter was sent to prosecutors in which it was stated that gendarmerie commander Colonel Mehmet Ülger instigated the murders.

In December 2010, a suspect in the Zirve case told the court that the National Strategies and Operations Department of Turkey (TUSHAD), the armed side of Ergenekon, is still planning attacks against non-Muslims in the country.

On 17 March 2011 the papers reported that the trial was merged with the main Ergenekon trial in Istanbul. On orders of the prosecutor in the Ergenekon trial, Zekeriya Öz, police operations were carried out in 9 provinces and the former commander of the gendarmerie in Malatya, Major Mehmet Ülger and another 19 people were detained.

At the end of June 2012, Turkish media reported that the indictment maintained that the murder was organized by a clandestine organization within the armed forces called the National Strategies and Operations Department of Turkey (TUSHAD), which was alleged to have been established in 1993 by Gen. Hurşit Tolon on instructions from Ergenekon, while Tolon was serving as secretary-general of the General Staff.

In 2013 evidence emerged that the Malatya Gendarmerie had carried out detailed surveillance of the Zirve Publishing House prior to the murders.

== Release ==
On 7 March 2014, five suspects who were still detained were released from their high-security prison and put under house arrest after a Turkish court ruled that their detention exceeded newly adopted legal limits.

== Sentence ==
The five perpetrators – caught red-handed at the crime scene – were handed three consecutive life sentences, two military personnel were given sentences of 13 years 9 months and 14 years 10 months and 22 days, and sixteen other defendants were acquitted.

== See also ==
- 2024 Istanbul church shooting
- Ergenekon
- Andrea Santoro
- Alevi massacres
- Luigi Padovese
- Constantinople pogroms
- List of massacres in Turkey
- Murder of Andrea Santoro
