= Governor of Bursa =

Governor of a Turkish Province

Governor of Bursa Bursa Valiliği
- Logo of the Governor of Bursa
- Incumbent; Erol Ayyıldız since August 20, 2024
- Appointer: President of Turkey; On the recommendation of the Turkish government
- Term length: No set term length or limit
- Inaugural holder: Ahmet Vefik Paşa; 1877
- Website: Office of the Governor

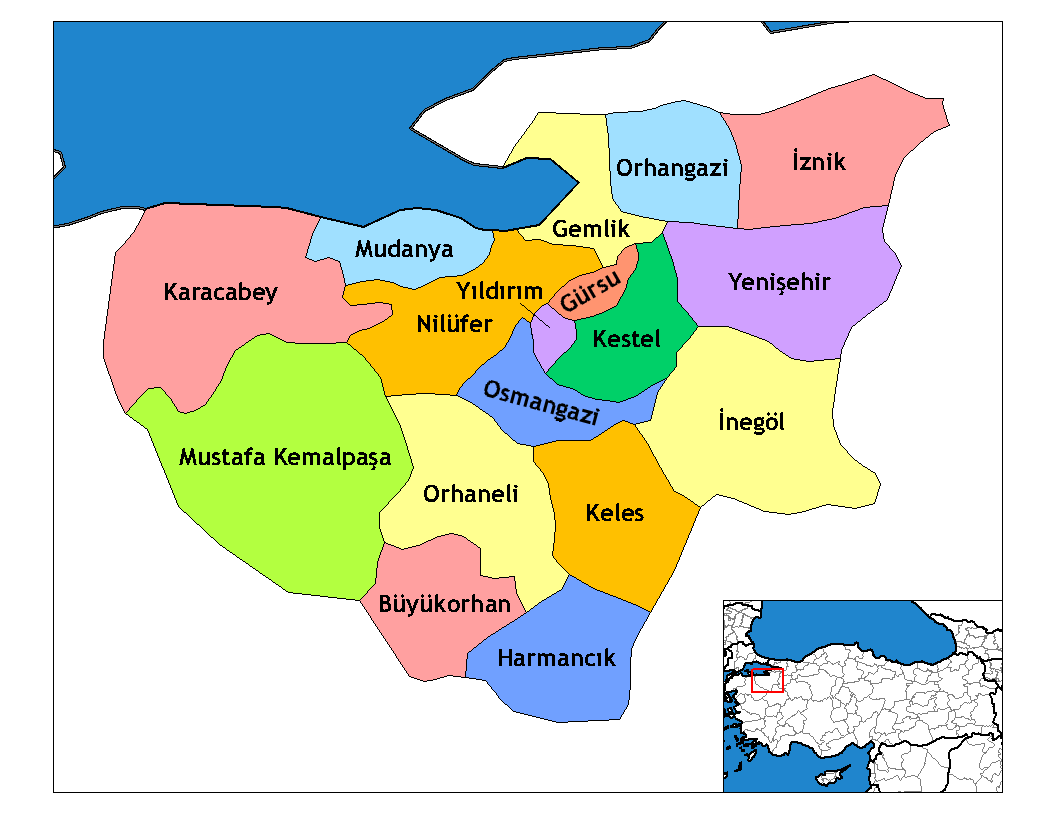
Map of the Province of Bursa, showing the provincial districts.

The governor of Bursa (Turkish: Bursa Valiliği) is the bureaucratic state official responsible for both national government and state affairs in the Province of Bursa. Similar to the governors of the 80 other provinces of Turkey, the governor of Bursa is appointed by the government of Turkey and is responsible for the implementation of government legislation within Bursa. The governor is also the most senior commander of both the Bursa provincial police force and the Bursa Gendarmerie.

== Appointment ==
The governor of Bursa is appointed by the president of Turkey, who confirms the appointment after recommendation from the Turkish government. The Ministry of the Interior first considers and puts forward possible candidates for approval by the cabinet. The governor of Bursa is therefore not a directly elected position and instead functions as the most senior civil servant in the Province of Bursa.

=== Term limits ===
The governor is not limited by any term limits and does not serve for a set length of time. Instead, the governor serves at the pleasure of the government, which can appoint or reposition the governor whenever it sees fit. Such decisions are again made by the cabinet of Turkey. The governor of Bursa, as a civil servant, may not have any close connections or prior experience in Bursa Province. It is not unusual for governors to alternate between several different provinces during their bureaucratic career.

== Functions ==
The governor of Bursa has both bureaucratic functions and influence over local government. The main role of the governor is to oversee the implementation of decisions by government ministries, constitutional requirements and legislation passed by the Grand National Assembly within the provincial borders. The governor also has the power to reassign, remove or appoint officials a certain number of public offices and has the right to alter the role of certain public institutions if they see fit. Governors are also the most senior public official within the province, meaning that they preside over any public ceremonies or provincial celebrations being held because of a national holiday. As the commander of the provincial police and Gendarmerie forces, the governor can also take decisions designed to limit civil disobedience and preserve public order. Although mayors of municipalities and councillors are elected during local elections, the governor has the right to re-organise or to inspect the proceedings of local government despite being an unelected position.

== List of governors of Bursa ==
Governors of Bursa
No.	Name	Took office	Left office
1	Hilmi Bey	14 April 1923	14 March 1924
2	Hasan Kemaleddin Gedeleç	24 March 1924	16 November 1926
3	Hüseyin Fatin Güvendiren	15 December 1926	17 June 1933
4	Zeynel Abidin Özmen	19 June 1933	28 May 1934
5	Fazlı Güleç	20 June 1934	19 August 1935
6	Refik Şefik Soyer	29 August 1935	25 May 1939
7	Refik Koraltan	7 June 1939	26 January 1942
8	Fazlı Güleç	10 February 1942	28 August 1945
9	Haşim İşcan	14 September 1945	1 August 1950
10	Mehmet Hilmi İncesulu	1 August 1950	8 December 1951
11	Cahit Ortaç	15 December 1951	12 December 1954
12	İhsan Sabri Çağlayangil	16 December 1954	31 May 1960
13	Rasim Gökbel	1960	1960
14	Fehmi Albayrak (Askeri Vali)	31 May 1960	13 June 1960
15	Turgut Başkaya	13 June 1960	4 August 1960
16	Daniyal Yurdatapan	12 August 1960	13 October 1960
17	Enver Kuray	13 October 1960	11 October 1962
18	Fahrettin Akkutlu	1 November 1962	27 June 1964
19	Vefa Poyraz	29 June 1964	18 January 1966
20	Celalettin Ünseli	20 January 1966	1 May 1967
21	Ertuğrul Ünlüer	5 June 1967	15 September 1968
22	Enver Saatçigil	23 October 1968	9 June 1971
23	Sedat Tolga	9 July 1971	23 July 1975
24	Mehmet Karasarlıoğlu	24 July 1975	17 February 1978
25	Ziya Çoker	19 February 1978	12 September 1979
26	M.Zekai Gümüşdiş	10 October 1979	2 May 1988
27	Erdoğan Şahinoğlu	15 August 1988	16 July 1991
28	Erol Çakır	16 July 1991	17 February 1992
29	Mehmet Necati Çetinkaya	17 February 1992	September 1993
30	Rıdvan Yenişen	September 1993	23 April 1996
31	M. Orhan Taşanlar	23 April 1996	30 September 1999
32	Ali Fuat Güven	4 October 1999	2003
33	Oğuz Kağan Köksal	2003	2005
34	Nihat Canpolat	2005	2007
35	Şahabettin Harput	2007	2013
36	Münir Karaloğlu	2013	2016
37	İzzettin Küçük	2016	2018
38	Yakup Canbolat	2018	2023
39	Mahmut Demirtaş	2023	2024
40	Erol Ayyıldız	2024	-

== See also ==
- Governor (Turkey)
- Bursa Province
- Ministry of the Interior (Turkey)
