= Tuncay Güney =

Turkish spy

Sabah's front page for 26 November 2008.

Tuncay Güney (pronounced [ˈtundʒaj ˈɟynej]; born 25 August 1972 in Kargı), code name "Ipek" (silk), is a Turkish citizen of Dönmeh Jewish origin who claims to have infiltrated the Turkish Gendarmerie's intelligence organization JITEM, Ergenekon, the Workers' Party, and the Gülen movement before being outed. He is subordinate to Mehmet Eymür, who was discharged from the National Intelligence Organization (Turkish: Millî İstihbarat Teşkilâtı, MİT). The information Güney has gleaned on these organizations make him a key figure in the ongoing Ergenekon investigation. His statements form the backbone of the 2455-page Ergenekon indictment, which mentions him 492 times and labels him a suspect at large (Turkish: firari şüpheli).

== Background and personal life ==
Güney was born in the village of Gölet, Kargı, to Ali and Ayşe Güney; the youngest of three siblings. Güney says his family, whose roots can be traced to Egypt, was outcast by his community for being Sabbatean Jews. Less than a year after his birth, they left for the Harmantepe neighborhood of Gültepe, İstanbul.

In his spare time, his mother teaches the Quran to her neighbors' children in Gültepe. Güney says it was normal for Dönmeh crypto-Jews to express their devoutness to Islam, such as by sending their children to seminaries, in order to be accepted. His mother says "If my son said we are Jewish, we are Jewish."

His father was nominally a technician for the Beşiktaş School of Applied Fine Arts. According to Güney, this job was a cover for his work as a spy for the MİT, which used the school as training ground. Güney names Mehmet Eymür, the director of its defunct Counter-Terrorism Department, as one of his father's associates. His father started receiving his pension on 7 March 1982, and died on 13 February 1986. His father's funeral was attended by many men in uniforms. One of them was Eymür, who told his mother that they could contact MİT for support. Eymür later denied Güney's allegations that his father worked for the MİT.

When Güney was twelve, a friend of his family called Mithat Ulusoy took Güney to a boarding Islamic seminary (Turkish: yatılı Kuran kursu) of the Süleymancı sect, in Ayazağa. Güney says that the founders of the seminary are also Sabbateans. The manager of the Ayazağa student dormitory, Halil Atam, remembers Güney as a hard-working and peaceful student. Around the same time, while attending secondary school (Turkish: orta ikinci sınıf), Güney met the Welfare Party's mayor of Kağıthane, Arif Calban. Calban remembers Güney as a "good, bright kid". He allegedly dropped out of Pertevniyal high school after the first year (1986), however the headmaster, Aziz Yeniyol, has no record of Güney. Güney counters that he spent more time attending Tarabya Kemal Atatürk high school of Bedrettin Dalan's İstek Foundation.

Males in Turkey are mandated to do conscripted military service for the Turkish Armed Forces. Güney went to the army in Ardahan on 5 May 1997, but was discharged four months later after receiving an exemption for allegedly being homosexual. Güney said he was bored of the army, so he used his connections to get an exemption report from a psychiatrist at Ankara GATA. However, he denies that the report said he was homosexual. Rather, he says he helped many homosexuals obtain exemptions.

Güney currently lives in Toronto, Canada.

=== Marriages ===
On 28 September 1993 he married Nuray Güney, whom he had met through a mutual acquaintance in Germany. The couple divorced on 9 December 1994, after his wife complained that he continually asked for money.

After returning from the military in 1998, Güney married Rabia Taşdemir; the sister of his brother-in-law Adem (through his sister, Keziban). This marriage lasted for two years.

== Journalism career ==
Güney's employment records start on 1 May 1988. He has assumed a variety of jobs, mostly in journalism, to cover his actual profession of espionage. At the time he was exfiltrated to the United States, he was receiving a government pension. Since he is too young (29) to have retired, this has been adduced as proof of covert payment from the government. His file from the Social Security Administration (Turkish: Emekli Sandığı) was classified during the investigation.

He entered journalism through his maths teacher at Pertevniyal High School, who sent him to Tevfik Yener of Sabah, where he allegedly became an office boy. Three years later he transferred to Milliyet, along with Yener. Newsweek says it was the deputy headmaster, Ali Kuru, who introduced Güney to Yener. Yener confirms that Kuru asked him to hire Güney, since his father had died. Güney disputes the office boy position, claiming that he had the highest salary in the newspaper. Social Security Institution (Turkish: Sosyal Güvenlik Kurumu) records show that he received a monthly salary of approximately 65,500 lira in 1988 when he started; twice the minimum wage. By 1991, he was earning 1.1 million lira; five times the minimum wage (which had drastically increased due to inflation).

In 1991, he joined a new, conversative television channel called Samanyolu TV, of which he was a founding member. In April 1994 he became the anchorman. It was while preparing a show called Gündemdekiler that he met Veli Küçük. With his support, Güney found employment at the newspapers Tercüman and Akşam, and at the television channel HBB. After being discharged from the army for homosexuality, he worked in the military magazine Yeni Strateji, launched in January 1998. Yeni Strateji is owned by Turgut Büyükdağ, and edited by Ümit Oğuztan, an Ergenekon detainee.

He was paid case-by-case by Akşam from 1994 to 1996 to serve as a conduit of information from Veli Küçük. His boss, Behiç Kılıç, related an incident in which Güney brought the U.S. ambassador, Robert Pearson, to the office after the publication of an article about the U.S. arming of Iraqi Kurds. Kılıç said that Güney appeared to have a close relationship with Pearson, despite not knowing "a word of English".

During the Susurluk scandal, Güney submitted photos of Abdullah Çatlı dancing with İbrahim Şahin to Kanal D. Ergenekon defendant Ümit Oğuztan alleged that Güney testified before the Susurluk commission, and that he knew Tansu Çiller, Mehmet Ağar, and Necmettin Erbakan.

Before fleeing Turkey, Güney worked for six months at Samanyolu, where he presented a political show called Doruktakiler.

== Spy career ==
He was inducted in 1990 (aged 18) by Galip Tuğcu, the head of the Istanbul station. Initially operating in the Reactionary Activities Department (Turkish: Gerici Faaliyetler Şubesi) (i.e., countering religious fundamentalism), Güney was transferred to the Iran station in 1992. His assignment was to infiltrate JITEM and Ergenekon. He met Veli Küçük during this assignment, who provided him (and thus MİT) with much information about the Susurluk scandal, which Küçük was implicated in.

=== Fraud charges (2001) ===
When Güney's journalism career tanked due to his lack of education, he sought other avenues of income. He set up a car registration racket with a financial budget non-commissioned officer (Turkish: maliye astsubayı) he had met in Kars, called Murat Oğuz. Güney's brother-in-law and chauffeur, Adem Taşdemir, joined the racket. According to his testimony to the Istanbul First Heavy Penal Court, file number 2002/64, the racket extended to appropriating real estate.

Güney was apprehended on 2 March 2001 after an individual named Timur Büyükölmez filed a complaint to the Fatih Republic Prosecutor's Office on 8 February 2001 stating that he had been cheated by police officers Orhan Sonuç—a.k.a. Tuncay Güney—and Erdal Güventürk—a.k.a. Adem Taşdemir—over the purchase of an SUV. The vehicle was originally a gift from a retired police officer named Ümit Bavbek to Veli Küçük in return for his and Güney's support in "settling" a debt with Semih Tufan Gülaltay, the convicted killer of human rights activist Akın Birdal. When Küçük rejected the car, Güney took it and eventually put it up for sale on a newspaper. Güney took deposits from two people, who reported him to the police upon learning that they had been cheated. In a December 2008 testimony, Küçük said Güney gave him the car because Güney knew that he was about to retire, and had no car of his own. Küçük confirmed that he rejected the car, and said that the Ergenekon investigation would probably have begun much earlier had he accepted it. In the next hearing, Küçük testified that his acquaintanceship with Güney was superficial, and that he had not seen Güney since 2000.

He was questioned by the İstanbul Gayrettepe Public Order Department (Turkish: Emniyet Müdürlüğü Asayiş Şube Müdürlüğü) on 1 March 2001. A few days later, without conducting any searches, he was transferred to the Anti-Smuggling and Organized Crime Department (Turkish: Organize Suçlarla Mücadele ve Kaçakçılık Şube Müdürlüğü) led by Adil Serdar Saçan. A search of Güney's home four days later by the latter group turned up two guns, fake license plates, 115 fake diplomas, numerous identity cards (Turkish: nüfus cüzdanı) of people he had allegedly had sex with—and the six sacks of evidence on which the Ergenekon indictment is based. After his questioning, he was arrested on 8 March 2001 and taken to Bayrampaşa prison. According to his lawyer, Güney was released the next day on 3000 Lira bail, paid by Güney's sister with the proceeds of the sale of a building in Tarlabaşı, Taksim owned by Güney. His friend and Ergenekon suspect, Ümit Oğuztan, testified that he had stayed briefly at the Taksim apartment; a three-floor property Güney had allegedly bought from Matild Manukyan on 29 May 2000.

Güney was exfiltrated to the United States one day after being released on bail, despite an injunction from travelling, on a ten-year visa he had obtained on 4 February 1999. The newspaper Yeni Şafak says that his departure was encouraged by both Saçan, and Küçük.

In November 2008 it was revealed that Saçan had discovered Güney's identity as a spy during the interrogation, and that upon learning this, Küçük negotiated his release in order to prevent the police from learning that Güney worked for JİTEM. At this point, the undersecretary of the MİT, Şenkal Atasagun, stepped in and asked the CIA to exfiltrate him to the United States. MİT's Istanbul station chief, Kubilay Günay, and his team had Güney flown by Turkish Airlines to Manhattan, New York City, where he was put up in the Marmara Manhattan on 301 East 94 Street. One week later he moved to a flat owned by the MİT next to the Manhattan post office.

Güney was indicted on 16 May for falsifying vehicle registration documents. By that time he had been exfiltrated, with the help of Adnan Akfırat of Perinçek's Aydınlık magazine. (Retired MİT official Mehmet Eymür said that Güney had infiltrated Perinçek's organization.)

In 2004 he obtained political asylum and moved to Toronto, Canada, supposedly with the help of the owner of the hotel he was staying in Manhattan, a Mehmet Özbay from Urfa. Güney holds that Özbay gave his identity card to Abdullah Çatlı, a hitman who died in the Susurluk crash. However, a governmental commission set up to investigate the accident concluded that "Mehmet Özbay" was an alias. The actual owners of the hotel, the Marmara Manhattan, are the Gürsel family.

Güney alleges that he entered Canada on 14 February 2004, and that his application took 1.5 years to process. His legal counsel is from Legal Aid Ontario. Güney initially sought asylum for sexual discrimination, stating that his circumstances were "exceptional"; however, the Immigration and Refugee Board of Canada concluded that he was an ordinary applicant. Numerous observers have said that Güney played the religious persecution and sexual persecution cards in order to bolster his asylum application.

=== Appearances on 32. Gün ===
Before his outing, Güney participated in three teleconference debates on Kanal Ds 32. Gün, where participants questioned how, as a journalist unknown in the Turkish press community, he came into possession of six sacks full of evidence. (In the indictment, he is recorded as having obtained them from a disgruntled army officer.) Later in the show, Güney pointedly threatened Perinçek with retaliation if he continued to print allegations about him in his magazine Aydınlık. When asked about allegations of his being a CIA agent, Güney said that he did not work for the CIA, but added that it was an ordinary organization anybody was free to work for. In the second show, when pressed, Güney said he was protecting Küçük. (During the course of the Ergenekon investigation, it emerged that the MİT had requested support from the CIA to procure Güney a visa.)

During the 28 November episode, Güney was asked about his religious identity and Jacob's House Synagogue, his MİT affiliation, his trips to Iran, and his pension benefits. Güney said that journalists had been unable to verify his status in Canada because he came from an obscure Jewish congregation. Concerning the orphanhood benefits resulting from his father's death in 1986, he vacillated over whether he had been paid until age 18 (adulthood), or 20. According to the chairman of the Social Security Ministry (Turkish: Çalışma ve Sosyal Güvenlik Bakanı), Faruk Çelik, Güney was compensated from 1 March 1986 to 1 October 1992, when he completed his secondary education. According to his mother, he was paid until age 18.

=== Outing (2008) ===
Güney's identity was not revealed until the chief prosecutor of the Ergenekon investigation, Zekeriya Öz, requested his file from the MİT during the sixteenth hearing, in November 2008. MİT responded on 9 May 2008 with document number 11.010.05.051/14-16015736. Öz had noticed that Güney was referred to as Tuncay Güney İPEK in a confidential MİT report seized from Güney during the course of the investigation. The report, numbered 10.251.01.011(IST00736) and dated 7 February 1997, indicates his station and alias. The report writes that police chief Hanefi Avcı's testimony to the Susurluk commission left Güney's undercover superior in JITEM, Veli Küçük, in a bind, and that this was a liability for Güney himself.

You mentioned Tuncay Güney…
He's one of us; he says so…
That is, an intelligence agent…
He's pretty good, too…
He infiltrated your organization…
Aired your dirty linens…
You really took the bait…
My condolences…
The rest is history.

— Extract from Eymür's open letter.

However, Güney's alias had already been mentioned in the press (albeit without an explanation of its meaning), and his boss Mehmet Eymür outed him two weeks before the court announcement, in an open letter to the deputy chief of the Workers' Party (the party chief himself being accused of being an Ergenekon ringleader). Eymür had alluded to Güney's identity as far back as 2000, referring to him as "Tunca" in an article deriding Güney for profiting from the sale of photographs to the press of people involved in the Susurluk scandal. His boss at the newspaper Akşam, Behiç Kılıç, said Güney stole pictures from the archives which were used to create a widely circulated composite of prime minister Mesut Yılmaz and notorious criminal Abdullah Çatlı.

In response to the Sabah article purportedly revealing his identity (see below for a dissenting view), the MİT immediately issued a press release, albeit an ambiguous one. It stated that Güney was not an employee; a "registered informant" (Turkish: kayıtlı kaynak). Rather, he was a person they found suspicious. It insinuated that he was subordinate to Eymür, whose Counter-Terrorism Department was disbanded in 1997. Sabah posted a follow-up article, asking Güney directly if he worked for the MİT. Güney said it was too early to speak out, and that doing so would violate MİT's bylaws. Reading between the lines of the MİT press release, intelligence expert Mahir Kaynak and Radikal's Ismet Berkan said that Güney should be associated with Eymür, not the MİT.

Finally, Eymür contradicted the statements on his Web site by saying that he did not know Güney. One day later, Güney likewise denied knowing Eymür. Indeed, he denied ever having worked for any intelligence agency. Ergenekon defendant Ümit Oğuztan testified that he had witnessed Eymür call Güney by telephone after learning that Güney had befriended an Iranian diplomat called Muhsin Karger Azad.

Owing to confusion over Güney's status, the MİT report was leaked once again, to a different newspaper, this time in full. The editor-in-chief of the newspaper Radikal took it to mean that the Sabah article was disinformation, and that Güney was not from the MİT, but followed by it.

== Subjects of espionage ==
=== JITEM/Ergenekon ===
In 1992 the MIT tasked Güney with infiltrating Ergenekon and the Gendarmerie's counter-terrorism and intelligence wing, JITEM, and reporting to the MIT bureau in Dolmabahçe Palace's harem. Güney says he met retired colonel Necabettin Ergenekon, who some say is the eponymous person behind the organization, that year through a student at the Military Academy, and that Ergenekon introduced him to Veli Küçük; the founder of JITEM and a member of Ergenekon. Necabettin Ergenekon says he retired in 1982 and does not know Güney. In his Ergenekon testimony, Küçük says he met Güney through an elder, retired soldier, implicitly confirming Güney's assertion. In another article, Güney says he met Küçük as a journalist for Samanyolu TV.

He approached Küçük as a journalist, who sent him as a member of JITEM to spy on Massoud Barzani, Jalal Talabani and the leader of Hezbullah, Hüseyin Velioğlu. Küçük did not know that Güney was a double agent for the MİT.

==== Police testimony ====
Güney said his statements, which were instrumental in implicating Küçük, were extracted over nine days of torture (including genital electrocution) and therefore unreliable. However, a more recent article in the same newspaper says that Güney was an expert at dealing with questioning, and had established a good enough rapport to request special treatment. The superior of his two interrogators, Adil Serdar Saçan of the Organized Crime Department, also refutes the torture allegations.

According to police chief Hakan Ünsal Yalçın, Güney openly said he was protected by Küçük and that Ergenekon would get him out. One of his interrogators, Ahmet İhtiyaroğlu, said that Güney was unique among the 24,000 people he had questioned: "It was as if he was sent to tell us something. It is not usual for someone to possess so many documents and talk so freely." The interrogators asked him what Ergenekon was, and Güney proceed to explain. İhtiyaroğlu was amazed by what he had heard and had Güney repeat the story in front of some other associates, paying close attention to Güney's behavior. Contrary to his expectations, İhtiyaroğlu said Güney was very relaxed, except when questioned about the Gülen movement. Güney told İhtiyaroğlu that the Gülen movement is a unit of Ergenekon. İhtiyaroğlu reported his findings to the Istanbul attorney general on 28 October 2008. Once the interrogation tapes were transcribed, a petition was written to request the continuation of the investigation by the Organized Technical Bureau (Turkish: Organize Teknik Bürosu) based on the contents of the tape. This request was submitted to State Security Court (DGM) chief prosecutor Aykut Cengiz Engin (who announced the Ergenekon case). A furious Engin told İhtiyaroğlu that it was out of his jurisdiction, and rejected the request. Later, he changed his mind and had DGM prosecutor Muzaffer Yalçın do some preliminary work. Yalçın decided to reassign the case from Saçan's Organized Crimes Department to the Intelligence Department, then led by Halil Çatıkkaş by his deputy Niyazi Palabıyık. The Intelligence Department closed the case one year later, citing a lack of evidence to substantiate the claims. Saçan stresses that Çatıkkaş and Palabıyık had nothing to do with it and hints at Veli Küçük and a gang loyal to Fethullah Gülen inside that department. Istanbul governor Erol Çakır, who later formed a security company with Veli Küçük, was aware of the investigation and may have led to its closure at Küçük's behest.

In January 2004, the Ergenekon documents seized from Güney were found in a depot belonging Saçan located in Gazi Osman Paşa, Istanbul. (They are included in the indictment and its annex.) Saçan says he never saw Güney in person. His coworker says that Saçan had a habit of making copies of important pieces of evidence for safe keeping.

Saçan was probed in September 2008 for covering up the Ergenekon investigation, allegedly because documents seized from Veli Küçük contained unfavorable material about Saçan. Furthermore, Güney alleges that Saçan had portions of his interrogation tape scrubbed. What the missing portions of the tape contained is a matter of much speculation.

Saçan's statements in defense of Ergenekon detainee Oktay Yıldırım (the person whose grenades in Ümraniye officially launched the investigation) have gone on record. Since 2002, Saçan was fired six times and sued 39 times (acquitted on 36, as of August 2008). He was detained on 23 September 2008 on charges of being an Ergenekon member. Just before 2009, he was sentenced to five months in prison on charges of concealing the Ergenekon files.

Ergenekon defendant Doğu Perinçek said that the content of Güney's testimony in 2001 was irrelevant to his crime (racketeering) and that the whole affair was a ruse by the CIA to entrap himself, his party, and Turkey.

Güney's testimony is partially included in folders 165 and 442 of the annex. The more complete version in the latter runs 128 pages and also includes a separate 16 page summary. However, Adnan Akfırat of the Workers' Party alleges that even this version is abridged (i.e., from the scrubbed tape) and that the actual transcript is 170 pages.

The court has obtained a copy of the interrogation tapes; four of Güney, and one of Ümit Oğuztan. The book “Black Box: Ergenekon's Unknown Name, Tuncay Güney”, contains shocking statements from the mysterious witness. Nuh Gönültaş at Bugün wrote about some interesting information from supreme Ergenekon weirdo, Tuncay Güney, in a piece titled "Where are JITEM's acid death wells?" that uses Faruk Arslan's book, “The Black Box, Tuncay Güney”, as a resource. Güney, who first disclosed Ergenekon and has become a legend, has an important nine-year relationship with Veli Küçük, who was the deep paşa of the 1990s.Güney claims that thousands of Kurdish citizens, who were killed by JITEM as extrajudicial victims for harboring PKK's secrets, were thrown into acid-filled wells, in which their corpses dissolved. Thus their bodies were never found. This was quite original and new information. Güney advises looking at the BOTAŞ complex which JITEM had used in the Southeast in the 1990s, to find acid-filled death wells. For years, no one knew where the graves of more than 18,000 citizens were, and most of the victims were of Kurdish origin and were killed by "unknown perpetrators"; no one had questioned or dared to question the case before. Güney claims that there are very few people who know where these acid-filled wells are located in the Southeast, and although Veli Küçük is one of them, he does not reveal this information. However, Güney gives a specific address in the book: "The places where JITEM and Küçük's group used were these places. For a clear address, when you go towards the Habur border, close by Mardin's old town Cizre, on the left there is a complex that is guarded by soldiers. If you dig there, there will be a lot of bodies. BOTAŞ has enterprises in Diyarbakır, Batman, Adıyaman and these places should also be checked." As a response to the question as to where they would find the acid, Güney replied in a classic way: "There are several factories in İzmit. Even Küçük's greeting is an order for them. Besides, for drug-trafficking they needed acid. They had become experts in bringing acid." For more on this issue, see 32. Gün from November 2008, in which Güney reiterates the claim about the acid-filled wells. Note that I've provided the link for the first in a series of fourteen videos of that particular edition of 32. Gün. Now it looks like the Şırnak state prosecutor is going to investigate the claims of the acid-filled wells. The complaint was initially made by the head of the Şırnak Bar Association, based on the book by Faruk Arslan, mentioned in the Nuh Gönultaş piece. Before the state prosecutor's decision to go ahead with the investigation of the acid-filled wells, the Şırnak Bar Association vowed to move to open the wells at first opportunity as soon as their exact locations were identified. The bar association will now be able to do just that, using Arslan's book. In an article from Zaman, Şırnak Bar Association chief Nuşirevan Elçi says: "This situation gave us hope. Turkey must face its past in order to have a bright future. If there are illegal implementations, these must come before the judiciary. The relatives of those murdered by unknown perpetrators don't know whether or not they are dead these last 15–20 years. This situation puts those people in pain. If this event is disclosed, these people will cease hoping. For Turkey's bright future, these kinds of works must be done. Especially within this context I see the Ergenekon investigation as a new era." In the past, the DTP (a Kurdish party in Turkey) had said that unless Ergenekon was investigated east of the Euphrates, there would be little hope for a solution to the Kurdish question in Turkey. Now let's wait and see how much of this is truly investigated and what the results will reveal. Then we'll find out, too, whether Ergenekon's mysterious "black box" has any credibility.

=== Gülen movement ===
Güney has been in contact with Fethullah Gülen, an Islamic preacher. At one point, Güney submitted a weekly espionage report on the sect to Yavuz Ataç, who then passed it on to Eymür.

Güney arranged his first meetings with Gülen in 1989–1991 at the Fem cram school (Turkish: dershane) in Altunizade, Istanbul.

After leaving his post at Milliyet, Güney spent his weekends talking to the manager of the Boğaziçi Kırklar boys' dormitory in Gültepe, which he says is affiliated with the sect. The current manager of the dormitory, Ömer Şamil Yalçın, says that Güney was not a registered student.

Through the Cağaloğlu manager of the newspaper Zaman's classifieds section, he found employment at Işık Prodüksiyon on 1 March 1994, a production company that works with Samanyolu TV. Zaman and Samanyolu are claimed to be Gülen's flagship media organizations. Güney also allegedly stole the much-publicized videotaped speeches of Gülen in which he advised his devotees to take official positions in Turkish state. Güney was fired on 31 October 1994, and Gülen subsequently emigrated to the United States, where he remains to this day.

Journalist Ayşe Önal of Nokta, who was introduced to Gülen by him while he was producing Doruktakiler, said she was surprised by how well-connected Güney seemed despite his being only 22 at the time.

Güney alleges that the former chief of Samanyolu TV, Mehmet Demircan, tried to get Veli Küçük to join the Gulen movement, and that Küçük and Gülen know each other from the National Struggle Unity Committee (Turkish: Milli Mücadele Birlik Komitesi). This organization descends from the Association for Struggling with Communism (Turkish: Komünizmle Mücadele Derneği), which was set up by the Counter-Guerrilla as a civilian front. Demircan was fired after he allegedly planned to oust Gülen.

=== Muhsin Karger Azad ===
Güney met an Iranian diplomat called Muhsin Karger Azad in a gay bar, thinking that espionage agents would not look for him there. Azad was officially the Iran Consulate's political affairs undersecretary, but allegedly also a member the Iranian branch of Operation Gladio, MOD. After the MİT learned that the two had made contact, Eymür instructed Güney to report back his findings.

Azad is suspected of being involved in the assassination of Kemalist intellectual Uğur Mumcu. For this, he was expelled to Tehran in 1995. Despite the chronology, Ergenekon suspect Ümit Oğuztan testified that he witnessed Güney collect intelligence on Azad while he (Oğuztan) and Güney were working at Turgut Büyükdağ's Strateji magazine in 1997.

== United States and Canada (1999–present) ==
Güney is alleged to have a string of aliases: Tuncay Güney, Tuncay İpek, Tuncay Güney İpek, Tuncay Bubey, Tolga İpek, Daniel Güney, Daniel Levi, Kemal Kosbağ, Alparslan Evrenos, and Alpaslan Evrenos. An individual named Alpaslan Evrenosoğlu was also alleged to be an alias for Güney, but the police said such a person actually existed.

=== New York Institute ===
While working for Milliyet, Güney expressed his interest in converting to Christianity and learning English in the United States to a Protestant priest in Turkey. He took six months of English lessons from the church.

He obtained a ten-year visa on 4 February 1999, enabling him to travel to the United States, which he did in June 2001 to avoid being tried for fraud in Istanbul. (He remains convicted in absentia.) His visa is stamped "R B1/B2" (R=Regular, B1=Business, B2=Visitor), which means he is not eligible to work in the United States. In response to a question from the Immigration and Refugee Board of Canada, the Turkish consul said that ten-year "R B1/B2" visas are normally issued "to people providing solid guarantee of returning to Turkey". Erkan Önsel of the Workers' Party (whose chairman is one of the main defendants in the Ergenekon case) alleged that Güney was issued a ten-year visa in order to set the Ergenekon investigation in motion and save himself by traveling abroad.

In New York, Güney found an Evangelical priest called Howard Williams, possibly through his Protestant connections in Turkey, according to Newsweek. Williams forwarded Güney to an evangelical Turk from Dargeçit, Mardin by the name of Yakup Can, for support. Can says he taught Güney the Old Testament every Thursday—his day off work from the gas station—from noon to eight at night. Finally, Güney converted to Christianity in 2004. In a later Hürriyet article, Güney says he never worked in New York.

His nominal employer in the United States was the "New York Institute", with post office box addresses in New Jersey and Toronto, Canada; his next destination. According to Can, Güney set up the organization as a front for his journalism and "research activities". Can assented to lending his name as manager of the organization, though he says he did not take part in any of its activities.

When Güney told Can he had concerns over his safety and immigration status, Can allegedly drove Güney to the Canada–US border.

=== Life School of English ===
One of Güney's employers in Canada was the Life School of English (LSE), chaired by Tim Stevens of the New York Institute. The LSE is an evangelical language school for refugees, mainly from Iran, Iraq, and Turkey, subsidized by a state fund for refugees. The school formerly operated from the Calvary Church in Toronto, and moved out in order to avoid its $400 monthly fee. Güney said Tim Stevens helped sort out his immigration problems, but the information Stevens gave about Güney's residence turned out to be inaccurate, says Hürriyet.

=== Jacob's House ===
Güney claims that he is from a Jewish family that descends from Egypt, and that they practiced their faith in secret (crypto-Judaism). He also claims to be a rabbi "Daniel Levi" at the Jacob's House ("B'nai Yakov" in Hebrew) Jewish Community Center. However, journalists investigated his background and raised several concerns:

- It is impossible for Güney to have completed his rabbinical training since his 2004 arrival in Canada, according to the Turkish Jewish Congregation (Turkish: Türk Musevi Cemaati).
- The Toronto Board of Rabbis has no record of a rabbi by his name. A leading rabbi of the Orthodox community, Moshe Stern, did not recognize his name, and also voiced concerns regarding Güney's rabbinical education.
- Jacob's House, despite listing his name on its Web site, has no records of a rabbi by his name. A personnel query revealed that the head rabbi was someone else.
- The person who answers the listed phone number says it is a language school (the congregation's address is the same as the "New York Institute", mentioned below).
- The communications director of the United Jewish Appeal in Toronto, Howard English, did not recognize him or his synagogue. The education director of the Toronto branch of Jews for Judaism, rabbi Michael Skobac, did not recognize him, and could not reach them by e-mail.
- Newsweek reports that Güney himself accepts that Jacob's House is not a synagogue, although their Web site says otherwise. It is not registered with the Jewish Foundation of Greater Toronto. Güney counters that his congregation is autonomous, and that journalists have been asking Jewish leaders from communities who have no authority to comment on his own congregation.

Finally, Canadian immigration officials do not question the religious qualifications of visa applicants. Based on these grounds, Milliyet and Newsweek say that Jacob's House is a front organization to enable Güney to reside in Canada.

The congregation's listed address is a post office box (P.O. Box 63085, Toronto), deceptively prefixed "1655 Dufferin Street" (an actual location in Toronto Central), apparently matching the Canadian address of his front organization in the United States, the "New York Institute". This property on 1655 Dufferin Street is a small "medical clinic" building, "immediately available" from PAR-Med Property Services Inc. The U.S. address of the NYI is also a post office box.

==== Daniel Levi ====
The name Güney goes by in Canada is the same as the person who was convicted in absentia with Canadian citizen Mohammed el-Attar (now jailed in Egypt) for being spies for Israel. Like Güney, el-Attar said he was a homosexual, religious convert, and that he confessed only after days of torture. el-Attar said that Levi recommended he identify himself as a homosexual and change his religion before applying for asylum in Canada. The other two convicts at large, who have Turkish first names and have not been sighted, are Kemal Kosba and Tuncay Bubay. According to a senior official at Egypt's Ministry of Foreign Affairs, Kosba, Bubay, and Levi are all aliases for Tuncay Güney. Egyptian sources allege that the convicts were MOSSAD agents trying to recruit Egyptians into MOSSAD.
