= Weapons found in the Ergenekon investigation =

A number of Weapons found in the Ergenekon investigation form a key part of the Ergenekon trials, prosecuting the Ergenekon organization. The Ergenekon investigation officially began after an anonymous tip led to the finding of 27 grenades in Ümraniye, a district of Istanbul. The serial numbers of these grenades matched those of grenades found in other locations and some used in terrorist attacks.

== Overview ==
Debate about weapons evidence in the Ergenekon investigation has focused in particular on the grenades, which can be uniquely identified by the fuse type (Turkish: fünye grubu) and batch number (Turkish: kafile numarası). According to police officials, "HGR DM 41" indicates German origin, SPLITTER denotes a fragmentation grenade, "COMP-B" means composition B, "LOS" indicates European production up to NATO standards, while the number following "FMP" indicates the batch. The NATO standard, Makine ve Kimya Endüstrisi Kurumu (MKE) grenades have serial numbers like TAPA M 204 A 2/KF-MKE-91 12–77. The part before the slash denotes the fuse type, while the part after it denotes the batch number. For example, the batch number of the first entry means 'batch 91, December 1977'. The army bought 8800 such grenades from the MKE in 1978.

Date	Description	Serial numbers
4 December 1998	Two hand grenades were found in a house in Manisa province, Akhisar district.	One had the serial number HGR DM 41 SPLITTER COMP-B LOS FMP 24.
26 February 1999	In İzmir province Urla district 10 hand grenades were found.	One of the ten grenades had the serial number HGR DM 41 SPLITTER COMP-B LOS FMP 16.
25 March 1999	In connection with an operation against the militant Islamic organization Hezbollah in Şırnak 41 people were arrested and of six hand grenades one was linked to the Ergenekon investigation.	
26 May 1999	A hand grenade was thrown into the office of Nicu Portase in Trabzon Province Of district.	
30 December 2000	In İzmir province, Karşıyaka district a defence hand grenade was found.	
29 July 2001	In Antalya Province Alanya district three hand grenades were found in a hotel.	
11 August 2001	In the centre of Hatay, İzmir a hand grenade was thrown at the car of Hayrettin Yavuz.	
29 July 2002	A hand grenade was found in a dustbin in Kütahya.	
27 February 2003	A hand grenade was found near the Eyüp Lyceum in İstanbul province Eyüp district.	HGR DM 41 COMP-B LOS FMR-24.
18 May 2003	In the garden of Kerem Adıgüzel in Amasya Province Merzifon district a hand grenade of MKE exploded.	
25 November 2003	Hand grenades were found in the fields in Ağrı Province Patnos district that had not exploded although the pins had been pulled.	
9 May 2005	Two hand grenades were found on Serkan Şahin and Abdurrahman Dağ in Kırıkkale Province Keskin district.	
5–11 May 2006	A hand grenade thrown at the newspaper Cumhuriyet in İstanbul Şişli.	* TAPA M 204 A 2/KF-MKE-91 12–77 (5 May 2006): TAPA M 204 A 2/KF-MKE-173 9–85 (10 May 2006); TAPA M 204 A 2/KF-MKE-91 12–77 (11 May 2006)
9 November 2005	Şemdinli incident	Two grenades with serial number HGR DM 41 SPLITTER COMP-B LOS FMP 134.
2 October 2006	In Konak, Izmir one of two hand grenades thrown into a coffee shop in Alsancak, killing İbrahim Çiftçi and injuring two persons reportedly relates to the Ergenekon investigation.	
30 November 2006	In İstanbul Tuzla district a hand grenade of MKE brand was found.	
11 December 2006	In the hotel "Iğdır Doğu" one MKE brand hand grenade was found.	
12 June 2007	Ümraniye	HGR DM 41 SPLITTER COMP-B LOS FMP 16; HGR DM 41 SPLITTER COMP-B LOS FMP 24; HGR DM 41 SPLITTER COMP-B LOS FMP 22; TAPA M 204 A2/KF-MKE-169 5–85
26 June 2007	Fikret Emek	TAPA M204 A2/KF-MKE-91 12–77, matching the ones from the Cumhuriyet attack.
13 December 2008	Trabzon	HGR DM 41 SPLITTER COMP-B LOS FMP 143; HGR DM 41 SPLITTER COMP-B LOS FMP 197; HGR DM 41 SPLITTER COMP-B LOS FMP 125
2009	Çatalarmut, Erzincan	Some of the grenades found at Çatalarmut Dam numbered HGR DM41 SPLITTER COMP-B LOS FMP-134.; The grenade found in Çatalarmut numbered MKE MOD45 MKE-1-18 08-89 and the one thrown at Akkoyunlu Police Station in Istanbul Ümraniye on 22 November 2000 belonged to the same tag group. The same could be said for one of three hand grenades that on 30 January 2006 killed the police officer Cenk İce working in a clinic in Eşrefpaşa (Izmir).; The grenade found in Çatalarmut numbered HGR DM41 SPLITTER COMP-B LOS FMP-19 belonged to the same group as the hand grenade found on 20 March 2000 in the house of the PKK militant Seyfettin Işık in Mardin Province Midyat district.; Five hand grenades found on 20 May 2004 during the search of a house belonging to the PKK in Adana Province İncirlik district had the same table number as the ones found in Çatalarmut (HGR Z DM72 LOS FMP-19).

== Grenades in Ümraniye (2007) ==
The investigation officially began after the Trabzon Gendarmerie Headquarters' tip-off line received an anonymous call on 12 June 2007 saying that grenades and C-4 explosives were to be found at Güngör Sokak No. 2, Çakmak Mahallesi, Ümraniye (41°1′13.69″N 29°7′10.21″E). A search warrant was immediately obtained from the Ümraniye 2. Peace Penal Court. 27 hand grenades (but no C-4) were found in a nylon-covered wooden chest on the roof of a slum at the stated address.

The serial numbers of some of the 27 grenades found in Ümraniye are:

- HGR DM 41 SPLITTER COMP-B LOS FMP 16
- HGR DM 41 SPLITTER COMP-B LOS FMP 24
- HGR DM 41 SPLITTER COMP-B LOS FMP 22
- TAPA M 204 A2/KF-MKE-169 5–85

These grenades are registered to the Hasdal barracks in Istanbul.

The grenades were found to bear the same serial number as those used in 14 incidents throughout the country. They were disposed of two weeks after their discovery on account of their not being preservable.

A search of Yıldırım's office in Reina and Muzaffer Tekin's house revealed a secret document titled "Ergenekon Lobi" about the group's plans. The information in the documents led the authorities to revisit the Tuncay Güney case.

=== Indictments ===
According to the indictment, the caller was Şevki Yiğit, the father of the building's tenant, Ali Yiğit. Şevki found the bomb-filled chest by accident and asked his son about them. Ali then asked the owner of the house, his uncle Mehmet Demirtaş about it. According to Yiğit, Demirtaş responded that there was a chest with military equipment on the roof belonging to Special Warfare Department (ÖHD) NCO Oktay Yıldırım, and instructed him to keep quiet about it. Ali Yiğit added that retired captain Muzaffer Tekin and retired NCO Mahmut Öztürk, both of them special forces, once stopped by his grocery store (adjacent to the slum, and owned by Demirtaş) in a black Mercedes while Yıldırım was present, that Yıldırım left only to return with Öztürk 15–20 minutes later in a yellow Opel Corsa, and that his father found the bombs 3–4 months later. Yiğit said that his father, who lives in Trabzon, might have placed the call since he was not on good terms with Demirtaş.

Yıldırım later denied the charges, though his fingerprints were found on the chest. During his trial, he referred to Demirtaş as a former subordinate soldier of his, and said that the four reports about his fingerprints contradicted one another. Yıldırım also alleged that Ali Yiğit failed to distinguish Tekin from Öztürk when brought to Bayrampaşa Prison. Cross-examining Yiğit, Yıldırım asked him if Demirtaş was present when the police searched for the grenades. Yiğit said "no", contradicting his earlier statement that Demirtaş had arrived after a phone call by the police. (Demirtaş said he was personally not present.)

At the thirteenth hearing, Ali Yiğit said that he mistook someone for Muzaffer Tekin, with whom he shared a cell in Bayrampaşa prison and bonded well enough to look up to as a father figure. He also stated that he had moved out of the building twenty days before they were found. After learning about the grenades, he left his job at the grocery, and became a taxi driver. He was allegedly driving by the house when the police came and told them that the place was his so that they would not break down the door. However, his uncle Demirtaş did not trust Yiğit and left the keys to Yiğit's brother, Murat. They fetched the keys, searched the house, had Yiğit confirm that the grenades had been found and that the house had not been harmed, then took him to the station to obtain his statement, described above. After being detained, Yiğit says he was intimidated by Demirtaş, Kerinçsiz, Yıldırım, and his lawyer. Yıldırım allegedly pressured Yiğit to incriminate his father (Şevki) by calling him a weapons smuggler.

Demirtaş strongly denied having made the explanation about the origin of the chest, as alleged by Yiğit. Demirtaş alleged that Yiğit confided to him that he had only seen pictures of Tekin at the police station. According to Radikal, the police threatened him with 39 years in jail if he did not blame Oktay Yıldırım.

== Others ==
=== Fikret Emek (2007) ===
On 26 June 2007 various material was recovered from the home of the mother of Fikret Emek. The recovered materiel included 11 kg of C-3, a telescopic rifle, a Kalashnikov, a shotgun, M-16 cartridges, 12 grenades (10 from the MKE), smoke bombs, 12 210g TNT setups, 6 500g TNT molds, a 1.5 kg TNT mold, a 1 kg demolition block, ignition munitions. This is sufficient to flatten a twelve-floor reinforced concrete structure, with each floor over 400 m^{2}. The grenades have serial number TAPA M204 A2/KF-MKE-91 12–77, matching the ones from the Cumhuriyet attack.

=== Trabzon (2008) ===
With the help of a tip-off on 3 December 2008, the Trabzon police on 13 December 2008 found nine grenades of the same batch number as those in Ümraniye. In nearby Yomra, the police seized a gun and eight 7.65 mm bullets for it, a Kalashnikov rifle and three chargers, a total of 420 7.62 mm Kalashnikov bullets and a grenade. In the city, eight grenades were found; seven hidden inside a washing machine, and another in an oven. Trabzon governor Nuri Okutan said that none of the suspects were public officials or members of the military. The serial numbers of the Trabzon grenades are:

- HGR DM 41 SPLITTER COMP-B LOS FMP 143
- HGR DM 41 SPLITTER COMP-B LOS FMP 197
- HGR DM 41 SPLITTER COMP-B LOS FMP 125

The grenades in Ümraniye had also been found following a tip-off in Trabzon. However, the former tip-off was to the gendarmerie rather than the police.

=== Dönmez and Şahin (2009) ===
Searches at the homes of Mustafa Dönmez and İbrahim Şahin on 7 January 2009 found a variety of materiel.

22 grenades, over 100 bullets, 1 Kalashnikov, and 4 pistols were found in Dönmez's vacation house in Sakarya.

Three drawings and 9 unlicensed Glock pistols were found in the home of special forces police chief İbrahim Şahin. The drawings led to a location in Ankara's Gölbaşı district where excavation revealed 8000 bullets (mostly Uzi), 2 light-weight anti-tank weapons, 1 kg of plastic explosives, 10 hand grenades whose serial numbers had been removed and 10 smoke bombs. The recovered weapons were determined to be buried in July 2008 (the month generals Eruygur and Tolon were detained). They are reported to be different from the ones that were entrusted to Şahin's department and went missing after Susurluk scandal.

=== Poyrazköy (2009) ===
During excavations in Poyrazköy in Beykoz district, Istanbul that lasted from 21 to 28 April 2009 arms including 21 LAW arms, 14 hand grenades and 450 grams explosives were found. The discovery resulted in a separate court case known as the Poyrazköy case. The arms were found on the land of Bedrettin Dalan's Istek Foundation.

=== Erzincan (2009) ===
Searches in Erzincan on 27 October 2009 found various materiel. On 19 November 2009 the General Directorate for Security informed the prosecutor's office in Erzurum that the munition found at the Çatalarmut Dam in Erzincan Province could be related to 30 incidents. The bombs found at Çatalarmut Dam numbered HGR DM41 SPLITTER COMP-B LOS FMP-134 were from the same series as one of the hand grenades numbered HGR DM41 SPLITTER COMP-B LOS FMP-134 used in the Şemdinli bombing. The bomb found in Çatalarmut numbered MKE MOD45 MKE-1-18 08-89 and the one thrown at Akkoyunlu Police Station in Istanbul Ümraniye on 22 November 2000 belonged to the same tag group. The same could be said for one of three hand grenades that on 30 January 2006 killed the police officer Cenk İce working in a clinic in Eşrefpaşa (Izmir). The bomb found in Çatalarmut numbered HGR DM41 SPLITTER COMP-B LOS FMP-19 belonged to the same group as the hand grenade found on 20 March 2000 in the house of the PKK militant Seyfettin Işık in Mardin Province Midyat district. Of the five hand grenades found on 20 May 2004 during the search of a house belonging to the PKK in Adana Province İncirlik district had the same table number as the ones found in Çatalarmut (HGR Z DM72 LOS FMP-19).
