= Mohammed el-Attar =

Convicted spy for Israel

Mohammed Essam Ghoneim el-Attar (born 1970 in Cairo, Egypt) is a Canadian-Egyptian man accused and convicted of spying for Israel.

On 20 April 2007, el-Attar was found guilty of spying for Israel in an Egyptian courtroom, and sentenced to fifteen years in prison, with no right of appeal. He was accused of being paid to spy on Egyptians and Arabs in Turkey and Canada. He allegedly recruited several new agents in Canada, targeting gays and those he knew were in financial trouble within Arab communities. He used his position at the Canadian Imperial Bank of Commerce to identify potential recruits. He was jointly charged with three Israelis, who were convicted in absentia and also sentenced to fifteen years in prison.

An interrogation transcript alleges that el-Attar told interrogators that he was a homosexual who married and divorced at least four times after arriving in Canada in 2002, and that he was paid $500 for each espionage report he filed on the Toronto Arab community. According to the transcript, el-Attar went to the Israeli embassy in Ankara and asked for a job, and the Israelis advised him to convert to Christianity and relocated him to Canada. introduced him to Catholic leaders in Turkey who schooled him in the religion. The transcript says that el-Attar cited his conversion to Christianity and the fact that he is gay, in applying to the United Nations for refugee status from Egypt.

According to his lawyer, el-Attar was directed to focus his efforts on Arabs whose native states bordered Israel — Syrians, Jordanians, Lebanese, Egyptians and Palestinians. The lawyer further said el-Attar flew to Cairo on 1 January 2007 at the behest of his handlers who had asked him to make amends with his family. From there, he was supposed to travel to Israel. When arrested, el-Attar was in shock about the amount of information the Egyptian authorities had compiled and felt it was best to confess.

Later, el-Attar claimed he confessed only after days of torture. He said he was forced to drink his own urine, was given electric shocks, and that his family in Egypt was threatened. During his trial, most of the evidence came from his confession, which he signed after spending at least three weeks incommunicado, with no consular assistance and no lawyer. El-Attar was released from prison in 2022.

== See also ==
- Tuncay Güney
