= Mehmet Eymür =

Turkish intelligence official (1943–2024)

Mehmet Eymür (5 September 1943 – 13 January 2024) was a Turkish intelligence official. In 1995–1996, he led the counter-terrorism department of the National Intelligence Organization (MİT), which he joined as a student in 1965 as a "pursuit officer" (Turkish: takip memuru). He was the right-hand man of MİT deputy undersecretary Hiram Abas.

== Background and personal life ==
Eymür was born in Istanbul in 1943 as the son of Mazhar Eymür, a leading member of the MİT's predecessor, the National Security Service (MAH). Mazhar Eymür took part in suppressing the Dersim rebellion.

Eymür joined the agency after completing TED Ankara Koleji. He attended the İstanbul Academy of Economic and Financial Sciences (Turkish: İstanbul İktisadi ve Ticari İlimler Yüksek Okulu).

Eymür had a spouse named Canset; a son, Alp, and a daughter, Ayşe. According to some sources, Mehmet Eymur and his wife, Canset Eymur were granted a green card by the Department of Homeland Security.

== Career ==
=== MIT (1965–1988) ===
Eymür joined MIT as a student in 1965 as a "pursuit officer" (Turkish: takip memuru), and was involved in the Ziverbey Villa interrogations after the 1971 Turkish coup d'état, together with Hiram Abas.

Eymür gained fame for taking down numerous gangsters in the 1984 "Godfathers Operation" (Turkish: Babalar Operasyonu) while heading the Smuggling Department, in concert with Atilla Aytek of the police force's smuggling department (Turkish: Emniyet Kaçakçılık ve Harekat Dairesi Başkanı). The operation captured mob bosses including Dündar Kılıç.

Eymür prepared the controversial 1987 MİT Report that accused high ranking civil servants in the police and politicians such as Nevzat Ayaz, Ünal Erkan, and Mehmet Ağar of having connections to the mafia. The report was leaked, and published in 2000'e Doğru in January 1988. He was forced to resign on 10 June 1988. The MIT said the report was prepared without proper authorization. His colleague Hiram Abas, who was deputy chief of MIT and also discharged at the time, was critical of Eymür for divulging information.

Eymür subsequently entered the ice producing business in Antalya with a MİT colleague called Korkut Eken, however this partnership ended after five years on acrimonious terms.

=== MIT (1993–1999) ===
After Tansu Çiller became prime minister in mid-1993, Eymür was appointed chief of the MİT's Special Intelligence Department (Turkish: Özel İstihbarat Dairesi) in May 1994. Avni Özgürel of Radikal says that the department was led by Hiram Abas. Next came the Operations Department (Turkish: Operasyon Başkanlığı), where he was deputy chief to Şenkal Atasagun. The two did not get along, so Eymür asked the undersecretary, Sönmez Köksal, for a different position.

==== Counter-Terrorism Department (1995–1996) ====
On 31 January 1995, he was moved to the newly established Counter-Terrorism Department. The department, created on Çiller's orders, was active in the Kurdish–Turkish conflict.

According to Eymür, he was at this time introduced to contract killer Mahmut Yıldırım, better known as Yeşil, after Yeşil was moved to Ankara by JİTEM. Eymür said he was then unaware of Yeşil's status as a wanted criminal. Eymür said he used Yeşil in several operations, but only outside Turkey, and that he was never formally an MİT agent. At the Counter-Terrorism Department, Eymür said he almost had the PKK's leader, Abdullah Öcalan, assassinated, but failed due to irresponsible management of fiscal resources and sabotage (external, and inside the agency).

When Mesut Yılmaz replaced Çiller as prime minister in March 1996, he ordered the fifty-person department dissolved. Yılmaz said that the MİT strongly opposed Eymür's gang, and that such illegal activities now take place in the General Directorate of Security (police force) instead. Yılmaz said that the illegal group was loyal to Fethullah Gülen, a notable religious figure. In a testimony to the Susurluk commission investigating the Susurluk scandal, Hanefi Avcı, former chief of the police force's intelligence department, said that Eymür's "gang" was illegal.

==== Final years ====
Eymür prepared what has come to be known as the Second MİT Report (the first was in 1987), based on the "Askar Simitko, Lazım Esmaeili and Tarık Ümit incident" file from his Counter-Terrorism Department. This report was controversial for being prepared without authorization, and then leaked in September 1996. It was published in Aydınlık on 17 September 1996.

In August 1997 Eymür was assigned to Washington, D.C. as a MİT representative to U.S. intelligence agencies and security firms. He was recalled on 14 August 1998. Eymür returned to Turkey in 1998 to help prepare a report against Şenkal Atasagun, then the undersecretary of the MİT, who had recommended Eymür's dismissal and the dissolution of his Counter-Terrorism Department to Prime Minister Yılmaz in 1997. In October 1998 Eymür was appointed to oversee Turkey's sugar refineries.

Eymür finally left the MİT in 1999, and moved to McLean, Virginia; the headquarters of the CIA. He says he would entertain offers to consult the CIA as a terrorism expert. In March 2000 he launched a website documenting links between the Turkish state and the Turkish mafia; he faced criminal charges for divulging state secrets.

Eymür died on 13 January 2024, at the age of 80. Next day, he was buried at Aşiyan Asri Cemetery.

== Ergenekon ==
From 2008 Eymür was mentioned numerous times in the Turkish press as being the superior of Tuncay Güney; the mysterious figure, who helped launch the Ergenekon investigation. Eymür vehemently denied any connection.

== Books ==
- Ferhat Ünlü (2001), Eymür'ün aynası: eski MİT yöneticisi anlatıyor, Metis Yayınları
- Talat Turhan, Orhan Gökdemir (1999), Mehmet Eymür: Ziverbey'den Susurluk'a bir MİT'çinin portresi, Sorun Yayınları
