= Fikret Emek =

Fikret Emek (born 20 September 1963 in Emirdağ) is a retired soldier from the Special Forces Command (Turkish: Özel Kuvvetler Komutanlığı, ÖKK); a special forces unit active in the Kurdish–Turkish conflict.

He was one of the first people detained in the Ergenekon investigation; an investigation into a supposed neonationalist organization that allegedly planned to overthrow the Turkish government. The investigation started when 27 grenades allegedly belonging to him were discovered following a then anonymous tip-off.

== Biography ==
Emek was born in Emirdağ. In 1985 he graduated from the Turkish Military Academy (Turkish: Kara Harp Okulu). Later he joined the ÖKK, and retired in 2005.

He lives close to his widowed mother in Eskişehir.

== Ergenekon ==
He is notable for possessing the most munitions of any person detained in the investigation; more than enough to flatten a twelve-floor reinforced concrete building. His mother was safekeeping the munitions which he allegedly had seized from PKK militants while on duty. (Note: Personally keeping weapons belonging to the enemy is illegal in Turkey.) Also confiscated were numerous documents including classified military information, (Note: Such as the country's "most secret" document, the National Security Policy Document (Turkish: Milli Güvenlik Siyaset Belgesi), also known as the Red Book.) and black lists.

On 5 August 2013 Emek was sentenced to 41 years and four months.
