= Turkish Revenge Brigade =

Turkish nationalist organization

- Türk İntikam Tugayı
- Dates active: 1979–present
- Ideology: Ultranationalism
- Size: Unknown
- Wars: the Political violence in Turkey and the Kurdish–Turkish conflict

The Turkish Revenge Brigade (Turkish: Türk İntikam Tugayı, TİT), also referred as the Turkish Vengeance Brigade, is a militant Turkish nationalist organisation that has used violence against those they perceive as insulting Turkey. In the political violence of the 1970s, TİT gained notoriety during political clashes and is believed to be responsible for over 1,000 deaths during this period. After the military coup of 1980, most of its members were arrested. They were later released and utilised by the Turkish military intelligence in operations during the Kurdish–Turkish conflict.

== Activity ==
=== 1979 ===
In 1979, police arrested a man named Cengiz Ayhan in Mersin on charges of being the leader of the Turkish Revenge Brigade. Ayhan denied the charges and claimed he was falsely accused of involvement in the group due to his opposition to leftist groups in Turkey.

=== 1993 ===
According to Human Rights Watch, the murders of parliamentary deputy Mehmet Sincar and the journalist Ferhat Tepe in 1993 were carried out in TİT's name. Later, it was found that Sincar was assassinated by Kurdish Hezbollah, who intended to assassinate Nizamettin Toğuç.

=== 1996 ===
In 1996, it is reported that they were involved with the murder of Turkish Cypriot journalist Kutlu Adalı.

=== 1998 ===
TİT claimed responsibility for an armed attack in 1998 on the then Turkish Human Rights Association president, Akın Birdal, in which he was critically wounded. The perpetrator was the TİT's leader, Mehmet Cemal Kulaksızoğlu received a diplomatic passport by rogue National Intelligence Organization officer, Yavuz Ataç. That time Mehmet Cemal Kulaksızoglu never serve with Ataç but they were close friends. The boss of Kulaksizoglu was Mehmet Eymür.

=== 2005 ===
Human Rights Association President, Eren Keskin and two HRA board members received death threats while in Istanbul.

=== 2008 ===
In 2008, a man named Vatan Bölükbaşı was arrested during the Ergenekon trials. Bölükbaşı later identified himself as a member of TİT and said that he is moving by orders of Veli Küçük.
