= First Merchant Bank (Northern Cyprus) =

Former bank of Northern Cyprus

First Merchant Bank OSH Ltd (FMB) was an offshore bank of Northern Cyprus established in 1993. As an offshore bank it was not regulated by the Central Bank of the Turkish Republic of Northern Cyprus, and not allowed to trade with Northern Cyprus residents. In August 2004 the US Financial Crimes Enforcement Network (FinCEN) designated it "a financial institution of primary money laundering concern" under Section 311 of the Patriot Act. The Northern Cyprus Ministry of Finance withdrew FMB's banking license in February 2007, and by April 2008 the bank's Ireland-registered major shareholder and its subsidiaries appeared defunct.

This company is not associated with First Merchants Bank, National Association or First Merchants Corporation located in Muncie, Indiana USA.

== Overview ==
In the wake of the Susurluk scandal, Turkish deputy Fikri Sağlar said that Turkish intelligence official Tarık Ümit, assassinated in 1995, had been a joint shareholder of the FMB with Kayzer Mahmood Butt, the private office manager of Saudi Prince Faisal.

In 2004 the US Financial Crimes Enforcement Network (FinCEN) "found that reasonable grounds exist for concluding that First Merchant Bank is a financial institution of primary money laundering concern." The reasons for this included the bank's involvement in "the marketing and sale of fraudulent financial products and services" and that "the individuals who own, control, and operate First Merchant Bank have links with organized crime and apparently have used First Merchant Bank to launder criminal proceeds." FinCEN noted that partners of FMB included "a former KGB employee identified as Vladimir Kobarel", and former Turkish intelligence official Tarık Ümit. FinCEN pointed out links with the Turkish Susurluk scandal, noting that according to press reports, "First Merchant Bank, Tarik Umit, and [Bank President] Dr. Hakki Yaman Namli are alleged to have been involved with the laundering of $450 million in narcotics proceeds for the Susurluk gang."

The Northern Cyprus Ministry of Finance withdrew FMB's banking license in February 2007, and by April 2008 the bank's Ireland-registered major shareholder and its subsidiaries appeared defunct.
