= Necabettin Ergenekon =

Turkish Army officer (1926–2020)

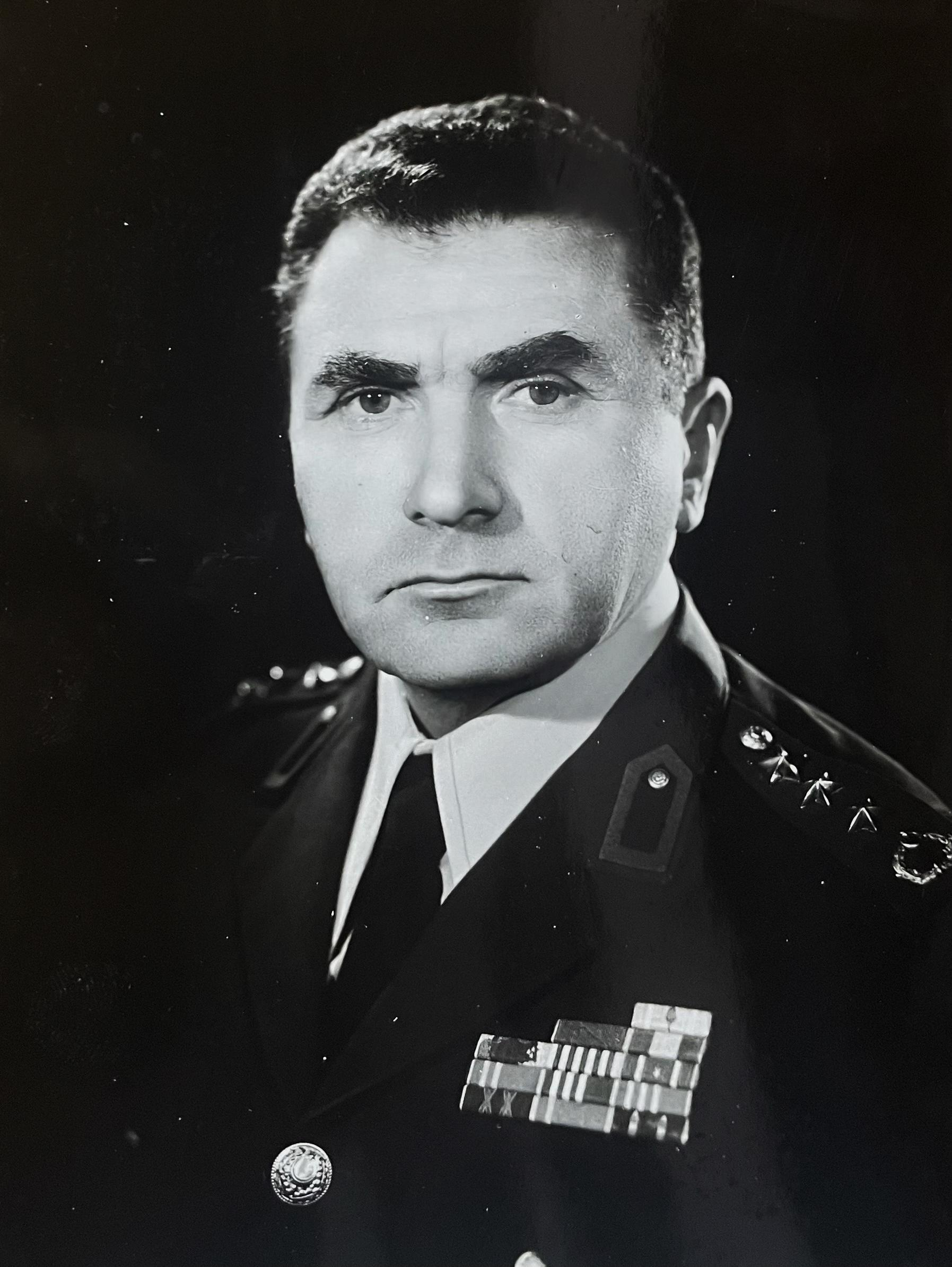
- Ergenekon in 1980
- Born: Necabettin Baltacı; 1926; Erzurum, Turkey
- Died: 23 October 2020 (aged 93–94)
- Allegiance: Turkey
- Branch: Gendarmerie General Command

Colonel Necabettin Ergenekon (1926 – 23 October 2020) was a Turkish Army officer. He retired in 1982, having been commander of the Turkish Gendarmerie in Adıyaman Province after the 1980 Turkish coup d'état.

Born in Erzurum in 1926 as Necabettin Baltacı, he changed his name "some time in the '60s" to avoid confusion with another person by the same name. At one time, Ergenekon was the commanding officer of Veli Küçük. Ergenekon was suspected by later-assassinated state prosecutor Cevat Yurdakul as being behind a string of mysterious deaths in the 70s, but no legal action was ever taken.

With the development of public discussion about the Ergenekon organization in the 2000s, Ergenekon's name has sometimes been raised as a possible participant, possibly even responsible for its naming. Ergenekon rejects these allegations and says his name (chosen for the Ergenekon myth) has been besmirched by traitors. Key Ergenekon trials witness Tuncay Güney claims Ergenekon introduced him to Veli Küçük, a key defendant in the trials. Güney also alleged that Ergenekon had had discussions with Recep Tayyip Erdoğan in the 1980s. In December 2008 Yeni Şafak claimed that Ergenekon had led the 1995 Azeri coup d'état attempt, which had support from elements in Turkey.

Ergenekon died from COVID-19 on 23 October 2020, at the age of 94.
