= Orhan Taşanlar =

Turkish civil servant

Orhan Taşanlar is a Turkish civil servant. He was a chief of police and a regional governor.

== Biography ==
He was Istanbul Chief of Police (2 November 1995 - 18 April 1996) and then Governor of Bursa Province (23 April 1996 - 30 September 1999). He had a close relationship with businessman Erol Evcil.

He was also the Ankara Chief of Police.
