= Semih Tufan Gülaltay =

Turkish militant (born 1968)

Semih Tufan Gülaltay (born 1968, in Kars) is the founder of the militant Turkish Revenge Brigade, and the National Unity Party (Turkish: Ulusal Birlik Partisi).

He was sentenced to nineteen years in prison for the attempted killing in 1998 of Human Rights Association chairman Akın Birdal, but released 4.5 years later on amnesty. He hid in the home of Ergenekon suspect Muzaffer Tekin's retired friend, major Zihni Ozansoy, after the Birdal incident.

One of the highest ranking soldiers detained in the Ergenekon investigation, Hurşit Tolon, was also known to the meetings of Gülaltay's party, UBP. On 5 August 2013 Gülaltay was sentenced to twelve years in prison as part of the Ergenekon trials.
