= Kürşat Yılmaz =

Far-right Turkish mob boss

Yakup Kürşat Yılmaz
- Born: 3 March 1961 (age 64); Giresun, Turkey
- Occupation: Mafia Boss
- Spouse: Tülay Çelik (m. ?–2016)

Yakup Kürşat Yılmaz (born 3 March 1961) is a Turkish mob boss with links to the ultranationalist (Grey Wolves) Turkish mafia. He was arrested in Bulgaria in July 1998, having escaped from prison in Turkey three times (1994, February 1997 and February 1998). He had been sentenced to 19 years for arranging the 1995 murder of former Kuşadası Mayor Lütfi Suyolcu. He claimed that he had been told his sentence would be annulled if he killed businessman Halil Toprak, and that he had been given Hepatitis C in Bulgaria in order to prevent him speaking about his connections.

After he escaped to Bulgaria, he was detained in Varna in 1998 and subsequently extradited back to Turkey in April 1999.

He was released on October 30, 2021, after his lawyers requested a retrial in 2021.
