= Haşim İşcan =

Turkish politician (1898–1968)

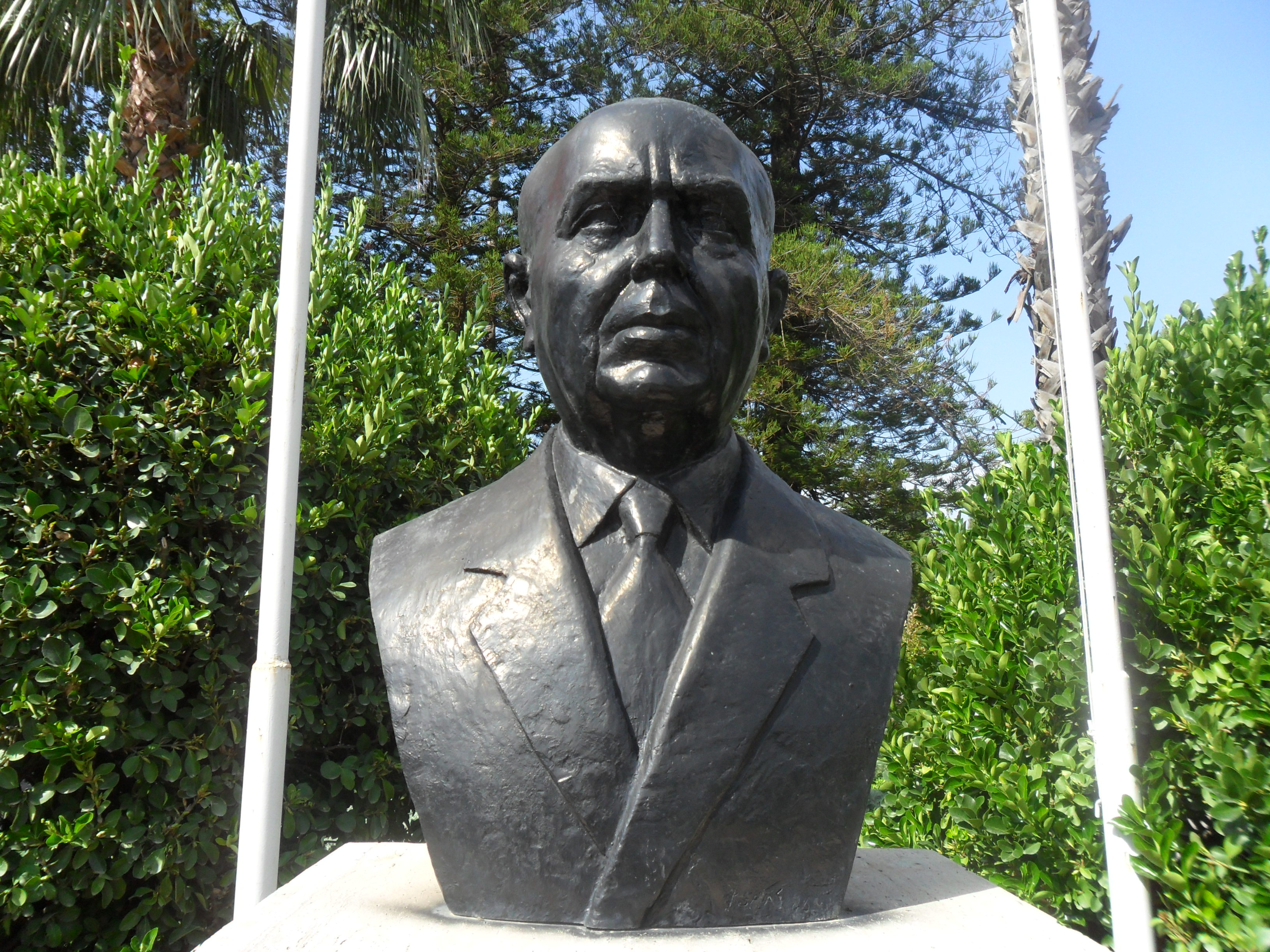

Mayor of Istanbul
- In office 10 December 1963 – 11 March 1968
- Preceded by: Necdet Uğur
- Succeeded by: Faruk Ilgaz

Personal details
- Born: 1898; Edirne, Turkey
- Died: 11 March 1968 (aged 69–70)
- Cause of death: Intracranial hemorrhage
- Political party: Republican People's Party (CHP)

Haşim İşcan (1898 Edirne, Adrianople Vilayet – March 11, 1968, Istanbul) was a Turkish high school teacher, province governor and the first elected mayor of Istanbul.

== Biography ==
He was born 1898 in Edirne. After graduating from the School of Public Management in 1922, he became an instructor in the Edirne Teacher College for Girls and later in the Edirne High school. From 1933 on, Haşim İşcan served as a public administrator, beginning in districts and then as governor in several provinces, including Governor of Bursa Province (1945–1950). Shortly before his retirement, he was appointed public director for settlement affairs.

He was married to Atıfet İşcan.

== Political career ==
In 1963, he entered politics with the Republican People's Party (CHP), and was elected mayor of Istanbul. During his time in office, he accomplished major infrastructure projects in Istanbul, like broader streets and underpasses. He also contributed much to the development of cultural activities in the city. The beloved mayor was called "Father Haşim" by the residents.

He died on March 11, 1968, in coma caused by intracranial hemorrhage. An underpass in Saraçhanebaşı, next to the Civic Center, is named in his memorial.

== Sources ==
- Biyografi.net - Biography of Haşim İşcan (in Turkish)

Political offices
Preceded by Necdet Uğur	Mayor of İstanbul; 1963–1968	Succeeded by Faruk Ilgaz
