= Levent Ersöz =

Turkish brigadier general

- Born: 19 April 1954 (age 72)
- Military career
- Allegiance: Turkey
- Branch: Turkish Army
- Service years: 1975–2005
- Rank: Brigadier general
- Unit: Gendarmerie

Levent Ersöz (born 19 April 1954) is a former Turkey brigadier general in the Turkish Gendarmerie, who was head of the Gendarmerie's JITEM intelligence department. He was considered a key defendant in the Ergenekon trials, and on 5 August 2013 was sentenced to 22 years and six months. He was released on 11 March 2014. A trial charging Ersöz with the death of Turkish President Turgut Özal in 1993 began in September 2013. Ersöz was found innocent and received an amnesty in March 2016.

Prosecutors have accused Ersöz of being behind the 2001 assassination of Diyarbakır Police Chief Gaffar Okkan and a 2006 attack on Faruk Çelik, and of having had a role in the 1993 death of President Turgut Özal. The prosecution has shown a video of Ersöz talking to Bedrettin Dalan in 2004, saying "You are number three. Why don't you go out and talk like you're number one." Police searching Ersöz' home had found nearly 2500 recordings of conversations.

Prosecutors have charged a hitman with a December 2009 attempt on Ersöz' life, describing it as an attempt to silence Ersöz. Shots were fired into the ceiling during a confrontation between the would-be assassin and gendarmes guarding Ersöz' room.

A suspect in the Ergenekon trials told prosecutors that Ersöz was his instructor in TUSHAD.
