= Murder of Andrea Santoro =

2006 murder in Trabzon, Turkey

Andrea Santoro (7 September 1945, in Priverno, Italy – 5 February 2006, in Trabzon, Turkey) was a Catholic priest in Turkey, murdered in Trabzon, where he served as a member of the Catholic Church's Fidei donum missionary program.

The murder was one of Turkey's high-profile anti-Christian incidents, along with the murder of Armenian journalist Hrant Dink and the Zirve Publishing House murders that focused attention on hate crimes in Turkey.

== Murder ==
On 5 February 2006, Santoro was shot dead from behind while kneeling in prayer in the Santa Maria Church. A witness heard the perpetrator shouting "Allahu Akbar".

=== Perpetrator ===
Oğuzhan Akdin, a 16-year-old high school student, was arrested two days after the shooting, carrying a 9 mm pistol. An investigation by the U.S. Air Force Office of Special Investigations on stolen weaponry revealed that this gun had been part of a batch of guns that the United States had given to the Iraqi army but which had gone missing. The student told police he had been influenced by the Jyllands-Posten Muhammad cartoons controversy. The murder was preceded by massive anti-Christian propaganda in the Turkish popular press. In the three months before his murder, Santoro's telephone had been tapped by the Turkish police in Trabzon.

== Aftermath ==
At Santoro's funeral at the Basilica of St. John Lateran, Cardinal Camillo Ruini, the vicar of the Diocese of Rome, mentioned in his homily that the possible beatification process for Santoro may be opened after February 2011. His assassination is marked annually by the Don Andrea Santoro Association, which is organized in part by Cardinal Angelo De Donatis, the Vicar General of Rome and a seminary classmate of Santoro.

Pope Benedict XVI recalled his martyrdom in his homily at the Shrine of Meryem Ana Evi (House of the Virgin Mary) in Ephesus on 29 November 2006.

As the murderer of Armenian-Turkish journalist Hrant Dink also came from Trabzon and was also under 18 years of age, Turkish police were investigating possible connections between the slayings of Santoro and Dink. On 10 October 2006, Oğuzhan Akdin was sentenced to 18 years, 10 months, and 20 days in prison for "premeditated murder" by a juvenile court in Trabzon. According to head of the local Catholic administration, the Apostolic Vicariate of Anatolia, Bishop Luigi Padovese, neither the killer nor his mother showed any remorse during the trial. In October 2007, Turkey's Court of Appeals affirmed the jail sentence for Santoro's killer. Following the 2016 Turkish coup d'état attempt, the killer was released from jail after serving less than 10 years of his sentence.

== See also ==
- List of assassinated people from Turkey
- Attempted assassination of Pope John Paul II
- Freedom of religion in Turkey
