= Şamil Tayyar =

Turkish politician (born 1965)

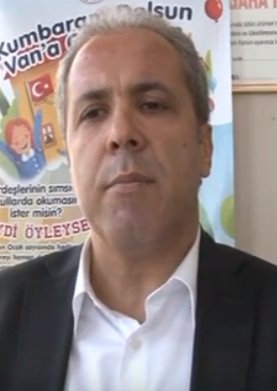
- Şamil Tayyar

Personal details
- Born: January 1, 1965 (age 61) Gaziantep, Turkey
- Party: Justice and Development Party
- Occupation: Politician, journalist

Şamil Tayyar (born 1 January 1965 in Gaziantep) is a Turkish journalist, author, and deputy for the Justice and Development Party (AKP) since 2011. He is a columnist with the daily Star and has contributed to Yeni Şafak, Milliyet and Sabah. He has published a book on the Ergenekon trials, Operation Ergenekon.

In December 2009 Tayyar was sentenced to 20 months' imprisonment for his book "Operation Ergenekon" (tr: Operasyon Ergenekon) on the grounds that he had violated the duty to observe secrecy of an investigation and tried to influence a fair trial. The sentence was suspended for five years.

== Books ==
- Refahyol Tutanakları (Ümit Yayıncılık, Ankara, 1997)
- 5n 1Kamyon (Birharf Yayınları, 2006)
- Operasyon Ergenekon (Timaş Yayınları, İstanbul, 2008)
- Gölge İktidar (Timaş Yayınları, İstanbul, 2008)
- Kıt'a Dur! (Timaş Yayınları, İstanbul, 2009)
