= Türk Ticaret Bankası =

- Company type: Bank
- Industry: Banking
- Founded: 1913
- Defunct: 9 August 2002
- Headquarters: Istanbul, Turkey
- Products: Financial services
- Parent: TMSF
- Website: www.turkticaretbankasi.com.tr

Türk Ticaret Bankası A.Ş (TTB, English: Turkish Trade Bank), also known as Türkbank, was founded in 1913 in Adapazarı by private investors as a regional bank under the name of Adapazarı İslam Ticaret Bankası. It was renamed Türk Ticaret Bankası A.Ş in 1937, and relocated its head office to Istanbul in 1952.

Türkbank was taken over by the Turkish Treasury in 1994 after the bank was weakened by the Turkish financial crisis of the time. After a privatization scandal in the late 1990s, which caused the collapse of the government of Mesut Yılmaz, resulted in the planned privatization to fail, the bank went into liquidation on 9 August 2002.

== See also ==
Türkbank scandal
