= Dündar Kılıç =

Turkish mob boss (1935–1999)

- Born: Dündar Alikılıç; 1935; Sürmene, Trabzon, Turkey
- Died: 10 August 1999 (aged 63–64); Istanbul, Turkey
- Occupation: Crime boss
- Spouse: Ayten Kılıç (m. ?–1999)
- Children: Cenk Ali Kılıç

Dündar Kılıç (real name Dündar Alikılıç; 1935 – 10 August 1999) was an infamous boss in the Turkish underworld. He earned himself the nickname of being the 'godfather of godfathers'.

== Early life and rise in underworld ==
Dündar Kılıç was born in 1935 in a village of the Surmene District of Trabzon in the eastern Black Sea Region, Turkey. He moved to Ankara with his family when he was nine years old, and got his first gun a year later. His first arrest was at the age of 14, by the 1960s he was already known as one of Ankara's leading criminals. His primary income came from extortion and illegal gambling, and he became known as the 'good godfather', allegedly because he would only have his people collect money from those already involved in illegal deals. Eventually the authorities caught up with him and he was arrested and jailed for a murder he committed in 1960.

== Release from prison and continued rise ==
Kılıç was released from prison in 1965. Upon his release, he soon set up various 'offices' around Istanbul that were to be used as part of an illegal check and bond trading operation. During this period he received financial help from Kurtoglu family.

After this, Kılıç's run-ins with the law only increased. He was alleged to be involved in at least three murders, narcotics and weapons smuggling and was interrogated by police hundreds of times. Despite going away to prison for long periods, he would easily control his operations from behind bars and his absence was barely felt. Working for Kılıç became a sign of prestige in the underworld. He, supposedly got some help from "Derin Devlet", a phrase used among Turkish for an unknown unit in the state which conducts covert operations.

Kılıç was arrested as part of a large scale joint operation against organized crime by Turkey's National Intelligence Organization (MİT) and local police in 1984. Initially arrested on 11 different charges, Kılıç was taken to a prison in Ankara's Mamak.

== Murder of daughter ==
Kılıç's daughter, Nuriye Uğur Kılıç, was shot dead on January 20, 1995 by a gunman sent by her ex-husband, another mob boss named Alaattin Çakıcı. Kılıç retreated into his summer house and went into deep mourning. It is still unknown why this did not lead to a full-scale gang war between Kılıç and Çakıcı, and it is rumored that it was in fact an honour killing jointly ordered by Kılıç and Çakıcı, and this is why he did not take steps to avenge his daughter. Uğur had allegedly betrayed Çakıcı while the two were still married, and Kılıç would not stand for this.

== Death ==
Kılıç died on 10 August 1999 in the American Hospital in Istanbul at the age of 64. Prior to his death, he was already battling eye cancer, heart and lung problems. Dündar Kılıç was interred in Zincirlikuyu Cemetery in Istanbul.
