= Lazım Esmaeili =

Iranian spy (1945-1996)

- Born: 1945; Urmia, Iran
- Died: January 28, 1996 (aged 50–51); Istanbul, Turkey
- Cause of death: Ballistic trauma
- Occupations: Heroin smuggler and intelligence contractor
- Known for: Victim of political murder

Lazım Esmaeili (also "Lazem") (1945–28 January 1995) was a Kurdish Iranian drug smuggler operating in Turkey, who was found tortured and shot dead by unknown agents of Turkish and Iranian intelligence in Istanbul.

== Background ==
Esmaelli was born 1945 in Urmia (West Azarbaijan province) in Iran as a son of Selim.

He moved to Turkey and received a work permit from the Ministry of Interior's General Directorate of Security for the period between May 20, 1991, and September 20, 1992. As of September 1991, he was the partner of the Beyazıt Foreign Trade Co. in Istanbul, where he worked as director. On September 11, 1993, he received a residence permit valid for two years.

== Death ==
On January 14, 1995, he and his partner Askar Simitko were abducted when they left the casino of Polat Renaissance Hotel in Yeşilköy, Istanbul at local time 03:45 or 03:30 am. On January 28, 1995, villagers found the corpses of the two in Kerev Creek, Silivri, about 60 km (37 mi) far from Istanbul. They were tortured, ears cut and shot multiple times.

== See also ==
- List of kidnappings
- List of unsolved murders (1980–1999)
- Lists of solved missing person cases
