= Askar Simitko =

Kurdish Iranian spy

Askar Simitko, alternative spellings use "Asghar Smitko", or "Asghar Simko" (1953 – January 28, 1995) was a Kurdish Iranian heroin smuggler and intelligence contractor operating in Turkey.

On January 14, 1995, he and his partner Lazım Esmaeili, were abducted by unknown persons when they left the casino of Polat Renaissance Hotel in Yeşilköy, İstanbul at local time 03:45 or 03:30. On January 28, 1995, villagers found the corpses of the two in Kerev Creek, Silivri, about 60 km (37 mi) far from İstanbul.

== See also ==
- List of unsolved murders (1980–1999)
