= Ergenekon (organization) =

Purported state-sponsored ultranationalist organization in Turkey

Ergenekon (Turkish: [ˌæɾɟeneˈkon]) was the name given to an alleged clandestine, secular ultra-nationalist organization in Turkey with possible ties to members of the country's military and security forces. The would-be group, named after Ergenekon, a mythical place located in the inaccessible valleys of the Altay Mountains, was accused of terrorism in Turkey.

Some believed Ergenekon was part of the "deep state". The existence of the "deep state" was affirmed in Turkish opinion after the Susurluk scandal in 1996. Alleged members had been indicted on charges of plotting to foment unrest, among other things by assassinating intellectuals, politicians, judges, military staff, and religious leaders, with the ultimate goal of toppling the incumbent government.

Ergenekon's modus operandi had been compared to Operation Gladio's Turkish branch, the Counter-Guerrilla. By April 2011, over 500 people had been taken into custody and nearly 300 formally charged with membership in what prosecutors described as "the Ergenekon terrorist organization", which they claimed had been responsible for virtually every act of political violence—and controlled every militant group—in Turkey over the last 30 years.

As of 2015 most of those accused of such crimes had been acquitted, forensic experts concluded the documents for supposed plots were fake and some of the executors of trials proved to be linked to the Gülen Movement and were charged with plotting against the Turkish Army.

== Overview ==
An organization named "Ergenekon" has been talked about since the Susurluk scandal, which exposed a similar gang. However, it is said that Ergenekon has undergone serious changes since then. The first person to publicly talk about the organization was retired naval officer Erol Mütercimler, who spoke of such an organization in 1997. Mütercimler said he heard of the original organization's existence from retired general Memduh Ünlütürk, who was involved in the anti-communist Ziverbey interrogations following the 1971 coup. Major general Ünlütürk told Mütercimler that Ergenekon was founded with the support of the CIA and the Pentagon. Mütercimler was detained during the Ergenekon investigation for questioning before being released.

Mütercimler and others, however, draw a distinction between the Ergenekon of today and the original one, which they equate with the Counter-Guerrilla; Operation Gladio's Turkish branch. Today's Ergenekon is said to be a "splinter" off the old one. The person whose testimony contributed most to the indictment, Tuncay Güney, described Ergenekon as a junta related to the Turkish Resistance Organization (Turkish: Türk Mukavemet Teşkilatı, TMT) operating in North Cyprus; the TMT was established by founding members of the Counter-Guerrilla. Former North Cyprus President Rauf Denktaş denied any connection of the TMT to Ergenekon.

Another position is that while some of the suspects may be guilty of something, there is no organization to which they are all party, and that the only thing they have in common is opposition to the AKP. There is evidence to suggest that some – but only some – of the defendants named in the indictments have been engaged in illegal activity and that others – again far from all – hold eccentric or distasteful political opinions and worldviews. There are also allegations that Ergenekon's agenda is in line with the policies of the National Security Council, elaborated in the top-secret "Red Book" (the National Security Policy Document).

Based on documents prepared by one of the prosecutors, an article in Sabah says that the alleged organization consists of six cells with the following personnel:

- Secret and civil cells liaisons: Veli Küçük and Muzaffer Tekin
- Lobbyists: M. Zekeriya Öztürk, Kemal Kerinçsiz, İsmail Yıldız, and Erkut Ersoy
- NGO head: Sevgi Erenerol, Kemal Kerinçsiz (assistant)
- Theory, Propaganda, and Disinformation Department head: Doğu Perinçek
- Mafia structuring head: Veli Küçük, Muzaffer Tekin (assistant)
- Underground contacts: Ali Yasak, Sami Hoştan, Semih Tufan Gülaltay, and Sedat Peker
- Terrorist organizations heads: Veli Küçük and Doğu Perinçek
- University structuring: Kemal Yalçın Alemdaroğlu, Emin Gürses, Habib Ümit Sayın
- Research and information gathering head: Mehmet Zekeriya Öztürk
- Judicial branch heads: Kemal Kerinçsiz, Fuat Turgut, and Nusret Senem

Of those, the structure of only the "Theory" department had been revealed as of September 2008.

Some have called Veli Küçük the leader in the organization. Şamil Tayyar of the Star daily says that Küçük is not "even among the top ten". Turkey's National Intelligence Organization (MİT) reportedly informed the prosecutor about the identity of the "number one" in the organization, but this will not be made public.

In most cases the name is shown as having derived from the Ergenekon myth; a place in Eurasia of mythological significance, esp. among nationalists (see Agartha). The legend was vigorously promulgated during the early years of the Turkish Republic as Atatürk sought to create a nation state in which national consciousness rather than religion served as the primary determinant of identity. With the growing number of detentions and subsequent court cases (see: Ergenekon (trials)) not many people still really understand what is happening.

== Discovery ==
Although the investigation was officially launched in 2007, the existence of the organization was known beforehand. The files on Ergenekon were said to be discovered after a spy called Tuncay Güney was detained in March 2001 for petty fraud. Some say the crime was a ploy to set the investigation in motion. A police search of his house turned up the six sacks of evidence on which the indictment is based.

One month later, a columnist on good terms with the government, Fehmi Koru, was the first to break the news, under his usual pen name, Taha Kıvanç. His article was based on a key Ergenekon report dated 29 October 1999, and titled "Ergenekon: Analysis, Structuring, Management, and Development Project".

=== Tuncay Güney's testimony (2001) ===
The person whose statements to the police in 2001 formed "the backbone of the indictment" was a spy named Tuncay Güney, alias "İpek". Güney is believed to be subordinate to Mehmet Eymür, formerly of the National Intelligence Organization (MİT)'s Counterterrorism Department. Eymür was discharged and his department disbanded in 1997. Güney's relationship to the MİT has been a matter of confusion; his boss was once a MİT employee, while the MİT says Güney was not (specifically, he was not a "registered informant") and that the MİT considered him a suspicious person.

He had allegedly been tasked with infiltrating the gendarmerie's intelligence agency (JITEM) and Ergenekon in 1992. Güney was apprehended in 2001 for issuing fake licenses and plates for luxury cars. He is still sentenced in absentia for this offense. No charges have been brought against him in the frame of the Ergenekon investigation, some say as a result of a bargain struck with the authorities. However, he is currently under investigation, and State Prosecutor Ziya Hurşit Karayurt has proposed that he be subpoenaed. The court is deliberating whether to consolidate his earlier case with the Ergenekon one. In addition, legal proceedings have been initiated to obtain his testimony from abroad using Interpol. Prosecutor Öz has prepared a list of 37 questions for Güney, who says he will cooperate if the questioning is done by the Canadian police.

Güney has been said to conflate fact and fiction, casting doubt over the indictment, which names him a "fugitive suspect" (Turkish: firari şüpheli). Güney is seen as such an important figure that rival press groups have exchanged columns accusing one another of attempting to influence public opinion by questioning his credibility. It is alleged that one of the parties, Aydın Doğan, was asked not to publish material about Ergenekon, by Veli Küçük through Doğu Perinçek. In December 2008, Güney said that a Hürriyet reporter offered him a bribe not to talk about the newspaper, one of whose senior members is allegedly in Ergenekon. Hürriyet denied the allegations.

=== Weapons found ===
A number of Weapons found in the Ergenekon investigation form a key part of the Ergenekon trials, prosecuting the Ergenekon organization. The Ergenekon investigation officially began after an anonymous tip led to the finding of 27 grenades in Ümraniye, a district of Istanbul. The serial numbers of these grenades matched those of grenades found in other locations and some used in terrorist attacks.

== Legal proceedings ==
The first hearing was held on 20 October 2008. Retired public prosecutor Mete Göktürk estimated that they would last at least one year. Most of the cases related to Ergenekon are handled by Istanbul Heavy Penal Court 12 and 13 (formerly Istanbul State Security Court 4 and 5). The original three prosecutors were Zekeriya Öz (prosecutor-in-chief), Mehmet Ali Pekgüzel and Nihat Taşkın. The judge was Köksal Şengün. Most trials are held at a prison complex in Istanbul's Silivri neighborhood. At the beginning the courtroom could accommodate about 280 people.

The investigation drew alleged links between an armed attack on the Turkish Council of State in 2006 that left a judge dead, a bombing of a secularist newspaper, threats and attacks against people accused of being unpatriotic and the 1996 Susurluk incident, as well as links to the plans of some groups in the Turkish Armed Forces (TSK) to overthrow the present government. According to the investigation, Ergenekon had a role in the murder of Hrant Dink, a prominent journalist of Armenian descent Italian priest Father Andrea Santoro in February 2006 and the brutal murders of three Christians, one a German national, killed in the province of Malatya in April 2007. Furthermore, files about JİTEM related the assassination of former JİTEM commander Cem Ersever, killed in November 1993, to Ergenekon. A former JİTEM member, Abdülkadir Aygan, said that JİTEM is the military wing of Ergenekon.

The indictment also suggests questionable connections between Ergenekon and the outlawed Kurdistan Workers' Party (PKK) and the Revolutionary People's Liberation Party/Front (DHKP/C), raising some suspicions that Ergenekon might have played a role in inciting ethnic hatred between Turks and Kurds and increasing sectarian tensions between Sunnis and Alevis. The Gülen movement-affiliated Zaman newspaper quoted a senior intelligence officer, Bülent Orakoğlu, as having said that the PKK, Dev Sol, Hezbollah, and Hizb ut-Tahrir are artificial organizations set up by the network, and that Abdullah Öcalan himself was an Ergenekon member. However, Zaman's claims have been disputed, and the role of the broader Gülen movement in the trials has come under scrutiny.

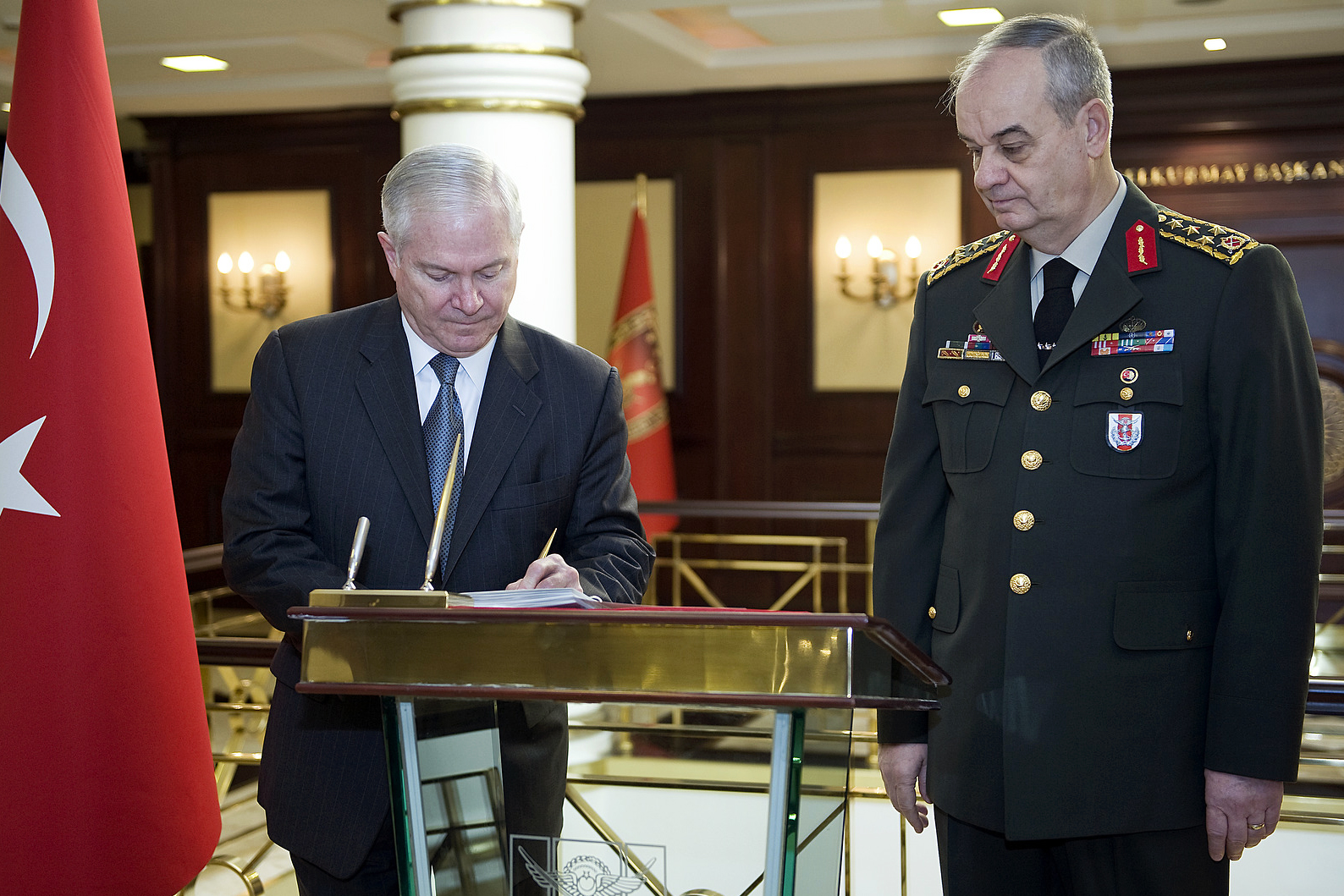
Turkish Chief of General Staff Gen. İlker Başbuğ with U.S. Defense Secretary Robert Gates. Başbuğ was sentenced to life imprisonment as part of the Ergenekon trials.

Öcalan dismissed allegations made by intelligence officer Bülent Orakoğlu concerning himself, but he did say that a group inside the PKK, which he called the Zaza Group, had links with Ergenekon. He said that this group was led by Sait Çürükkaya and tried to seize control of the PKK, adding "Particularly in the Diyarbakır-Muş-Bingöl triangle, they have staged intensive and bloody attacks". The brother of Sait Çürükkaya, Selim Çürükkaya had earlier written a book "When secrets get decoded" (tr: Sırlar Çözülürken) accusing Abdullah Öcalan of being a member of Ergenekon.

Responding to allegations in Taraf, DHKP/C issued a press release ridiculing claims of its connection to Ergenekon.

By May 2009, 142 people had been formally charged with membership of the "Ergenekon armed terrorist organization" in two massive indictments totalling 2,455 and 1,909 pages respectively. Further trials followed and in March 2011 the state-owned Turkish Radio and Television Corporation (TRT) presented the following figures:

- So far 176 hearing in the first trial. After the case was merged with the case related to an armed attack on the Turkish Council of State in 2006 the number of defendants increased to 96
- So far 107 hearings in the second trial
- Investigation under the titles of "cage action plan" (tr: Kafes Eylem Planı), "planned assassination of admirals" (tr: Amirallare Suikast) and "Poyrazköy" (village in Beykoz district of Istanbul) were merged as the Poyrazköy case. There are 69 defendants, seven of them in pre-trial detention
- An indictment as part of the Ergenekon investigations carries the title: "Plans to intervene in democracy" (tr: Demokrasiye Müdahale Planı)
- Another court case around the Association for Support of Contemporary Life (tr: Çağdaş Yaşamı Destekleme Derneği ÇYDD) and the Foundation for Contemporary Education (tr: Çağdaş Eğitim Vakfı ÇEV) was to start on 18 March 2011, with eight board members on trial
- Arms found in Şile on 28 July 2008, resulted in a trial with four defendants, two of them in pre-trial detention
- A trial has been ongoing following several raids of the offices of OdaTV and the homes of many of its personnel in 2011. In the case, fourteen journalists are charged with conspiring with Ergenekon

== Debate on Ergenekon ==
In August 2008, 300 intellectuals from Turkey declared their support for the investigation and called upon all civil and military institutions to deepen the investigation in order to reveal the rest of the people tied to Ergenekon. This initial wave of optimism has since waned, and there is a growing mass of intellectuals and policy analysts who dismiss the possibility of Ergenekon carrying out the deeds attributed to it by the public prosecution as laid out in the indictment and trial proceedings. Many people have criticized the manner in which the Ergenekon investigation is being conducted, citing in particular the length of the indictment, wiretapping in breach of privacy laws, and illegal collection of evidence.

Some commentators have suggested the trials are being used to suppress opponents and critics of the AKP government, particularly in the Odatv case. Commenting on the arrest of former chief of staff İlker Başbuğ in January 2012, former United States Ambassador to Turkey Eric S. Edelman said the Ergenekon arrests "underscore the serious questions about Turkey's continued commitment to press freedom and the rule of law".

== Alleged involvement of Gülen Movement ==
Gülen movement's possible involvement in Ergenekon plot has always been an issue of debate, which critics have characterized as "a pretext" by the government "to neutralize dissidents" in Turkey. In March 2011, seven Turkish journalists were arrested, including Ahmet Şık, who had been writing a book, "Imamin Ordusu" (The Imam's Army), which alleges that the Gülen movement has infiltrated the country's security forces. As Şık was taken into police custody, he shouted, "Whoever touches it [the movement] gets burned!". Upon his arrest, drafts of the book were confiscated and its possession was banned. Şık has also been charged with being part of the alleged Ergenekon plot, despite being an investigator of the plot before his arrest.

In a reply, Abdullah Bozkurt, from the Gülen movement newspaper Today's Zaman, accused Ahmet Şık of not being "an investigative journalist" conducting "independent research," but of hatching "a plot designed and put into action by the terrorist network itself."

According to Gareth H. Jenkins, a Senior Fellow of the Central Asia-Caucasus Institute & Silk Road Studies Joint Center at Johns Hopkins University:

From the outset, the pro-AKP media, particularly the newspapers and television channels run by the Gülen Movement such as Zaman, Today's Zaman and Samanyolu TV, have vigorously supported the Ergenekon investigation. This has included the illegal publication of "evidence" collected by the investigators before it has been presented in court, misrepresentations and distortions of the content of the indictments and smear campaigns against both the accused and anyone who questions the conduct of the investigations.
There have long been allegations that not only the media coverage but also the Ergenekon investigation itself is being run by Gülen's supporters. In August 2010, Hanefi Avcı, a right-wing police chief who had once been sympathetic to the Gülen Movement, published a book in which he alleged that a network of Gülen's supporters in the police were manipulating judicial processes and fixing internal appointments and promotions. On 28 September 2010, two days before he was due to give a press conference to present documentary evidence to support his allegations, Avcı was arrested and charged with membership of an extremist leftist organization. He remains in jail. On 14 March 2011, Avcı was also formally charged with being a member of the alleged Ergenekon gang.

The Gülen movement has also been implicated in what both Prime Minister Recep Tayyip Erdoğan as well as the opposition Republican People's Party (CHP) have said were illegal court decisions against members of the Turkish military, including many during the Ergenekon investigation.

== See also ==
- Sledgehammer (coup plan)
- Sarıkız, Ayışığı, Yakamoz and Eldiven
