= 1995 Azerbaijani coup attempt =

Failed coup with some Turkish backing

1995 Azerbaijani coup d'état attempt
- Part of the Post-Soviet conflicts
Date	13–17 March 1995
Location	Baku, Azerbaijan
Result	Coup failed

Belligerents
Special Purpose Police Unit; Turkish putschists Supported by: Nationalist Movement Party	Government of Azerbaijan; Azerbaijani Armed Forces; Supported by: Government of Turkey; Russia

Commanders and leaders
(Azerbaijan) Rovshan Javadov †	(Azerbaijan) Heydar Aliyev (Azerbaijan) Safar Abiyev; Supported by: (Turkey) Süleyman Demirel (Russia) Boris Yeltsin

Casualties and losses
8 putschist police officers killed	23 pro-government forces killed (22 soldiers and 1 police officer); 7 wounded

The 1995 Azerbaijani coup d'état attempt, also known as the Turkish coup in Baku, was a coup d'état attempt by members of the Azerbaijani military, led by Colonel Rovshan Javadov at the head of a detachment of Special Purpose Police Unit (OPON). The group aimed to take control of the country from president Heydar Aliyev and reinstall former president Abulfaz Elchibey. The coup was foiled when the Turkish President Süleyman Demirel became aware of elements in Turkey supporting the plot, and called Aliyev to warn him. On 17 March 1995, units of the Azerbaijani Armed Forces surrounded the insurgents' camp and assaulted it, killing Colonel Javadov. Reports in Turkey following the 1996 Susurluk scandal elaborated on support for the coup from elements in Turkey.

== Events ==
On 12 December 1994 a team of people, including Korkut Eken (Turkish National Intelligence Organization, MİT), İbrahim Şahin and Ayhan Çarkın (Turkish Police Special Operations Department) and Abdullah Çatlı (contract killer), traveled from Turkey to Azerbaijan in order to train a unit of 60 OPON police officers for the coup. They were invited by OPON commander Rovshan Javadov, a KGB defector to the CIA, who also directed the abortive coup. The KGB/FSB and CIA closely monitored events.

According to the newspaper Yeni Şafak, the coup was directed by Turkish colonel Necabettin Ergenekon, while he was allegedly the commander of the Adıyaman Gendarmerie Regiment. However, other newspapers report that he retired in 1982 from the Adıyaman Martial Law Command (Turkish: Adıyaman Sıkıyönetim Komutanlığı). Yeni Şafak also alleged that Elchibey is related to Turkish General Veli Küçük.

The coup was foiled after the MİT tipped off President Süleyman Demirel on 10 March 1995 and he called Aliyev. On 17 March 1995, units of Azerbaijani Armed Forces surrounded the insurgents in their camp and assaulted it, killing Javadov.

== Motivations ==
According to a 1996 MİT report, Turkish prime minister Tansu Çiller gave minister Ayvaz Gökdemir, police chief Mehmet Ağar, İbrahim Şahin, and Korkut Eken the green light to install Elchibey as president. Elchibey was an ideological ally of Turkish Nationalist Movement Party (MHP) politician Alparslan Türkeş, who harbored aspirations of creating a Turkic state stretching across the Caucasus. Türkeş' support of the coup attempt also provoked a diplomatic crisis between Turkey and Azerbaijan, and the latter country officially requested a statement refuting the section of the report dealing with the attempted coup.

The 1996 Susurluk report (following the Susurluk scandal) said that Prime Minister Çiller's chief counselors, Acar Okan and Süleyman Kamil Yüceoral, were involved in the coup attempt. Susurluk Commission member Fikri Sağlar argued that the purpose of the coup was to secure the narcotics route from Afghanistan. Sağlar pointed out that Yüceoral was involved in paying Afghan warlord Rashid Dostum from a slush fund.

Later press reports claimed that the Ergenekon gang, of which General Veli Küçük is a suspected member, was responsible for the coup attempt, indicating a relationship between Susurluk and Ergenekon.

== Bibliography ==
- de Waal, Thomas (2003). Black Garden: Armenia and Azerbaijan Through Peace and War. New York: New York University Press. ISBN 978-0-8147-1945-9.
- 1998 Report (PDF) (Report). Ankara: Human Rights Foundation of Turkey. 2000. Archived from the original (PDF) on 5 February 2009. (contains the Susurluk reports in the annex, and material on the Counter-Guerrilla) (in English)
