= Ayhan Çarkın =

Public police officer

- Born: 1962 (age 63–64)
- Known for: Role in the Susurluk Scandal and his allegations about the Pınarcık massacre
- Police career
- Country: Turkey
- Allegiance: Turkey: True Path

Ayhan Çarkın (born 1962, Erzurum) is a Turkish policeman who is reported to have played a controversial role in the Susurluk scandal.

== Biography ==
Çarkın grew up in Erzincan. Because he came from an underprivileged family that was unable to fund his education, he dropped out of high school. In 1984, he signed up for the Turkish police force, receiving training in special warfare from Korkut Eken. He was deployed in Diyarbakır underleader of the Special Operations Department (Turkish: Özel Harekât Dairesi), İbrahim Şahin, who named Çarkın as the most fearless policeman he had ever met. He gained a reputation for quickly conducting raids—350 in all— in southeast Turkey from 1986 to 1990.

Later, Şahin took Çarkın to Istanbul to target Dev-Sol militants. He led a raid on July 12, 1991, in which eleven were killed; Relatives of the victims sued him thereafter, and the European Court of Human Rights ruled that Turkey would not be subject to extrajudicial executions in this operation. Çarkın's next raid was on April 16, 1992; three were killed. Twenty people, including Çarkın were sued; this time he was acquitted. Another was the "Perpa" raid on August 13, 1993, in which Selma Çıtlak, Mehmet Salgın, Sabri Atılmış, Hakan Kasa, and Mehmet Akyürek were killed. Five of the eight participating policemen were initially sentenced to death, but this was reduced to three years and ten months in prison. They were all acquitted by the Supreme Court of Appeals.

== Susurluk scandal ==
Çarkın was involved in the events that led to the scandal. Specifically, he was part of the elite Police Special Operation Teams department (Turkish: Özel Tim) that was responsible for assassinating businessmen suspected of financially supporting the PKK. One of these was allegedly the so-called "casino king", Ömer Lütfü Topal, assassinated in July 1996. Çarkın's associates included Ayhan Akça, Oğuz Yorulmaz, Ercan Ersoy, and the notorious Abdullah Çatlı. Three (excluding Çatlı) were detained but released on the orders of the chief of police, Mehmet Ağar, and transferred to become bodyguards for another key figure in the scandal, Sedat Bucak.

Bucak was a True Path Party deputy as well as the leader of a 20–30,000-strong armed clan. He was the only survivor of the November 1996 Susurluk car crash (in which Çatlı died), thanks to his bodyguards. Since the assassinations were extrajudicial (the public did not know that the state had sanctioned them), Çarkın was tried again. He was sentenced to four years in jail; he served twenty months. Çarkın denies having taken part in the Topal assassination. He claims he has alibis; he was leading a unit of five in Kadıköy at the moment the assassination took place.

After the scandal, the Çiller-Erbakan administration was replaced by the Mesut Yılmaz administration. Çarkın alleges that deputies in the Yılmaz administration offered him a passport to enable him to flee, but he refused, since he believed he was innocent.

Çarkın began to speak out. He alleges that the state, using the clandestine Ergenekon network, colluded with militant groups such as the PKK, Dev-Sol, and Hezbollah, with the goal of profiting from the war.

== Smuggling ring ==
In January 2011, Turkish police announced that, after a nine-month investigation, they had uncovered a smuggling and bribery ring operating in Istanbul that dealt mostly with smuggling cigarettes. Ayhan Çarkın was alleged to be involved in the scheme, along with others suspected of involvement in the Susurluk scandal.
