= İbrahim Şahin =

İbrahim Şahin (born 20 August 1956) is a Turkish ultranationalist and co-conspirator in the murder of the Armenian journalist Hrant Dink. He led General Directorate of Security's special forces unit, the Special Operations Department (Turkish: Özel Harekat Dairesi) and, following dismissal in 1996 for associating with ultra-nationalist drug trafficker and contract killer Abdullah Çatlı, was tarnished by complicity in the wide-ranging government conspiracy which became known as the Susurluk scandal. The event, which began with the November 1996 car crash which killed Çatlı and other prominent individuals, resulted in Şahin's arrest and subsequent acquittal. His career, however, was effectively ended, and there were additional weapons-related charges in 1999, with a six-year prison term imposed in 2001. In 2008 he suffered a memory-impairing traffic accident and, in 2009, was among 37 highly placed officials named in the government investigation of deep state organization Ergenekon.

== Career from 1976 to 1996 ==
A native of the Anatolian city of Tokat, the capital of Tokat Province, İbrahim Şahin began his police career at the age of 20, following graduation from the police academy in 1976. Holding the rank of assistant superintendent, he was assigned to the police unit in another provincial capital, Sinop. In 1978, he fulfilled his military duties in Erzurum and the Isparta Commando School and four years later, in 1982, joined the police force of yet another provincial capital, Bitlis, in Eastern Anatolia. Later that year he transferred to the newly formed Special Operations Department and completed a course in Special Operations from the Turkish General Staff's Special Warfare Department (Turkish: Özel Harp Dairesi).

In 1984 he was sent to Germany for commando training from the country's Federal Police elite counter-terrorism and special operations unit GSG 9 and, in 1987, travelled to the United States to receive additional counter-terrorism training. The following year he was appointed head of Special Operations branch assigned to the police of yet another provincial capital in Southeastern Anatolia, Siirt. By 1990, he was in Istanbul, performed the same duty for the capital city's police and, in 1993, was chosen by director general of the General Directorate of Security and organizer of the Police Special Forces (Özel Harekat Dairesi), Mehmet Ağar, as the first commander of Special Operations for the entire police force. Special Operations became particularly active in the conflict with Kurdish separatists, and carried out covert operations, such as assassinations of those suspected of lending support to the Kurdistan Workers' Party.

== Susurluk scandal ==
The fatal car crash, which occurred on 3 November 1996 in the small northwestern town of Susurluk, exposed links between politics, organized crime and the bureaucracy, referred to in Turkish as the derin devlet [deep state]. Upon Çatlı's death in the crash and the exposure of Şahin's intertwined connections to him, Şahin was dismissed from his posts and investigated for protecting members of the police department who were involved in the assassination, three months before the Susurluk crash, of controversial businessman Ömer Lütfü Topal, known as the "casino king", as well as those implicated in the abduction of another shady operative, Tarık Ümit.

Tansu Çiller, Turkey's first female prime minister, who served from June 1993 to March 1996, requested Şahin's return to the police force and said that he was owed an apology. However, on 27 January 1997 a warrant was issued for his arrest and although he initially eluded capture, on 6 March he was charged with 5–9 years in jail for felony and surrendered within five days later, ultimately being acquitted six months later, on 12 September. After a passage of eighteen months, in March 1999, he was charged for up to year's imprisonment for allegedly losing weapons donated to the police. Nine years later, on 28 March 2008, he was in a serious traffic accident and lost his memory. On 14 April he was sentenced to one year in jail for negligence. His deposition in May was ineffectual because of his memory problem. He and his subordinate Korkut Eken were initially handed a six-year sentence. This was later reduced to 486 days. Şahin's plea to president Ahmet Necdet Sezer to pardon the rest on account of his ill health was granted.

== Ergenekon investigation ==
Şahin was one of 37 people detained in the Ergenekon investigation's January 2009 wave of arrests. The Turkish police said the round-up was triggered by orders Şahin gave to assassinate twelve Armenian community leaders in the provincial capital of Sivas Province.

A map describing the location of an arms cache was found in his house. A team of excavators found the following in Gölbaşı, Ankara:

- 9 mm caliber bullets
- boxed explosive
- ignition mine
- plastic explosives
- two lightweight anti-tank weapons
- 10 hand grenades whose serial number had been deleted
- 10 smoke bombs used in training with colored smoke

According to the police, the weapons were wrapped in newspapers from 2004. Excavations in other parts of Ankara have been launched.
