= Medet Serhat =

Turkish attorney and statesperson

Medet Serhat (1931 in Iğdır – 12 November 1994 in Istanbul) was a Kurdish lawyer, from an aristocratic family of the Igdir branch of the widely dispersed Retkan tribe. He was a prominent member of the Istanbul Bar Association, and was known for having support from both Kurds and Turks from different political viewpoints. He represented many Kurdish and Turkish political and business figureheads, including Behçet Cantürk, who was also assassinated in 1994.

== Early life and education ==
Serhat was born in Iğdır (then part of Kars Province) to İsa and Bahar Serhat. He graduated from the Faculty of Law at Istanbul University.

== Career ==
He was imprisoned for 13 months in 1959 before being released. When the Supreme Court quashed the verdict, he was sentenced in a re-trial to 10 months and 20 days in prison. The case related to a group of university students having Kurdish identity, and going through their higher education with Kurdish identity instead of assimilating to a Turkish identity. The court described the students as "Kurdish Communists", an accusation used frequently by the Turkish state during the Cold War era. The case was known as 49lar (English: 49ers) as there were 49 suspects.

Serhat was prosecuted without arrest in 1963, accused of having disseminated Kurdish propaganda in the journal Denge, which he published in Istanbul. In 1965, he was sentenced to 1 year 4 months in prison for establishing a Kurdish organization.

In 1975, he was elected Principal Member of Discipline Committee of Board of Directors of Istanbul Bar Association from Çağdaş Avukatlar Grubu (Modern Lawyers Group). In 1977, he attended the International Lawyers Meeting in Zagreb, Yugoslavia. In 1978, he was elected Istanbul Representative of "İttihad-i Vatani Kürdistan" (Union of the Kurdish Nation) which was active abroad parallel to Jalal Talabani.

Serhat was a candidate for Kars from the list of the Republican People's Party (CHP) in the local elections held in 1979. In 1980, he joined the Communist Party of Turkey (TKP) as a provisional member. He was detained on 27 January 1981 on charges of disseminating communist and Kurdish propaganda and was released on 29 January.

In 1982, he joined the defence in a Kurdistan Workers' Party (PKK) trial launched in Erzurum, as well as trials in Istanbul and Diyarbakir. In the same year, he was arrested for membership of the Executive Board of the Peace Association, and released in November 1983. In 1984, he acted as the lawyer of Behçet Cantürk, who was involved in drug trafficking, for one case only.

Serhat was among the founding members of the Kurdish Rights and Freedoms Foundation, established in İstanbul in 1990 with the aim of establishing the Kurdish National Union, and in this respect establishing a national assembly and a Kurdish political party on a legal platform. In 1991, he had clients among the defendants of the "Peace Committee Association" trial. He was a signatory to the declaration of the "Call for the Democracy Assembly", written during the General Assembly of the Democracy Party (DEP) held in Ankara on 18 and 19 December 1993. He was also one of the defence lawyers for MPs from the defunct Democracy Party (DEP) in the trial launched against them at Ankara SSC in October 1994.

== Assassination ==
Serhat was killed along with his driver outside his house in Erenköy, Istanbul, on 12 November 1994. His wife was also shot while trying to cover her husband Medet at the back seat of their car. She was wounded by 14 bullets; she survived, but has remained disabled. In her statements she was unable to give any details about the attackers face, until she saw Nurullah Tevfik Agansoy on television.

Medet Serhat's murder was declared an extrajudicial killing, and is still unsolved. The murder had a huge impact, with approximately 5,000 people both Turkish and Kurdish marching at his funeral. His colleagues from the Istanbul Bar Association attended with their courthouse robes.

His name was mentioned as a murder organized by the deep state in the Susurluk Scandal, and in 2010 his family asked to be officially listed as victims of the Ergenekon following confessions made by the organization members.

In April 2024 his grave has been vandalised just before traditional Eid al fitr (Şeker Bayramı) grave visit clearly by sledgehammers as clearly by necropolitics of Turkish State.
