= Parliamentary immunity in Turkey =

Parliamentary immunity in Turkey exists since the Turkish constitution was accepted in 1924. It is meant to grant immunity to the members of the Grand National Assembly of Turkey before the judiciary and has been based on the parliamentary immunity which France has as well. Parliamentary immunity can be lifted if the parliaments majority votes so. The Constitutional Court was created in 1962, and has the authority to ban political parties and also ban people from holding a political office, and if those are members of parliament, then they are also not protected by the parliamentary immunity. The new constitution of 1982 also included a parliamentary immunity, but in the case an investigation under Art. 14 of the constitution has been initiated before the politicians election into parliament, the courts could be allowed to carry on with the proceedings.

For decades, the Turkish military led establishment held a major degree of influence in the decisions of the civilian population and the political parties for decades. It was worried that through the parliamentary immunity the Islamist parties would achieve to impose Islam on the political agenda or that Kurds would demand more autonomy in South East Turkey.

== Prominent examples ==
=== DEP lawmakers ===
After the oath ceremony in November 1991, during which Leyla Zana wore a headscarf in the colors yellow, green and red and ended with a Kurdish phrase, Orhan Doğan and Hatip Dicle had handkerchiefs in the same colors, proceedings against the parliamentarians began. Initially protected by their parliamentary immunity, pressure amounted during the premiership of Tansu Çiller, when measures were taken to lift the parliamentary immunity in early 1994. After a discussion in parliament during which the True Path Party (DYP) politician Coşkun Kırca argued that the parliamentary immunity of the pro-Kurdish politicians of the People's Labour Party (DEP) should be withdrawn as it was detrimental for the Turkish nation to continue to enable them to be included in the "democratic process" the parliamentary immunity was lifted from six DEP deputies on the 2 March 1994. Following, Orhan Doğan, Leyla Zana, Hatip Dicle and Selim Sadak were arrested and sentenced to 15 years imprisonment for membership in the Kurdistan Workers' Party (PKK). They were all released after 10 years.

=== Mehmet Ağar and Sedat Bucak ===
After the Susurluk accident in 1996 in which the Turkish drug trafficker Abdullah Catli and a police chief died and the Kurdish warlord Sedat Bucak survived. Investigation into a cooperation between the Turkish government and organized called the Susurluk scandal ensued. In 1997, the prosecutor demanded to lift the parliamentary immunity from Sedat Bucak and Mehmet Ağar (the Interior Minister at the time of the accident). But the court only lifted the parliamentary immunity in 1998. But also after the court consented, the two had the proceedings postponed when they were re-elected. Hence, proceedings against Bucak began in 2002, the year he was not elected anymore. Bucak was sentenced to 1 year and 15 days imprisonment. Ağar was prosecuted in 2009 when he was not re-elected to parliament. In 2012 he was sentenced to 5 years imprisonment but after one year imprisonment he was released on probation.

=== Attila Kart ===
In 2002 the MP of the oppositional Republican People's Party (CHP) Attila Kart requested his parliamentary immunity to be lifted in order to be able to defend himself in court. The request was denied following which he appealed to the European Court of Human Rights (ECHR) where the first chamber ruled in his favor but in the Grand Chamber Kart lost to the Turkish Government.

=== Sebahat Tuncel ===
In the parliamentary election of 2007, Sebahat Tuncel was a candidate for parliament of the Thousand Hopes alliance supported by the Democratic Society Party (DTP) while imprisoned for terrorism related charges. Upon her election she was released in order to be able to assume her seat in parliament. She was subsequently re-elected several times. In May 2016 the parliament voted to withdraw her parliamentary immunity upon which she was arrested in November 2016.

=== Ömer Faruk Gergerlioğlu ===
In March 2021, Ömer Faruk Gergerlioğlu had his parliamentary immunity lifted and was expelled from parliament after his sentence of 2 years and 6 months imprisonment for a tweet which included an article with a demand for peace negotiations by a member of the PKK was confirmed by the Court of Cassation.
