= Mehmet Ali Yaprak =

Turkish businessman and drug trafficker

Mehmet Ali Yaprak (1949 in Nizip – 4 January 2004) was a Turkish businessman and drug trafficker, who was involved in the Susurluk scandal. He died in Kartal Prison in January 2004 after falling into a diabetic coma. Yaprak was kidnapped on 25 April 1996 and released a week later. He was a major figure in the captagon trade.

Yaprak was ostensibly a businessman with a television channel (Yaprak TV), a radio station, and a tourism company (Hidayet Turizm). However, he also led a feared gang that smuggled Captagon via Syria and Saudi Arabia, according to the Susurluk scandal MİT report. His tourism company facilitated the trafficking. The report says that Yaprak donated 500 billion Lira to support Mehmet Ağar's electoral campaign. Upon learning of Yaprak's wealth, Abdullah Çatlı and a team of 6–7 dressed in police uniform kidnapped Yaprak on 25 May 1996 and took him to a house in Siverek belonging to the Bucak clan. The kidnapping, motivated by the desire to know where the Captagon was coming from and cut Topal out of the loop, was directed by police in Ankara. Yaprak paid 10 million DM in ransom, however Çatlı and his fellow kidnappers received only a small portion of this. When they found out that they had been cheated, they fell out with their overlords in Ankara. They then kidnapped Yaprak a second time and interrogated him, sending one copy of the interrogation tape to Bucak and another to Eymür through MİT agent Müfit Sement. Leveraging the tapes, Çatlı worked out an agreement with Ankara.

Yaprak was convicted in 1997 for involvement in the assassination of Gaziantep Bar lawyer Burhan Veli Torun, and released due to an amnesty law (Turkish: Şartlı Salıverilme Yasası). In 2002, he was re-imprisoned after being caught with 5 million pills of Captagon. He died in prison, January 2004.
