= Hanefi Avcı =

Former Turkish chief of police

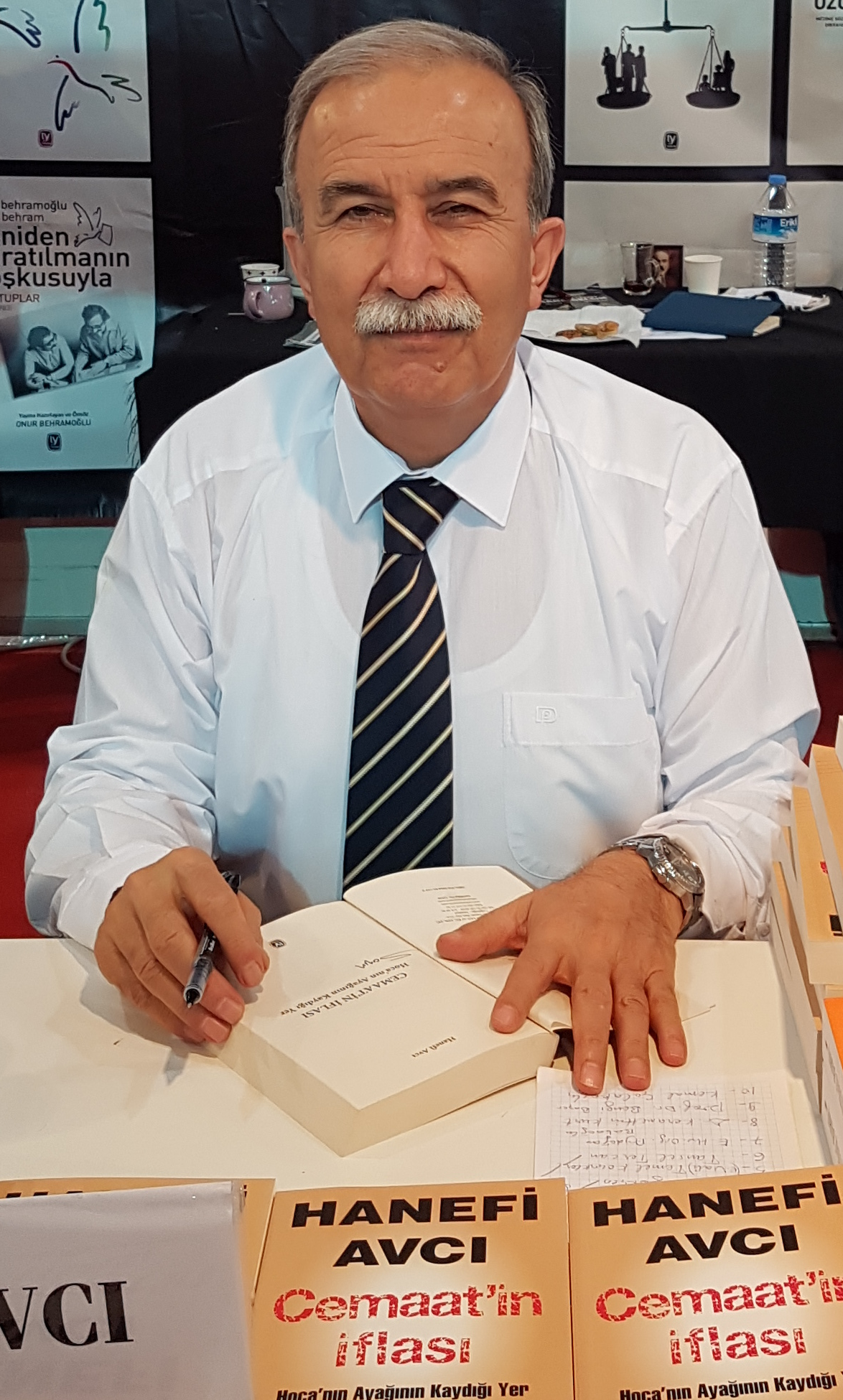

Hanefi Avcı (born 1956, Kahramanmaraş Province) is a former chief of police in Turkey, and author of the best-selling book Haliç’te Yaşayan Simonlar, in which Avcı claimed that the Gülen movement had infiltrated the police and manipulated key trials such as the Ergenekon trials through judges and prosecutors close to the movement. Avcı, a conservative Islamist, was himself once close to the movement, and his children were educated in a Gülen school. Avcı, who in the 1990s testified to parliament in relation to the Susurluk scandal and in 2009 to prosecutors about the mafia links of the Ergenekon organization, was the first Turkish state official to confirm the existence of the Turkish Gendarmerie's JİTEM intelligence unit.

Shortly after publishing the book, Avcı was arrested, accused of leaking information to the nominally Marxist–Leninist Devrimci Karargâh. Later he was additionally charged with being connected with the Ergenekon organization, in the odatv case.

== Career ==
From 1976 to 1984 he was active in the police in Mersin Province, involved in anti-terror operations. During this time he was responsible for several deaths by torture; in 1997 he met some of his torture victims and apologised. From 1984 to 1992 he worked in the police in Diyarbakir, before being appointed the head of the Istanbul Intelligence Branch (İstanbul İstihbarat Şube Müdürlüğü) in 1992. He was promoted to Vice President of the Intelligence Department (İstihbarat Daire Başkan Yardımcılığı) in 1996. His statements to the parliamentary commission investigating the Susurluk scandal, on the links between the police, intelligence services and organised crime saw him suspended from the police; he was later reinstated.

In 2003 he was appointed head of the Police Department of Smuggling and Organised Crime. According to Avcı, he was too successful in this position, and as a result was moved to Police Chief of Edirne Province in 2005. After uncovering a police corruption scandal in Edirne, he was moved to become Police Chief of Eskişehir Province in 2009. In 2009 he told prosecutors in the Ergenekon trials that state officials in the police, Turkish Gendarmerie, and National Intelligence Organization had formed a "mafia-like" organization which used the war against the PKK as an opportunity for profit. He said Veli Küçük, a key suspect in the trials, had links to known mafia leaders.

== Book and arrest ==
In 2010 he published the auto-biographical book Haliç’te Yaşayan Simonlar: Dün Devlet Bugün Cemaat, which covered various aspects of the "deep state" in Turkey, including the Ergenekon organization and the Gülen movement's infiltration of the police. Avcı's book claimed that the Gülen movement had highly placed people with privileged access to wire taps, and would publish information obtained this way when it suited it. He said he was one of those wire-tapped. The book also said that various high-profile investigations, including the Ergenekon trials and the Sledgehammer trial, were being manipulated by the Gülen movement through judges and prosecutors associated with the movement. The book was a best-seller. The book received "conflicting reactions" in the Turkish media.

In September 2010 Avcı was arrested and accused of links with the terrorist group Devrimci Karargâh, which he denies, saying that he had "been expecting these kinds of defamations". He was accused of using a phone line belonging to Necdet Kılıç, an alleged Devrimci Karargâh member. Kılıç said he knew Avcı only because Avcı had tortured him in the 1970s when Kılıç was accused of membership of the short-lived THKP-C. He was also accused of passing secret information relating to investigation of DK to Kılıç, based on evidence found in Avcı's office; Avcı said it had been planted. In 2011 he was additionally charged as part of the Odatv case of the Ergenekon trials, on the basis of documents allegedly found at odatv. At around the same time a request for an Article 301 trial in connection with his book was denied. In 2013 prosecutors demanded a 50-year prison sentence. In July 2013 Avcı was convicted of aiding a terrorist organisation and of trying to influence a trial with his book, and sentenced to 15 years 3 months.

== Bibliography ==
- Hanefi Avcı, Haliç’te Yaşayan Simonlar: Dün Devlet Bugün Cemaat, Angora Yayıncılık, 2010
- Mehmet Baransu, Mösyö: Hanefi Avcı’nın Yazamadıkları, Karakutu Yayınları, 2010.
- İsmail Saymaz, Hanefi Yoldaş: Gizli Örgüt Nasıl Çökertilir?, Kalkedon Yayıncılık, 2011

== See also ==
- Ahmet Şık's The Imam's Army
