= West Working Group =

Alleged clandestine group within the Turkish military (active c. 1997-2009)

The Batı Çalışma Grubu (BÇG; English: West Study Group or West Working Group) was an alleged clandestine grouping within the Turkish military said to be linked to the Ergenekon organization. It was allegedly set up in 1997 by General Çevik Bir (then deputy-chief of the General Staff of the Republic of Turkey) as part of the process relating to the 1997 military memorandum (the "post-modern coup"), and active until at least May 2009. The primary activity of the group appears to have been classifying politicians, military personnel, journalists and others according to ethnic background, religious affiliation and political leanings, and to monitor the activity of those considered a potential danger to secularism in Turkey. This included monitoring some religious communities outside Turkey. It has been claimed that in 1997 BÇG had records on 6 million people, and offices in the Higher Education Board (YÖK) as well as in each branch of the military.

== Creation ==
General Çevik Bir (then deputy-chief of the General Staff) has said he set up the group on the orders of then Chief of the General Staff İsmail Hakkı Karadayı, and that it was a legal group defending Turkey, acting on the instructions of the National Security Council in its 28 February meeting and a cabinet meeting in March 1997. According to General Çetin Saner, the head of the Turkish Gendarmerie's Intelligence Department at the time, the BÇG tried to create its own intelligence network, and had asked the Gendarmerie, police and National Intelligence Organization to forward information to it.

One member of the group, who was later expelled from the army for alleged "reactionaryism" (Islamist leanings), said that the meeting he had attended (chaired by General Çetin Doğan) had felt like organising "an army of occupation".

According to media reports in 2010, the group became inactive, and re-activating it under the control of the Naval Forces Command was part of the 2003 "Sledgehammer" coup plan. Other reports said that some time after the 1997 memorandum the group was attached to the Prime Minister's Office, and renamed the Prime Ministry Monitoring Council (Turkish: Başbakanlık Takip Kurulu, BTK). The BÇG's records are said to have been used by the Turkish Army Pension Fund (OYAK) in deciding to dismiss 35 administrators after it took over steel producer Erdemir.

The 2009 Operation Cage Action Plan is alleged by prosecutors in the Ergenekon trials to have had BÇG involvement.

== Investigation ==
In 2009 a group called the Encümen-i Daniş (sharing a name with a short-lived science council in the nineteenth century) came to public attention. According to Susurluk scandal investigator Mehmet Elkatmış, the secretive group was a civilian extension of the Batı Çalışma Grubu, as it was sending reports to ex-Presidents but not the current President. Group member Murat Sökmenoğlu rejected claims of links to the BÇG or Ergenekon, saying it was an informal group set up in 1954, named by Fahri Korutürk.

In 2012 a number of people alleged to have been leaders in the BÇG were arrested, including retired Generals Engin Alan, Çetin Doğan, Ahmet Çörekçi, Teoman Koman, İlhan Kılıç, and Hikmet Köksal. Prosecutors alleged the group met at least twice a week in 1997, and conspired to arrange Recep Tayyip Erdogan's 1999 trial for sedition for reading a poem.

In 2013 the National Security Council rejected a request to release records of the crucial meeting of 28 February 1997.

== See also ==
- Doğu Çalışma Grubu
