= Deep state in Turkey =

Alleged anti-democratic conspiracy in Turkey

The deep state in Turkey (Turkish: derin devlet) is an alleged group of influential anti-democratic coalitions inside the Turkish political structure, composed of high-level elements within the intelligence services (domestic and foreign), the Turkish military, security agencies, the judiciary, and mafia. The political agenda of the deep state network purportedly involves an allegiance to nationalism, corporatism, and state interests. Violence and other means of pressure have historically been employed in a largely covert manner to manipulate political and economic elites, ensuring that specific interests are met within the seemingly democratic framework of the political landscape. Former President Süleyman Demirel said that central to the outlook and behavior of the predominantly military elites who constitute the deep state, is an effort to uphold national interests which have been shaped by an entrenched belief, dating back to the fall of the Ottoman Empire, that the country is always "on the brink".

The alleged ideology of the deep state is anti-socialist, ultranationalist, secularist, anti-Kurdish, anti-democratic, and anti-liberal. As pointed out by former prime minister Bülent Ecevit, the diversity of opinion reflects the diversity of the various deep state coalitions, as the deep state is not so much an alliance, as several groups that work behind the scenes, each in pursuit of its own agenda. Another explanation contradicts the reduction of the deep state to an interest network and defines it as a type of domination based on the high level of autonomy enjoyed by the military that enables the security apparatus to disrupt formal democratic institutions (in the foreground) by employing a sui generis repertoire of informal institutions (in the background), i.e. putsch threat, autocratic cliques, mafia, organized crime and corruption. Rumours of a deep state existing have been widespread in Turkey since Ecevit's term as prime minister in the 1970s, after his revelation of the existence of a Turkish counterpart to Italy's Operation Gladio, the "Counter-Guerrilla". In January 2007, then Prime Minister Recep Tayyip Erdoğan publicly stated his acknowledgement of the existence of the deep state.

Many Turkish citizens, including elected politicians, suspect that the deep state exists, and may hold the key to unexplained events.

== Background ==
According to Robert F. Worth, "The expression 'deep state' had originated in Turkey in the 1990s, where the military colluded with drug traffickers and hitmen to wage a dirty war against Kurdish insurgents". The term (derin devlet) "colloquially speaking" refers to "'criminal' or 'rogue' element that have somehow muscled their way into power" according to Ryan Gingeras. Dexter Filkins describes it as a "presumed clandestine network" of Turkish "military officers and their civilian allies" who, for decades, "suppressed and sometimes murdered dissidents, Communists, reporters, Islamists, Christian missionaries, and members of minority groups—anyone thought to pose a threat to the secular order". Hugh Roberts stated that it is the "shady nexus" between the police and intelligence services, consisting of "certain politicians and organized crime", whose members believe they are authorized "to get up to all sorts of unavowable things" because they are "custodians of the higher interests of the nation".

Charles Tilly wrote of an "interdependence between the historical processes of war-making and state-making and organized crime. 'Banditry, piracy, gangland rivalry, policing and war-making all belong on the same continuum'".

In From Deep State to Islamic State, Jean-Pierre Filiu notes a resemblance between the Mamluks of Egypt and the Levant (1250–1517), and the alleged security service "deep states" of today's the Middle East. In both cases, they proclaimed themselves servants of their state's putative rulers—the Caliph in the case of the Mamluks, and "the People" in the case of contemporary Algeria, Egypt, Syria, and Yemen—while actually ruling themselves.

=== Ottoman Empire ===
Turkish secret societies date back to the Ottoman Empire. Sultan Selim III (reigned 1789–1807), for example, founded a secret committee, essentially a personal army to protect himself since he had been attacked following the wars against Russia and Austria of 1787 to 1792. Even his second-in-command, the Grand Vizier, remained unaware.

Conspiratorial coalitions became particularly active during the Committee of Union and Progress era (1889–1918), when they planned the deposition of the Sultan. One infamous hitman, Yakup Cemil, was employed by the state, and shot on Enver Pasha's command after he was no longer needed. The Special Organization was a secret organization that carried out the Armenian genocide. According to Vicken Cheterian, today's deep state traces its roots to this era:

The clandestine state structures that were set up immediately before the First World War, namely the Special Organization (Teşkilât-ı Mahsusa)—the secret paramilitary organization within the state—was never dismantled. On the contrary, it was celebrated and continued to dominate over the state. This clandestine structure was the main instrument in implementing the Armenian genocide and played a role in the various military coups and crimes against humanity under the republic. When the Kemalist movement came to power, the old CUP structures were not dismantled; Mustafa Kemal used the same network to lead his fight, reinventing the Special Organisation under new names, such as Karakol, which in 1927 became the Milli İstihbarat Teşkilatı (MIT, or the Turkish intelligence services). There is an extra-legal structure within the state that has acted without legal checks and balances, from the Special Organization to the more recent 'Deep State.' The Susurluk scandal in 1996 ... brought to light the reality of the Deep State and its links with the death squads in Kurdistan, organized crime, and international heroin trafficking ... What the [Ergenekon] trial once again revealed was the existence of a network within the state that behaved as the supreme power in the country, obeyed no laws, and used criminal methods to shape the political space ...

Some say that these societies were instrumental in Turkification following the demise of the Ottoman Empire. The secret policy of Turkification was allegedly carried out by covert groups in order for its instigators not to be discovered.

Mustafa Kemal Atatürk (1881–1938) availed himself of secret societies (the Sentinel Association, for example) that today would be considered special forces units to further the republican cause. Some hold that today's alleged deep state is a continuation of these societies.

=== Counter-Guerrilla ===
After World War II, an organized and institutionalized form of the deep state was set up with American guidance to counter a possible Soviet invasion, under the Special Warfare Department (Turkish: Özel Harp Dairesi, or ÖHD). The ÖHD, termed the "Turkish Gladio" by some, was described by its former leader Kemal Yamak as a stay-behind resistance group.

Speaking to Derya Sazak of the daily Milliyet, former Republican People's Party representative Süleyman Genç said that the ÖHD exerted such influence that it hampered the Turkish Armed Forces, and identified the ÖHD as the core of the deep state. Genç pressed for a parliamentary inquiry on the phenomenon in 1978. Still, party chairman and prime minister Bulent Ecevit insisted he drop the matter, after talking to the ÖHD chief, Kemal Yamak, who said that the ÖHD would not interfere in civilian affairs and that politicians should not probe further. Genç's house in Karyağdı Street, Ankara was subsequently bombed on 5 January 1979.

Murat Belge of Istanbul Bilgi University says that the deep state became increasingly active during the multi-party period, as factions within the state vied for power.

=== Grey Wolves ===
Kendal Nezan of the Kurdish Institute of Paris said that Abdullah Çatlı, a Grey Wolves leader who was killed in the Susurluk car crash, "is reckoned to have been one of the main perpetrators of underground operations carried out by the Turkish branch of the Gladio organization and had played a key role in the bloody events of the period 1976–1980 which paved the way for the military coup d'état of September 1980." Abdullah Çatlı had been wanted by the authorities for several things, including his involvement of the murder of seven leftist university students." The investigation identified a falsified passport and gun license signed by the Turkish Interior Minister Mehmet Agar, who had met with the group shortly before the accident. Çatlı was seen in the company of Avanguardia Nazionale founder Stefano Delle Chiaie, while touring Latin America and on a visit to Miami in September 1982.

Apart from Çatlı, ultra-nationalists used by the Turkish intelligence agencies included Mehmet Ali Ağca (who attempted to assassinate the Pope), Haluk Kırcı, İbrahim Çiftçi, Tugay Maraşlı, Yahya Efe, Oral Çelik, Mehmet Şener, Alaattin Çakıcı, Nurullah Tevfik Ağansoy, Ali Yasak, Abuzer Uğurlu, and Bekir Çelenk. In the 1990s, these people, who maintained contacts among security forces, were involved in various illegal activities (including gambling, drug trafficking, and money laundering) which were uncovered during the 1996 Susurluk scandal.

=== 1990s onwards ===
In 1992, the commander of the ÖHD, General Kemal Yilmaz declared that the special department was still active in the Kurdish–Turkish conflict.

Formations such as the Doğu Çalışma Grubu (1993 alleged Turkish military coup), Batı Çalışma Grubu (1997 military memorandum) and TUSHAD are alleged by various sources to have continued clandestine work in the military and beyond. These groups have broadly aimed to defend Turkey against Islamism and separatism (particularly Kurdish separatism). Still, links with ultra-nationalist-linked mafia groups (Susurluk scandal) have also been seen, and links with Kurdish groups such as Kurdish Hizbollah. These various groups may have links with the Ergenekon organization pursuing a similar agenda in matters such as the 2003 "Sledgehammer" coup plan, but the details are unclear.

In 2008, dozens were indicted and arrested in the Ergenekon investigation for conspiring to oust the Justice and Development Party in 2009.

Ex-special forces soldier Ayhan Çarkın who worked for deep state claimed that deep state was behind the Başbağlar massacre.

== Acknowledgement of its existence ==
The first to publicly point at the existence of an influential, secret coalition, was Prime Minister Bülent Ecevit, who in 1974 revealed the "Counter-Guerrilla". Until then, the United States had been funding the Special Warfare Department (Turkish: Özel Harp Dairesi, or ÖHD) under Joint United States Military Mission for Aid to Turkey (JUSMMAT) program; a Truman Doctrine-based initiative. When annual aid negotiations fell through, the commander of the ÖHD, General Kemal Yamak, asked General Semih Sancar, then the Chief of General Staff to ask Ecevit for a slush fund of 1 million dollars. It was at that point Ecevit learned of its existence, and demanded a briefing. His inquisitiveness and attempt to rein in the organization resulted in an assassination attempt at Izmir airport in 1977. In his memoirs, Yamak said that Ecevit's party itself contained ÖHD operatives, who were selected and educated at a young age by the chief of staff. When Ecevit obliquely asked Yamak about the extent of the party's infiltration Yamak told him not to worry, as the "boys were upright and specially educated ... does that not make them better members of parliament? Besides, have any of them been implicated in a scandal?"

Former President and General Kenan Evren, who led the 1980 military coup related in his memoirs a meeting with the then-Prime Minister Süleyman Demirel on May 5, 1980, stating that Demirel asked him to use the staff of the ÖHD in the fight with the terrorists apparently hinting at the incident in Kizildere village on March 30, 1972. Kenan Evren refused, stating that he would not allow renewed rumours about counter-guerrillas. Kenan Evren made similar remarks in the daily Hürriyet of November 26, 1990. Meanwhile, former Prime Minister Tansu Çiller embraced both "those who died for the state, and those who killed for the state" as heroes.

Former President Süleyman Demirel described the deep state as synonymous with the military, and capable of subordinating the legitimate state in times of turbulence. Kenan Evren himself confirmed the suspicions, in an interview with journalist Yavuz Donat.

In the television show İskele Sancak on Turkish TV channel Kanal 7 on 26 January 2007, then Prime Minister Recep Tayyip Erdoğan stated his acknowledgement of the existence of the deep state:

I don't agree with those who say the deep state does not exist. It does exist. It has always has—and it did not start with the Republic; it dates back to Ottoman times. It's simply a tradition. It must be minimized, and if possible even annihilated.

Some see the Ergenekon investigations, under Erdogan's watch, as the execution of this purge.

== Alleged organizations ==
The following clandestine organizations, some of which may be defunct, are sometimes alleged to be in the deep state:

- Operations Department
- Special Forces Command
- Special Warfare Department
- Tactical Mobilization Group
- Counter-Guerrilla
- Gendarmerie Intelligence and Counterterrorism service (JİTEM)
- Ergenekon
- Turkish Revenge Brigade
- West Working Group
- East Working Group

== Alleged incidents ==
A number of incidents have fueled the discussion on the deep state. Some of them have since been traced to the Counter-Guerrilla, which led a covert war against communism. A few of the rest are:

=== Susurluk scandal ===
The Susurluk scandal developed after a car accident on 3 November 1996 near Susurluk in Balıkesir province. In this accident, former Deputy Chief of Istanbul Police Hüseyin Kocadağ, the leader of the Grey Wolves (Nationalist Action Party's youth organization) Abdullah Çatlı, and a woman named Gonca Us died; DYP Şanlıurfa MP Sedat Bucak, who was also the leader of a large group of village guards in Siverek, was injured. Çatlı was carrying a fake passport under the alias "Mehmet Özbay", the very same alias used by Mehmet Ali Ağca, the assassin who had shot Pope John Paul II. This coalition exposed the connections between the security forces, politicians and organized crime, and led to the resignation of interior minister Mehmet Ağar of the True Path Party.

A parliamentary investigation commission established after the accident published a 350-page report in April 1997. The commission's report maintained that the state organs used the Grey Wolves and that some state forces initiated the right-wing/left-wing armed conflicts in the 1970s in the Republic of Turkey.

Nurullah Tevfik Agansoy, who was the hitman of one of the ülkücü ("idealist") mafia leaders, Alaattin Cakici, had made statements claiming the involvement of Ozal family in the Civangate scandal which led to a war of words between himself and Cakici. The duel was concluded in September this year in Bebek, Istanbul with Agansoy's assassination but the hitman's death only to led more scandalous question marks. Two special protection officers of Deputy Prime Minister Ciller, who were with Agansoy during the incident were also killed in the shooting. Their presence has not been explained.

=== Şemdinli incident ===
On 9 November 2005 a bookstore was bombed in Şemdinli district, Hakkâri Province killing one man and injuring others. The owner of the bookstore spent fifteen years in prison for providing logistical help to the Kurdistan Workers' Party (PKK). This was eighteenth bombing in the province since July. Local people caught the attackers, who turned out to be two non-commissioned army officers and a former PKK militant on the payroll of the Turkish Gendarmerie. The PKK turncoat threw two hand grenades into the bookstore. The incident attracted huge media attention and created a public uproar. In response, the government promised that all individuals responsible for the attack would be identified and punished. The three suspects were later charged, tried and convicted at a civilian court. They each received around 40 years of prison sentences.

The stakes of the legal process suddenly increased when Prosecutor Ferhat Sarıkaya, who prepared the original indictment, alleged that there were connections between high-ranking military officers and suspects Gendarmerie Sergeants Ali Kaya, Özcan İldeniz and Veysel Ateş, the PKK turncoat; however his investigation was cut short. In reaction to this indictment, the High Council of Judges and Prosecutors in the Ministry of Justice dismissed him from the profession. It disqualified him from working as a lawyer. In September 2007, the case was transferred to a military court and the three suspects were released and returned to their official positions. The legal process following the incident showed that lower courts can play a crucial role in holding security forces responsible for human rights violations and provide access to politically weak groups despite the high judiciary's resistance. Yet the government failed to fulfill its initial promises. It did not protect the lower courts that remained under immense pressure from the high judiciary and military command.

=== Assaults on Cumhuriyet and the Council of State ===
In 2006, a secularist judge in the Turkish Council of State was shot dead, and the Istanbul office of the Cumhuriyet newspaper was attacked by grenade. Appearing before court, a president of a chapter of the nationalist Ülkü Ocakları named Alparslan Arslan said he had committed both crimes. Arslan added that the next targets were well-known journalist Mehmet Ali Birand and popular game show host Mehmet Ali Erbil.

Arslan claimed to have planned the assaults himself, however this was cast into doubt in 2007, when a gang allegedly conspiring to overthrow the Islamist-rooted Justice and Development Party was uncovered. A year later, prosecutors indicted 86 high-ranking suspects—and Alparslan Arslan, who was said to be working for the gang. The charges range from firearms possession to running an armed terrorist organization, including both of Arslan's attacks. The bombing of the newspaper was previously thought to be the work of Islamic fundamentalists, but is now described as part of the first stage of Ergenekon's campaign to stoke division and unrest. The group's motives are currently unclear, but it has been said that they sought to sever Turkey's ties with the West; Russian ideologue Aleksandr Dugin described them as "pro-Russian".

=== Hrant Dink assassination ===
Hrant Dink, an ethnic Armenian journalist was killed on 19 January 2007 outside the office of his newspaper Agos. The juvenile killer Ogün Samast was later arrested with the weapon in Samsun. After his arrest, a video clip was released showing him posing with two police officers in front of and holding the Turkish flag. Among the suspects believed to have assisted Ogün Samast was Erhan Tuncel. On 7 February 2007 the Anka news agency reported on the ties of Tuncel to nationalist circles and the fact that he had been working as a police informer and staff member of the Gendarmerie's intelligence service, FETÖ.

== See also ==
- Human rights in Turkey
- Conspiracy theories in Turkey
- Cartel of the Suns
- Deep state in the United States
- Fifth column
- List of assassinated people from Turkey
- Long arm of Ankara
- Siege mentality
- Sledgehammer (coup plan)
