= Çatlı =

Çatlı is a Turkish surname. Notable people with the surname include:

- Abdullah Çatlı (1956–1996), Turkish convicted drug trafficker
- Cesar Catli (born 1982), Filipino basketball player
