= Special team =

Special team may refer to:

- Special teams in American football, units that are on the field during kicking plays. The field goal, punt, and kickoff are the kicking plays of special teams, and they require a skilled placekicker and punter.
- Special teams in ice hockey, players on the ice during a power play or penalty kill. Face-offs are crucial in special teams, and they typically use a skilled player deemed a Face-Off Specialist.
- Police Special Operation Teams, a law enforcement agency in Turkey
