= Akyürek =

Akyürek is a Turkish surname meaning "white heart". Notable people with the surname include:

- Akman Akyürek (1942–1997), Turkish judge
- Engin Akyürek (born 1981), Turkish actor
- Rabia Akyürek (born 1999), Turkish female wheelchair basketball plaýer
- Tahir Akyurek (born 1959), Turkish politician

== See also ==
- Akyürek, Palu
