= Akman Akyürek =

Turkish judge

Akman Akyürek (died 8 December 1997) was a Turkish judge. He was a leading investigator in the Susurluk scandal. The accident in which he died (a rear-end collision with a truck) was curiously similar to both the Susurluk car crash itself, and to the August car crash which killed another Susurluk investigator, Ertugrul Berkman. MPs in parliament said that the incident was suspicious and could be due to a conspiracy. Akyurek had "an archive concerning many illegal and secret cases involving the state". In 2008 Commission member Fikri Sağlar said that the deaths of Akyürek and Bedri İncetahtacı were both "very suspicious", and that he himself had been threatened at the time.
