= Oğuz Yorulmaz =

Oğuz Yorulmaz (- May 2005) was a Turkish policeman convicted of involvement in the Susurluk scandal; he was a bodyguard of Sedat Bucak. He was a member of the Special Operations Department (Turkish: Özel Harekât Dairesi). He was shot in an argument in a bar in May 2005.

After his death, Yorulmaz' mother told the press that he had been involved in over 90 murders for the state, including the assassination of the murderers of Alparslan Pehlivanlı.
