= Söylemez Gang =

Turkish organized crime organization

Söylemez Brothers clan
- Uniformed Gang
- Founding location: Muş
- Years active: 1990–2010
- Territory: Istanbul, Ankara
- Membership: 93
- Leaders: Mehmet Faysal Söylemez; Mustafa Söylemez; Mehmet Sena Söylemez
- Activities: drug smuggling, assassinations, kidnapping
- Rivals: Bucak clan

The Söylemez Gang was an organized crime organization in Turkey headed by Faysal Söylemez and five of his brothers, which was involved in drug smuggling, kidnapping, and murder. Its activities were first revealed in 1996, with the arrest of 25 members. The gang included serving police and military officers. The gang was exposed in June 1996, and gang members were found with large quantities of explosives and rocket launchers.

== Overview ==
The head of the gang was helicopter officer Faysal Söylemez, and among the top officials involved in the gang are the former deputy chief of Istanbul Police, Deniz Gökçetin, and the former head of Istanbul Security branch, Sedat Demir. According to government reports, the Söylemez Gang had arms, explosives, DM 186,500 and TL 155,200,000.

The Soylemez Brothers gang were caught in June 1996 with plans to raid the headquarters of the Bucak clan in Siverek, Urfa. The head of the Bucak clan was the True Path Party (DYP) member of parliament Sedat Bucak, the only survivor of the November 1996 Susurluk car crash. The blood feud between the Bucaks and the Söylemez gang is allegedly based on the control of arms and drugs trafficking in Turkey and particularly in the South East.

In 1997/8 several gang members including Faysal were sentenced to 18–30 years in prison. Two leading members of the gang were arrested in Azerbaijan in 2010, with the assistance of Interpol.
