= Yorulmaz =

Yorulmaz may refer to:

== Places ==
- Yorulmaz, Lice, a neighbourhood in the Lice District of Diyarbakır Province, Turkey

== Surname ==
0 Abdullah Yorulmaz (born 1983), Turkish para archer

- Ahmet Yorulmaz (1932–2014), Turkish journalist, novelist and translator
- Bahtiyar Yorulmaz (born 1955), Turkish former footballer
- Oğuz Yorulmaz (died 2005), convicted Yurkish police officer
- Sevgi Yorulmaz (born 1982), Turkish para archer
