= Yüksekova Gang =

Organized crime group in Turkey

Yuksekova Gang
- Territory: Hakkari Province
- Ethnicity: Turks
- Activities: drug trafficking, arms trafficking

The Yüksekova Gang was an illegal organization in the Yüksekova district of Hakkari Province accused of killing 16 people, with apparent links to the Turkish Gendarmerie's JITEM unit and possible links to the Ergenekon organization. According to Today's Zaman it was "headed by three high-ranking military personnel and various politicians [and] smuggled drugs and weapons."

Its activities were first revealed in 1996, in the aftermath of the Susurluk scandal. Its activities "are only one part of the JİTEM activities" that have been sent to the European Court of Human Rights (ECHR). All of the local court prison sentences concerning the Yüksekova Gang were cancelled by the High Court of Appeals of Turkey, leading the ECHR to fine Turkey 103,000 Euro for its decisions about the Yüksekova Gang. The mayor of Yüksekova, Ali Ihsan Zeydan, was arrested in 1997.

== Cases ==
- ECHR, YURTSEVEN AND OTHERS v. TURKEY (Application no. 31730/96), 18 December 2003. Relates to the abduction of three people from the village of Ağaçlı on 27 October 1995, by soldiers belonging to the Yüksekova Commando Battalion under the command of Major Mehmet Emin Yurdakul. Yurdakul and two others were acquitted by a Hakkari court in 1999, and the acquittal was upheld by the Yargıtay court of appeal on 2 April 2001.
