= Bedri İncetahtacı =

Turkish politician (1960–1999)

Mehmet Bedri İncetahtacı (1960 – 21 November 1999) was a Turkish politician, best known as a member of the parliamentary commission which investigated the 1996 Susurluk scandal. He was a member of the Grand National Assembly of Turkey for the Welfare Party (RP) and, after it was banned, its Virtue Party (FP) successor, and a leading member of Millî Görüş, sometimes known as "Hoca's prince" (Hoca, Necmettin Erbakan).

İncetahtacı died in a car accident in November 1999, on his way to the airport to speak about Susurluk at conferences in Germany. His son said in 2008 that he thought his father had been assassinated. Fellow Susurluk Commission members Mehmet Elkatmış and Fikri Sağlar had also voiced suspicions. Yeni Şafak reported that a week before his death İncetahtacı had gained access to new documents on the relationship between businessman Erol Evcil and certain civil servants. His family said he had been writing a book about Susurluk.

== See also ==
- List of members of the Grand National Assembly of Turkey who died in office
