= Veli Küçük =

Turkish general (born 1944)

- Born: May 9, 1944 (age 82); Türkmen, Gölpazarı
- Spouse: Necla Küçük (died 2017)
- Children: 2 (1 dead)
- Military career
- Allegiance: Turkey
- Branch: Gendarmerie General Command
- Service years: 1965–2000
- Rank: Brigadier general

Veli Küçük (born 9 May 1944) is a retired Turkish brigadier-general. He is thought to be the founder of the JİTEM intelligence arm of the Turkish Gendarmerie, and is accused by the Turkish government of being the head of the Ergenekon organization, based on testimony by Tuncay Güney. He was arrested in January 2008, and on 5 August 2013, sentenced to two consecutive life sentences. Later, in 2019, those sentences were overturned.

== Career ==
Küçük graduated from the Turkish Military Academy in 1965. He was promoted to Brigadier-General in 1996, and retired on 30 August 2000.

Küçük is thought to be the founder of the JİTEM intelligence arm of the Turkish Gendarmerie.

== Susurluk ==
Küçük is said to be the last person to have spoken to Abdullah Çatlı before his death in the 1996 Susurluk car crash, and to have communicated extensively with Çatlı, Drej Ali and Sami Hoştan.

== Ergenekon ==
Küçük was accused by the Turkish judiciary of being the head of the Ergenekon organisation, based on testimony by Tuncay Güney. He was arrested in January 2008. Cem Ersever's archive was found in Küçük's house.

At first, Küçük is said to have close links with Alparslan Arslan, the shooter in the 2006 Turkish Council of State shooting based on a photograph in Sweden. Later on, it turned out that the man next to Küçük was not Arslan, but an Azerbaijani citizen named Mehmed Mehmedov. Moreover, Arslan said that he never went to Sweden and his father confirmed it.

During the Ergenekon trials both Muzaffer Tekin and Oktay Yıldırım kissed Küçük's hand in court, as a traditional sign of respect.

On 5 August 2013 he was sentenced to two consecutive life sentences with another 99 years.

He was released on 11 March 2014 by the 4th High Criminal Court. On 21 April 2016, the 16th Criminal Chamber of the Court of Cassation overturned the decision of the Istanbul 13th High Criminal Court. The Court of Cassation cited inconsistencies in the evidence used during the trials, illegal wiretaps, and stated that the army chief of staff İlker Başbuğ wasn't tried in the right court.
