= Rovshan Javadov =

Azerbaijani military officer

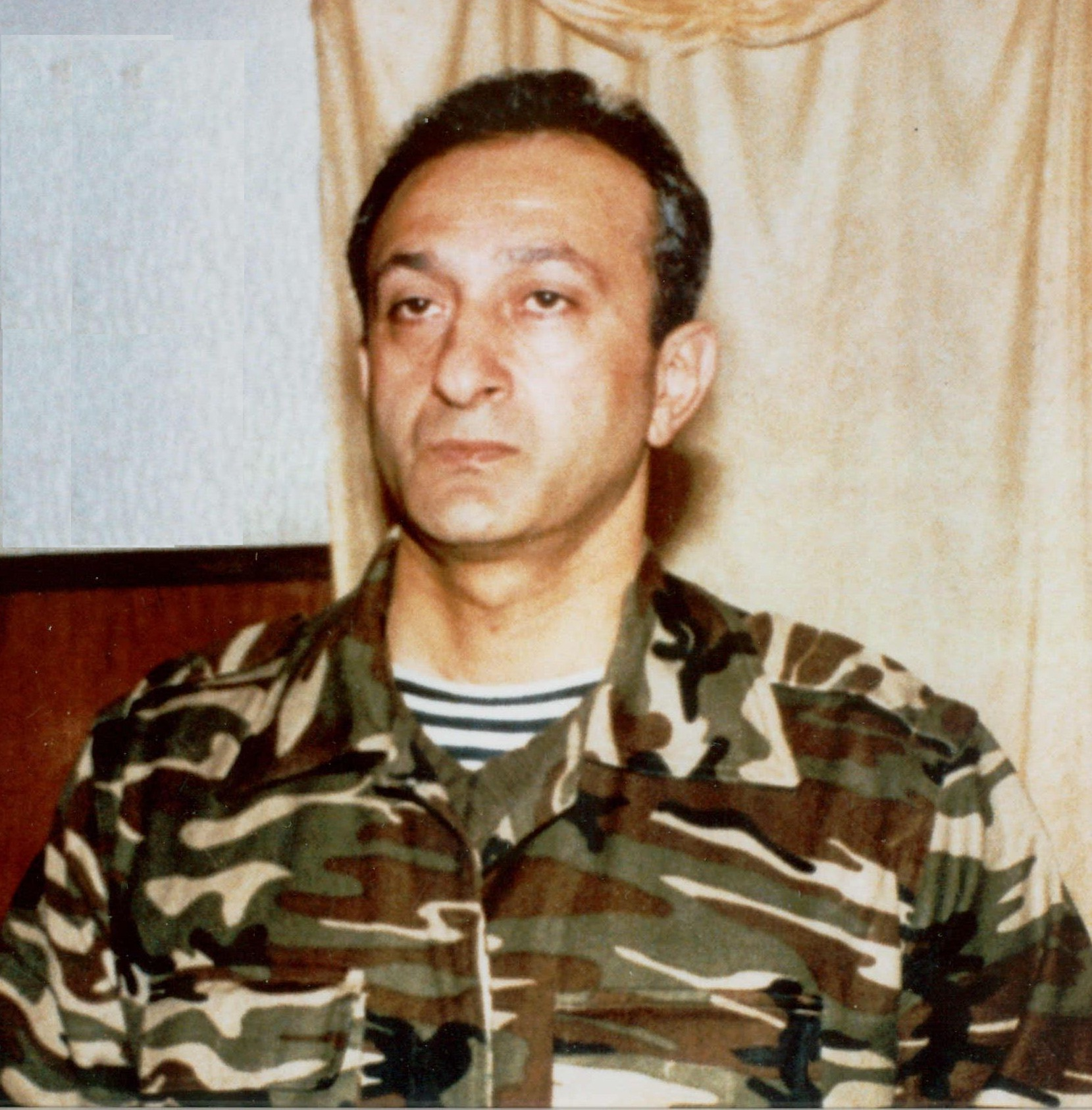
- Rovshan Javadov at his hq
- Born: Rövşən Bəxtiyar oğlu Cavadov; October 19, 1951; Lachin, Azerbaijan SSR, USSR
- Died: March 17, 1995 (aged 43) Baku, Azerbaijan
- Allegiance: Azerbaijan
- Service years: 1973–1992
- Rank: Colonel
- Conflicts: First Afghan Civil War; First Nagorno-Karabakh War; 1995 Azerbaijani coup attempt †

Rovshan Bakhtiyar oghlu Javadov (Azerbaijani: Rövşən Bəxtiyar oğlu Cavadov, 19 October 1951 – March 17, 1995) was an officer in the Azerbaijani Armed Forces and the chief of the Special Purpose Police Detachment of Azerbaijan (OPON).

Born in what was then part of the Soviet Union, he took on an early role in the early years of the newly independent Azerbaijan, becoming the leader of OPON, a military police unit of a few thousand people. The creation of the organization would lead to clashes with President Heydar Aliyev. In 1995, this conflict with Aliyev would eventually culminate in an attempted coup against Aliyev, which would fail and lead to a siege of OPON headquarters. During the siege, Javadov was shot and eventually died of his wounds.

== Early life ==
Rovshan Javadov was born on 19 October 1951 in Lachin. In 1973, he graduated from Azerbaijan State Medical University. In 1973-1976 he worked as a surgeon in the Interior Ministry Hospital of Azerbaijan SSR. In 1976, Rovshan Javadov entered the USSR Interior Ministry Military Academy in Rostov from which he graduated in 1980.

== Early political career ==
After completing his military education in 1980, he volunteered for service in Afghanistan.

In 1982 Rovshan Javadov became the police inspector of Ganja. In 1987, Rovshan Javadov, organized the underground Takamul ("Evolution") Party in the NKAO and Ganja with his brother Mahir Javadov.

In 1989, the Takamul Party established military units that were composed of Azerbaijanis as well as of Rovshan's karate students. In January 1990, Soviet troops took control of Azerbaijan and fighting broke out in Baku and other cities between the Popular Front of Azerbaijan activists whom Rovshan Javadov helped train, and Soviet troops. The Soviets quickly took over Baku. Javadov planned to withdraw to Ganja with his supporters and proclaim Ganja a capital city and resume fighting the occupation. However, Soviet troops withdrew by mid-March.

== Beginning of professional military career ==
Due to the escalating situation in Nagorno-Karabakh, in 1990 the Takamul party had turned into an official military organization known as HTPD or more popularly, by its Russian acronym OMON. It was later renamed the OPON (Special Purpose Police Unit). That same year Rovshan Javadov became Supreme Commander of OPON and rose to the rank of colonel the Azerbaijani Armed Forces. Due to successful operations in Nagorno-Karabakh led by OPON forces against Russian and local Armenian forces, the provisional government in 1991 proclaimed OPON members National Heroes.

In 1993, Javadov was appointed Deputy Minister of the Interior in the Popular Front government and was elected as a Chairman of the Azerbaijan Youth Movement. As the fighting was escalating in Nagorno-Karabakh, Javadov traveled to Afghanistan in 1993 and returned with 1,300 experienced Afghan mujahideen.

In 1993, after personally regrouping most of the Interior Ministry forces and OPON forces, he launched the most successful military assault on Armenians from Artsakh in Askeran. Simultaneously he organized the military offensive in Fizuli which was halted after two weeks when the Popular Front government was overthrown by Colonel Suret Huseynov.

== Political career ==
After the overthrow of President Abulfaz Elchibey who led the People Front government, Suret Huseynov and Javadov welcomed the return of KGB General Heydar Aliyev to Baku. Huseynov and Javadov supported Aliyev in the 1993 presidential elections, and he was victorious. In the summer of 1993, Suret Huseynov's Ganja Brigade seized 10 villages from Armenians in the Karabakh zone. After this operation, Huseynov was officially proclaimed a National Hero and appointed a Prime Minister of Azerbaijan. The same year Javadov was offered the medal of a national hero, but he refused to accept it until Azerbaijan would fully occupy Nagorno-Karabakh and the independence of an Azerbaijan Republic was fully secure.

Huseynov and Javadov began to purchase arms for the Azerbaijani Armed Forces and restarted the Fizuli offensive in January 1994. Three weeks later, the Fizuli offensive was halted by Heydar Aliyev as he secretly agreed to hidden negotiations with Russian and Armenian officials to solidify his grip on power in Azerbaijan. The result of Aliev's negotiations came to be known to the public as the Bishkek Protocol in May 1994.

== Political rebellion ==
Rovshan Javadov and Suret Husseynov publicly opposed the Bishkek deal and threatened to start military operations if Russian troops were to come to Azerbaijan as called for in the treaty. The political outrage caused by the potential return of Russian troops to Azerbaijan forced Heydar Aliev and Boris Yeltsin to amend that part of the treaty. In June 1994, Javadov announced his aim to run for the November 1995 parliamentary elections, in which he would represent the opposition block to the authoritarian rule of Heydar Aliyev. In August 1994, he announced a plan to impeach Heydar Aliyev once he won the elections to the parliament.

== October 1994 events ==
After Javadov proclaimed his opposition towards Heydar Aliyev's rule, Javadov became the main target of Aliyev's system.

On 30 September 1994, Deputy Chairman of Parliament Affiadin Jalilov and Chief of Military Intelligence Shamsi Rahimov were assassinated next to their place of residence.

On 1 October the older brother of Rovshan Javadov, District Attorney Mahir Javadov, was accused of ordering the assassination and three OPON members were arrested without any evidence. One was the personal bodyguard and a driver of Mahir Javadov, an officer of OPON Elchin Aliyev. Mahir Javadov publicly challenged the charges against him and called for an objective investigation and an immediate release of the OPON members.

The day after Mahir Javadov's statements he was invited by Chief Attorney Ali Omarov to the headquarters of the Attorney General's office to explain what had happened. At the Attorney General's office, a secret and illegal attempt was made by presidential guards to arrest Javadov. Mahir Javadov resisted the arrest and with eight members of his security personnel from OPON quickly disarmed the forty-five presidential guards. Javadov arrested Omarov and others who were executing the illegal arrest warrant apparently issued by Aliyev. As soon as the news of the events spread, most of the National Army rebelled and OPON fighters seized most government buildings and openly challenged the authoritarian rule of Aliyev. Aliyev was forced to back down and blamed Prime Minister Suret Husseynov for causing chaos in the country. After two days of negotiations, Aliyev convinced Javadov that he had nothing to do with the arrest of the OPON members. To avoid civil war, Javadov agreed to peace and released all captured members of Aliev's militia.

After October 1994, Mahir Javadov was forced to resign as an attorney and was elected as a Chairman of the Independent Traders Union of Azerbaijan. Two of the three OPON members were immediately released from illegal detention. Suret Husseynov was also forced to resign and after an attempt to kill him he escaped to Russia where he was hiding until 1997. He was later arrested and extradited to Azerbaijan where he spent six years in prison.

== March 1995 events ==
On 13 March 1995, metal products worth a substantial amount of money belonging to one of the companies which was a member of Independent Traders Union of Azerbaijan were illegally seized by the members of Azerbaijani Secret Service loyal to Heydar Aliyev in Gazakh and Agstafa regions of Azerbaijan. OPON members were accused of involvement in illegal cross-border trafficking even though the goods were seized within the territory of Azerbaijan. Presidential Guard members attacked OPON bases in Agstafa and Gazakh. They were quickly decimated and their commanders captured by OPON forces which were led by regional OPON commander Elchin Amiraslanov. The same afternoon Aliyev contacted Javadov and asked him to travel to Gazakh to settle the dispute. Aliyev accused Javadov of the unconstitutional action of "hijacking" the role of the Commander in Chief which is reserved for the President of the country.

Javadov ordered Elchin Amiraslanov to release all Presidential Guard captives. Javadov immediately returned to Baku to organize OPON reinforcements along the front lines. Upon his arrival in Baku he went straight to OPON headquarters and held a meeting of the OPON Command Council. During the meeting, the OPON base was surrounded by Presidential Guards. Aliyev accused Rovshan and Mahir Javadov of plotting a coup d'état and sent the pro-Aliyev militia to attack Javadov's residence in Baku under the command of Maharam Aliyev. The security personnel of Mahir Javadov, along with twenty OPON fighters who were in the area, counterattacked and blocked Maheram Aliyev inside a school which was used as an operational headquarters by the pro-Aliyev militia. On the early morning of 14 March, Rovshan Javadov ordered Mahir Javadov to come to OPON headquarters on the outskirts of Baku. As Mahir Javadov arrived at OPON headquarters, the pro-Aliyev militia under the command of Rovshan Akperov, Najmedin Sadiqov and Madat Guliyev attacked OPON headquarters. After a 24-hour gun battle, the militia had still not taken the base so they began a siege. Rovshan Javadov tried to use diplomatic means to end the bloodshed and prevent a civil war. Javadov agreed to the negotiations set up by the President of Turkey, Suleiman Demirel, to meet Heydar Aliyev at 8:00 am on 17 March and end the dispute peacefully.

On his way to meet Aliyev, Javadov was wounded by the pro-Aliyev militia and was taken to the Interior Ministry Hospital by his security personnel. Upon his arrival at the hospital, Presidential Guards arrested all five OPON soldiers guarding Javadov and prevented the doctors from giving medical aid to him. Javadov died of his wounds the same day.

His brother, Mahir Javadov, escaped to Austria where he was given political asylum in 1996. In 1998 Mahir Javadov moved to Iran where he remained until January 2003. Rovshan Janadov's nephew lives in the United Arab Emirates.
