= Sami Hoştan =

Turkish suspected criminal (1947–2015)

- Born: 1 July 1947; Skopje, North Macedonia
- Died: 11 May 2015 (aged 67); Istanbul, Turkey
- Occupation: Mafia Boss

Sami Hoştan (1 July 1947 – 11 May 2015), also known as Arnavut Sami Sami the Albanian, was a Turkish suspect in the Ergenekon trials. He was a former partner of casino king Ömer Lütfü Topal; he was acquitted of Topal's murder in 2001. He was a friend of Abdullah Çatlı's; he was one of the first to arrive to collect Çatlı's body from the scene of the 1996 Susurluk car crash. He was arrested as part of the Ergenekon investigation in January 2008.
