= Ali Yasak =

Turkish criminal (born 1956)

- Born: 1956 (age 69–70); Şanlıurfa, Turkey
- Occupation: Mafia Boss
- Children: Halil Yasak

Ali Yasak (born 1956), better known as Drej Ali (literally: Ali, the tall) is one of Turkey's most renowned criminals. He was involved in the Susurluk scandal.

On December 19, 1977, he was elected a board member of the Urfa Branch of the Idealists’ Union (ÜOD) (Grey Wolves). In 1978, he became chairman of the students association of Urfa Education Institute.

On January 12, 1978, he was arrested for participating in an illegal demonstration, and was released on court's order on January 25, 1978, to be prosecuted without arrest. On January 26, 1978, he was wounded in an armed clash with opposing groups.

Since 1990, due to his ties with the organized crime, he was involved in the activity of collecting money for checks and vouchers in Istanbul. Besides, he had correspondence with fugitives and wanted ultra-nationalist activists abroad.

On 26 May 2008, Yasak was sentenced to fourteen years in prison for leading a criminal organization, and attempted murder.

On 5 August 2013 Yasak was sentenced to six years and three months as part of the Ergenekon trials.

== Sources ==
- "1998 Report". Human Rights Foundation of Turkey. Archived from the original on 2010-09-02. (contains the Susurluk reports in English)
