= Süleyman Genç =

Turkish politician and author (1944–2022)

Süleyman Genç (1944–2022) was a Turkish politician and author. He was a leading figure of the Turkish left youth movement in the 1960s, and a member of the Grand National Assembly of Turkey for the Republican People's Party (CHP) from 1973 to 1980.

He was born in Gölyayla, İkizdere. He died in Bursa on 3 November 2022.

== Books ==
Some of his books include:

- Oniki Martá nasil gelindi (1971) — 1971 Turkish coup d'état
- Bıçağın sırtındaki Türkiye: CIA-MİT kontr-gerilla (1978) — Counter-Guerrilla
- (with Mehmet Saadettin Aygen, Süleyman Bozok) Afyonkarahisar masalları (1983)
- (with Emin Tanrıvermiş) Geniş açıklama ve muhasebe örnekleri ile Katma Değer Vergisi Kanunu (1985)
- Kuşatılan devlet, Türkiye (1997)
