= Mehmet Elkatmış =

Turkish politician (born 1947)

Mehmet Elkatmış (born 14 January 1947, Nevşehir) is a Justice and Development Party (AKP) politician. He was chair of the parliamentary Susurluk Commission which investigated the 1996 Susurluk scandal. He was chair of the parliamentary Human Rights Commission in 2005. He was first elected to parliament in 1991.
