= Susurluk car crash =

1996 event in Turkey which led to a scandal

- Date: 3 November 1996
- Location: Susurluk, Balıkesir Province, Turkey
- Outcome: Abdullah Çatlı, Huseyin Kocadağ, and Gonca Us dead; Sedat Bucak injured; leads to Susurluk scandal

The Susurluk car crash was a car crash that took place on 3 November 1996 in the small town of Susurluk, in Turkey's Balıkesir Province. It resulted in the deaths of three of the passengers: Abdullah Çatlı, a former ultra-rightist militant wanted by police for multiple murders and drug trafficking; Huseyin Kocadağ, a senior police official; and beauty queen and Çatlı's girlfriend Gonca Us. Sedat Bucak, an MP, suffered a broken leg and fractured skull but survived the accident. The Susurluk crash was a key event in the unravelling of the deep state in Turkey. The peculiar associations of the crash victims and their links with Interior Minister Mehmet Ağar led to a number of investigations, including a parliamentary investigation, of what became known as the Susurluk scandal.

== Background ==
Prior to the crash, all the victims, plus Interior Minister Mehmet Ağar, had been staying at the Onura Hotel in Kuşadası. The assassination plan called for Ağar to be killed too. However, he was warned by Sami Hoştan, so he remained at the hotel and told the rest to leave without him.

Former MHP deputy Kubilay Uygun said that he was introduced to Abdullah Çatlı and Hüseyin Kocadağ three days before the accident by a since-retired lieutenant general. Uygun says that he too has worked for the "deep state". Sedat Bucak, a Kurdish chieftain and Village Guard, was also among them.

The Prosecutor's Report said that the passengers in the car were on their way to stage an assassination.

== Event ==
A Mercedes 600 SEL owned by Bucak crashed into a truck near Çatalceviz, Susurluk in the Balıkesir province in Turkey. The crash took place on 3 November 1996 at around 19:25 TR&. The car was travelling at nearly 180 km/h (110 mph; 50 m/s).

Abdullah Çatlı, a former ultra-rightist militant wanted by police for multiple murders and drug trafficking; Huseyin Kocadağ, a senior police official; and Gonca Us (Çatlı's girlfriend) were killed in the crash. Bucak escaped with a broken leg and fractured skull.

== Alleged assassination ==
According to an anonymous witness in the 2007 Ergenekon investigation, everyone initially survived the crash, which was precipitated by remotely disabling the brakes of the Mercedes. A three-person team came and snapped the necks of Us and Çatlı. Bucak was rescued by his guards, who also took his bag from the boot (trunk) and called Grey Wolf Haluk Kırcı. One of the first people to visit the site was mafia king Ali Yasak, better known as "Drej Ali", who took Çatlı's bag from the car, according to Tuncay Güney. Veli Küçük refutes Güney's allegation that Yasak acted on his orders. A prosecutor from Ilgin made similar allegations during 2008.

Alleged drug baron Sami Hoştan said that Bucak's guards were Ercan Ersoy and Ali Fevzi Bir (a.k.a. "Aliço"). The guards called Hoştan, who then called Bucak's friend Abdülgani Gızılkaya, and Veli Küçük, allegedly because the accident occurred in his Gendarmerie's precinct. (Note: In Turkey, the Gendarmerie in responsible for policing inter-city areas; 92% of the country.) Driving to the scene of the accident, Hoştan saw Drej Ali. Hoştan said that Mehmet Eymür called while he, Çatlı, and Bucak were driving together, before the accident. Eymür asked Çatlı about the murder of MİT spy Tarık Ümit. Eymür reportedly told Ümit's daughter, Hande Birinci, that her father worked with Korkut Eken (an adviser to Ağar) on the side and that he was assassinated by Ağar's men after he became disgusted by their corruption.

== Evidence ==
Evidence seized at the crash site indicated that Çatlı had been carrying:

- diplomatic credentials, given by the Turkish authorities
- a government-approved weapons permit.
- a fake passport in the name of Mehmet Özbay; the same alias used by Mehmet Ali Ağca.
- numerous 9mm Beretta and Saddam (Beretta 92) pistols, one .22 caliber Beretta with a silencer, and two Heckler & Koch MP5 submachine guns.
- two listening devices.
- a cache of narcotics.
- thousands of U.S. dollars.

== Aftermath ==
The truck driver, Hasan Gökçe, was held responsible for the accident and sentenced to three years in jail. He was bailed for 6.42 million TL. His truck (a 1968 Ford) was foreclosed after he failed to pay his taxes.

The revelation of the connections between the victims led to multiple investigations of what became known as the Susurluk scandal.

== Bibliography ==
- "1998 Report" (PDF). Ankara: Human Rights Foundation of Turkey. 2000. Archived from the original (PDF) on 5 February 2009. (contains the Susurluk reports in the annex, and material on the Counter-Guerrilla) (in English)
