= Nurullah Tevfik Ağansoy =

Turkish mob boss

Nurullah Tevfik Ağansoy (1960, Topcular, Istanbul – August 28, 1996, Bebek, Istanbul) was a Turkish mob boss and former Grey Wolves member who was involved in the Susurluk scandal. After the 1980 Turkish coup, he was arrested and sentenced to 16 years in prison for his role in shootings, bombings, and a murder. In 1986, he was charged with a further five murders and began cooperating with Turkish intelligence. He was released in 1989. He was assassinated on the orders of his former business partner Alaattin Çakıcı.

== Background ==
His parents were Yaşar and Ayşe.

Ağansoy was a member of the Çağlayan, Kağıthane branch of the Nationalist Movement Party in the 1970s, and knew Alaattin Çakıcı as a leader of a neighbouring branch.

== Imprisonment ==
Prior to 1980 Turkish coup d'etat, he was arrested by the Military Court No. 1 on May 20, 1979 on allegations of his involvement in killing and wounding persons and various bombings in Şişli and Gültepe in İstanbul. However, the court decided to release him pending trial, and he was acquitted subsequently.

He was arrested on July 10, 1981, as one of the persons involved in the killing of Zafer Ereske in 1980. He was convicted on January 29, 1981, for planting bombs and carrying a gun without license.

During the period he served in Metris Prison in Istanbul, he handed in a petition on April 24, 1988, requesting to benefit from the Repentance Law.

== Release ==
He was released in 1989, and began working together with Çakıcı. He fell out with Çakıcı over the shooting of Engin Civan, as his name became associated with the shooting (Civangate) and he had to flee abroad. He was captured in Germany with the assistance of Interpol. At his trial Uğur Kılıç, Çakıcı's wife and the daughter of Dündar Kılıç, was due to testify, but Çakıcı had her murdered first. Ağansoy declared he would get revenge for this murder, whereupon Çakıcı announced that Ağansoy would be dead within two months. An attempt to assassinate Ağansoy at the April 3, 1996, court hearing at which he was released was narrowly foiled.

== Assassination ==
On August 28, 1996, while he was sitting in a cafe in the Bebek neighborhood of Istanbul with Celal Babür and Ferda Temel (the police officers in charge of protecting Prime Minister Tansu Çiller), he was targeted by assassins arriving by car. Ağansoy was shot dead along with Babür in an attack carried out by hitmen hired by Alaattin Çakıcı. The cafe's owner, Gulcin Balaban, was also killed; cafe customers, including some notable figures such as Sibel Can and Cem Özer, were able to escape, although some were injured. The shootout lasted for 20 minutes and despite taking place just 200 metres from the local police station, no police intervened until the end of the shootout, and the attackers were not pursued.

He was buried in Zincirlikuyu Cemetery, with his wife Hülya avowing revenge. His wife has died of cancer on February 27, 2020.
