= Behçet Cantürk =

Turkish mob boss (1950–1994)

- Born: 1950; Lice, Diyarbakır, Turkey
- Died: 14 January 1994 (aged 43–44); Sapanca, Turkey
- Occupations: Drug trafficker and arms trafficker

Behçet Cantürk (1950 – 14 January 1994) was a Turkish drug trafficker.

== 1970s ==
Behçet's mother, Hatun Demirciyan, was an Armenian from Lice district. His father was named Reşit.

Starting in 1975, Cantürk became a partner of some smugglers by providing money for them. In 1975, he participated in organizing the protest rally in Lice, Diyarbakır held by the Progressive Youth Association (İGD) and financially supported the rally.

In the same year, he received a medical report through bribes from Konya Military Hospital certifying that he was not suitable for military service.

In 1977 he started arms trafficking.

== 1980s ==
Between 1981 and 1983, he was involved in the smuggling of gold and diamonds with the help of jewelers of Armenian and Syriac origin in the Grand Bazaar of İstanbul. In 1983, when Dündar Kılıç and İsmail Hacısüleymanoğlu started to put pressure on the non-Muslim and Diyarbakır-born jewelers in the Grand Bazaar in order to take control of gold and diamonds smuggling, he organized the bombing and an armed attack carried out by ASALA in the Grand Bazaar.

As of 1983, he was controlling the heroin market in Diyarbakır and sale of heroin abroad.

On June 22, 1984, he was arrested by the Military Court in Ankara for membership of the Kurdistan Workers Party and the Kurdistan Avantguard Workers Party.

== 1990s ==
He and Hüseyin Baybaşin were partners in the smuggling of 3 tons of drugs on the ship MV Kısmetim 1 that sunk in the Mediterranean end of December 1992.

In April 1992, along with a person named Iranian Hüsno, he brought six tons of morphine base and five tons of marijuana from Pakistan. While distributing the drugs, he chose smugglers, who supported the PKK financially.

On various dates, he collected money in the name of the PKK from drug smugglers named Savaş Buldan, Hüseyin Erez, Hasan Erez, Cahit Kocakaya and Eyüp Kocakaya. But it was later announced that he only paid money to PKK and PKK had no relation to any drug deals. After the Ergenekon trials, some information was revealed that the Tansu Çiller government had supplied Canturk with a military helicopter to move drugs from East Turkey to West Turkey.

He was abducted by Turkish mobsters dressed like police on 14 January 1994, and his corpse was found the next day in the vicinity of Sapanca.

== See also ==
- Susurluk scandal
