= Ömer Lütfü Topal =

Turkish drug trafficker (1942–1996)

- Born: 1942; Doğanşehir, Malatya Province, Turkey
- Died: July 28, 1996 (aged 53–54); Istanbul, Turkey
- Cause of death: Gunned down
- Occupations: Casino owner, drug trafficker, money launderer
- Children: Serdar Murat Topal
- Allegiance: Susurluk scandal
- Convictions: 1962, 1969 and 1971 in Turkey for organized crime; 1978–1981 in Belgium for drug trafficking; 1981–1986 in the United States for drug trafficking

Ömer Lütfü Topal, sometimes spelled Lütfi (1942 – July 28, 1996), was a Turkish businessman, who was deeply involved in the Susurluk scandal. He had convictions for drug smuggling, and was dubbed the "casino king" for the gambling ventures that made his later fortune, which amounted to around $1 billion at the time of his assassination.

== Background ==
He was born in Doğanşehir, Malatya Province to Mahmut Topal.

== Life ==
He has a criminal record at the İstanbul Police for the years 1962, 1969 and 1971 for threatening people and forcing them to sign debt bills, stabbing, injury, beating and murder.

=== Drug smuggling ===
According to Belgian newspapers, he was arrested on June 20, 1978, in Antwerp province of Belgium while carrying 6 kilos of heroin. A fake passport was found on him on the name of Sadık Sami Onar, issued by the Gaziantep Police. Besides, he was accused of drug transfer to the United States over Belgium. He was imprisoned in Belgium between June 14, 1978, and July 23, 1981. Then, he was extradited to the US in order to serve a sentence passed on him for heroin trafficking. He was prosecuted in New York and sentenced to five years in prison.

His name was mentioned in testimonies of persons, who had been apprehended between January 13 and February 20, 1981, in the Netherlands with vast amounts of heroin.

Topal was captured by officers of the Istanbul Narcotics Branch on May 5, 1989, in connection with the aforementioned incident, but released by the İstanbul SSC Prosecution Office.

=== Casino empire ===
At the time of his death Topal owned casinos scattered throughout the country, (Note: Adana Seyhan, Istanbul Polat Rönesance and Akgün Hotel, Antalya Ofo, Hotel Saray, Hotel Grand Kaptan, Mersin Hilton, Muğla Aries Hotel, and Aydın Onur Hotel)oversaw an illicit enterprise that involved 450 people, and had 200 famous customers. According to his tax statement, he registered a loss of 6 billion Turkish Lira in 1993 ($546,493), however an investigation revealed that he had actually made a profit of 473 billion lira ($39m). An extensive 1999 study by the Ministry of Finance contained the following facts on Topal:

- He shot from rags to riches in just five years; in 1991 he owned but a cafeteria.
- He had withdrawn 4.1 trillion Lira from gamblers' credit cards.
- In sum, 14.5 trillion TL, US$98 million, and 23 million DM were deposited into his 137 bank accounts.
- A significant number of his 452 properties were acquired as payment for gambling debts.
- A significant source of gambling revenue was poker, raising ~$750m between 1994 and 1996.

Topal was also accorded lengthy coverage in the Inspection Board report. Its author, Kutlu Savaş, wrote that Topal would have become a drug lord that posed a threat to the government if unstopped. In 1995, he made certain attempts to take over the management of some hotels and casinos in Ashgabat in Turkmenistan.

According to some information, he had dealt with drugs at the Emperyal Casino he owned in Istanbul, and that he had bribed certain members of the security organization in foreign currency.

== Death ==
Topal was gunned down on July 28, 1996, with a Kalashnikov rifle. Some say this was the beginning of the Susurluk scandal. Abdullah Çatlı's fingerprint was allegedly found on the drum of one of the machine guns used. Ayhan Çarkın and two other policemen were acquitted for lack of evidence; in 2008 the trial judge claimed this was due to a sabotage of the investigation.

He left behind 100 trillion lira (on the order of a billion USD). Twenty two of his companies were passed onto his son Murat Topal, daughter Elif Topal, and first wife Safiye Belli. His second wife, Birsu Hilal Altıntaş, inherited a few cars, companies, and properties too. After his death, his casinos were run by Ömer Gultekin.
