= Susurluk scandal =

1996 political scandal in Turkey

- Native name: Susurluk skandalı
- Date: November 3, 1996
- Time: 19.25 (TRT, UTC+03:00)
- Location: Çatalceviz, Susurluk, Turkey
- Type: Political scandal
- Cause: Close relationship between the deep state in Turkey, the Grey Wolves, and the Turkish mafia
- Outcome: Resignations of Mehmet Ağar and Tansu Çiller
- Deaths: 3
- Injuries: 1
- Convicted: None

The Susurluk scandal (Turkish: Susurluk skandalı) or Susurluk accident (Turkish: Susurluk kazası), was a 1996 political scandal in Turkey that exposed a close relationship between the Turkish government, the ultra-nationalistic paramilitary Grey Wolves organization and the Turkish mafia. It took place during the peak of the Kurdish–Turkish conflict in the mid-1990s.

The scandal surfaced with a car–truck collision on November 3, 1996, near the small town of Susurluk in the province of Balıkesir. The victims included Hüseyin Kocadağ, the deputy chief of the Istanbul Police Department, Sedat Bucak, a Member of Parliament representing Şanlıurfa Province, and Abdullah Çatlı, the leader of the Grey Wolves and a contract killer for the National Intelligence Organization (Turkey) (MİT), who was on Interpol's red list at the time of his death. The peculiar connections of those involved in the crash with Interior Minister Mehmet Ağar brought to light the existence of a deep state in Turkey and an internal power struggle within the Turkish political structure.

The infighting had its roots in the state's escalating low-intensity conflict with the Kurdistan Workers' Party (PKK) that had been taking place since 1984. Towards the end of 1992, a furious debate in the National Security Council (NSC) about how to proceed was taking place. The same year, the NSC ordered a coordinated black operations campaign against the PKK using special forces. The Turkish branch of Operation Gladio, the "Counter-Guerrilla", contributed much of these special forces.

Deputy Prime Minister Tansu Çiller tasked the police force, under the leadership of then-chief of police Mehmet Ağar, with crippling the PKK and assassinating its leader, Abdullah Öcalan. The police unit responsible for this job was the Special Operations Department (Turkish: Özel Harekat Dairesi, ÖHD). Abdullah Çatlı also took part. This caused consternation in the MİT, which had formerly counted on Çatlı to undertake reprisals against the militant Armenian organization ASALA. Especially concerned was Mehmet Eymür of the MİT's Operations/Counter-Terrorism Department, who had irreconcilable differences with Ağar. Those involved then split into two camps - those loyal to Mehmet Ağar and those loyal to Mehmet Eymür. The scandal has hence been pithily described as "the battle of the two Mehmets".

Intelligence expert Mahir Kaynak described the police camp as "pro-European", and the MİT camp as "pro-American". According to Kaynak, Ağar's gang aimed to create a state within a state, complete with a shadow army (the village guard system), and intelligence organization, inside the police force. The MİT ultimately purged the gang in a crash that was passed off as an accident. The subsequent media scrutiny surrounding the crash led to several investigations and the resignation of both Çiller and Ağar, though no government official associated with the scandal faced any immediate criminal trial.

== People involved ==
- Mehmet Ağar, Interior Minister, police chief until March 1995.
- Tanju Akça, Diamond kingpin.
- Sedat Bucak, DYP Şanlıurfa MP, chieftain of a 20,000-strong village guard clan in Siverek.
- Abdullah Çatlı, leader of the ultranationalist Grey Wolves, contract killer for the Counter-Guerrilla.
- Ayhan Çarkın, prominent member of the Police Special Operation Teams Department (Turkish: Özel Harekât, ÖHD).
- Tansu Çiller, deputy prime minister, chairman of the DYP.
- Korkut Eken, expert on special warfare. Affiliations with both the MİT and the ÖHD. Recruited Kurdish militias to fight the PKK in the early 1990s.
- Lazım Esmaeili and Askar Simitko. Iranian SAVAMA agents.
- Mehmet Eymür, head of the MİT's Counter-Terrorism department.
- Doğan Güreş, Chief of the General Staff (December 1990 – August 1994)
- Hüseyin Kocadağ, head of the Istanbul police school. Former deputy chief of the Istanbul police. Former head of the Special Operations Department.
- Teoman Koman, commander of the Turkish Gendarmerie (which JİTEM operates under) 1995–1997.
- Sönmez Köksal, undersecretary of the MİT.
- İbrahim Şahin, deputy chief of the ÖHD.
- Gonca Us, Abdullah Çatlı's lover; former beauty queen.

Of the 59 people named in the third MİT report, 17 were dead by the time the report was published. Among them are 4 politicians, 4 businessmen, 14 mafia-connected nationalists, 5 military personnel, 13 security personnel, 4 MİT personnel, and 8 mafia-connected drug smugglers.

== Background ==
=== Kurdish–Turkish conflict ===
The fight against Kurdish separatists, most notably the Kurdistan Workers' Party (PKK), reached its apex in the early 1990s. The PKK wanted to proclaim independence by 1994 at the latest, with their breakaway state centered in Şırnak. The PKK essentially controlled the towns of Şırnak and Cizre from their hiding posts in the mountains of Cudi, Gabar, and Namaz.

The military decided that anyone who could be persuaded to fight the PKK—not just the military, but the police, the mafia, defected Kurdish opposition groups, Village guards etc.—had to make a concerted effort. The "1993 Strategy" was drafted. It called for targeting individuals suspected of financing the PKK, pre-emptively catching members of the PKK using special forces, comprehensive psychological warfare, and a revamping of the military's inventory.

The proposal brought before the National Security Council was initially rejected. Notable detractors were president Turgut Özal and general Eşref Bitlis, who favored a peaceful solution. Both died in 1993. Bitlis was killed in a plane crash, while Özal purportedly died of a heart attack. Çiller's rhetoric became more hawkish after this period.

With the opposition out of the way, the plan was executed, with Lieutenant General Hasan Kundakçı at the helm of the military operations. Professional assassins like Abdullah Çatlı and Alaattin Çakıcı took part, along with 2,500–5,000 members of the special forces. Many of these men were plucked from the ranks of the clandestine Counter-Guerrilla; the Turkish branch of the Operation Gladio. The Counter-Guerrilla was originally established to prepare for the subversion of a possible Warsaw Pact invasion. However, once the USSR dissolved, the Counter-Guerrilla were used to fight the PKK.

It is alleged that during this period, a delegate including Çiller, Demirel, Hüsamettin Cindoruk (Speaker of the Parliament), Aydın İlter (General Commander of the Gendarmerie), Nahit Menteşe (Interior Minister), and Ağar (as police chief) held a meeting with twelve tribal chiefs. (Note: Ahmet Zeydan, Tahir Adiyaman, Kamil Atak, Abdurrahman Ozbek, Suleyman Tatar, Abdurrahman Seylan, Hazim Abat, Osman Demir, Ramazan Cetin, Dilbaz Uncu, Isterder Ertus and Hakki Ture. The source that follows has details on the tribes of Adiyaman, Ture, Tatar, Babat, and Benek.) The officials assured these warlords, known to have lengthy criminal records, (Note: Failing to report let alone employing convicted criminals is a violation of Article 296 of the Turkish Criminal Code.) that the state would supply them with whatever arms they needed in order to fight the PKK. The warlords requested MG-3 machine guns, rocket-propelled grenades, flame throwers, howitzers, and police tanks. The brass refused the last two items, and compensated by increasing the wages of the village guards (militias) under the warlords' employ.

In September 1993, Ağar, Eken, Şahin, Ertuğrul Ogan and weapons trafficker Ertaç Tinar traveled to Israel over Zurich. Ağar contacted senior Israeli intelligence officials. After some bargaining, Eken took delivery of US$50 million worth of weapons (though only half of it was paid for) from the Özel Harekat Dairesi (ÖHD, police special forces department). On paper, the weapons appeared to be donated from Tinar's company, Hospro. Some of them later went missing; 10 9mm Micro Uzis, 10 Super MGs, and 10 22-caliber Beretta revolvers with silencers, plus an AL 50Hv rocket launcher. Three of the Berettas were found in the Susurluk crash. A criminal investigation was launched against the deputy chair of the ÖHD, İbrahim Şahin, but he suffered a traffic accident and claimed to have lost his memory.

On 3 November 1994, Çiller, Köksal, Eymür, and Ağar left for Israel to establish a co-operation agreement on counter-terrorism and intelligence sharing. This was the first meeting between the prime ministers of the two countries. Çiller and Ağar—not the MİT officials—privately talked to MOSSAD officials about equipment they needed to catch Öcalan, who was in Syria. A rich assortment of assassination weapons was delivered to the ÖHD on 15 November, including 2 12.7-caliber Beretta telescopic rifles, 8 pump-action shotguns, 280 automatic Uzis, 20 7.62mm Galli rifles, 100 silencers, 145 rifle telescopes. Can Dündar suggests that the weapons were used for political purposes other than to assassinate Öcalan.

The chairman of the Workers' Party, Doğu Perinçek, alleged that "the Mafia-Gladio dictatorship" was subordinate to Çiller and Ağar.

==== Turf war ====
The origins of the turf war date back to the reprisal operations in the 1980s against the militant Armenian organization ASALA. Former president Kenan Evren ordered the MİT to organize a special forces unit headed by Çatlı in order to attack members of the ASALA and the PKK. MİT's Deputy Regional Director Metin Günyol formed the team, composed of Çatlı (alias Mehmet Sarol), Oral Çelik (Atilla Çelik) and Mehmet Şener (Durmuş Unutmaz). Others included former nationalist club leaders Ramiz Ongun, Enver Tortaş, Tevfik Esensoy, Bedri Ateş (Uğur Özgöbek), Rıfat Yıldırım, Türkmen Onur and Üzeyir Bayraklı. (Note: This information was among twelve pages of the Inspection Board report that were classified; it can be found in folder 171 of the Ergenekon indictment's annex.)

After the operations, Çatlı was distanced from the MİT for engaging in criminal activities for personal gain. He drifted to the police force, led by Mehmet Ağar. Once a Counter-Terrorism department was established in the MİT by 1996, Çatlı's unit came to be perceived as a competitor.

Fikri Sağlar of the Republican People's Party (CHP) says Chief of Staff Doğan Güreş was behind much of the planning that led to the turf war between the MİT and the police force. (After Güreş stepped down from the military in August 1994, he joined Çiller's party, DYP.) Sağlar alleges that Güreş suggested the appointment of Nuri Gündeş as undersecretary of the MİT, but the president's office refused, so Çiller had Gündeş create a separate intelligence agency called the Public Security Headquarters (Turkish: Kamu Güvenlik Başkanlığı, curiously shortening to KGB). Upon hearing news of unsavory activity from the KGB, president Süleyman Demirel had it dismantled. The MİT defended itself against Ağar and Gündeş by appointing their rival, Mehmet Eymür, who had dished the dirt on the former two in a 1987 report. Not to be outdone, Ağar hired Korkut Eken as someone who was knowledgeable about Eymür. The scandal happened only because of Çiller's incompetence, said Sağlar.

=== Mafias ===
The deputy chairman of ANAP, Yaşar Okuyan, broke down the mafia revenue (per annum, in trillion TL (now million TL)) as follows: 500 (drugs), 200 (gambling), 300 (money laundering). The total is equivalent to a black money market of $3.5 billion/year.

Three of the better-known gangs involved in scandal were the Kocaeli Gang (Hadi Özcan), the Söylemez Gang and the Yüksekova Gang. The Soylemez Brothers gang (which included serving police and military) were caught with plans to raid the headquarters of the Bucak clan in Siverek, Urfa, the head of which is the DYP member of parliament (MP) Sedat Bucak, the only survivor of the crash. The blood feud between the Bucaks and the Söylemez gang is allegedly based on the fight between PKK and Bucaks.

==== Drug trafficking ====
Turkish authorities had claimed that those security officers, politicians and other authorities who had been involved in drug trafficking were initially tasked with preventing the Turkish mafia and the PKK from profiting from illegal activities, such as drug trafficking, but that these officials then captured the business and fought over who would control it.

The authorities pocketed billions of dollars in profits from the drug smuggling. This illegal activity on the state's part was partly motivated, or at least justified as such, by the tens of billions of dollars in loss of trade with Iraq due to the Gulf War. To put this into perspective, the Turkish heroin trade, then worth $50 billion, exceeded the state budget of $48 billion. (Other sources quote the 1998 budget as $62 billion and the drug market as $70 billion, though only a fraction of this was tapped as commission.)

==== Gambling and money laundering ====
The proceeds from drugs entered the market through casinos.

The "casino king" Ömer Lütfü Topal was one of the key figures in this aspect of the scandal. Tanju Akça sold such specialties and traded with Ömer Lütfü Topal, with bribes of valuable materials. Allied with foreign guerrilla, now branched out to countries with no boundary to their patrolling. One famous journalist wrote that many one-time nobodies suddenly became big politicians after entering the money laundering business, because the political parties were deeply involved in it (to finance their campaigns).

In response to public outrage, anti–money laundering legislation was passed in 1996, and regulations to implement it was put into place the next year.

=== Extrajudicial killings ===
Prime minister Çiller sanctioned the killing of businessmen who were suspected of lending financial support to the PKK.

The victims included "casino king" Ömer Lütfü Topal, Savaş Buldan, and Behçet Cantürk. Medet Serhat, who was Behçet Cantürk's one time lawyer, but respected by Cantürk as an elder brother, was also murdered although his business was legal, but he was a political figure.

Police chief Hanefi Avcı said that the gangs fell into infighting after alleged PKK financiers Behçet Cantürk and Savaş Buldan were assassinated, as the gangs had completed their mission of dismantling the PKK's financial foundation.

The police force's Special Operations Department (Turkish: Özel Harekat Dairesi, ÖHD) was held responsible for some of the lawless killings. Nuran Yorulmaz, the mother of a Susurluk convict, recently spoke out, said Veli Küçük had ordered his son Oğuz (of the ÖHD) to kill almost 100 people. Oğuz Yorulmaz was killed on 29 May 2005 in a bar.

Brigadier General Veli Küçük, who was Giresun's Gendarmerie Regional Commander, was said by the parliamentary report to be the head of the Gendarmerie's covert counter-terrorism and intelligence wing, JİTEM. Küçük denies JİTEM's existence to this day, although there is a mountain of circumstantial evidence to the contrary.

== Events ==
=== 24 January 1993: Uğur Mumcu assassination ===
Uğur Mumcu was a Turkish investigative journalist for the daily Cumhuriyet. In his 8 January Cumhuriyet article, titled Ültimatom, Mumcu emphatically stated that he would soon reveal in a new book the ties between Kurdish nationalists and some intelligence organizations (i.e., Abdullah Öcalan and the National Intelligence Organization). On the morning of 24 January 1993, Mumcu left his home and was killed by a C-4 plastic bomb as he started his car, a Renault 12. There are numerous hypotheses over who was responsible for his murder. Given the various links (at organizational and personal level) between the Turkish deep state and Turkish armed forces, Counter-Guerrilla, Kurdish forces and the CIA and Mossad, the hypotheses are not necessarily mutually exclusive, especially as Mumcu was investigating some of these links.

=== 17 February 1993: Death of General Eşref Bitlis, Commander of Gendarmerie ===
Twenty-five days after the death of Mumcu, Gen. Eşref Bitlis, who had been investigating the same issue, died in a plane crash, believed to be due to sabotage. His Beechcraft Super King Air B-200 crashed minutes after taking off from the air base. Bitlis, his aide-de-camp Fahir Işık, technician Emir Öner and the pilots, who had VIP green card certification for excellence in flying, died in the crash. The chief of staff, Gen. Doğan Güreş, said the accident was due to atmospheric icing but this has been denied by the manufacturer and experts from Istanbul Technical University and Middle East Technical University. According to the Etimesgut Air Base Weather Department's weather report for that day, there was no ice accumulation: "Calm, windy, 1,500 meters visibility, snowy, low clouds affected. Cloud level 800 feet, peak 8,000 feet. The weather is completely overcast. The temperature is −4 degrees and the pressure is 1,018 milibars."" The military prosecutor who initially investigated the incident, Col. Hasan Tüysüzoğlu, remained convinced twenty years later that the crash was due to sabotage, and said that the dossier was taken from him, and no further investigation deemed necessary.

=== 28 January 1995: Iranian spy assassinations ===
According to Eymür, Susurluk was set in motion by the narcotics-related murder of two Kurds, Askar Simitko and Lazım Esmaeili in 1995. Simitko and Esmaeili were moles working for the MİT inside SAVAMA. However, the MİT was not aware of their drug smuggling, which resulted in their death due to a nonpayment of a "tribute".

=== 28 July 1996: Ömer Lütfü Topal assassination ===
Casino king Ömer Lütfü Topal was assassinated on 28 July. He had convictions for drug smuggling, and was dubbed the "casino king" for the gambling ventures that made his later fortune, which amounted to around $1 billion at the time of his assassination. An extensive 1999 study by the Ministry of Finance contained the following facts on Topal:

He shot from rags to riches in just five years; in 1991 he owned but a cafeteria. He had withdrawn 4.1 trillion Lira from gamblers' credit cards. In sum, 14.5 trillion TL, US$98 million, and 23 million DM were deposited into his 137 bank accounts. A significant number of his 452 properties were acquired as payment for gambling debts. A significant source of gambling revenue was poker, raising ~$750m between 1994 and 1996.

Topal was also accorded lengthy coverage in the Inspection Board report. Its author, Kutlu Savaş, wrote that Topal would have become a drug lord that posed a threat to the government if unstopped. In 1995, he made certain attempts to take over the management of some hotels and casinos in Ashgabat in Turkmenistan.

Topal was gunned down on July 28, 1996 with a Kalashnikov rifle. Links to the government began to appear which would later feed into the Susurluk scandal. Abdullah Çatlı's fingerprint was allegedly found on the drum of one of the machine guns used. Ayhan Çarkın and two other policemen were acquitted for lack of evidence; in 2008 the trial judge claimed this was due to a sabotage of the investigation.

=== 3 November 1996: car crash and investigations ===
The scandal began after a Mercedes 600 SEL owned by MP Sedat Bucak crashed into a truck near Çatalceviz, Susurluk in the Balıkesir province in Turkey. The crash took place on 3 November 1996 at around 19:25. It was an assassination arranged by the MİT of a number of individuals traveling together; one of the four intended victims survived the crash. Abdullah Çatlı, a former ultra-rightist militant wanted by police for multiple murders and drug trafficking; Huseyin Kocadağ, a senior police official; and beauty queen Gonca Us (Çatlı's girlfriend) were killed. Bucak himself escaped with a broken leg and fractured skull. The victims of the crash, plus Interior Minister Mehmet Ağar, had been staying at the Onura Hotel in Kuşadası.

The assassination plan called for Ağar to be killed too. However, he was warned by Sami Hoştan, so he remained at the hotel and told the rest to leave without him. The Prosecutor's Report said that the passengers in the car were themselves on their way to stage an assassination.

Ağar initially denied any links, but under media and political opposition pressure resigned on 8 November. His successor, Meral Akşener, announced that she had fired Istanbul Chief of Police Kemal Yazıcıoğlu, Police Security Department head Hanefi Avcı and several members of the police special forces.

Parliament decided on 12 November to launch a commission of inquiry into links between police, politicians, and organised crime, and on 22 December President Suleyman Demirel brought party leaders together to seek consensus on investigating these issues. The investigation identified a falsified passport and gun license signed by the Turkish Interior Minister Mehmet Ağar, who had met with the group shortly before the accident. Parliament voted on 11 December to strip Ağar and Bucak of their parliamentary immunity.

== Reactions ==
=== Official ===
The initial response of the Interior Minister Mehmet Ağar, who was allegedly one of the targets, was to undermine the investigation. First he denied that Çatlı was present, then he said that Çatlı was being delivered to the authorities, then he said a special investigation was not needed. He relented by allowing the sole survivor, Bucak, to speak.

Since 1950, people having been talking about Counter-Guerrillas, gladiators, this and that...for thirty years. Which has been shown to be true, to be evidenced, to be exposed? None of them.

— Interior Minister Mehmet Ağar on Operation Gladio and the Counter-Guerrilla (29 June 1998),

We will follow the facts wherever they may lead. No-one can cover up Susurluk!

— President Süleyman Demirel.

They accuse the Turkish Republic of making use of illegal forces. The president, the police forces and even the Parliament are faced with murder allegations. Nobody has the right to suspect a great state...We face a situation where we are stabbing ourselves in the back. Even the Greeks wouldn't be able to do something like this to us

— Deputy Prime Minister Tansu Çiller likening detractors to traitors.

Those who fire bullets or suffer their wounds in the name of this country, this nation, and this state will always be respectfully remembered by us.

— Deputy Prime Minister Tansu Çiller on contract killer Abdullah Çatlı.

Çiller had her speeches written by her advisors at the Analitik Grubu, whose members included Mümtazer Türköne; allegedly an acquaintance of Çatlı from the Grey Wolves leadership, and currently a columnist for Zaman. Nationalist Movement Party (MHP) deputy Tuğrul Türkeş alleges that Türköne was subordinate to Çatlı.

Alparslan Türkeş, of the fascist MHP, also spoke out in defense of Çatlı. Meanwhile, party chairman Devlet Bahçeli vehemently denied any MHP involvement.

On 15 January 1998, Deputy Prime Minister Bülent Ecevit drew attention to skulduggery by JİTEM; the intelligence wing of the Gendarmerie.

Following the censorship of some pages of the report, HADEP Deputy Chairman Osman Özçelik drew attention to the involvement of state-sponsored gangs in ostensibly solving the Kurdish problem.

=== Civilian ===
Several demonstrations, some of which were proscribed, were organized in protest against the corruption and illegal activities uncovered by the investigations. A popular nationwide event, known as "Sürekli Aydınlık İçin Bir Dakika Karanlık" ("One minute's darkness for the sake of perpetual light"), was organized to protest the "satanic triangle" (a nationalist mafia leader, a high ranking police officer, and a member of parliament). Participants all around the country turned off the lights every night at 9pm. Later this was changed to flashing the lights. This practice lasted from 1–28 February 1997. The Deputy Chair of the DYP, Mehmet Golhan, denounced the protestors as traitors, while prime minister Necmettin Erbakan, of the Welfare Party, called them "parasites and conspirators...who have nothing to do apart from intrigue".

Some commentators felt that the public reaction was mute compared with the weight of the crime, and thus constituted tacit approval. In other words, the accused concluded the populace believed they had indeed been working in the best interests of the state.

== Investigation ==
Three reports were prepared in the wake of the scandal. The first was by the National Intelligence Organization (MİT). Suspicions about the truthfulness of the MİT report led to the commissioning of a second report, by the chairman of the Prime Minister's Inspection Board (Turkish: Başbakanlık Teftiş Kurulu Başkanı), Kutlu Savaş. 12 of the 124 pages of this report, dated 22 January 1998, were classified. (Note: The missing parts of the Inspection Board report: "12 yasak sayfa". Taraf (in Turkish). 2008-08-09. Archived from the original on 2010-02-28.) Finally, a parliamentary investigation commission headed by Mehmet Elkatmış published a 350-page Susurluk Report in April 1997.

Addressing the Susurluk commission, CHP deputy Fikri Sağlar said that True Path Party leaders Tansu Çiller and Mehmet Ağar were at the heart of the scandal, and personally responsible for the "politics and economy becoming Mafia-like". Sağlar attempted and failed to obtain the testimony of several people, including Teoman Koman, Necdet Üruğ, Veli Küçük, Tansu and Özer Çiller. When Tansu Çiller threatened to break the coalition government, prime minister Necmettin Erbakan prevented the Çillers' testimony from being taken. Ağar kept mum, revealing only that he had acted in accordance with the NSC's plan (from 1993).

If a super-prosecutor like di Pietro came forward in Turkey, tomorrow he would be dragged through Taksim Square as an enemy of the nation.

— Intelligence expert Mahir Kaynak on why the investigation failed (cf. mani pulite).

=== MİT report ===
The MİT report showed that Çatlı was at the Ankara Sheraton Hotel on 24 August 1996 in the company of a delegation from Brunei. He arrived at the hotel in a BMW with a false identification plate (06 KE 889). Though police had been informed about his whereabouts no one apprehended him because he was carrying a police ID card.

=== Inspection Board report ===
Among others, the Inspection Board contained the following allegations:

- Bucak was close to Ağar and OHAL regional governor Ünal Erkan.
- Passports and police identity cards were issue recklessly by the Ankara police.
- Several people, including MİT officers Nuri Gündeş and Mehmet Eymür, and the Inspection Board Chairman Kutlu Savaş communicated with the Prime Minister (Tansu Çiller) through her husband, Özer Çiller. Eymür also called Meral Akşener, Tolga Şakir Atik, Adil Öngen, and Ağar.
- Ömer Lütfü Topal's partner Ali Fevzi Bir is connected to Abdullah Çatlı, and policemen Oğuz Yorulmaz and Mustafa Altunok.
- Convicted murderer Mahmut Yıldırım, code name Yeşil (Green), was a MİT agent who had infiltrated the mafia. A cell phone belonging to Yeşil was found registered under Küçük's name. Küçük at the time said he talked to crime world leaders, such as Abdullah Çatlı, Sami Hoştan and Sedat Peker, only to get intelligence. However, the same phone had been called dozens of times by crime leaders, including Çatlı, and "casino king" Ömer Lütfü Topal. In response to a question from a journalist asking why the state employed criminals such as Yeşil, an anonymous senior MİT officer said that the MİT could think of no other way to infiltrate criminal gangs.

=== Parliamentary report ===
During an investigation conducted by the parliamentary commission on the Susurluk incident, Hanefi Avcı, the deputy chief of police intelligence, divulged connections and the names of senior officials, who were providing protection to gang leaders. Avcı also revealed a connection of a questionable nature between Çakıcı and Mehmet Eymür of the MİT.

Elkatmış said that the Chief of the General Staff, İsmail Hakkı Karadayı, prevented him from obtaining Küçük's testimony, saying that there was no need.

The commission's report maintained that the state organs used the Grey Wolves and that some state forces initiated the right-left conflicts in the 1970s.

=== Deaths of investigators ===
A number of Susurluk investigators died in suspicious car accidents curiously similar to the Susurluk car crash itself (rear-end collision with a truck). These include Judge Akman Akyürek, MIT investigator Ertugrul Berkman (both 1997) and Susurluk Commission member Bedri İncetahtacı (1999).

== Aftermath ==
Although Ağar and Çiller resigned after the scandal, no one received any punitive sentences. Ağar was eventually re-elected to Parliament (as a leader of the True Path Party, DYP), and the sole survivor of the crash, chieftain Sedat Bucak, was released. Some reforms were made; e.g., the intelligence agency was restructured to end the infighting (with Eymür's department entirely dismantled). Some hold that the scandal was made possible by the wresting of control of the MİT away from the Turkish military in 1992.

The European market for heroin contracted as other drugs, especially cocaine and ecstasy, took over. In 2008, the Istanbul police seized 11 tons of drugs, 3.2 of which was heroin.

=== Arrests and convictions ===
- Oğuz Yorulmaz. Arrested 13 January 1997 and sentenced to 4 years in prison.
- Sami Hoştan. Arrested 6 February 1998, released 4 May 1998.
- İbrahim Şahin. Convicted on 12 February 2001 to 6 years in prison.
- Korkut Eken. Convicted on 12 February 2001 to 6 years in prison.
- Alaattin Çakıcı. Arrested 16 August 1998; escaped.

=== Reforms ===
The new undersecretary, Şenkal Atasagun, turned the MİT around, relocating Eymür and Ataç abroad, out of harm's way. Eymür eventually found residence in McLean, Virginia; the seat of the CIA. He faces charges of revealing state secrets and spying for the United States. Ataç too has been labeled a CIA asset.

A Draft Law on Struggling With Organized Crime and another draft on the legalization of JİTEM, allowing the Gendarmerie to legally carry out intelligence activities, were also prepared as consequences of this scandal.

Çiller ordered all casinos in Turkey to be closed.

=== Resignations and promotions ===
Ağar resigned when it became obvious that Çatlı was a police collaborator. On the other hand, 44 senior officials who were under investigation were promoted, including:

- İbrahim Şahin. Former Special Operations Department deputy chief.
- Behçet Oktay. Current Special Operations Department deputy chief.
- Hasan Kocadağ (brother of Hüseyin Kocadağ, who was killed in the car crash). Became the Police Department's deputy chief.
- Mehmet Çağlar and Şükrü Gürler. Headmaster's assistants of Istanbul Etiler Police School.
- Bedri Yanar. Chief of security (body guards) for the Prime Minister.

Şahin was close to ülkücü circles and Çatlı in particular, having been pictured dancing with him in a wedding. Şahin had provided numerous hitmen (Çatlı included) with passports through the Nevşehir police. In 1984 he was sentenced to two years in prison for torturing numerous people, but his conviction was overturned by the Supreme Court (Turkish: Yargıtay) on a technicality, indicating the support of powerful actors behind the scenes.

=== Çakıcı's arrest ===
During Şenkal Atasagun's restructuring of the MİT, Yavuz Ataç was exiled to Beijing on 24 October 1997 for involvement with the mafia. The next month, Ataç handed Çakıcı the red passport that allowed him to travel freely.

Çakıcı was arrested on 16 August 1998 in France, carrying a diplomatic passport, after he allegedly threatened potential buyers of the Turkish Commerce Bank (Turkish: Turk Ticaret Bankasi) over the telephone. He was extradited, imprisoned, then released. On the day of his final arrest, 3 May 2004, he escaped to Italy on a visa given to him at the Italian consulate.

CHP deputy Fikri Sağlar alleges that Çakıcı deliberately chose to be apprehended in France, a country with a developed judicial system, and that he even contacted a lawyer beforehand. Çakıcı was allegedly in possession of incriminating information about other government officials at the time of his arrest. Turkey's ambassador to France at the time was Sönmez Köksal—the undersecretary of the MİT until February 1998.

Ataç had originally planned to give the passport to Mehmet Can Kulaksızoğlu, the fugitive leader of the Turkish Revenge Brigade and suspected mastermind behind the assassination attempt on Human Rights Association chairman Akın Birdal.

Çakıcı's arrest was timed to coincide with the wedding of Interior Minister Mehmet Ağar's son. Presidents Evren and Demirel were invited. Upon being informed of the arrest, Demirel changed his mind at the last minute about attending. The Çakıcı operation was not publicly revealed until 20:30, when the marriage ceremony took place.

=== Ergenekon ===
Ten years after the scandal, another gang called "Ergenekon" was discovered and tried. The chairman of the Susurluk commission, Mehmet Elkatmış, said that the two organizations were identical except in name. One of its key figures, Tuncay Güney, turned out to be subordinate to Eymür. ÖHD deputy chief Şahin was detained in January 2009. Three maps in his possession led to the recovery of numerous weapons from scattered arms caches in Ankara. They turned out not to be the missing weapons from Susurluk.

Öcalan evaded assassination after a television reporter, Yalçın Küçük, publicized the plan on the PKK's TV channel, MED-TV. Küçük was also detained in the Ergenekon investigation.

== Legacy ==
According to historian Ryan Gingeras, "Turkish politics changed forever" as a result of the scandal, as it affirmed suspicions in the public consciousness that the Turkish government knowingly associated with professional criminals and encouraged illicit acts of violence. He writes:

Susurluk's revelations validated the worst anxieties and suspicions of many Turkish citizens in the 1990s. Çatlı's presence alongside Bucak and Kocadağ made it impossible to refute the claim that the government relied upon gangsters to commit extra-judicial killings of dissidents and militants. It added further confirmation that Ankara's "dirty war" against the PKK knew few limits. The links the three men shared further inferred that the Turkish state and its security apparatus possessed a permissive relationship with organized crime. Taken as a whole, Susurluk demonstrated the profound levels of corruption and malaise that had set over the country at the century's end.

== See also ==
- Deep state
- Ergenekon trials
- Operation Sledgehammer
- Ziverbey Villa

== Bibliography ==
- 1996 Report (PDF) (Report). Ankara: Human Rights Foundation of Turkey. 1998. ISBN 975-7217-20-4. Archived from the original (PDF) on 2009-02-05. (in English)
- 1998 Report (PDF) (Report). Ankara: Human Rights Foundation of Turkey. 2000. Archived from the original (PDF) on 2009-02-05. (contains the Susurluk reports in the annex, and material on the Counter-Guerrilla) (in English)
