= Mehmet Ağar =

Turkish politician (born 1951)

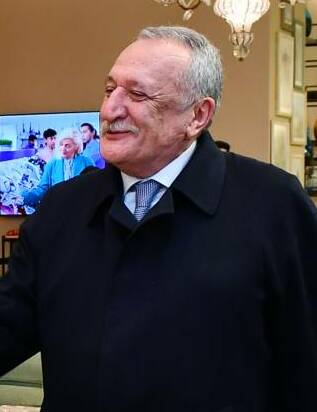
- Ağar in 2023

Minister of Interior
- In office June 26, 1996 – November 8, 1996
- Prime Minister: Necmettin Erbakan
- Preceded by: Ülkü Güney
- Succeeded by: Meral Akşener

Minister of Justice
- In office March 6, 1996 – June 29, 1996
- Prime Minister: Mesut Yılmaz
- Preceded by: Firuz Çilingiroğlu
- Succeeded by: Şevket Kazan

Personal details
- Born: October 30, 1951 (age 75) Çankaya, Ankara, Turkey
- Party: True Path Party (DYP)
- Spouse: Emel Ağar (m. 1974)
- Children: 2
- Education: Ankara University
- Occupation: Politician

Mehmet Kemal Ağar (born 30 October 1951) is a Turkish former police chief, politician, government minister and leader of the Democratic Party. He was a police officer who rose to General Director of the General Directorate of Security (effectively national police chief), serving from 1993 to 1995, before entering parliament and serving as a government minister in 1996. Under his reign a close relationship developed between the deep state in Turkey, the Grey Wolves, and the Turkish mafia. It took 15 years until he was tried and sentenced for criminal activities relating to the 1996 Susurluk scandal; he was incarcerated in April 2012 but already released on probation in April 2013.

From 2018-2021 he managed the luxury marina "Yalikavak Marina" near Bodrum, but was forced to resign after mafia boss Sedat Peker blew the whistle with his 2021 videos.

== Background and personal life ==
Mehmet Ağar was born on October 30, 1951, at the state president's official residence Çankaya Köşkü in Ankara, where his father was serving as security. During his youth, he toured several places across the country due to his father's position as police chief.

He began his high school education in Ankara, continued in Haydarpaşa High School in Istanbul finishing in 1968. He studied finance in the School of Political Science at the University of Ankara on scholarship from the Turkish General Directorate of Security. Graduated in 1972, Mehmet Ağar became a police officer.

Mehmet Ağar, married in 1974 Emel Ağar. The couple has a son Tolga and a daughter Yasemin.

== Career ==
He later served as a police inspector in the security force for the state president. In 1976, Ağar was appointed vice district governor in İznik and Selçuk. He later became district governor in Torul and Delice. In 1980, he was assigned assistant director to the counter-terrorism section of Istanbul Police. The next year, he was promoted to director of security in Istanbul. At the same time, he became chief of the Counter-Guerrilla, a clandestine stay-behind anti-communist initiative backed by NATO and the United States.

Mehmet Ağar served between 1984 and 1988 as the vice police chief of Istanbul for the General Directorate of Security (Turkish National Police). Ağar featured in Mehmet Eymür's controversial 1987 MİT Report that targeted former high ranking civil servants and politicians such as Ağar, Nevzat Ayaz and Ünal Erkan.

In 1988, he became police chief of Ankara and in 1990 Istanbul Chief of Police. Following a brief service as governor of the police province of Erzurum between 1992 and 1993, he was appointed in July 1993 director general of the General Directorate of Security - in effect the national police chief. Under his leadership the Police Special Forces (Özel Harekat Dairesi) within the General Directorate of Security was run by İbrahim Şahin; Ağar supported its co-operation with the Gendarmerie against the Kurdistan Workers' Party PKK in rural areas.

He resigned from the police after entering parliament in 1995.

=== Political career ===
Ağar entered politics as deputy of Elazığ from the True Path Party (DYP) following the general elections 1995.

He was appointed the Minister of Justice in 1996. In the next government's coalition cabinet he served as the Minister of the Interior. He resigned from this post on November 8, 1996, protesting Prime Minister Necmettin Erbakan's official visit to Libya. In the 1999 general elections, Ağar ran for a seat in the parliament as independent deputy from Elazığ, and received the highest number of votes an independent candidate ever achieved.

The True Path Party (DYP) lost the 2002 parliamentary elections and Tansu Çiller resigned as leader of the party and retired from politics. Mehmet Ağar was the only representative of the party elected in the 2002 election from Elazığ and entered the Turkish Grand National Assembly. After Çiller's resignation, Ağar was elected as the new president of the True Path Party (DYP).

On May 5, 2007, it was announced that DYP and the Motherland Party (ANAP) would merge to form the Democratic Party (Demokrat Parti). For that occasion, DYP renamed itself (based on the previous party of the same name), and it was planned that ANAP would join the newly founded DP.

Following the 22 July 2007 election Ağar resigned from his position as the leader of DP .

=== Susurluk scandal, 1996 ===
With the Susurluk scandal of 1996, his political career ended for some time when it turned out he had stayed in a hotel with the victims of the Susurluk car crash immediately before the incident. He famously said "I will talk if the deep state wants me to" to a commission investigating the affair. He escaped justice at the time due to his parliamentary immunity, however, he was retried starting on February 9, 2009, at the Ankara 11th High Criminal Court.

The Susurluk report contained the following information:

- On 19 October 1984, when he was İstanbul Deputy Chief of Police, he held a meeting with ultra-nationalist activist Celal Adan.
- On July 3, 1985, while serving as Public Order Branch Director at İstanbul Police HQ, he contacted owners of a company, İbrahim Aslan and Mahmut Şahin, who were followers of the Süleymancı sect, and gave them the files and other information about the investigation carried out against members of the Süleymancı sect, which should have been kept secret.
- On September 4, 1986, ultra-nationalist activist Selim Kaptanoğlu declared that "they had been engaged in collecting of checks and vouchers; they had collected money from the Mafia bosses in the name of Alparslan Türkeş; they had given part of this money to Alpaslan Türkeş and another part to the ultra-nationalist activists in the prisons; and while doing this they had been in close contact to the Deputy Chief of Police, Mehmet Ağar."
- It was determined that on December 5, 1990, he took a bribe from Kemal Kaçar of the Süleymancı sect.
- He pushed for ultra-nationalists candidates to be chosen to the Police Academy in the examinations of the academy held on September 29, 1993.
- He was elected Member of the Parliament from Elazığ for True Path Party (DYP) in the general elections held on December 24, 1995.
- Ağar was assigned the post of Minister of Justice in the cabinet of the 53rd Government, the coalition government of Motherland Party (ANAP) and DYP in 1996. He became Minister of the Interior in the 54th Government, the coalition government of Welfare Party (RP) and DYP formed in the same year; and he resigned on November 8, 1996.

=== Trial, 2008, Sentence 2011 and release 2013 ===
On September 15, 2011, he was sentenced to five years in prison for his role in the Susurluk scandal as the leader of a criminal organization. Following the High Court of Appeals's approval of the ruling made by the criminal court in Ankara, he was interned on April 25, 2012, in a small district prison of type K1 in Yenipazar, Aydın, which was chosen for his personal security reasons. After his sentence was reduced to three years and nine months, he was released on probation in April 2013.

=== 2018-present ===
In 2018, Mehmet Ağar was appointed as manager of the luxury marina "Yalikavak Marina" near Bodrum. He was forced to resign after Sedat Peker blew the whistle with his 2021 videos exposing his connection to Alaattin Çakici, the "Padrone" and rival of Sedat Peker.

== Books ==
- Sefa Kaplan (2007), Mehmet Ağar: Geleceği etkileyecek liderler, Doğan Kitapçılık

Party political offices
Preceded by Tansu Çiller	Leader of the True Path Party (DYP); Dec 14, 2002 – Jan 6, 2008	Succeeded by Süleyman Soylu
