= Korkut Eken =

Turkish military officer (born 1945)

Korkut Eken (born 1945) is a former Turkish military officer and National Intelligence Organization (MİT) agent. He became involved in the Susurluk scandal in Turkey after some of his subordinates, notably Ayhan Çarkın, were convicted of extrajudicial killings. In 2001, among the first convictions arising from the scandal, Eken was found guilty of establishing and managing a criminal gang with the aim of "creating panic in society" and sentenced to six years in prison.

== Career ==
Eken joined the Turkish Military Academy in 1963. He took part in the Cyprus landings on 20 July 1974. He joined the Special Warfare Department (Turkish: Özel Harp Dairesi) in 1978. He received training in special warfare in Germany, the United Kingdom, and the United States. He gained fame in 1981 after he led a raid to rescue a plane seized by Islamic militants in Diyarbakır.

Eken was once involved in an ice producing business in Antalya with an MİT colleague called Mehmet Eymür; however this partnership ended after five years on acrimonious terms.
