= Police Special Operation Department =

Polis Özel Harekât Dairesi
- Active: 1983–present
- Country: Turkey
- Branch: General Directorate of Security
- Type: Police tactical unit
- Size: 22,000
- Part of: Respective municipality-level police departments
- Garrison/HQ: Ankara, Turkey
- Nicknames: PÖH, Üç Harfliler
- Mascot: Eagle

Commanders
- Current commander: Ünsal HAYAL
- Notable commanders: Behçet Oktay

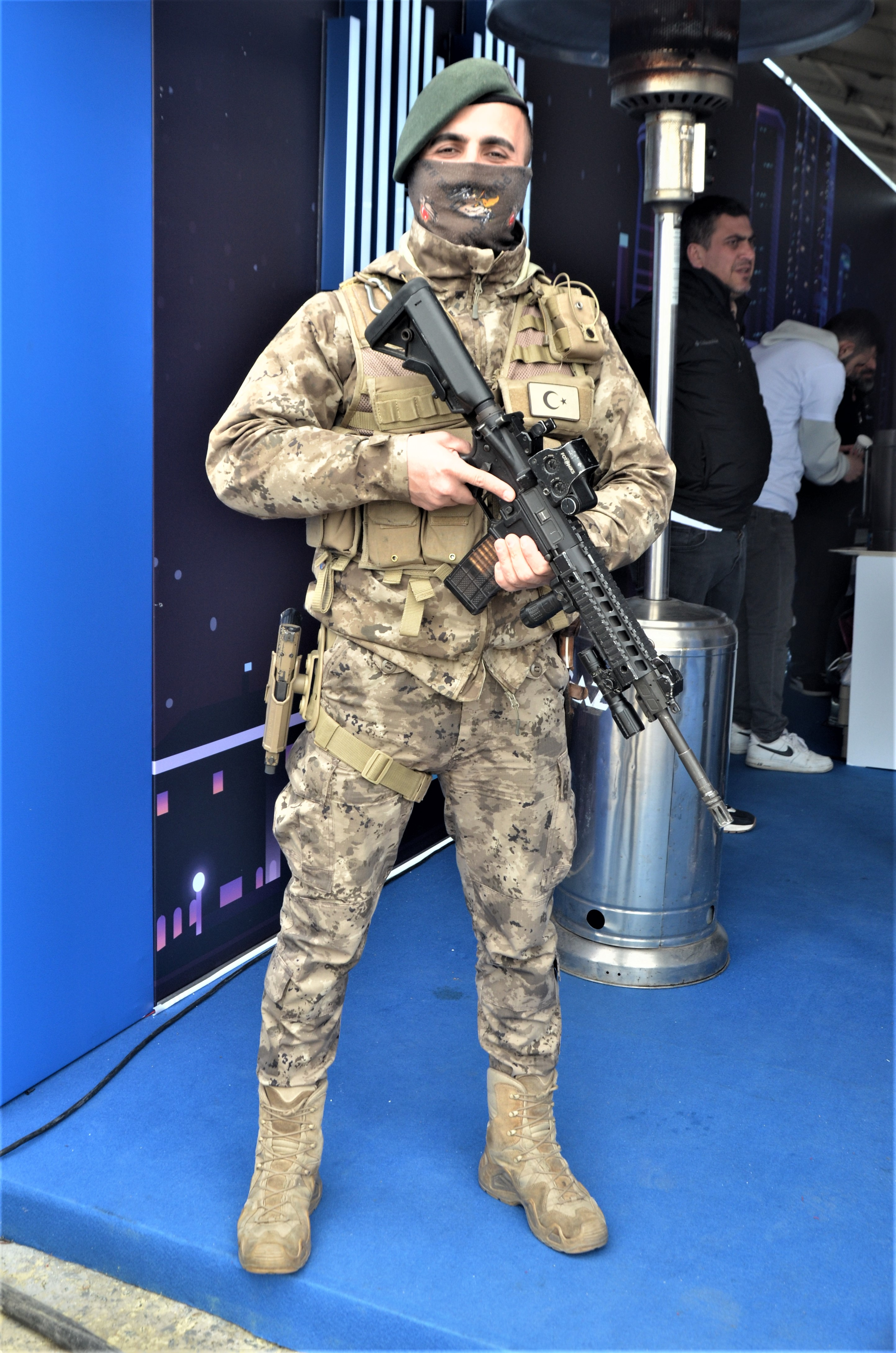
PÖH officer in International Defence Industry Fair.

The Police Special Operations Department (Turkish: Polis Özel Harekât Dairesi) or Police Special Action (Turkish: Polis Özel Harekât), abbreviated as PÖH, is a police tactical unit of the General Directorate of Security in Turkey.

== History ==
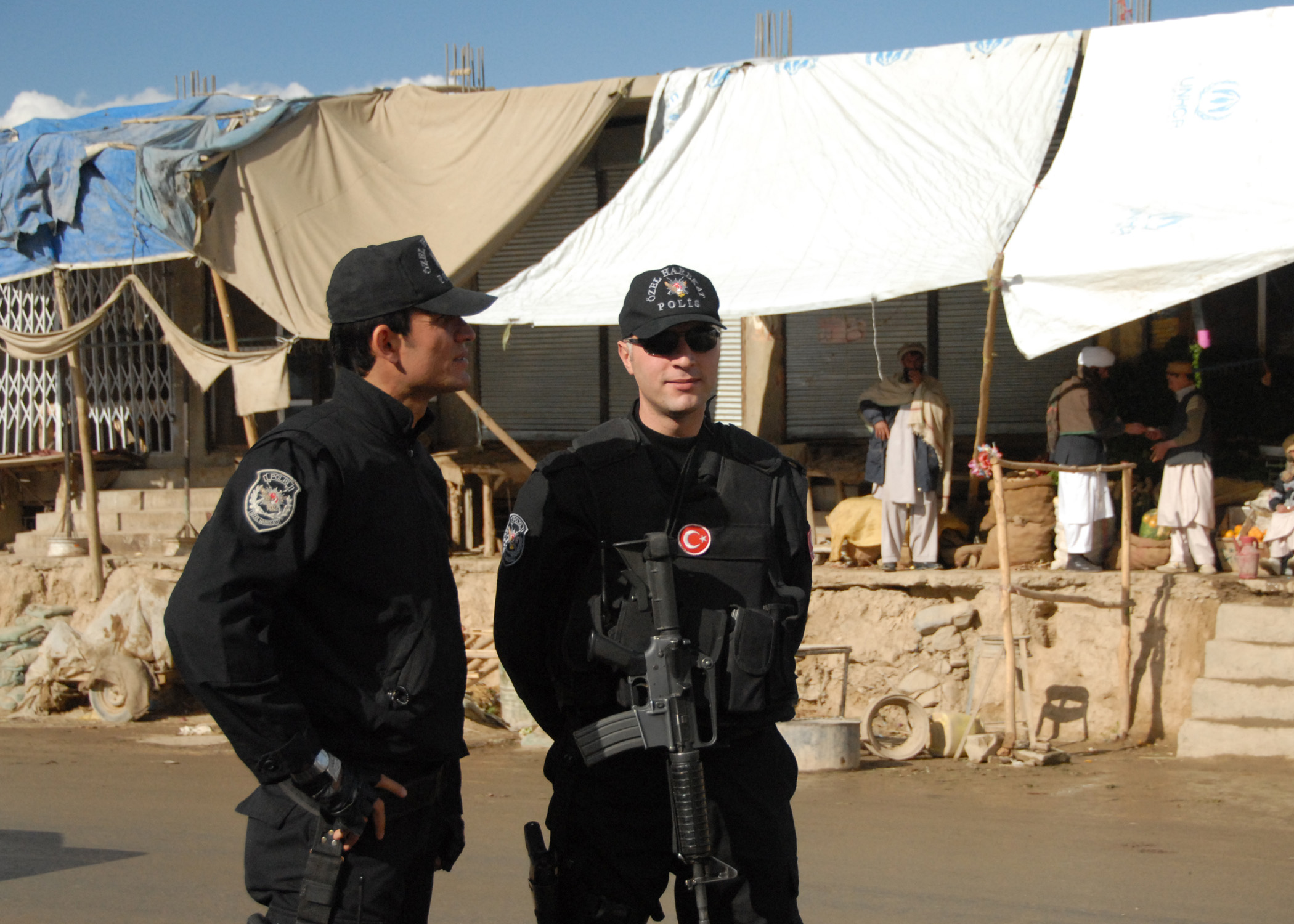
Turkish special forces police in Afghanistan (2008).

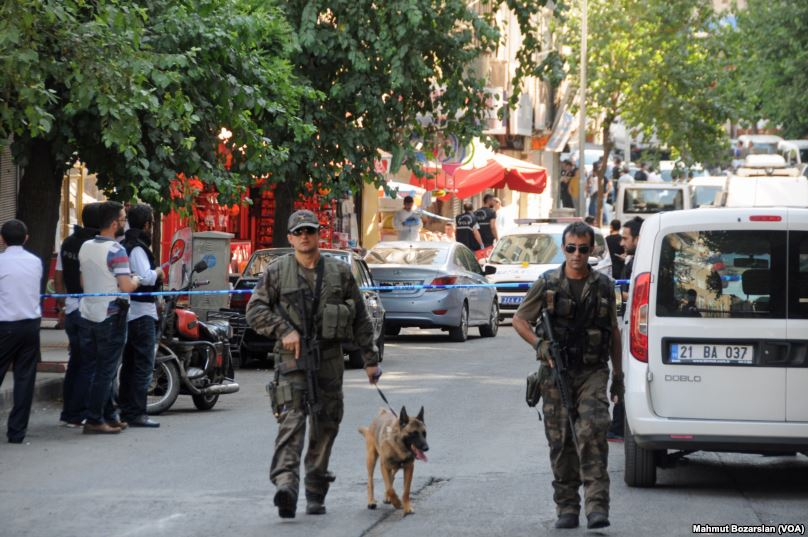
Police Special Operations Department Operators during Sur curfew.

The PÖH was founded in 1983 as "Special Operations Office" (Turkish: Özel Harekat Şube Müdürlüğü), under the command of Department of Public Security.

In larger cities like Ankara, Istanbul, and İzmir, "Special Operations Group Authorities "(Turkish: Özel Harekat Grup Amirlikleri) were organized in the same year.

As a result of changing conditions, in 1987, the office was transferred to the Anti-Terrorism and Operations Department under the name "Special Operations Branch" (Turkish: Özel Harekat Şubesi).

In 1993, the Special Operations Branch was promoted to a department and gained its current structuring.

İbrahim Şahin was head of the Department until being forced to resign in 1996 over the Susurluk scandal. Ayhan Çarkın was a notable member of the department in the 1990s.

== Organisation ==
The force consists of 22,000 personnel, more than a thousand of whom are women.

It is also deployed as part of the Turkish occupation of northern Syria.

== Training ==
To qualify for PÖH, an applicant must:

- Run the 2500m designated area with a backpack weighing 10 kg, under 15 minutes
- Have 50% minimum accuracy in pistol and rifle shooting
- Swim 150 m without stopping
- Be between ages 18 and 32
- Have graduated from police high school or university

In addition, a training simulation called TAKSİS is conducted by TÜBİTAK.

After 6 months of training, the applicant will receive a certificate officially identifying himself as an operator of PÖH.

== Tactics ==
Police Special Operation Department is one of a handful of security forces in the world which employs active front line female squad members in combat operations.

== Equipment ==
Model	Origin	Type	References
SIG Sauer P226	West Germany	Semi-automatic pistol	
Beretta 92	Italy	Semi-automatic pistol	
Canik TP9	Turkey	Semi-automatic pistol	
Sarsilmaz SAR 9	Turkey	Semi-automatic pistol	
Glock 17	Austria	Semi-automatic pistol	
Steyr M	Austria	Semi-automatic pistol	
Akdal MKA 1919	Turkey	Shotgun	
Armsan RS-A2	Turkey	Shotgun	
Heckler & Koch MP5	West Germany	Submachine gun	
IMI Micro Uzi	Israel	Submachine gun	
SAR 109T	Turkey	Submachine gun	
Heckler & Koch HK416	Germany	Rifle	
Heckler & Koch HK417	Germany	Rifle	
MKE MPT	Turkey	Rifle	
SAR 223	Turkey	Rifle	
SAR 56	Turkey	Rifle	
SIG Sauer SIG516	United States	Rifle	
Steyr AUG	Austria	Rifle	
Accuracy International AX50	United Kingdom	Rifle	
Accuracy International AWP	United Kingdom	Rifle	
Barrett M107	United States	Rifle	
KSR50	Turkey	Rifle	
LMT MWS 308	United States	Rifle	
Steyr SSG 69	Austria	Rifle	
Steyr SSG 08	Austria		
Milkor M32A1	South Africa	Grenade launcher	
PENN 37mm GL	United States	Grenade launcher	
FN Minimi	Belgium	Machine gun	
CS/LM8	China	Machine gun	
M60 machine gun	United States	Machine gun	
SAR 762 MT	Turkey	Machine gun	

== Vehicles ==
- Otokar Akrep
- Otokar Cobra
- Nurol Ejder
- BMC Kirpi
- T129 ATAK
