= Human Rights Foundation of Turkey =

The Human Rights Foundation of Turkey (abbr. HRFT; Turkish: Türkiye İnsan Hakları Vakfı, TİHV) is headquartered in Ankara. The organization is committed to treating torture survivors and documenting human rights violations in daily bulletins, monthly and annual special reports in Turkish and English languages.

== History and awards ==
The HRFT was established in 1990 on initiative of the Human Rights Association. Besides the HRA 32 individuals became the founders of the HRFT. Offices for the treatment of torture survivors have been set up in Ankara, Istanbul, İzmir, Adana and Diyarbakir. The HRFT does not accept money from institutions that contribute to human rights violations. The work of the HRFT is supported by a large number of volunteers and donations from individuals. Among the various national and international institutions that support the HRFT are: the UN, the Council of Europe, the Red Cross and Amnesty International.

== Treatment of Torture Victims ==
The treatment of torture survivors in the five centers (also called "representative offices") is free of charge. By the end of the year 2006 the number of treated torture survivors had reached 10,786. Statistics are presented in annual reports. Currently the reports since 1999 are available online, but so far only in Turkish.

== Documentation Center ==
The Documentation Center is in Ankara. Human rights violations are documented in daily bulletins, monthly, annual and special reports. The reports are published in Turkish and English. Since March 2007 the daily reports can be assessed on the homepage of the HRFT.

== International initiatives and awards ==
The foundation, a member organization of the International Rehabilitation Council for Torture Victims (IRCT), took the initiative to develop a uniform guideline in March 1996, following an international symposium on "Medicine and Human Rights" organized by the Turkish Medical Association in Adana. Seventy-five doctors, psychotherapists, lawyers, and human rights activists, representing forty organizations from fifteen different countries, worked on the document, known as the Istanbul Protocol. In addition to a number of national awards, the TIHV has also received several international awards for its work, with the European Human Rights Prize in 1998 being one of the most notable awards.

== Publications ==
- Annual Reports 1990–2006 (Turkish)
- Annual Reports 1990–1996 (English)
- Annual Reports 1997–2003, 2005 (translated)
- Annual Reports of the Treatment Centers (up to 2006 in Turkish)
- Annual Reports of the Treatment Centers (up to 2005 in English)

=== Special reports (books) ===
- File on Torture – Deaths in Detention Places or Prisons 12 September 1980 – 1994 (Turkish-English), second edition up to 1985
- The Report on the Health Services and Health Personnel's Problems in the Southeast (English)
- Freedom of Expression and Migration (Turkish)
- HRFT on Trial 1998 (Turkish)
- Manual on the Effective Investigation and Documentation of Torture and Other Cruel, Inhuman or Degrading Treatment or Punishment – Istanbul Protocol (Turkish-English)
- Torture and Impunity 2005 (Turkish-English)

== See also ==
- Human rights in Turkey
