= Sedat Bucak =

Turkish politician

Sedat Edip Bucak (born 31 October 1960 in Siverek) is a Kurdish politician and the leader of the Bucak tribe in Siverek, Şanlıurfa Province, Turkey. In the 1990s, he was a member of the Grand National Assembly of Turkey. He led the Bucak tribe in fighting the Kurdistan Workers' Party in the Turkey-PKK conflict. He survived the 1996 Susurluk car crash which led to the Susurluk scandal over links between police, politicians, the Turkish mafia and the Grey Wolves. In 2004 he was convicted of involvement in the Susurluk criminal gang, overturning a previous acquittal.

== Life ==
He was born in Siverek in 1960. His father is İsmail Hakkı.

He was elected to the Grand National Assembly of Turkey in 1991, representing Şanlıurfa for the True Path Party.

In October 1993 he held a meeting with Democracy Party (DEP) Siirt MP Zübeyir Aydar and Şırnak MP Selim Sadak. In this meeting, he declared that the state had done everything to destroy the fraternity between the Turkish and Kurdish nations. In December 1993 he organized the distribution of a leaflet entitled "Siverek Youth" in the district center of Siverek.

He was re-elected in the 1995 general election. He was the sole survivor of the Susurluk car crash in November 1996 which led to the Susurluk scandal. The other three crash victims were drug smuggler Abdullah Çatlı and his girlfriend Gonça Us, and the director of the police force in Istanbul Hüseyin Kocadağ. The crashed Mercedes belonged to Bucak. Bucak's parliamentary immunity was revoked, but it was reinstated when he was re-elected in 1999, putting the Susurluk-related trial on hold. In the 1990s he was also in charge of a village guards unit of the Bucak tribe which at the time had 10,000 men.

Bucak failed to win a seat in the 2002 general election, and as a result he lost his parliamentary immunity, and a case against him in relation to the Susurluk gang proceeded in December 2002. In 2004 he was convicted of involvement in the Susurluk criminal gang, overturning a previous acquittal. He was sentenced to one year in prison.
