= Abdullah Çatlı =

Turkish secret government agent, convicted drug trafficker and contract killer.

- Born: 1 June 1956; Nevşehir, Turkey
- Died: 3 November 1996 (aged 40); Susurluk, Turkey
- Resting place: Nevşehir Kaldırım Cemetery
- Occupations: MİT agent, drug trafficker
- Spouse: Meral Aydoğan (m. 1974–1996)

Abdullah Çatlı (1 June 1956 – 3 November 1996) was a Turkish secret government agent, convicted drug trafficker as well as a contract killer for the National Intelligence Organization (MİT). He led the Grey Wolves, the youth branch of the Nationalist Movement Party (MHP), during the 1970s. His death in the Susurluk car crash, while travelling in a car with state officials, revealed the depth of the state's complicity in organized crime in what became known as the Susurluk scandal. He was a hitman for the state, and was involved in the killings of suspected members of the Kurdistan Workers' Party (PKK) and the Armenian Secret Army for the Liberation of Armenia (ASALA).

== Career ==
Çatlı was born to a Turkish family in the city of Nevşehir. He grew up in the eponymous province in Central Anatolia. Çatlı was familiar with the views of the far-right MHP and Turkish ultra-nationalists. He first came to the fore in 1977 when he shot at a police officer during a fight with left-wingers.

=== 1978–1984 ===
Çatlı was responsible, along with Haluk Kırcı and several other MHP members, for the 9 October 1978 Bahçelievler Massacre in which seven university students, members of the Workers Party of Turkey (TIP), were murdered, in an attack on their apartment.

He is also said to have helped Mehmet Ali Ağca murder the left-wing newspaper editor Abdi İpekçi on 1 February 1979, in Istanbul. According to investigative journalist Lucy Komisar, Çatlı "reportedly helped organize Ağca's escape from an Istanbul military prison, and some have suggested Çatlı was even involved in the 1981 Pope's assassination attempt". In February 1982, he was caught with heroin in Switzerland, but managed to escape detention. In 1998 the magazine Le Monde diplomatique alleged that Abdullah Çatlı had organized the assassination attempt "in exchange for the sum of 3 million German mark" for the Grey Wolves. In 1985 in Rome, Çatlı declared to a judge "that he had been contacted by the BND, the German intelligence agency, [which had] promised him a nice sum of money if he implicated the Russian and Bulgarian services in the assassination attempt against the Pope".

Çatlı then went to France, where, under the alias of Hasan Kurtoğlu, he planned a series of attacks (18 in France and the rest in Yugoslavia, Lebanon, Germany, Canada, the US and Austria) on Armenian interests and on the ASALA, with help from MİT. These included the Alfortville Armenian Genocide Memorial Bombing on 3 May 1984 and the attempted murder of activist Ara Toranian.

=== 1984–1996 ===
The Turkish intelligence service (MIT) paid Çatlı in heroin, and he was eventually arrested in Paris on 24 October 1984 for drug trafficking. He was sentenced to seven years imprisonment and in 1988 he was handed over to Switzerland, where he was also wanted on charges of drug dealing. However, he escaped Bostadel prison in March 1990 with the assistance of the Grey Wolves. After he returned to Turkey, he appeared to have been recruited by the police, while also officially been sentenced to death in absentia by the Turkish authorities for several murders.

Turkish Prime Minister Tansu Çiller declared on 4 October 1993: "We know the list of businessmen and artists subjected to racketeering by the PKK and we shall be bringing their members to account." Beginning on 14 January 1994, almost a hundred people were kidnapped by commandos wearing uniforms and travelling in police vehicles and then killed somewhere along the road from Ankara to Istanbul. Çatlı demanded money from people who were on "Çiller's list", promising to get their names removed. One of his victims, Behçet Cantürk, was to pay ten million dollars, to which casino king Ömer Lütfü Topal added a further seventeen million. However, after receiving the money, he then went on to have them kidnapped and killed, and sometimes tortured beforehand.

According to Mehmet Eymür, a team led by Çatlı was responsible for the 1995 deaths of Iranian spies Lazım Esmaeili and Askar Simitko. Çatlı's fingerprint was also allegedly found on the drum of one of the machine guns used to assassinate Ömer Lütfü Topal. In 1996, Çatlı kidnapped the TV businessman Mehmet Ali Yaprak and demanded a ransom of four million deutschmarks.

== Death ==
Çatlı died in a car crash on 3 November 1996 in Susurluk, a town in the province of Balıkesir. Also killed in the crash were Hüseyin Kocadağ, the Director of the Police Academy in Istanbul and Gonça Us (Abdullah Çatlı's girlfriend). Sedat Bucak, a Member of Parliament of the True Path Party (DYP) for Şanlıurfa province and a Kurdish village guards leader, was the sole person to survive the crash. His militia, funded by the Turkish state, was active against the Kurdistan Workers' Party (PKK). The Susurluk scandal exposed the deep state in Turkey.

At the time of his death, Çatlı was a convicted fugitive, wanted for drug trafficking and murder but carried on him 6 different identifications, one of which was an official diplomatic passport under the name Mehmet Özbay. Alparslan Türkeş, the founder of the Grey Wolves and the Nationalist Movement Party (MHP), and a former deputy prime minister of Turkey, admitted to know Çatlı had been cooperated with Turkish authorities for the well-being of the state. The Interior Minister Mehmet Ağar signed many of the official documents he had, including the permit to carry firearms. After Çatlı died, Ağar initially claimed Çatlı was probably arrested by the Turkish authorities and had been brought to justice until it was discovered that the group had stayed in the same hotel for three days, and it was the same hotel in which Ağar also stayed. Following this, Ağar resigned. Çatli was also wanted by the Interpol for having escaped from a Swiss prison.

Muhsin Yazıcıoğlu from the far-right Great Union Party attended his funeral and Mehmet Ali Ağca sent flowers from prison in Rome. Annual memorial ceremonies are held at his grave, to which also the members of the Grey Wolves attend.

== Personal life ==
Çatlı's father was Ahmet Çatlıoğlu; the "-oğlu" suffix is a patronymic. Çatlı had a brother, Zeki. Abdullah Çatlı married his neighbor Meral Aydoğan on 10 August 1974. They had two daughters. His daughter Gökçen later wrote a biography of him, Babam Çatlı (2000).

== Bibliography ==
His daughter Gökçen wrote a biography, referring to diaries stretching back ten years, in order to correct alleged inaccuracies that were circulated after his death. Gökçen said "My father had his own understanding of justice. He was trying to achieve this justice with his group on behalf of his nation."

- Çatlı, Gökçen (2000). Babam Çatlı. Timaş. ISBN 975-362-573-1.

Another book was written by Soner Yalçın and Doğan Yurdakul, titled Reis: Gladio'nun Türk Tetikçisi ("The Chief: Gladio's Turkish Hitman").

=== Abdullah Çatlı in fiction ===
- Bruce Sterling's 2000 novel Zeitgeist includes a major character ("Mehmet Ozbey") loosely based on Çatlı.
