= Marmara Prison =

Prison in Istanbul, Turkey

Marmara Penitentiaries Campus
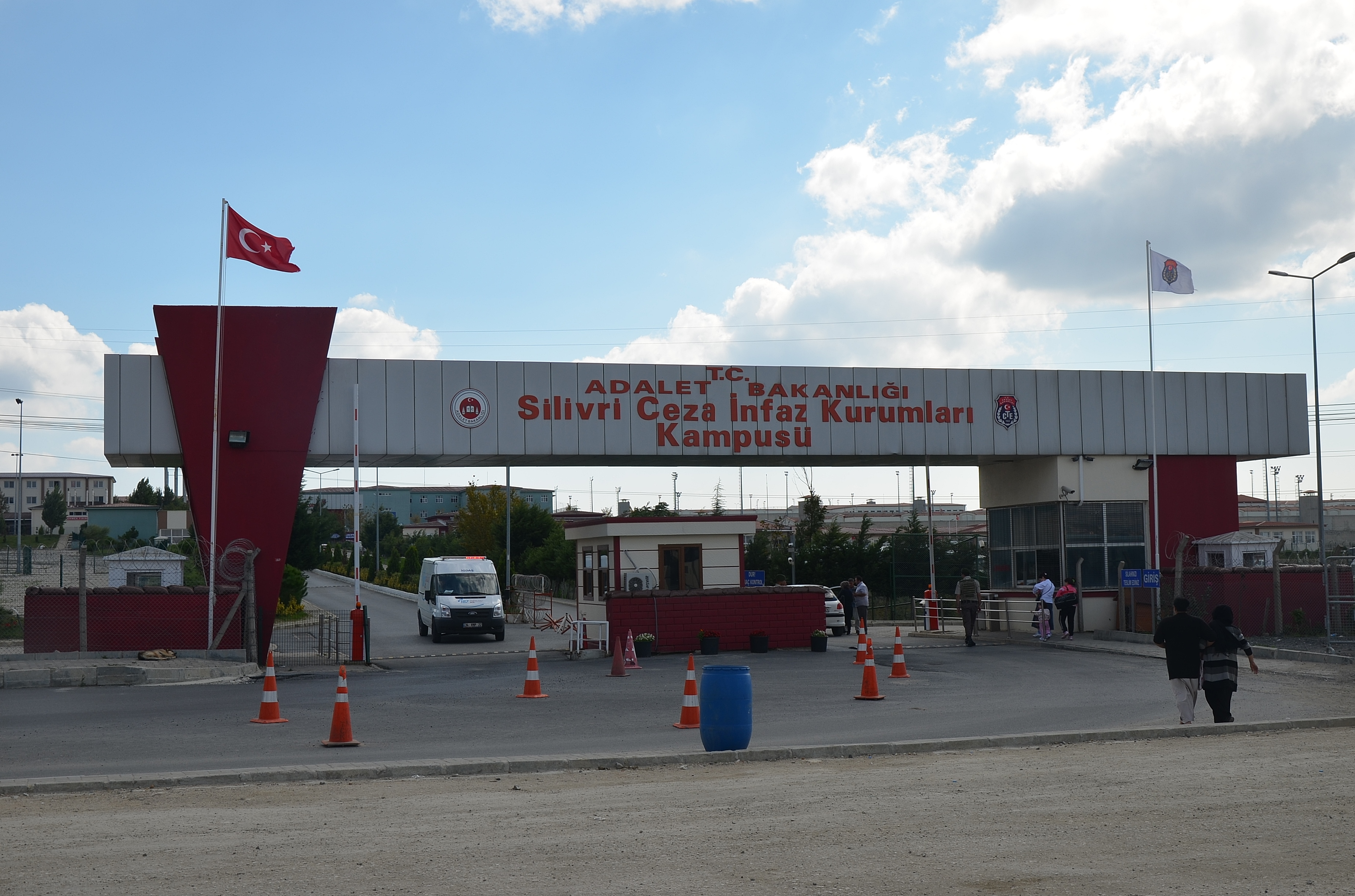
- Main entrance to the Marmara Prison.
- Interactive map of Marmara Penitentiaries Campus
- Location: Silivri, Istanbul; 41.08944°N 28.15358°E
- Status: Operational
- Security class: L-type
- Capacity: 10,904 as of 2008
- Opened: 2008
- Managed by: Directorate General of Penitentiaries, Ministry of Justice

Location of Marmara Prison in Istanbul province.

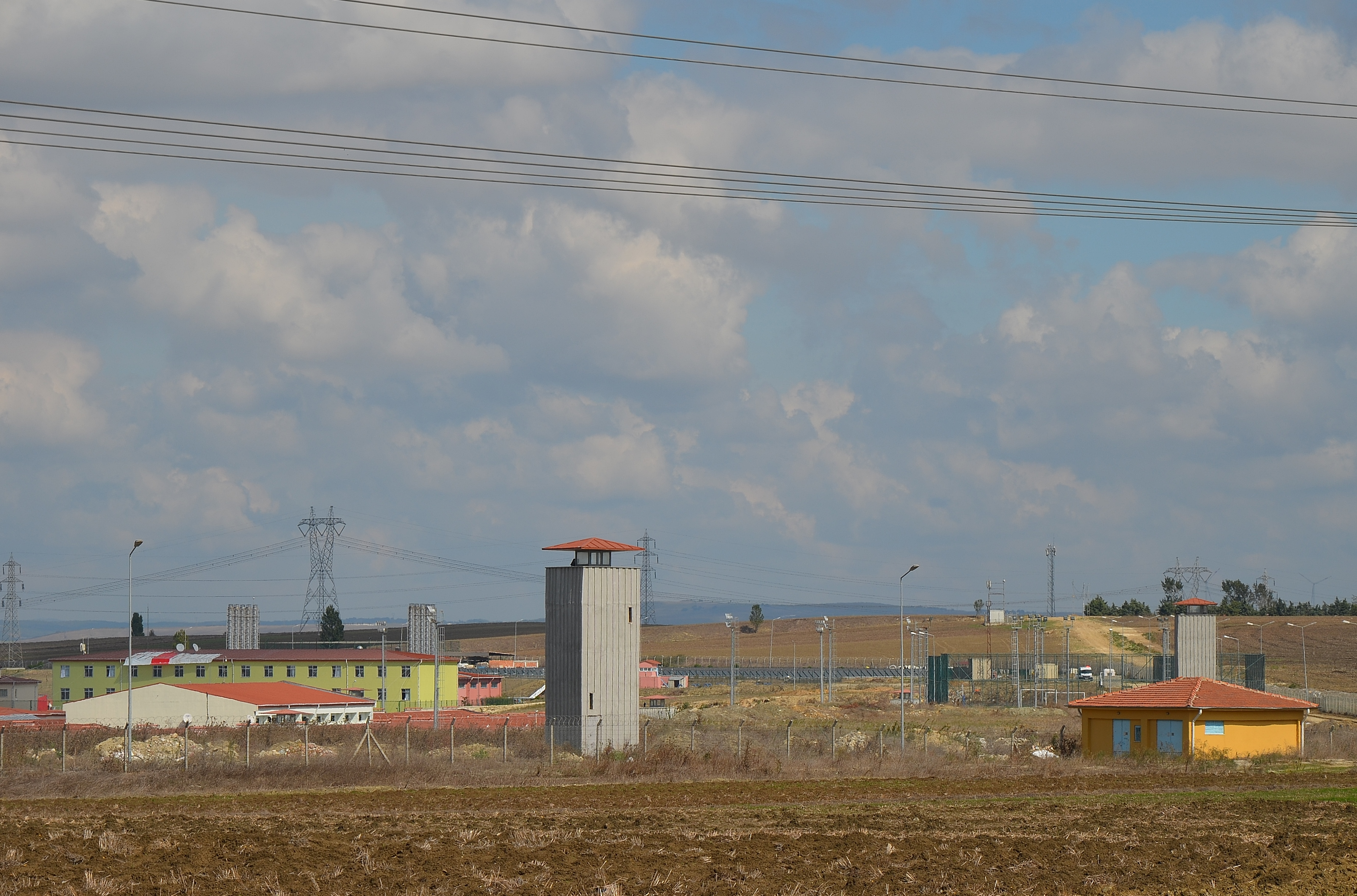
A view of Silivri Prison from outside.

Marmara Prison (Turkish: Marmara Cezaevi) or officially Marmara Penitentiaries Campus (Turkish: Marmara Ceza İnfaz Kurumları Kampüsü) formerly Silivri Prison is a high-security state correctional institution complex in the Silivri district of Istanbul Province in Turkey. Established in 2008, it is the country's most modern and Europe's largest penal facility.

As of June 5, 2008, a total of 96,760 defendants and convicts were detained in Turkey. 11,148 of them were held in ten correctional facilities of closed and open type within Istanbul Province. Following the opening of Silivri Prison, which has a capacity of nearly 11,000 inmates, the number of inmates in all Istanbul's prisons reached 15,910.

The prison complex is located 9 km (5.6 mi) west of Silivri on the highway E84, which connects the highway D.100 to the European Motorway O-3 (E80).

In 2022, the prison's name was changed to Marmara Prison.

== Prison complex ==
The need for a prison located far from the inhabited areas became necessary as Istanbul's biggest prison, the Bayrampaşa Prison, although built in the mid-1960s in the outskirts, remained within the city limits due to the city's rapid expansion. Another important reason was to abandon outdated facilities in accordance with the initiated prison reform for an effective penal system.

The construction of Silivri Prison began in 2005, and it took three years to complete. Covering an area of 437,000 m^{2} (4,700,000 sq ft) and stretching over 955,354 m^{2} (10,283,340 sq ft) land, the prison complex is composed of nine blocks, one open and eight L-type closed correctional institutions having a total capacity for 10,904 inmates.

Each of the eight L-type closed correctional blocks consists of 61 units for up to 21 inmates, four rooms for three and 40 single rooms. Single rooms or rooms for three are 12.45 m^{2} (134.0 sq ft), open courtyards are 65.19 m^{2} (701.7 sq ft), the intercommunity unit is 56.59 m^{2} (609.1 sq ft), and the unit that accommodates up to 21 people is 208.93 m^{2} (2,248.9 sq ft). Each section has an aerial input for TV, a radio, a small kitchen, a power socket and an alarm button to call for prison staff in case of emergency.

The nine blocks are separately reachable beyond the main entrance and are also independently administered by separate directors and their own staff. Each block has three separate gates, one for defendants and convicts, one for personnel, lawyers and visitors and another one for material.

The complex has a parking lot for 1,500 cars, a waiting lounge at the entrance for visitors, a health care institution, a mosque, six classrooms, eight vocational training workshops, two open-air sports grounds, an indoor sports center, a library, a shopping market, a day-care center, a restaurant, 500 staff accommodations and social facilities. Six power distribution units and two water stations supply the facility. For hearings with a high number of defendants or convicts of high security risk, two courtrooms, office rooms for judges and prosecutors are also available inside the campus.

Around 17,000 people including 2,000 service people and 1,500 visitors sojourn in the complex daily. It is reported that the cost of the construction was around 100 million TRL (approx. US$67 million at the time, and around US$6.8 million in 2022).

In 2022, the prison's name was changed to Marmara Prison.

== Security ==
The prison, which employs around 134 staff, is equipped with state-of-the-art security devices at the checkpoints. At the entrances and exits, there are eye-sensitive doors and x-ray devices for biometric electronic scan.

Every person, even prison director, prosecutor or visitor, is screened by x-ray devices before entering the waiting hall. The device is monitored on two separate displays. Additionally, high-resolution images of the irises of the eyes of the people, prison personnel's once only and the visitors' each time, are recorded for authentication by iris recognition.

A picture of every inmate is fixed on the outer wall of his cell. Inmates can lock up the door of their cells from the inside to protect themselves against attacks. The cell door can be opened with guard's key. The inmates can also alarm the prison security by pushing a button on the cell wall.

For the outdoor security of the facility, gendarmerie units are responsible.

== Inmates ==
With the establishment of modern correctional facilities in Turkey, defendants and convicts are detained in different prisons classified after the type of crime. In Silivri Prison, a separate wing is assigned to male criminals between 18 and 21 years of age convicted of juvenile delinquency other than of drug-related crime. The penal reform aiming at improvement of activities like education and training, penological rehabilitation and psychosocial rehabilitation services is fulfilled in Silivri Prison.

Right after the completion of the complex, around 3,500 of the 5,500 inmates of the 40-year-old Bayrampaşa Prison were transferred to Silivri. The relocation of the defendants and the convicts charged for crimes like drug offense, theft, murder or robbery started on June 6, 2008.

== Ergenekon trial ==
The Ergenekon trials, relating to the Ergenekon organization, an alleged clandestine network formed by former and active military and security officers, politicians, journalists, academics and mafia leaders, who allegedly attempted to overthrow the government, is being held since October 20, 2008 in the purpose-built Silivri Prison courtroom.

For security reasons, Silivri Prison Complex was chosen to host the Ergenekon trial. In order to avoid the risky and time-consuming transportation of the confined suspects to a courthouse in 80 km (50 mi) away Istanbul, the hearings are held at the courtroom inside the prison complex.

However, as the number of defendants and hence the number of lawyers attending the hearings increased in process of the trial, the existing courtroom became unsatisfactory. In June 2009, the prison's sport hall was converted for the term of the trial into a maxi courtroom with a capacity for 753 people including defendants, witnesses, lawyers, spectators and the press members. A box with railing, sufficiently large for 180 defendants, is situated in the middle of the courtroom.

Meanwhile, the former courtroom, with an original capacity for 203 people, was also enlarged to hold 405 people.

== Popular culture ==
Among the Turkish youth, "Silivri is cold" (Turkish: Silivri soğuktur) is a humorous phrase used to indicate a person's concern of expressing critical opinions towards Turkish president Recep Tayyip Erdoğan due to censorship in the country and Article 299 of the Turkish Penal Code. The complex is famous for housing many political prisoners, many of whom are journalists, human rights activists, and lawyers.

== Notable inmates ==
=== Arrested in the Ergenekon and Sledgehammer investigations (2007–2013) ===
- Mustafa Levent Göktaş (born 1959), retired Colonel of Special Forces Command
- Veli Küçük (born 1944), retired Brigadier General of Turkish Gendarmerie
- Doğu Perinçek (born 1942), leader of the Turkish Workers Party
- İbrahim Şahin (born 1956), retired police chief
- İlker Başbuğ (born 1943), former Chief of the General Staff of Turkey
- Ali Yasak (born 1956), organized crime boss, involved in the Susurluk scandal
- Barış Pehlivan (born 1983), journalist and author
- Tuncay Özkan (born 1966), journalist, writer and politician of CHP
- Soner Yalçın (born 1966), journalist and writer
- Mustafa Balbay (born 1960), journalist and politician of CHP
- Nedim Şener (born 1966), journalist
- Ahmet Şık (born 1970), journalist and politician of HDP (arrested again in 2016)
- Hurşit Tolon (born 1942), retired General, former commander of the First Army
- Çetin Doğan (born 1940), retired General, former commander of the First Army
- Özden Örnek (1943-2018), retired Admiral, former Commander of the Turkish Naval Forces
- İbrahim Fırtına (born 1941), retired General, former Commander of the Turkish Air Forces
- Engin Alan (born 1945), retired Lieutenant General, former Special Forces Commander
- Mehmet Haberal (born 1944), surgeon
- Yalçın Küçük (born 1938), academic

=== Arrested after the 2016 coup d'état attempt ===
- Hüseyin Avni Mutlu (born 1956), former civil servant and Governor of Istanbul Province
- Hüseyin Çapkın (born 1951), former police chief of Istanbul Province
- Ahmet Altan (born 1950), journalist and novelist
- Mehmet Altan (born 1953), economist and author
- Kadri Gürsel (born 1961), journalist
- Deniz Yücel (born 1973), German journalist
- Peter Steudtner (born 1971), German human rights activist
- Osman Kavala (born 1957), businessman and philanthropist

=== Arrested during the 2025 Turkish protests ===
- Ekrem İmamoğlu (born 1970), mayor of Istanbul and leading opposition politician
- Ümit Özdağ (born 1961), opposition politician
- Murat Ongun (born 1975), spokesperson and political advisor of Ekrem İmamoğlu
- Joakim Medin (born 1984), Swedish journalist and writer

== See also ==
- Arrest of Ekrem İmamoğlu
