= Coups d'état in Turkey =

Turkish coup d'état may refer to illegal or constitutional military takeovers or takeover attempts in Turkey. There have been several.

From the founding of the Turkish Republic until 2016, the Turkish military was very involved in Turkish politics. The army was strongly Kemalist and considered one of its roles to be the ultimate guardian of Atatürk's reforms including secularism, and of cooperation with the Western world generally. The Turkish constitutions of 1924, 1961, and 1982 formally specified that the army's role was to protect Turkey against internal as well as external threats. The army was popular and prestigious as the guarantor of the Turkish state and of Turkish multiparty democracy (after its effective establishment following World War II).

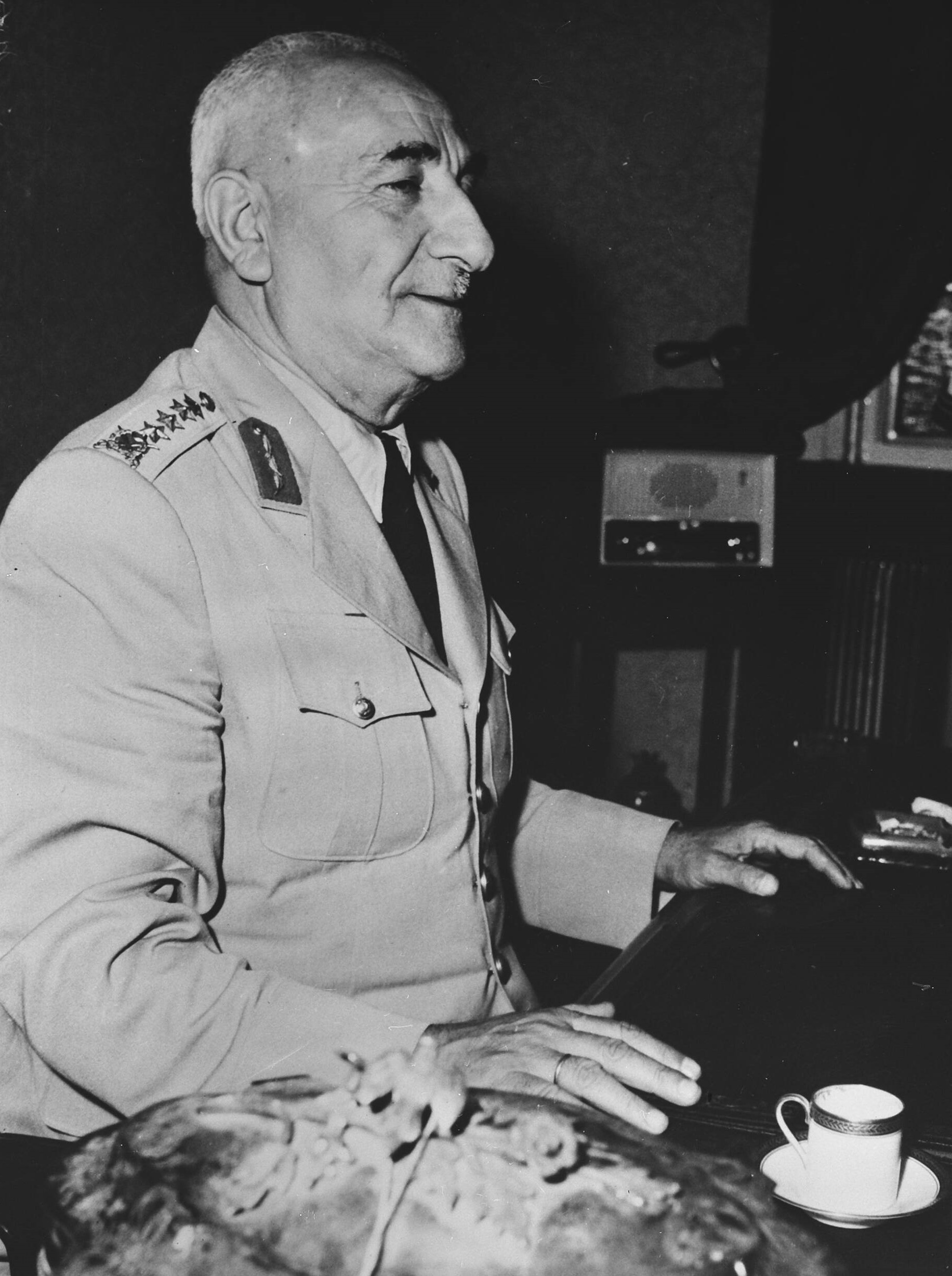
Cemal Gürsel, leader of the successful 1960 coup

The army first exercised its reserve power in the 1960 Turkish coup d'état. There had been economic stagnation, a perceived rise in political Islam, and in 1960, unrest and protests against the ruling Democrat Party. Some Army officers, saying they feared further unrest and the decline of Kemalism and democracy, staged a successful coup. The other successful coup d'états happened in 1971, 1980, and 1997.

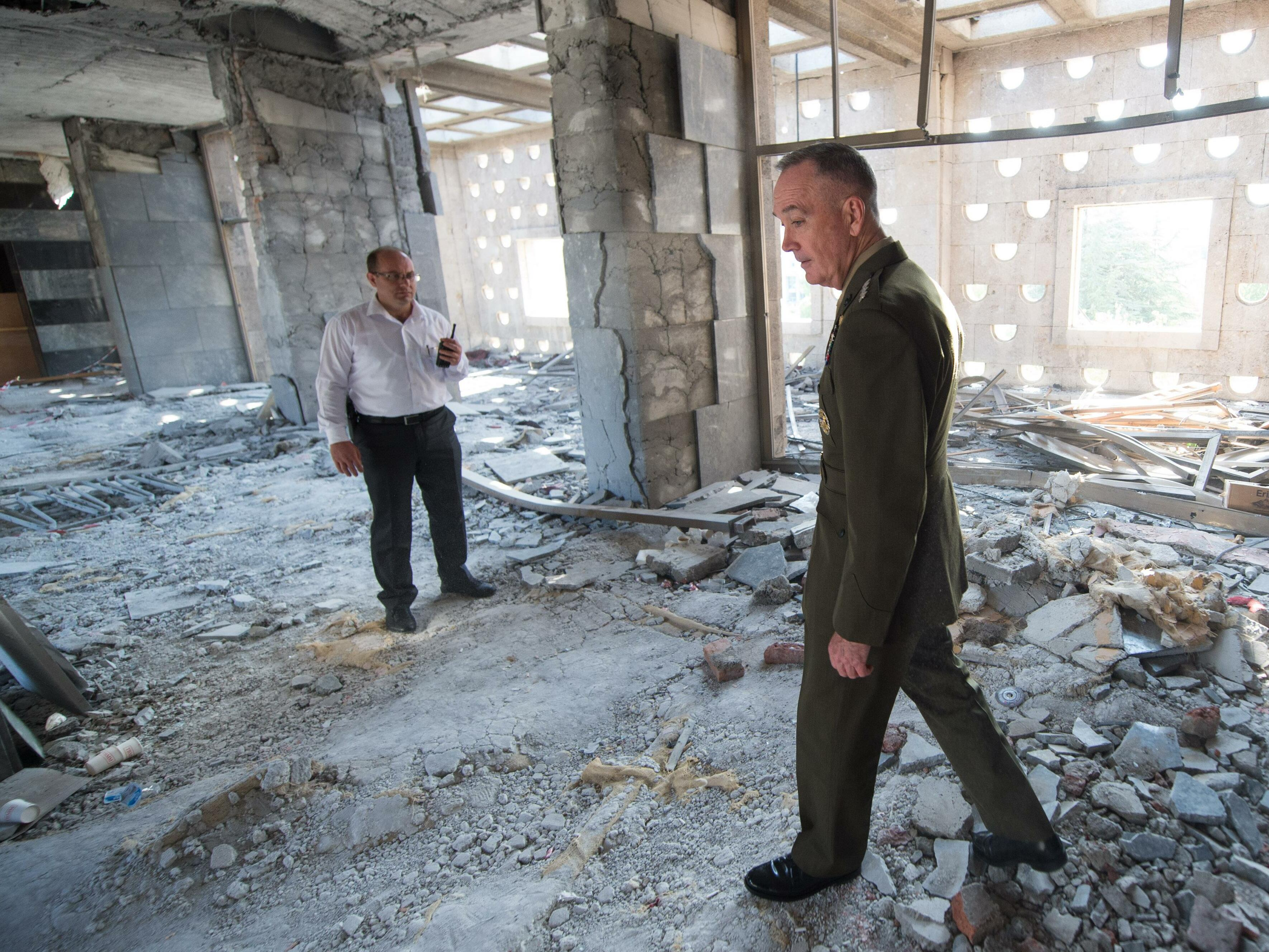
Air missile damage to the Turkish Parliament building after the failed 2016 coup.

Turkey was soon returned to civilian rule, but until the failed 2016 coup attempt, the army was effectively not under civilian control, and either governed Turkey directly at times or loomed as a threat to the civilian governments that did. Elements of the army staged or attempted several interventions, either coups or ultimatums backed by threat of a coup, to force the state to act more in accordance with the wishes of the army, or that portion of the army staging the intervention. Each coup or threat has been presented as an intervention to restore democratic order, justice, and national unity. Whether or not each coup or threat, or any of them, was justified is subject to debate.

In 2002, the Justice and Development Party (AKP) came to power, and party leader Recep Tayyip Erdoğan soon became the strongman of Turkey. As well as being autocratic, Erdoğan was more pro-Islamist than any previous leader of the Republic. The first showdown came in 2007 with the E-memorandum, when the army hinted another intervention into civilian politics since the AKP government was not doing its best to uphold republicanism and secularism. Erdoğan and the AKP won the political crisis, and in an alliance with the Gülenist movement, purged the military of secularist officers.

In 2016, a small faction of 8500 soldiers in the army claimed that they attempted to overthrow the government. The Turkish government claimed in less than 2 hours that Gülenist elements in the army were the instigators. Historian Michael Rubin compared the coup attempt to the previous ones called this one as "Turkey's Reichstag Fire". After the failed coup attempt Erdoğan conducted a massive purge of the armed forces, which are no longer considered an independent force in Turkish politics or a threat to the government, and back under civilian control.

== Turkish coups d'état ==
- 1960 Turkish coup d'état
- 1971 Turkish military memorandum
- 1980 Turkish coup d'état
- 1997 Turkish military memorandum

== Attempts and uprisings ==
- 1962 Turkish coup d'état attempt
- 1963 Turkish coup d'état attempt
- 1969 Turkish coup d'état attempt
- 1971 Turkish coup d'état attempt
- 2007: E-memorandum
- 2016 Turkish coup d'état attempt

== Cases associated with coups ==
- 1925: Law on the Maintenance of Order
- 1926: İzmir plot
- 1958: Nine Officers Plot
- 1961: 21 October Protocol
- 1979 Turkish military memorandum
- 1993 alleged Turkish military coup
- 2008–2016 Ergenekon trials
  - Sarıkız, Ayışığı, Yakamoz and Eldiven
  - Sledgehammer (alleged coup plan)
  - Operation Cage Action Plan
- 2021 Montreux Declaration, by 103 retired admirals but likened by some to a military memorandum
- Republican People's Party absolute nullity crisis judicial coup

== See also ==
- Politics of Turkey
- Deep state in Turkey
- Conspiracy theories in Turkey
- Human rights in Turkey

=== Ottoman coups d'état ===
- 1446: Buçuktepe rebellion
- 1512: Ascension of Selim I
- 1589: Beylerbeyi incident
- 1618: First Deposition of Mustafa I
- 1622: Regicide of Osman II
- 1623: Second Deposition of Mustafa I
- 1632: Janissary rebellion
- 1648: Regicide of Ibrahim
- 1687: Deposition of Mehmed IV
- 1703: Edirne Incident
- 1730: Patrona Halil rebellion
- 1807-1808: Ottoman coups of 1807–1808
- 1826: Auspicious Incident
- 1859: Kuleli Incident
- 1876 Ottoman coup d'état
- 1876: Deposition of Murad V
- February 1878: Retraction of the Ottoman Constitution
- May 1878: Çırağan Palace Incident
- 1881: Yildiz Trials
- 1895 Sublime Porte memorandum
- 1896 Ottoman coup d'état attempt
- 1897 Ottoman Syria plot
- 1903 Ottoman coup d'état attempt
- 1908: Young Turk Revolution
- 1909: 31 March Incident
- 1912 Ottoman coup d'état
- 23 January 1913: Raid on the Sublime Porte
- 25 January 1913 conspiracy
- March 1913 conspiracy
- June 1913: Ottoman coup d'état attempt
- 1919: Telegram War
- 1920: Retraction of the Ottoman Constitution
- 1922: Abolition of the Ottoman sultanate
