= Mehmet Baransu =

Turkish journalist and author

- Born: 7 March 1977 (age 49)
- Occupations: Journalist; Author
- Employer: Taraf
- Awards: Sedat Simavi Journalism Award (2009)

Mehmet Baransu (born 1977) is a Kurdish journalist and author from Turkey. He is a correspondent for Taraf, and previously worked for Aksiyon (1997–2000). He is the winner of a 2009 Sedat Simavi Journalism Award. Known for investigating the Turkish military, he reported on the "Cage Action Plan" which became part of the Ergenekon trials, and published documents in January 2010 revealing "Balyoz" ("Sledgehammer"), a plan for a coup that was supposedly hatched by Turkish military officers in 2003. In January 2010, in connection with Sledgehammer, Baransu delivered a suitcase to the Istanbul Chief Public Prosecutor's Office a suitcase containing evidence of the coup plot such as CDs, tapes, printed documents, and handwritten notes. The Sledgehammer plot involved plans to bomb two mosques in Istanbul, attack a military museum and blame it on religious extremists, and attack a Turkish plane and blame it on Greece. Three hundred and thirty-one of the 365 suspects were sentenced to prison on 21 September 2012, while the remaining 34 were acquitted. Three retired generals were sentenced to life in prison on charges of "attempting to overthrow the government by force," but their terms were later reduced to 20 years. Turkey's Constitutional Court ruled in June 2014 that the rights of most of the convicted suspects had been violated, and ordered the immediate release of 236 of them. The rest were released later. A new trial began on 3 November 2014. Reports released in December 2014 and February 2015 claimed that some of the evidence in the case was fabricated.

In 2010 it was revealed that the phones of both Baransu and his wife, Esra Baransu, had been tapped by the Turkish Gendarmerie on false pretences. The Gendarmerie had obtained warrants for the phone taps by falsely representing the IMEI code numbers of the Baransus' phones as belonging to fictional Kurdistan Workers' Party (PKK) suspects. In 2011 five military officers were each sentenced to five years in jail for these actions. In 2011 a voice recording posted online, allegedly by a military official, said that Baransu should be killed as a warning to others.

His books include Mösyö: Hanefi Avcı’nın Yazamadıkları (2010), which alleges that former police chief Hanefi Avcı had committed torture and developed connections with the Devrimci Karargâh group, and that Avcı had published his book on Ergenekon to try to ward off arrest. His 2012 book Pirus alleged plans to assassinate Chief of the General Staff Hilmi Özkök to permit a 2004 coup, and suggested that the plans were foiled when US officials found out about them.

== Early life and education ==
Baransu studied in the United States for over three years, working on a thesis on child murders.

== Media career ==
=== "Sledgehammer" plot ===
In 2014, Turkey's highest court ruled that the officers convicted in connection with the "Sledgehammer" plot had not received a fair trial.

On 1 March 2015, in the wake of allegations by the ruling party that the "Sledgehammer" documents were forgeries, Baransu was detained in his home in the Kağıthane district of Istanbul. Meanwhile police counter-terrorist teams searched his home for ten or twelve hours (reports differed), and seized some documents. During the months preceding this detention, he had been detained several times by police.

== Arrest ==
The next day he was arrested and charged with obtaining the secret documents relating to the “Sledgehammer” plan. The Guardian described the allegations against Baransu as “extraordinary.” He faced up to eight years in prison. The exact charge leveled against Baransu was that he had formed a criminal organization" and procured, publicized and then destroyed “documents related to the state’s interests at home and abroad.”

== Reactions ==
In an article in the daily newspaper Cumhuriyet, Ahmet Altan, founding editor of Taraf, defended Baransu, writing, “Since when have coup plans been classified as ‘documents related to state security’ and ‘state knowledge that needs to be kept classified?’ I am the person who published the [Sledgehammer] story, the one who decided it needed to be published, the one who didn't doubt for a moment that Sledgehammer was a coup plot." Nina Ognianova of the Committee for the Protection of Journalists called for Baransu's release, saying: “A journalist’s job is to report on developments in the public interest, and it is absurd that a journalist should be prosecuted for obtaining documents which, in any case, were shared with authorities.”

In an article headlined “What lies behind Mehmet Baransu’s arrest?”, Baransu's colleague Yasemin Çongar noted claims “that Baransu drafted fake documents and committed military espionage.” Çongar asked: “Would a journalist really submit the documents he holds to the state if he made them or thinks they are fake? Would a journalist really submit the documents and evidence to the state and publish these items, if his purpose is to sell these documents and military secrets to other states?” Çongar added that Baransu apparently “was not arrested because of these rumors” but because he was “being accused of acquiring information that should have been kept confidential in the interests of the state and national security under Article 327 of the Turkish Penal Code (TCK). Should we now assume that coup preparations are legal and that they should be kept confidential for national security? Should we argue that journalists should simply ignore the right of the people to be properly informed and stay away from documents and evidence showing illegal activities conducted within the state? Does this not mean giving up on journalism? Does this not mean giving up on Article 3 of the Press Law and Article 28 of the Constitution?” Çongar further stated that “When I read the documents and listened to the CDs that served as the basis of those reports, I concluded that there was actually a coup plan devised in the army in 2003. I still hold this view.”

The group Article 19 condemned Baransu's arrest and called for his immediate release. Article 19 had previously expressed concern about the arrest of journalists working for the newspaper Zaman, which, like Taraf, it noted, "play an important role in investigating alleged government corruption and maintaining a diversity of voices in the Turkish press." The International Press Institute (IPI) also condemned Baransu's detention. "This case appears to be an effort to target Mr. Baransu for the materials he published, in violation of the right to press freedom," IPI Director of Advocacy and Communications Steven M. Ellis said. "Given the circumstances of the case against him, there appears to be no legitimate reason to detain Mr. Baransu while the investigation proceeds and we call on Turkish authorities to release him immediately." Meanwhile Baransu faced a possible 52-year prison sentence "for his 2013 revelations of an 'action plan' developed by Turkey's National Security Council targeting the Fethullah Gulen religious movement."

== Jail sentences ==
On Sunday, 19 July, Baransu was sentenced by the court board to 19 years and 6 months in prison for three crimes. For "violating privacy" he was sentenced to two years in prison; for "disclosing classified information" he was sentenced to four years in prison; and for "membership of an armed terrorist organisation" he was sentenced to 13 years and six months in prison.

Baransu has been held behind bars since 2015, having also been convicted that year of "insulting the President" and sentenced to 10 months in prison on 30 June 2015 Recep Tayyip Erdoğan. Then, on 2 February 2016, he received an additional sentence of 11 months and 20 days for his criticism of Hakan Fidan, head of the National Intelligence Organization. While imprisoned, he was tried for allegedly leaking secret documents of the state in an article titled "The Decision to Finish Gülen Was Made in 2004". This was the article where he exposed the planned coup against the Turkish Government. The prosecutor for the case demanded 50 years and 6 months in prison for Baransu.

== See also ==
Gülen movement

== Bibliography ==
- Mehmet Baransu – Tuncay Opçin (2012). Pirus (Devşirme Orduların Son Savaşı). Karakutu Yayınları. ISBN 9786051200323.
- Mehmet Baransu (2010). Karargah. Karakutu Yayınları. ISBN 9786051200040.
- Mehmet Baransu (2010). Mösyö: Hanefi Avcı'nın Yazamadıkları. Karakutu Yayınları. ISBN 9786051200163.
