= 2007 Turkish presidential election =

Election of Abdullah Gül

- 20 August 2007 (first round); 24 August 2007 (second round); 28 August 2007 (third round)

550 members of the Grand National Assembly 276 votes needed to win
- Turnout: 81.45% ▼15.46pp
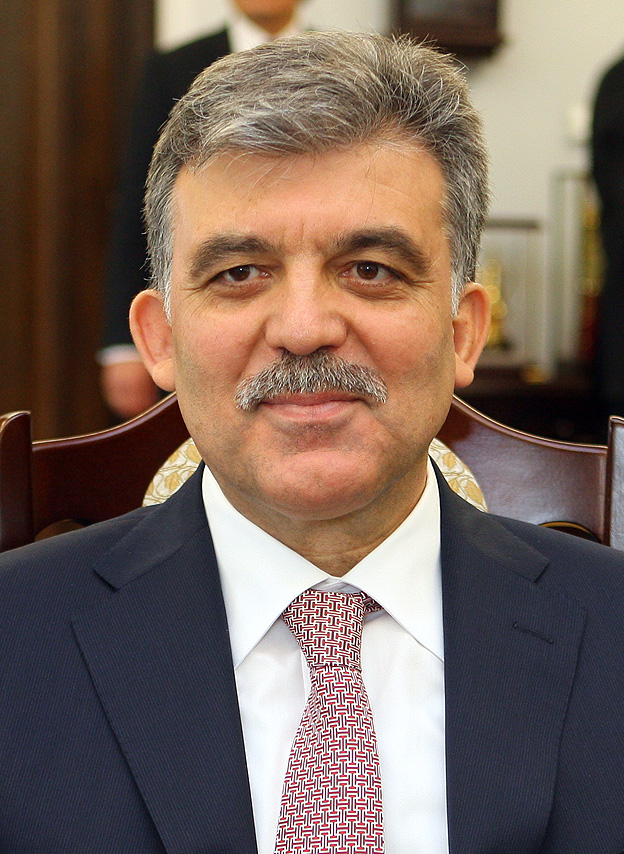

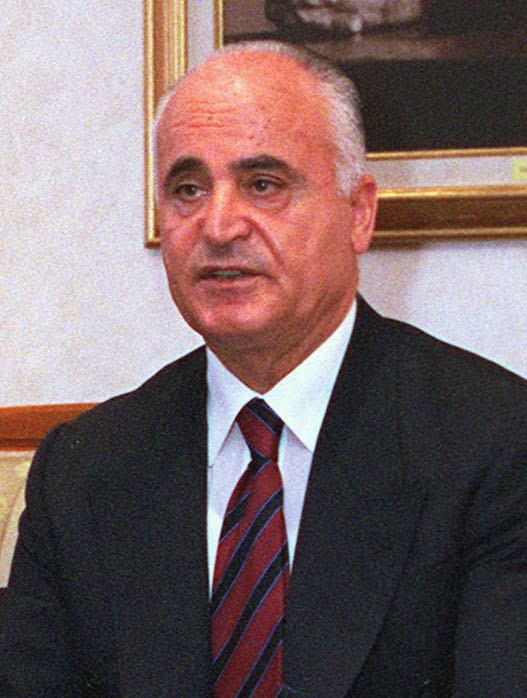

Candidate	Abdullah Gül	Sabahattin Çakmakoğlu	Hüseyin Tayfun İçli
Party	AK Party	MHP	DSP
Electoral vote	339	70	13
Percentage	80.33%	16.59%	3.08%
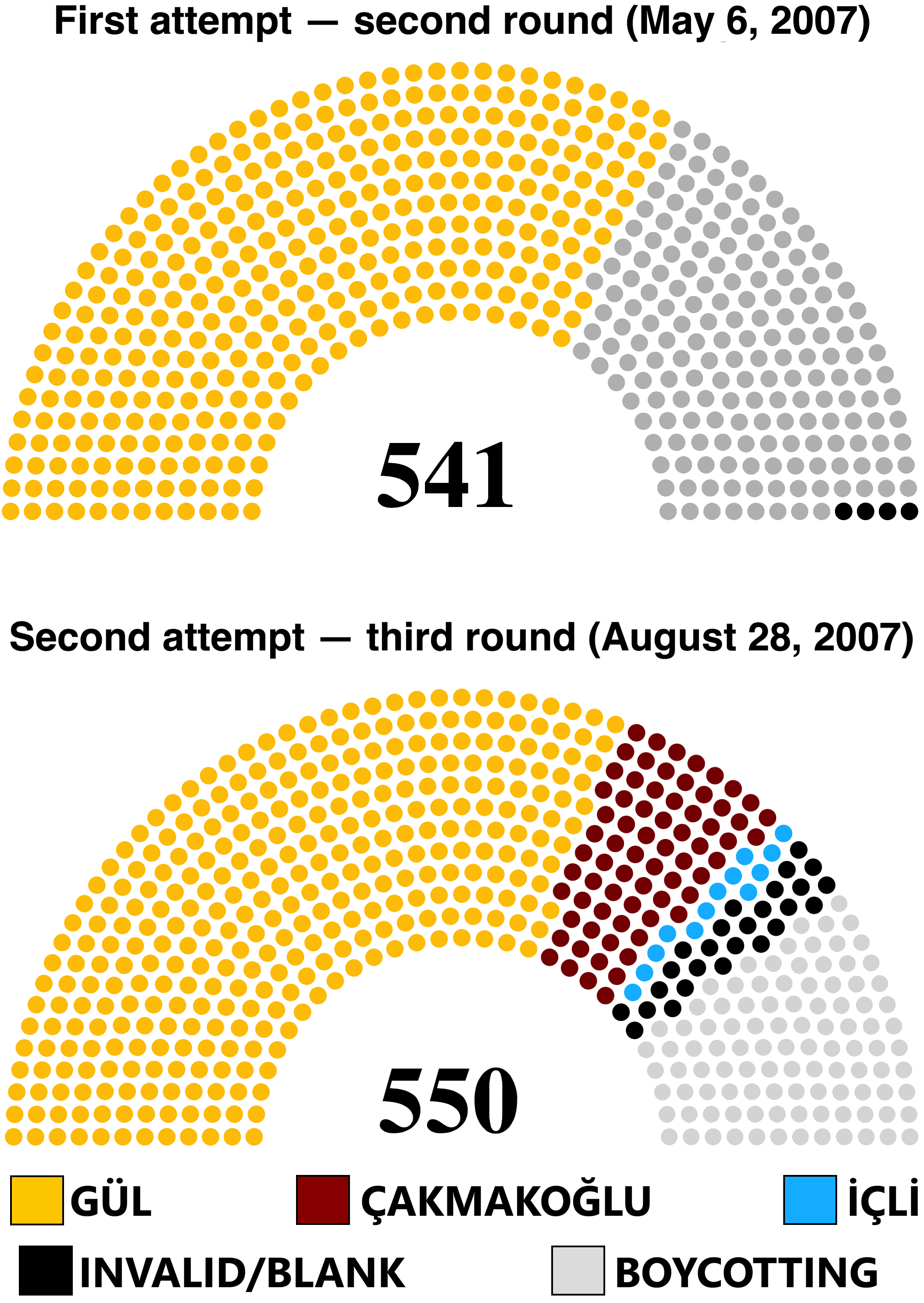
President before election
Ahmet Necdet Sezer
Independent
Elected President
Abdullah Gül
AK Party

The 2007 Turkish presidential election refers to two attempts to elect the country's 11th president, to succeed Ahmet Necdet Sezer. The most likely candidate for president was Abdullah Gül. Turkey's presidential office is regarded as the guardian of the country's secular system; the fact that Gül's wife wears the Islamic headscarf, as well as his own history in political Islam, turned the elections into a political crisis.

The first attempt consisted of the first rounds on 27 April and its repeat on 6 May after Turkey's constitutional court annulled the first round on 27 April. The constitutional court decided that a quorum of two-thirds was necessary, which was impossible without opposition support. Both first rounds were almost entirely boycotted by opposition MPs to disable the voting to start. Therefore, the ruling Justice and Development Party (AK Party) was unsuccessful in electing its candidate, foreign minister Abdullah Gül. AKP then called a snap election which was held on 22 July 2007. The general elections saw it returned to government with a larger proportion of the vote. Subsequently, Gül was renominated and was finally elected in the third round of the second attempt of presidential election. The first round of this voting was on 20 August, while a second was on 24 August and a third was on 28 August. There was a quorum this time, since some opposition parties, most importantly the Nationalist Movement Party (MHP), did not boycott the election.

== Procedure ==
The presidential vote is held among MPs in parliament by secret ballot. A candidate requires a two-thirds majority (367 votes) to be elected in the first two rounds. If there is no clear winner before the third round, the winning threshold is dropped to a simple majority (276 votes). If there is still no winner, the two candidates with the most votes from the third round progress to a runoff election, where the simple majority rule still applies. In the event of no clear winner among the two, the Constitution states that a snap general election must be called to overcome the parliamentary deadlock. In addition, the main opposition party, CHP argued that a quorum of two-thirds was necessary while the ruling party, AK Party claimed that it was not necessary. Later, the constitutional court ruled that a quorum of two-thirds was necessary.

== First election attempt: April–May 2007 ==
=== Electors ===
Parties	Seats	
Parties	Elected	At dissolution
Justice and Development Party (Adalet ve Kalkınma Partisi, AKP)	363	351
Republican People's Party (Cumhuriyet Halk Partisi (CHP)	178	151
Motherland Party (Anavatan Partisi, ANAP)	0	20
True Path Party (Doğru Yol Partisi, DYP) changed its name to Democratic Party (Demokrat Parti, DP) on May 27, 2007	0	5
Social Democratic People's Party (Sosyaldemokrat Halk Partisi, SHP)	0	1
People's Ascent Party (Halkın Yükselişi Partisi, HYP)	0	1
Young Party (Genç Parti, GP)	0	1
Independents (Bağımsız)	9	11
Vacant Seats (Boş)	—	9
Total	550	541

=== Candidates ===
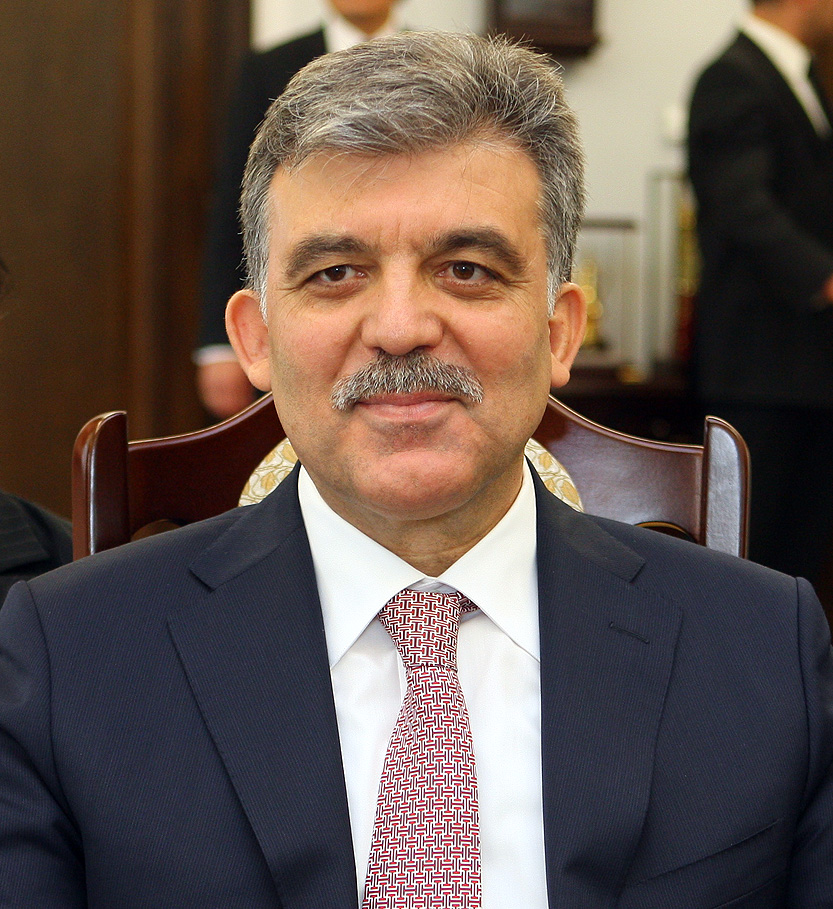
Abdullah Gül, former Prime Minister, Deputy Prime Minister and Foreign Minister of Turkey from the Justice and Development Party (AK Party)

Abdullah Gül's candidacy was announced by Erdoğan on 24 April 2007 while calling Gül as his brother. He was the official candidate of the Justice and Development Party, thus making him the strongest candidate to be the 11th president of Turkey. During his campaign, he met the leaders of parties represented in the Parliament, except Genç Party leader Cem Uzan. None of the parties said that they would vote for Gül in the elections. After the Supreme Court's rule on the election method, his chance to become the next president decreased since the support of Justice and Development Party had become not enough to get elected. On 6 May 2007, Foreign Minister Abdullah Gül withdrew his candidacy after the Parliament failed to achieve a quorum for a second time.

Ersönmez Yarbay was another candidate from the Justice and Development Party. He announced his candidacy since he believed that there should be a second candidate in the elections. By his candidacy, he protested the election method of the president, as he alleged that Erdoğan would decide the next president on his own. However, he withdrew his candidacy before the start of presidential voting.

==== Republic Protests ====
On 14 April 2007, two days before the start of the nominations announcement for the presidential elections, over one million protesters marched in the centre of Ankara, chanting slogans such as "Turkey is secular, and it will remain secular", and "We do not want an imam for President" to protest against the possibility of Prime Minister Erdoğan or another member of the Justice and Development Party standing in the presidential elections. However, the only presidential candidate was a member of this party.

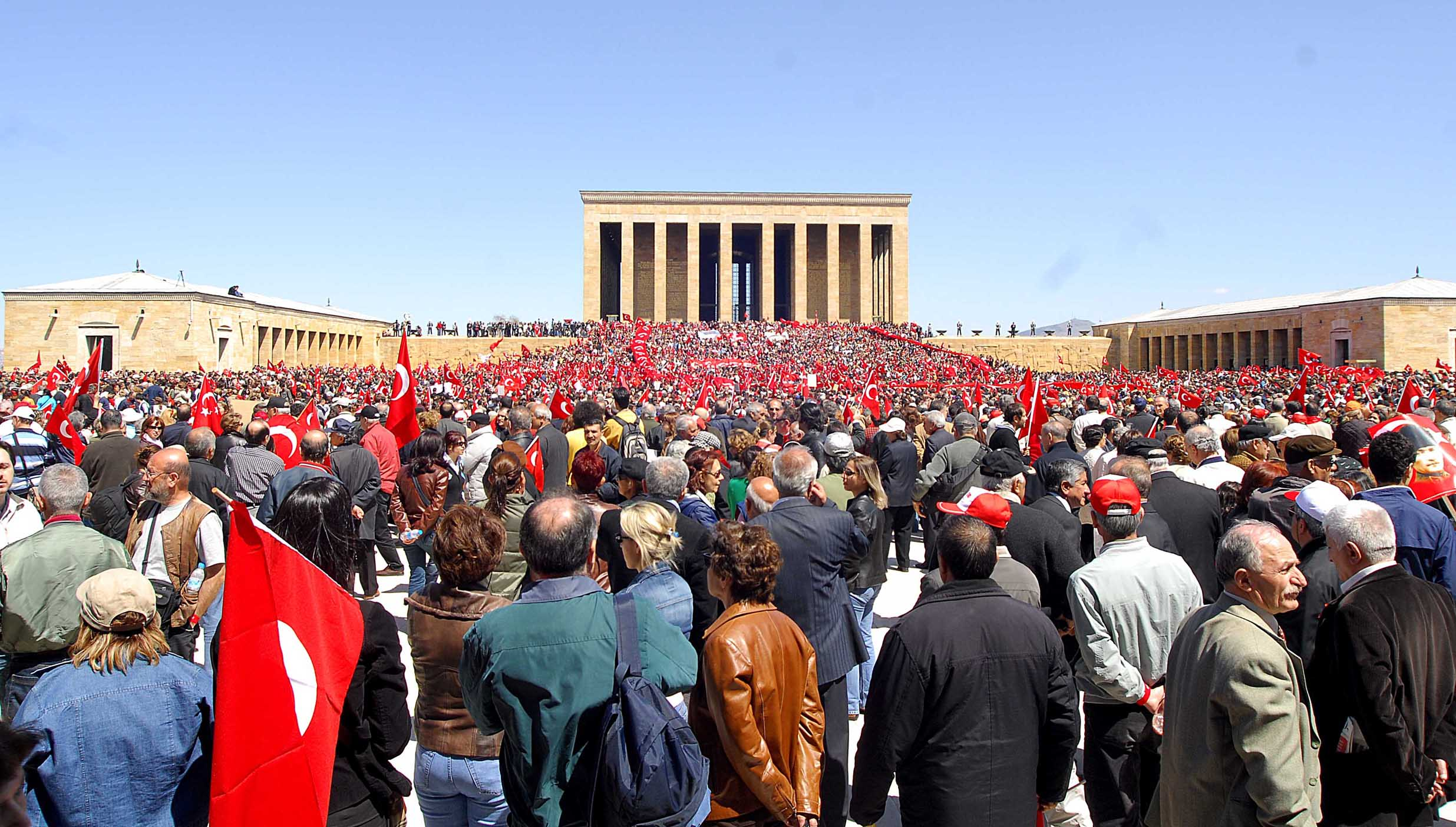
Turkish demonstrators in the large square before the Anıtkabir

A second rally was organised for 29 April 2007 opposing the candidacy of Abdullah Gül from the Justice and Development Party, which has its roots in political Islam. CNN Türk put the figure of those participating in the rally in defence of secularism at 1,370,000, the largest protest of its kind in Turkish history. The rally was broadcast live across the world. The spokesman of the meeting was Türkan Saylan.

A third mass rally took place in the western Turkish towns of Manisa, Çanakkale, and Bodrum in defence of the secular republic. The fifth rally took place at Alsancak Gündoğdu square, İzmir. A sixth rally was in Samsun and a seventh in Denizli.

==== E-memorandum ====
On 12 April 2007, in a press conference of the then Chief of the Turkish General Staff General Yaşar Büyükanıt, the Armed Forces' opinion on the elections was asked. Büyükanıt answered the question stating that the new president should be loyal to republic principles not only by words but also by heart.

On 27 April 2007, the Turkish Armed Forces issued a statement of its interests on its official website, later termed the "e-memorandum" by Ural Akbulut:

"...The problem that emerged in the presidential election process is focused on arguments over secularism. Turkish Armed Forces are concerned about the recent situation. ... the Turkish Armed Forces are a party in those arguments, and absolute defender of secularism..."

In response to these statements, government spokesman Cemil Çiçek made a speech. He said that 59th government was sensitive about the secular, democratic, social, and lawful state.

=== Voting on 27 April and 6 May ===
The first round of voting took place on 27 April 2007, which resulted in Abdullah Gül, the Minister of Foreign Affairs and the official candidate of the Justice and Development Party, achieving 357 votes. 361 members of the parliament were present at the elections and CHP, DYP, ANAVATAN, SHP, HYP, GP and some independent members boycotted the voting.

As of 27 April and 6 May 2007, the following parties were represented in the Turkish Grand National Assembly and therefore could vote:

Presidential election:	Seats	1. round; 27 April	Repeated 1. round 6 May
Justice and Development Party (AK Party)	352	352	352
Republican People's Party (CHP)	149	1	1
Motherland Party (ANAP)	20	2	2
True Path Party (DYP)	4	2	2
Social Democratic People's Party (SHP)	1	0	0
People's Ascent Party (HYP)	1	0	0
Young Party (GP)	1	0	0
Independents	13	11	
Total Seats/ Total (Yes)	541	357 (Among 361)	358(Among 358)
Total (No)		(180 boycotted)	(179 boycotted)
Please note that the distribution of seats has changed since the latest elections in 2002.

Votes taken by Abdullah Gül was below the two-thirds of the vote needed, and so, there would be another round of voting in the following days.

However, the opposition party Republican People's Party filed a claim to the Supreme Court, seeking a declaration of nullity in relation to the first round of voting.

On 1 May 2007, Supreme Court ruled that if two-thirds of the votes was needed to elect the president in the 1st round, then it was also needed that two-thirds of the parliament were present at the parliament. If this was not the case, the 1st round would have to be repeated. The constitutional court ruled in favour of the Republican People's Party and declared the first round annulled. Nine of the eleven members were in favour of annulling the voting. Therefore, there was no second round on 2 May 2007 as the first round election had failed. On 3 May, Recep Tayyip Erdoğan called for an early general election.

On 6 May 2007, the first round was repeated. The boycotting continued and the voting was not started at the parliament. The repeated round resulted in the withdrawal of Abdullah Gül as the necessary number of members present was not reached yet again.

On 9 May 2007, the presidential elections were postponed due to the lack of a candidate after the pullout of Abdullah Gül.

== Interim period ==
=== Succession controversy ===
Ahmet Necdet Sezer's term expired on 16 May 2007. This would have been the date when his successor would have been sworn in if the election had succeeded. Some claimed that Ahmet Necdet Sezer should leave the position and that the parliamentary speaker should fill the office until Sezer's successor was rightfully elected; however, it was decided that Sezer would retain the post until his successor's election.

=== Change of the method to popular vote ===
The parliament initially passed constitutional amendments for electoral reform (including election of the president by popular vote, shortening the term from seven to five years and allowing a second term) on 11 May, but Sezer vetoed the bill on 25 May over concerns that the change could pit a president with a strong popular mandate against the prime minister and cause instability. Parliament voted 370–21 to override the veto on 31 May. Sezer submitted the bill for a referendum on 15 June. Nevertheless, the CHP and Sezer filed for a cancellation of the vote by the Constitutional Court, citing alleged procedural flaws. This was turned down by the Constitutional Court in early July. In any case, the amendments were not in effect in time to change the ongoing process, under which the newly elected parliament had the duty to elect the president within 45 days, and under which there would be snap elections if the parliament failed to elect a new president.

=== The general election ===
The failure to select a President caused the 2007 general election to be brought forward, since the constitution states that a snap general election must be called to overcome the parliamentary deadlock, if a president is not elected. In the election, the AKP retained its majority and improved its popular vote count, but did not gain a two-thirds majority.

== Second election attempt: August 2007 ==
After the general election, the newly composed Grand National Assembly restarted the election for Sezer's successor.

=== Procedure ===
The parliament needed to gather 367 members to be present in the assembly for the election to begin. Among the members of the established session, the presidential vote is held by a secret ballot. A candidate requires a two-thirds majority (367 votes) to be elected in the first two rounds. If there is no clear winner before the third round, the winning threshold is dropped to a simple majority (276 votes). If there is still no winner, the two candidates with the most votes from the third round progress to a runoff election, where the simply majority rule still applies.

In the event of no clear winner among the two, the Constitution states that a snap general election must be called to overcome the parliamentary deadlock.

The parliament had scheduled the first three rounds of the election to be on 20 August, 24 August and 28 August.

=== Electors ===
Parties
Parties	Electors
Justice and Development Party (Adalet ve Kalkınma Partisi, AK Party)	341
Republican People's Party (Cumhuriyet Halk Partisi (CHP)	99
Nationalist Movement Party (Milliyetçi Hareket Partisi, MHP)	71
Democratic Society Party (Demokratik Toplum Partisi, DTP)	20
Democratic Left Party (Demokratik Sol Parti, DSP)	13
Great Union Party (Büyük Birlik Partisi, BBP)	1
Freedom and Solidarity Party (Özgürlük ve Dayanışma Partisi, ÖDP)	1
Independents (Bağımsız)	3
Total	550

=== Candidates ===
- Abdullah Gül, former Prime Minister, Deputy Prime Minister and Foreign Minister of Turkey from the Justice and Development Party (AK Party)
- Sabahattin Çakmakoğlu, former interior minister, defence minister and Member of Parliament from the Nationalist Movement Party (MHP)
- Hüseyin Tayfun İçli, member of the Democratic Left Party (DSP)
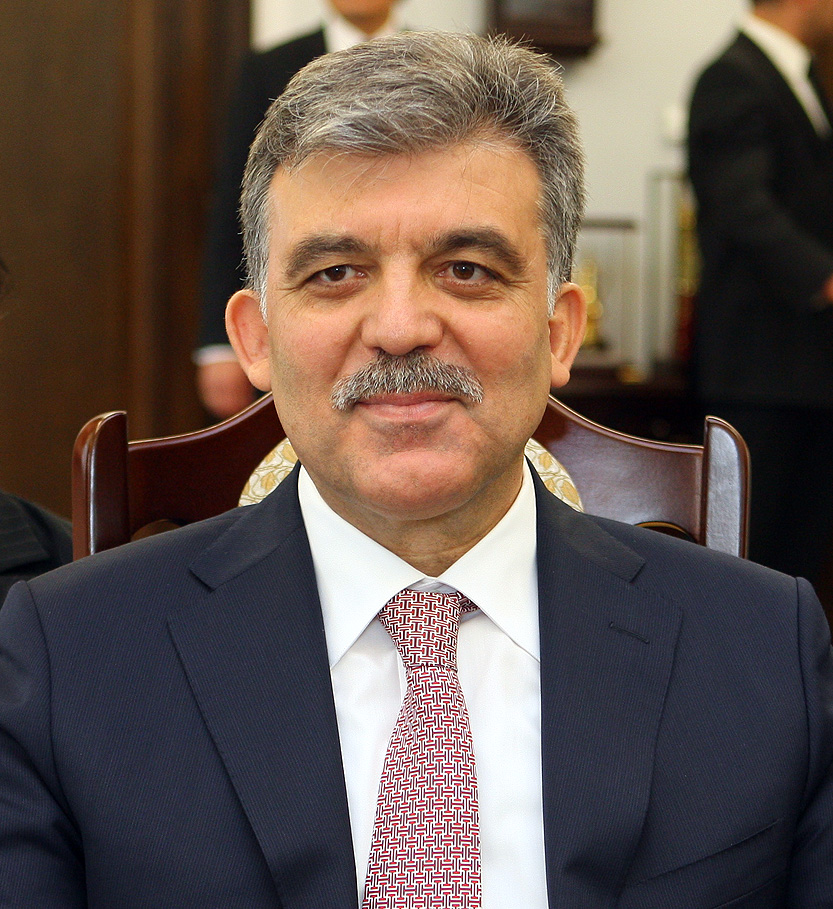
Abdullah Gül, former Prime Minister, Deputy Prime Minister and Foreign Minister of Turkey from the Justice and Development Party (AK Party)

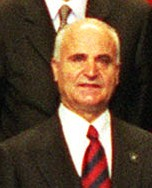
Sabahattin Çakmakoğlu, former interior minister, defence minister and Member of Parliament from the Nationalist Movement Party (MHP)

Following the general election, there was some speculation about whether Abdullah Gül would be nominated again by his party. There were hints that the prime minister might seek a consensus candidate, but ultimately Gül was renominated by his party on 13 August, after MHP announced its decision not to boycott the elections. Two other parties have decided to field their own candidates: The Nationalist Action Party nominated Sabahattin Çakmakoğlu on 17 August, and the Democratic Left Party nominated Hüseyin Tayfun İçli.

The secretary general of the Organisation of Islamic Co-operation, Ekmeleddin İhsanoğlu, was another potential consensus candidate from the Justice and Development Party, in the event that Gül was unsuccessful. İhsanoğlu was later the opposition candidate in the 2014 presidential election.

While Gül is seen as the favorite, a controversy started after Prime Minister Recep Tayyip Erdoğan's last speech. Erdoğan said "The people who say that (Gül is not my president), must renounce their citizenship" on television in reply to an article of Bekir Coşkun, a columnist known for his opposition to the ruling AK Party. A number people find this anti-democratic.

=== Voting ===
After completion of the third round on 28 August 2007, Abdullah Gül was elected. The results are:

Candidate	Party	First round		Second round		Third round	
Candidate	Party	Votes	%	Votes	%	Votes	%
Abdullah Gül	Justice and Development Party	341	80.42	337	79.86	339	80.33
Sabahattin Çakmakoğlu	Nationalist Movement Party	70	16.51	71	16.82	70	16.59
Hüseyin Tayfun İçli	Democratic Left Party	13	3.07	14	3.32	13	3.08
Total		424	100.00	422	100.00	422	100.00
Valid votes		424	94.64	422	94.62	422	94.20
Invalid/blank votes		24	5.36	24	5.38	26	5.80
Total votes		448	100.00	446	100.00	448	100.00
Registered voters/turnout		550	81.45	550	81.09	550	81.45
Source: Grand National Assembly

== See also ==
- 2000 Turkish presidential election
