= Göktaş =

Göktaş (IPA: [ɡœctaʃ], literally "sky stone", i. e. "meteor"; "meteorite") is a Turkish surname formed by the combination of the two Turkish words gök ("sky") and taş ("stone; rock"). It may refer to:

== People ==
- Emre Vefa Göktaş (born 2001), Turkish karateka
- İsmail Özgür Göktaş (born 1989), Turkish footballer
- Mustafa Levent Göktaş (born 1959), Turkish colonel

== Places ==
- Göktaş, Azdavay, a village in Kastamonu Province, Turkey
- Göktaş, Derik, a village in Mardin Province, Turkey
- Göktaş, Kilis, a village in Kilis Province, Turkey
- Göktaş, Tercan, a village in Erzincan Province, Turkey
