= Montreux Convention (disambiguation) =

Montreux Convention, Montreux Document or Montreux Declaration may refer to:

- Montreux Convention Regarding the Regime of the Straits, 1936 international agreement governing the Bosporus and Dardanelles straits in Turkey, often called the Montreux Declaration
- Montreux Convention Regarding the Abolition of the Capitulations in Egypt, 1937 international agreement abolishing he extraterritorial legal system for foreigners in Egypt
- Montreux Declaration, 2021 document opposing changes to the Montreux Convention Regarding the Regime of the Straits
- Montreux Declaration, 1947 document creating the World Federalist Movement/Institute for Global Policy, formerly the World Movement for World Federal Government
- Montreux Declaration on the vision and future of the Francophonie, 2010 document by the Organisation internationale de la Francophonie
- Montreux Document, 2008 international agreement regarding private military companies in war zones

== See also ==
- 1934 Montreux Fascist conference
- Montreux (disambiguation)
