= Taraf =

Turkish newspaper

- Type: Daily newspaper
- Format: Broadsheet
- Owner: Başar Arslan
- Publisher: Alkım Kitabevi
- Editor: Ahmet Altan (2007-2012); Neşe Düzel (2013-2016)
- Founded: 10 September 2002
- Ceased publication: 27 July 2016
- Political alignment: Social liberalism Liberal democracy Cultural liberalism Post-Kemalism; Gülenism
- Language: Turkish
- Headquarters: Istanbul, Turkey
- Circulation: 56571
- Website: taraf.com.tr at the Wayback Machine (archive index)

Taraf ("Side" in Turkish) was a social liberal newspaper in Turkey. It had distinguished itself by opposing interference by the Turkish military in the country's social and political affairs. It was distributed nationwide, and had been in circulation since November 15, 2007. On July 27, 2016, the newspaper was closed under a statutory decree during the state of emergency after the 2016 Turkish coup d'état attempt, due to its links with the coup plotters' Gülen movement.

== Overview ==
Taraf has published a series of highly-controversial stories that revealed the involvement of the Turkish military in daily political affairs. The revealed documents, such as coup plans that involved the bombing of historical mosques in Turkey ("Sledgehammer" coup plan) and bombing of a museum (Operation Cage Action Plan), significantly damaged the social image of the Turkish military. The sources that leaked such critical insider information to Taraf are still unknown.

The response of the Turkish military to Taraf included canceling the newspaper's accreditation from press releases at its headquarters. A political journal, Nokta, had similarly published leaked military information (Sarıkız, Ayışığı, Yakamoz and Eldiven) and was closed down in 2007 due to pressure.

The founder and owner of Taraf, Başar Arslan, dismisses accusations of bias and outside funding, saying that he has made a considerable loss in his mission to create what he calls the country's most prestigious newspaper. He considers Taraf an investment that will eventually pay off.

Some prominent names of Taraf, such as reporter Mehmet Baransu, columnist Emre (Emrullah) Uslu, and former columnist Önder Aytaç are known for their affiliation with the Gülen movement, although it has been denied that they act as quasi-official representatives of the movement.

Taraf also served the interests of the Gülen movement in other ways, including silencing the allegations of cheating in compulsory public servants’ examinations in Turkey.

== History ==
In 2011 Taraf became the first Turkish partner of the whistle-blowing website WikiLeaks, joining internationally known publications in signing a contract to publish the site's leaked documents firsthand. The Turkish daily was picked by WikiLeaks because it is "the bravest newspaper in Turkey", as described by the site's founder, Julian Assange.

On 14 December 2012, founding editor-in-chief Ahmet Altan, his assistant editor Yasemin Çongar, columnists Murat Belge and Neşe Düzel stepped down from their posts at the newspaper. The next day, columnist Hadi Uluengin followed the leaving group of journalists. Owner of the daily, Başar Arslan stated that the resignations resulted from difference of opinion that developed in recent times, and nevertheless, the newspaper will continue to be published.

== Columnists ==
- Oral Çalışlar (Sıfır Noktası)
- Murat Belge (Türkiye'nin Halleri)
- Roni Margulies (Solduyu)
- Oya Baydar (Vicdan Yazıları)
- Orhan Pamuk
- Ümit Kıvanç (Açın Türkiye'nin Önünü)
- Alper Görmüş (Medyaironik)
- Cengiz Aktar (Quo Vadimus)
- Cihan Aktaş (Sınır Yazıları)
- Hadi Uluengin (Modern Zamanlar)
- -David-Hidir Gevis (Öteki Amerika-The Other America)
- Demiray Oral (Vaziyet)
- İhsan Bilgin (Neredeyse)
- Sivilay Genç (Sivilay Abla)
- Halil Berktay (Okuma Notları)
- Lale Kemal (Bakış Acısı)
- Pakize Barışta (Kıyı)
- Rengin Soysal (Bu Yaka)
- Temel İskit (Yazı)
- Yıldıray Oğur (Manifestom)
- Sezin Öney (Yeni Avrupa)
- Markar Esayan (Arada)
- Telesiyej
- Sevan Nişanyan (Kelimebaz)
- Mehmet Güreli (Trapez)
- A. Esra Yalazan (Kameriye)
- Mithat Sancar (Meo Voto)
- Cem Sey (Uzak Batı)
- Erol Katırcıoğlu (Arayış)
- Pelin Cengiz (Kulis Tarafı)
- Ali Abaday
- Emre Uslu (Açılım)
- Cahit Koytak (Yoksulları ve Siviller için Tezler)
- Melih Altınok (Solaçık)
- Kurtuluş Tayiz (Dar Kapı)
- Ramazan Çanakkaleli (İş ve Güvenlik Dünyası)
- Gülengül Altınsay
- Ferhat Kentel (Yerin Yedi Kat Altı)
- Tuğba Tekerek (Söyleşi)
- Bülent Şirin (Gündem Dışı)
- Namık Çınar (Geç Kalmış Yazılar)
- Fatih Uraz (Ağların İçinden)
- Evrim Bunn (Okyanus Ötesi / Washington)
- Özlem Ertan (Operatik)
- Ali Fikri Işık (Kör Saatçi)
- Gürbüz Özaltınlı (Sağlı Sollu)
- Sibel Oral (Edebiyat Söyleşileri)
- Adrienne Woltersdorf (Çin Mahallesi)
- Serdar Kaya (Taraf Üniversitesi)
- Mehmet Baransu (Kozmik Köşe)
- Fatih Uraz (Kalecinin Seyir Defteri)
- Andrew Finkel (Pasatiempo)
- Numan Türer (Aniden)
- Abdullah Karatash (Dünya Piyasaları)
- Levent Yılmaz (Paralel Hayatlar)
- Ali Erden
- Sedat Tunalı (Hür ve Hesapsız)
- Haluk Çetin (Oyun Bozan)
- Gökhan Karabulut (Zamanın Ruhu)
- Esmeray (Cadının Bohçası)
- Kerem Altan (İmza)
- Ayça Şen (Şarzör)
- Hidayet Şefkatli Tuksal (Hemderd)

Cartoonist

- Tan Oral
