= Hidayet Şefkatli Tuksal =

Turkish feminist and human rights activist

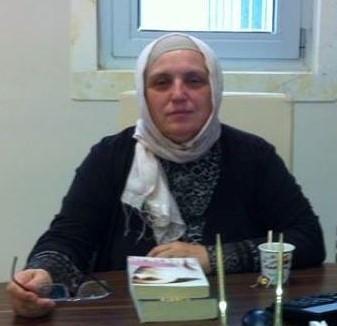
Hidayet Şefkatli Tuksal

Hidayet Şefkatli Tuksal (born 1963) is a Turkish human rights activist, Islamic feminist and columnist. She lectures in theology at Mardin Artuklu University.

== Biography ==
Hidayet Şefkatli Tuksal was born in 1963 in Ankara, Turkey to a Muslim family from the Balkans. In 1980 she enrolled in the theology faculty of Ankara University. She joined a religious order during her time there and started veiling. She received a PhD in Islamic theology from there.

In 1994, Tuksal co-founded the Women's Platform of the Capital (Başkent Kadın Platformu). The Platform challenged the religious basis of sexism and brought attention to the discrimination and injustice experienced by religious women in secular settings.

Tuksal undertook postgraduate studies in philosophy at Middle East Technical University. After experiencing obstructions and attacks due to her headscarf, she was forced to abandon the university. She opened a clothing store with her sisters and mother after she was unable to find a job she enjoyed. Tuksal taught at an İmam Hatip school for a time before enrolling in a doctoral program. Following the 1997 postmodern coup and February 28 process, headscarves were banned in Turkish educational institutions. Tuksal identified this as a women's issue, and related that women who wear headscarves were most adversely affected by the process. She noted that even some conservative Muslim and Islamist men did not consider women wearing headscarves in Islamist institutions to be presentable due to the prevalent Kemalist discourse.

Tuksal identifies as a religious feminist. She has studied religious texts and challenged Islamist ideas that lead to the marginalization of women. She authored an academic study of gender bias in hadith in 2001. She has called for the resolution of contradictory assertions about the rights of women in the hadiths.

Tuksal also wrote a history of Turkey's Islamist women's movement. She has noted the divide between Islamic and secular feminists in Turkey.

Beginning in 2012, Tuksal was a columnist for the newspaper Taraf.

Tuksal is married and has three children.
