= Sarıkız, Ayışığı, Yakamoz and Eldiven =

Alleged coup plans in Turkey

Sarıkız, Ayışığı, Yakamoz, Eldiven were the names of alleged Turkish military coup plans in 2004.

== Plans ==
In 2007, the Nokta weekly published portions of a diary purportedly belonging to the retired general Özden Örnek, indicating that four coup plans were prepared: Sarıkız (blonde girl; idiomatic for 'cow'), Ayışığı (moonlight), Yakamoz (Sea Sparkle), and Eldiven (glove). some have argued the names are code for army, airforce, navy, and police respectfully Admiral Örnek himself called the diary a forgery. The Armed Forces evaded the issue without denying its authenticity altogether. For his part, general Hurşit Tolon said he found no reason to object to the publication of the diaries since they contained no false statements about him. The diary was not used as evidence in the 2455-page-long indictment.

Eldiven indicated a "discord within the Turkish Armed Forces" on the matter of supporting coup plans and proposed remedies to overcome it. The main purpose of Eldiven was to "shape the TSK, Parliament, the bureaucracy and local governments and rewrite the Constitution, the entire legislation and the National Security Policy Document." According to the alleged plan, cell organizations of people from different segments of society would be formed. These would be unaware of each other's existence and work without knowing the ultimate purpose for which they were serving. These guerrilla tactics had been employed earlier by the Counter-Guerrilla, the Turkish branch of Operation Gladio.

The plan called for psychological warfare to shape public opinion. The first stage of the plan was to ensure national consensus, shaping decisions taken by the Supreme Military Council (Turkish: Yüksek Askerî Şûra, YAŞ) by talking to journalists and having them publish the ideas of active generals. The plan also involved then-President Ahmet Necdet Sezer in shaping the YAŞ.

Eldiven proposed to support and use the media to exhaust liberal and democratic political opponents and rally public opinion behind the army's plans. Speaking to the newspaper Taraf, political analyst Ali Bayramoğlu said that the major newspapers were aware of the coup plans, since they had been approached by the generals for support, but that they did not initially write about it. When the generals realized that the broad support they had sought was not forthcoming, they fell into disarray. Şener Eruygur, in particular, drew up a plan to undertake a coup by himself. He is currently under custody.

Sarp Kuray, a leftist who was sentenced to life imprisonment after the 1971 coup, likened these plans to the 1971 coup attempt, which had been thwarted by intelligence reaching the Chief of Staff, Memduh Tağmaç.

== Authenticity ==
The diary was corroborated by minutes of the meeting on which the diary was based, which were found in the home of retired captain Muzaffer Yıldırım. Along with Tolon and Eruygur, Yıldırım was detained as part of an investigation into a conspiratorial organization named "Ergenekon".

The diary was not mentioned in the Ergenekon indictment. Görmüş said this was because the diary was obtained illegally and therefore inadmissible in a court of law.

== Selected quotes ==
The newspaper Today's Zaman reproduced portions of the diary:

... Upon the suggestion of Gendarmerie Forces Commander Gen. Şener Eruygur, we went to the social facilities of the gendarmerie. (...) We decided to form an action plan on our own. We were first going to take control of the media, so I was going to invite M.Ö. for that purpose. We were going to keep in contact with rectors and arrange for students to engage in demonstrations. We were going to act in unison with unions. We were going to get posters hung in the streets. We were going to contact associations and incite them against the government. We were going to do all of this across the country, and it would be known as Sarıkız.

... They all gathered at the headquarters of the gendarmerie, and Gen. Eruygur showed them the preparations I had been shown on Tuesday and had them listen to a number of voice recordings that belong to some high-ranking government officials. Most of them were advisors to the Justice and Development Party and in the recordings they share their ideas on how they are planning to handle the Cyprus problem. At the end of the briefing, the commander of the Air Forces (Gen. İbrahim Fırtına) and the commander of the Gendarmerie Forces (Eruygur) started pressing for a revolution on March 10. (...) Eruygur's target is to become the commander of the Land Forces. (...) The current commander of the Land Forces (Gen. Aytaç Yalman) told me how Eruygur is digging a pit for (Chief of General Staff Gen.) Yaşar (Büyükanıt). To me, the commander of the Gendarmerie Forces was acting a little unfairly and in an overly ambitious manner.

... We gathered in my house with the commanders of the air forces, the navy, the army and the gendarmerie forces at 2 p.m. … The second topic again turned out to be the same one, 'We should topple these fellows,' was what we discussed. Şener and the air guy (Fırtına) are pressing too much for this. Şener can't get it out of his mind; he repeats the same thing every two words. So does the air guy. If we don't want to give away Cyprus, our furthest limit is April 9, 2004. Whatever we must do, we should do before that.

== Ergenekon charges ==
These excerpts were later cited as key evidence in the March 2009 indictment of a round of suspects, including retired generals Eruygur and Tolon, arrested in the course of the ongoing investigations into the alleged illegal Ergenekon organization and charged with plotting to overthrow the legal government of the Republic of Turkey.
