= Alper Görmüş =

Turkish journalist and writer

Ahmet Alper Görmüş (born 21 November 1952) is a Turkish journalist and writer, formerly a columnist for Taraf and Yeni Aktüel. He was the editor-in-chief of the news weekly Nokta (2006–7).

He was previously a contributor to Aydınlık (1977–1980), working outside journalism in a variety of roles after it was closed down following the 1980 Turkish coup d'état. He resumed journalism at Nokta (1986–1990), and was then editor-in-chief of Yeni Aktüel (1991–1995). He received the Hrant Dink International Award in 2009, with Amira Hass.
