= Nokta =

Turkish news magazine

- Frequency: weekly
- First issue: 1 March 1982
- Final issue: 2016
- Country: Turkey
- Language: Turkish
- ISSN: 1301-613X
- OCLC: 10805922

Nokta ("Point" in Turkish) was a leading Turkish weekly political news magazine. Founded in 1983, it was closed down by its owner in 2007 under military pressure after revealing several coup plots. Revived in 2015, it was closed again in the course of the 2016–17 Turkish purges.

Contributors to Nokta included Ayşe Arman, Can Dündar and Ahmet Şık.

== History and profile ==
The magazine was launched by Ercan Arıklı on 1 March 1982 as Nokta ve İnsanlar. It became Nokta in 1983. The magazine had a liberal and progressive stance during the Ercan Arıklı period and In 1989 it was the highest-circulation news weekly in Turkey, ahead of 2000'e Doğru.

In March 2007, Nokta ran a story, written by its Editor in Chief, Ahmet Alper Görmüş, revealing a confidential campaign of the military blacklisting some journalists and press organs, based on a leaked report prepared by the Office of the Chief of General Staff categorizing journalists as "trustworthy" (pro military) and "untrustworthy" (anti military). While the military acknowledged the existence of such a list, they declared that the version published by Nokta was "only a draft". Metehan Demir of Sabah newspaper argued that Nokta's report did not conform to the format used by the military.

Later that month, Nokta published excerpts of a diary, allegedly written by admiral Özden Örnek, a former navy commander. Following the publication, the magazines offices were raided by the police in a three-day operation. The diary detailed two plans for a military coup, both by the commanders of the army (Aytaç Yalman), navy (Özden Örnek) and the air force (İbrahim Fırtına), together with the gendarmerie chief (Şener Eruygur), and aiming to overthrow the AK Party government in 2004.

Subsequently, its owner, Ayhan Durgun, discontinued the publication. Görmüş joined the daily Taraf where he criticized journalists who were aware of the diaries for not revealing them.

In 2007, Nokta published portions of a diary purportedly belonging to the retired admiral Özden Örnek, indicating that three coup plans were prepared: Sarıkız (blonde girl; idiomatic for 'cow'), Ayışığı (moonlight), and Eldiven (glove). Admiral Örnek himself called the diary a forgery. The Armed Forces prevaricated on this issue without denying its authenticity altogether. For his part, general Hurşit Tolon said he found no reason to object to the publication of the diaries since it contained no false statements about him. The diary was not used as evidence in the 2455 page indictment.

The diary agrees with minutes of the meeting on which the diary was based. The minutes were found in the home of retired captain Muzaffer Yıldırım who, along with Tolon and Eruygur, was detained in the frame of an investigation into a conspiratorial organization named "Ergenekon". On this basis, now-defunct Taraf newspaper claimed that the diaries were authentic.

These excerpts were later cited as key evidence in the March 2009 indictment of a round of suspects, including retired generals Eruygur and Tolon, arrested in the course of the ongoing investigations into the alleged illegal Ergenekon organization and charged with plotting to overthrow the legal government of the Republic of Turkey.

== 2015 Revival ==
In 2015 Ramazan Köse revived the magazine.

== Cevheri Güven and Murat Çapan were sentenced to 22.5 years ==
The satirical cover of a September 2015 edition of weekly Nokta Magazine criticised Erdoğan for inciting and exploiting the conflict and its casualties for personal political PR purposes. Erdoğan had the edition banned and the entire circulation confiscated for allegedly "insulting" him.

Cevheri Güven, editor-in-chief of Nokta magazine, and Murat Çapan, Editor-in-Chief, were sentenced to 22.5 years in prison each by the Istanbul 14th High Criminal Court on 22 May 2017. Güven and Çapan were accused of 'trying to start a civil war in Turkey' because of the news that Turkey could be dragged into a civil war due to Erdogan's tension policies. Güven and Çapan, who stayed in Silivri Prison for two months in 2015, were then released pending trial.

After the release, the court board was disbanded, and the lawyer of Nokta magazine, Kadir Kökten, was arrested. Bünyamin Karakaş, one of the judges of the court, was arrested. The newly appointed court board sentenced the two journalists to 22.5 years in prison separately.

The case in which Murat Çapan was tried was overturned in the Court of Appeal in procedural terms. Capan was tried again and his sentence was increased to 25 years by the Istanbul 14th High Criminal Court.

Murat Capan, responsible editor-in-chief of Nokta magazine, went to Greece on May 24, 2017, two days after his 22.5-year prison sentence and applied for asylum. However, he was thrown back to Turkey from the border of Dimetoka by the Greek border security police. Capan was captured and arrested by the Turkish Gendarmerie on the Turkish border. Human Rights Associations and the United Nations reacted to Greece because of this practice. The issue caused great controversy in Greece. The Potami Party filed a criminal complaint against the Syriza government. In addition, the Greek Human Rights Association filed a criminal complaint against the police officers who sent Murat Capan back despite his asylum.

Capan is still in prison.

Cevheri Güven, on the other hand, left Turkey illegally with her family. He still lives in Europe. Due to a satirical cover image critical of Recep Tayyip Erdoğan for inciting and exploiting the conflict and its casualties for personal political PR purposes, the magazine was raided by the police and its 18. edition in September 2015 was banned and the entire circulation confiscated for allegedly "insulting" Erdoğan.

== The magazine is closed ==
The magazine was closed in July 2016. In May 2017, the last editor-in-chief Murat Çapan was sentenced to over 22 years in jail for allegedly "inciting an armed uprising against the Turkish government" and was arrested while attempting to flee to neighboring Greece.

== See also ==
- Censorship in Turkey
- Media freedom in Turkey
