= Cihan Aktas =

Turkish writer, researcher and journalist

- Cihan Aktaş
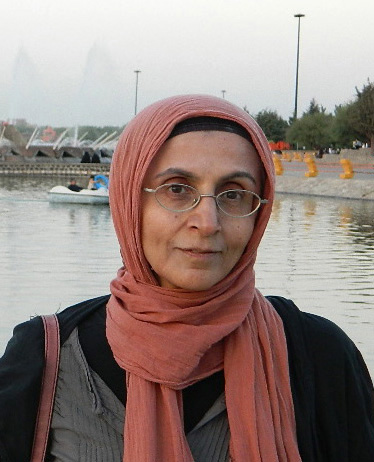
- Born: January 15, 1960 (age 66); Erzincan, Turkey
- Education: Mimar Sinan Fine Arts University (1986, B.S.Arch)
- Occupations: Author, researcher, journalist
- Writing career
- Period: 1980–present
- Genres: Short story, fiction, novel, research, essay

Cihan Aktas (born January 15, 1960) (Turkish: Cihan Aktaş) is a Turkish writer, researcher and journalist. She is the sister of Turkish poet and writer Umit Aktas.

Best known for her short story collections, Aktas has published more than forty books of fiction and non-fiction, including her best seller novel Write Long Letters To Me and her well-researched commentary book The Poetry of the East: Iranian Cinema which is an academic favorite on the subject. She was a political newspaper columnist in 1980's, focusing her research papers and articles on women who experienced a traumatic social transformation in Turkey; and has published several books on topics such as exploitation of women, gender and identity politics, and hijab in public space, as a hijabi woman herself.

Aktas has been described as a "strong feminist in a minimalist sense" and her literary style as "impressionist fiction". Her female characters "do not give concessions on their identity" and "usually has reached the climax of a longlasting problem." Her novels have been described as a leap forward within the Turkish literature, which traditionally women were the second or third characters.

She is married with two children and currently lives in Istanbul.

== Early life ==
Aktas was born in Refahiye, a small town in the Erzincan Province of Turkey. Her father Cemal Aktas, a public school teacher and a trade unionist, ran a bookstore in town, where Aktas fell in love with books from an early age. She graduated from Beşikdüzü High School of Education at 1978, and moved to Istanbul with her family right after, where she studied architecture in Mimar Sinan Fine Arts University and graduated in 1978.

== Career ==
After graduating from university, Aktas worked as an architect, media consultant and journalist. Her first two books were autobiographies of two prominent women in Islam, Fatima (pub. 1984) and Zeynep (pub. 1985). She was the creator and editor of women's issues section in Yeni Devir newspaper between years 1983–1985, and her third book The Woman at the Center of Exploitation consisted of her columns published in the newspaper. She continued to publish essays and research books with the theme of women in the following years, such as The Woman Within the System (1988), Clothing and Power: From Ottoman Reforms to This Day (1989), Hijab and Society: An Essay on the Roots of Hijabi Students (1991), From Sister to Lady: Muslim Women in Public Space (2001). The latter was banned in Turkey based on the Turkish Constitution's Section TCK 312, but the court order was deemed unconstitutional and the ban was lifted a few years later.

From 1991 on, she concentrated on literature, publishing a series of short story books including A Child of Three Coups (1991), The Final Magical Days (1995), Doily in Water (1999), Shahrazad Has a Mouth but No Tongue (2001), Rooms without Walls (2005), A Flawless Picnic (2009), Humming in Footprints (2013), The one Standing Apart in Photographs (2017).

As a columnist, Aktas wrote in Yeni Şafak newspaper in 1990's and Taraf between 2008 and 2017. Other magazines that have published her work include Girişim, Aylık Dergi, Bu Meydan, Kıtap Dergisi, İzlenim and Dergah. Today, she continues to write columns in weekly newspaper Gerçek Hayat and online outlets such as Dünya Bülteni, Hayal Perdesi and Son Peygamber.

Her first novel Write Long Letters to Me, a semi-autobiographical book set in a boarding high school was published in 2002, subsequently becoming the recipient of Turkish Writers' Society's Novel of the Year Award. Both Write Long Letters to Me and her second novel Someone Who Listens To You have been described as period novels. Her critically acclaimed novel Shirin's Wedding published in 2016, is a modern interpretation of Persian Poet Nizami's Khosrow and Shirin, telling the story of a love triangle with the backdrop of complicated social and political controversies of 2000's Turkey.

Aktas lived in Iran and Azerbaijan for many years due to her marriage, and the experience influenced both her literary style and subjects of interest. She published essays and research books about Iran such as The Poetry of the East: Iranian Cinema (1998), Revolutionaries of Yesterday, Reformists of Today (2004) and The Neighboring Stranger (2008). During her years in Iran, she taught Creative Writing and Turkish literature lessons at the Allameh Tabataba'i University. After moving back to Istanbul, she gave Cinema Culture lessons at Eyup Film Academy.

Her research book To Get Along with the Wind was published in 2018 and tells the history of Esenler, one of the oldest neighborhoods of Istanbul.

"Seattle Diaries" that chronicles Aktas' time in Seattle taking care of her grandson was published in 2020 following publication of two essay books about cinema earlier the same year: Beyond Dreams: Life, Symbols and Cinema and Films I remember.

== Literary style and subjects ==
Aktas' successive trilogy of autobiographical novels published between 2002 and 2012 are said to "represent three ages with regard to the personal and in terms of Turkey politics." Her writing style has been described as impressionist realism and her common themes include questioning power dynamics in relationships, a search for miracles in ordinary and examining conditions which silence women. She conducted research in multiple Turkish cities for over four years to write her 2021 Novel "The Poet and The Night Owl", bringing her literary writing and investigative journalism together.

== Awards ==
In 1995, Aktas' The Final Magical Days received the Turkish Writers' Society's Short Story Award, and she was chosen as the Storyteller of the Year by the Genclik Magazine in 1997. Her first novel "Writer Long Letters To Me" was the recipient of 2002 Novel of the Year Award by the Turkish Writers' Society. A Flawless Picnic, her short story book was chosen as the 2009 Book of the Year by The Literature, Art and Culture Research Association. She received the Ahmet Hamdi Tanpinar Prize at the 15th Bursa Literature Days in 2015 and the Necip Fazıl Kısakürek Novel and Short Story Award in 2016. Her book You'd Know if You Were My Daughter was awarded the Omer Seyfettin Short Story Award in the same year. She was the recipient of 2018 Dede Korkut Literature Prize.

== Publications ==
=== Novels/Diaries ===
- Write Long Letters To Me (2002)
- Someone Who Listens To You (2007)
- Close To the Border (2013)
- Shirin's Wedding (2016)
- Seattle Diaries (2020)
- The Poet and The Night Owl (2021)
- The Time Had Stopped in Cameroon (2025)

=== Short story collections ===
- A Child of Three Coups (1991)
- The Final Magical Days (1995)
- Suffering in the Face (1996)
- Last Days of Azize (1997)
- Doily in Water (1999)
- Shahrazad Has a Mouth but No Tongue (2001)
- Because I look Like My Aunt (2003)
- Rooms Without Walls (2005)
- A Flawless Picnic (2009)
- Humming in Footprints (2013)
- You'd Know If You Were My Daughter (2015)
- The one Standing Apart in Photographs (2017)
- The Unforgotten (2018)
- Kar Gibi Patiskalar (2024)

=== Essays/research/Journalism ===
- Fatima (1984)
- Zaynab (1985)
- The Woman at the Center of Exploitation (1985)
- Farewell Sermon (1985)
- The Woman Within the System (1988)
- Clothing and Power: From Ottoman Reforms to This Day (1989)
- Hijab and Society: An Essay on the Roots of Hijabi Students (1991)
- Homelessness of Modernism and the Necessity of Family (1992)
- On the Exhaustion of Privacy (1995)
- The Poetry of the East: Iranian Cinema (1998)
- From Sister to Lady: Muslim Women in Public Space (2001)
- Revolutionaries of Yesterday, Reformists of Today (2004)
- The Neighboring Stranger (2008)
- The Language of Fellowship (2010)
- Parenthesis of Power: Woman Language Identity (2008)
- Islamism/Something Else is Missing (2014)
- Eclipse of the City (2015)
- To Get Along with the Wind (2018)
- Beyond Dreams (2020)
- Films I remember (2020)
- Scheherazade in Balcony (2024)
- To Get Along with the Wind (reprint) (2024)
- The Streets Won't Forget (2024)
