= Çetin Altan =

Turkish writer, journalist, and a member of parliament (2015-1927)

- Born: 22 June 1927; Istanbul, Turkey
- Died: 22 October 2015 (aged 88); Istanbul, Turkey
- Resting place: Zincirlikuyu Cemetery
- Education: Galatasaray High School; Ankara University (Law)
- Occupations: Writer, lead columnist
- Political party: Workers Party of Turkey (1965–1969)
- Spouses: Kerime Altan (died 1991): Solmaz Kamuran
- Children: Ahmet Altan; Mehmet Altan; Zeynep Nurhayat Altan

Çetin Altan (22 June 1927 – 22 October 2015) was a Turkish writer, journalist, and a member of parliament. He was considered one of the finest writers in the modern Turkish language of the late 20th century.

== Early years ==
Çetin Altan was born on 22 June 1927 to lawyer Halit Bey of Crimean Tatar descent and his wife Nurhayat. Until age seven, he was called Altan. With the adoption of the Surname Law in Turkey in 1934, the family chose the name Altan as their surname, and the son was renamed Çetin.

At age eight, he was schooled in the elite Galatasaray High School as a boarding pupil, where he suffered from loneliness. After graduating from the high school, he received a degree from the Ankara University, Law School.

He chose a writing career instead of pursuing a diplomatic career contrary to his father's will as he related once in an interview "to escape the loneliness".

== Family life ==
Çetin Altan grew up in the family mansion at Göztepe, Istanbul. He married Kerime, whom he met at Radio Ankara, where she worked as the director secretary of his father. She was brought to Ankara from Iraq by her sister's husband, an Ottoman officer, along with her mother and sister when she was only forty days old.

Kerime Altan gave birth to two sons, Ahmet in 1950, Mehmet in 1953 and a daughter, Zeynep. She died in 1991. The Altan family believed that Kerime was of Arab descent. Following her death, they learnt that she was a relative of Iraqi Kurdish politician Fuad Masum.

In 1996 at age 69, Çetin Altan made his second marriage with 41-year old Solmaz Kamuran, who also had a marriage before. They had known each other for a long time. Solmaz Kamuran was a dentist before she began editing Çetin's writings. In the final months of Altan's life, the couple separated.

== Writing career ==
He published his poems and stories in such magazines as Çınaraltı, Varlık, İstanbul and Kaynak. His first book Üçüncü Mevki was published in 1946. He entered journalism as a reporter in the newspaper Ulus. After writing columns in Hürses, Altan continued as a columnist in various newspapers including Halkçı, Tan, Akşam, Milliyet, Yeni Ortam, Hürriyet, Güneş and the magazine Çarşaf.

In 1959, Altan accepted the offer of Abdi İpekçi (1929–1979) to write columns for the daily Milliyet replacing Peyami Safa (1899-1961). He was very much dismayed over the death of the university student Turan Emeksiz, who was killed by a police bullet during a student demonstration at the end of April 1960 against the ruling Democrat Party.

== Politics ==
Altan entered politics after the 1960 Turkish coup d'état, and was elected to the parliament from the Workers Party of Turkey (Turkish: Türkiye İşçi Partisi, TİP) following the 1965 general election. He served until 1969 as a deputy of Istanbul Province. He wrote his deputy years at his book, namely, 'When I was Deputy' (Turkish: Ben Milletvekili Iken). To get more information about his deputy years and Turkey's politicians' visions, his book is very nice reference.

Known for his sharp tongue, he once said to the parliament's deputy speaker disrespecting him with the phrase "Your seat is higher than mine due to a carpentry error!". Following the deputy speaker's warning to recant, he replied "It is not a carpentry error that you sit higher than me!".

On the 20 February 1968, after having called Nazim Hikmet a “great poet“, he was physically attacked and beaten in parliament by more than hundred MPs of the Justice Party (AP) He has been prosecuted more than 300 times because of his articles. Altan has been arrested three times and served two years in prison.

== Works ==
He published several novels and collections of essays, dealing with and criticizing the social and political situation of Turkey as well as the problems of contemporary Turkish society and culture in the second half of the 20th century from a socialistic/culturally liberal perspective. Many of his novels and essays contain autobiographical elements connected with his own political and personal struggles.

Altan's writings in the 1960s and 1970s were published in his books Taş ("Satire", lit. 'Stone'), Sömürücülerle Savaş ("Struggle against the Exploiters"), Suçlanan Yazılar ("Accused Writings"), "Kahrolsun Komünizm" Diye Diye Globalleşme ("Globalization Saying 'Down with Communism'"), Onlar Uyanırken ("While They Awaken"), Kopuk Kopuk ("Broken off"), ‘Geçip Giderken ("While Going by"), Gölgelerin Gölgesi ("Shadow of Shadows"), Şeytanın Aynaları ("Mirrors of the Devil"), Bir Yumak İnsan ("A Group of People") and Nar Çekirdekleri ("Pomegranate Seeds").

He wrote his novel Büyük Gözaltı ("The Great Detention") in 1972, which narrates his experience in the prison following the 1971 Turkish coup d'état and is considered as the first of its sort relating to the period. It brought to Altan the Orhan Kemal Novel Award in 1973.

In addition to his numerous writings and books, Çetin Altan also wrote theatre plays such as Çemberler ("Circles"), Mor Defter ("The Purple Notebook"), Suçlular ("The Convicted") in 1965, Dilekçe ("The Petition") and Tahteravalli ("The Seesaw"). Furthermore, he has two essays, Aşk, Sanat ve Servet ("Love, Art and Wealth") and Atatürk’ün Sosyal Görüşleri ("The Social Views of Atatürk") in 1965, as well as a humor book, Zurnada Peşrev Olmaz ("There is No Prelude in the Clarion"). He wrote also books of travel, autobiography, poetry and even an alphabet book.

His life story was portrayed in the novel İpek Böceği Cinayeti ("The Silkworm Murder") by his author wife Solmaz Kamuran in 1998.

His novels Büyük Gözaltı ("Etroite surveillance"), Bir Avuç Gökyüzüir ("Une poignée de ciel"), Viski ("Whisky") and Zurnada Peşrev Olmaz Küçük Bahçe ("Ixe enseveli ou le Petit jardin") were also translated into French and published in France.

== Death ==
Çetin Altan was taken to the hospital of the Fatih University Medicine Faculty at Maltepe, Istanbul in September 2015, where he was treated after being diagnosed with multiple health problems including chronic obstructive pulmonary disease (COPD), respiratory failure, bronchiectasis, pneumonia, urinary tract infection and sepsis. On 19 October Altan was hospitalized again due to a urinary tract infection. He died on 22 October 2015 at 11:05 hours local time at age 88 due to respiratory failure as a result of pneumonia and septic shock.

He was interred at Zincirlikuyu Cemetery on 23 October 2015, following a memorial ceremony before the building of Millyet newspaper and the consequent religious funeral service at Teşvikiye Mosque. He is survived by his sons Mehmet Altan, Ahmet Altan, daughter Zeynep Nurhayat Altan and granddaughter Sanem Altan.

== Books ==
In Turkish

- Kopuk Kopuk. Istanbul: İnkılap Kitabevi. 2000. p. 384. ISBN 978-975-101-5488.
- Sömürücülerle Savaş. Istanbul: Dönem Yayınevi. 1965. p. 95.
- Viski. Istanbul: İnkılap Kitabevi. 1975. p. 264. ISBN 978-975-101-3088.
- Nar Çekirdekleri. Istanbul: İnkılap Kitabevi. 1976. p. 566. ISBN 978-975-101-2579.
- Tarihin Saklanan Yüzü. Istanbul: Inkilap Kitabevi. 1997. p. 269. ISBN 978-975-101-2104.
- Bir Yumak Insan. Istanbul: Inkilap Kitabevi. 1998. ISBN 978-975-101-3118.
- Zurnada Peşrev Olmaz. Istanbul: Inkilap Kitabevi. 1998. p. 264. ISBN 978-975-101-4382.
- Kahrolsun Komünizm Diye Diye Globalleşme. Istanbul: Inkilap Kitabevi. 1999. p. 149. ISBN 978-975-101-5334.
- Kullar ve Sultanlar. Istanbul: Inkilap Kitabevi. 2000. p. 174. ISBN 978-975-101-6287.
- İyi ki Şu Köyceğiz Var. Istanbul: Inkilap Kitabevi. 2001. p. 86. ISBN 978-975-101-7369.
- Uçuk. Istanbul: Inkilap Kitabevi. 2004. p. 221. ISBN 978-975-102-2110.
- Alfabe: Anasınıfı, 1. sınıf. Istanbul: Günışığı Kitaplığı. 2004. p. 29. ISBN 978-975-814-2828.
- Aşk, Sanat ve Servet. Istanbul: Inkilap Kitabevi. 2004. p. 280. ISBN 978-975-101-3590.
- Kavak Yelleri ve Kasırgalar. Istanbul: Inkilap Kitabevi. 2004. p. 196. ISBN 978-975-102-1656.
- Kral Öldü Yaşasın Kral. Istanbul: Inkilap Kitabevi. 2005. p. 240. ISBN 978-975-102-3889.
- Kadın, Işık ve Ateş. Istanbul: Inkilap Kitabevi. 2006. p. 183. ISBN 978-975-102-4411.
- Kalem Bahçelerinden Yedi Hayat. Istanbul: Inkilap Kitabevi. 2009. p. 126. ISBN 978-975-102-8372.

In French

- Une poignée de ciel. Translated by Christine Joliet. Paris: Éditions Flammarion. 1976. p. 256. ISBN 978-208-060-8963.
- Whisky. Translated by Julie Pavesi. Paris: Éditions Flammarion. 1978. p. 239.
- Ixe Enseveli Ou Le Petit Jardin. Translated by Julie Pavesi. Paris: Éditions Flammarion. 1980. p. 232. ISBN 978-208-064-2127.
- Etroite surveillance. Paris: Éditions Flammarion. 1975. ISBN 978-208-060-7867.
