= Ahmet Altan =

Turkish journalist and author (born 1950)

- Born: 2 March 1950 (age 76); Ankara, Turkey
- Education: Robert College; Ankara College; Middle East Technical University; Istanbul University
- Occupations: Editor-in-chief and lead columnist of Taraf (2007–2012)
- Children: 2
- Parent: Çetin Altan (father)
- Relatives: Mehmet Altan (brother)
- Website: http://www.taraf.com.tr/ahmet-altan/

Ahmet Hüsrev Altan (born 2 March 1950) is a Turkish journalist and author. A working journalist for more than twenty years, he has served in all stages of the profession, from being a night shift reporter to editor in chief in various newspapers.

== Biography ==
He was born in 1950 in Ankara, Turkey to the notable journalist and writer Çetin Altan as the first of two sons. He is of Kurdish descent on his mother's side. His brother Mehmet Altan is also a journalist, writer and university professor of political economy.

== Career ==
In addition to having written columns in several Turkish newspapers, including Hürriyet, Milliyet and Radikal, Altan has produced news programming for television.

He was fired from Milliyet after writing a column on 17 April 1995 titled "Atakürt", which presented an alternate history of Turkey as a Kurdish state ("Kürdiye") in which ethnic Turks are oppressed and forced to assimilate. For the same column he received a suspended sentence to an imprisonment of 1 year and 8 months and fined about $12'000.

In 2007 he became the founding editor-in-chief and lead columnist of the Taraf, a daily Turkish newspaper, and remained in the position until his resignation in December 2012.

In September 2008, when Altan published an article titled "Oh, My Brother" dedicated to the victims of the Armenian genocide he was charged under Article 301 of the Turkish Penal Code for "denigrating Turkishness". The judicial claim was initiated by the far-right "Great Union Party".

Altan, along with some of his Taraf associates, usually carried a firearm for self-protection.

As the editor of Taraf, Altan was accused of working to silence allegations of the Gülen movement cheating in compulsory public servants' examinations in Turkey to further their power in the state.

On 14 December 2012, Ahmet Altan resigned his post as editor-in-chief of Taraf. His assistant editor Yasemin Çongar, and Neşe Tüzel also stepped down. The next day, the three departing journalists were joined by columnist Hadi Uluengin.

== Prosecution ==
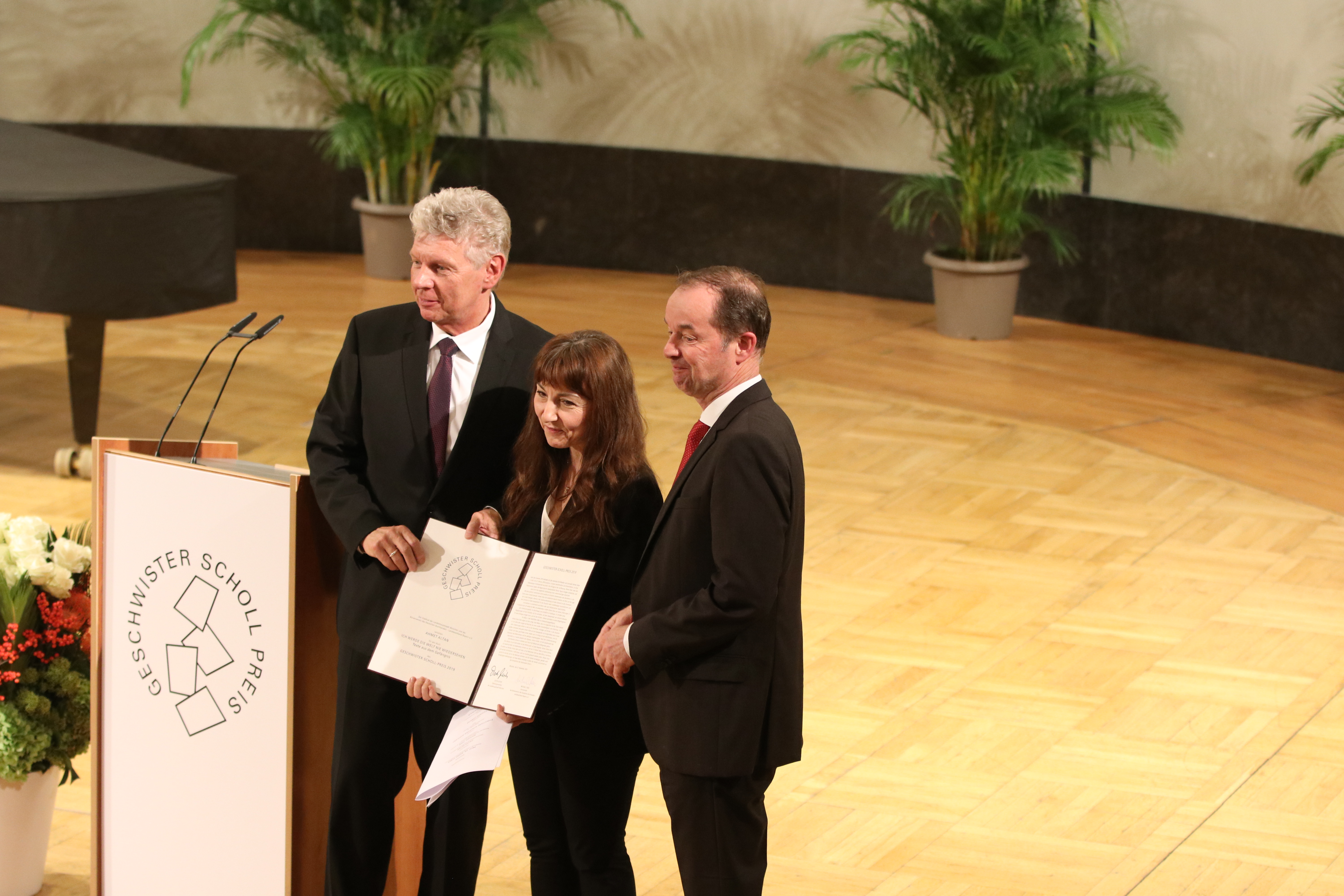
Yasemin Çongar accepts the Geschwister Scholl Prize for Ahmet Altan.

During Turkey's media purge after the failed July 2016 coup d'état on 23 September 2016, Altan was arrested. He was accused of sending "subliminal messages" to encourage 2016 Turkish coup d'état attempt planners.

In September 2017, while banned from written communications, Altan produced an essay The Writer's Paradox in which he says: 'I am writing these words from a prison cell ... But wait. Before you start playing the drums of mercy for me listen to what I will tell you ... They may have the power to imprison me but no one has the power to keep me in prison. I am a writer.' The essay was published on 18 September 2017, on the eve of Altan's trial: in English by The Society of Authors (translated by Yasemin Çongar) and in the original Turkish by English PEN.

As the trial began, many authors spoke out in support of Altan. Neil Gaiman said "I hope that everyone who can read, whatever their politics, reads Ahmet Altan's response to his imprisonment. Repressive regimes hope that if they lock up writers they are also locking up ideas. This will always fail." Joanne Harris said "Writers exist to question, to challenge, sometimes even to ridicule - the status quo. For a government to imprison a writer for doing this is to attack, not only freedom of speech but freedom of the imagination. It is a backward, oppressive and ultimately futile gesture that can only lead to greater and more damaging social unrest."

On 16 February 2018, Ahmet, along with his brother Mehmet Altan, was sentenced to life imprisonment. From prison, he wrote notes he gave to his lawyers, and published his memoirs under the title I Will Never See the World Again, translated into English by Yasemin Çongar. The book was longlisted for the 2019 Baillie Gifford Prize for non-fiction and is published in 17 countries around the world. But it is not published in Turkish as Altan has concern about the safety of the publisher.

On 4 November 2019, Altan was sentenced to 10 years and 6 months imprisonment by the court of cassation, but then the court ordered his release on probation. On 12 November 2019 the police detained him again after a ruling reversing his release.

Altan subsequently stated that "...the CHP hates us because of the Balyoz and Ergenekon trials, and the AKP hates us for calling [him] a dictator..." and that "these things brought me to the point of siding with Atatürk. He [Recep Tayyip Erdoğan] views Atatürk as a rival and takes down his portraits. Today, we find ourselves longing for Atatürk. What is being done to Can Dündar and Cumhuriyet also be done to the CHP.

On 25 November 2019, Altan was awarded the Geschwister Scholl Prize, a literary award of the Bavarian branch of the German Publishers and Booksellers Association.

Altan was released from prison on 14 April 2021 after order by the Court of Cassation.

== Awards ==
- 1983, Akademi Bookstore Literature Awards, First Prize in the category of "Novel"
- 1998, Yunus Nadi Literature Prize in the category of "Novel"
- 2011, International Hrant Dink Award
- 2013, Turkish Publishers Association, Freedom of Thought and Expression Prize
- 2017, Istanbul Human Rights Association Ayşe Nur Zarakolu Freedom of Thought and Expression Prize
- 2019, Geschwister Scholl Preis
- 2021, Prix Femina étranger

== Bibliography ==
=== Memoirs ===
- I will never see the world again, (Other Press, 2019), translated by Yasemin Çongar ISBN 9781783785155

=== Novels ===
- Kılıç Yarası Gibi (1997, Can Yayınları), the first novel in the Ottoman Quartet. Published in English in a translation by Brendan Freely and Yelda Türedi as Like a Sword Wound (2018, Europa Editions)
- Dört Mevsim Sonbahar (Four Seasons of Autumn)
- Yalnızlığın Özel Tarihi (A Private History of Loneliness)
- Sudaki İz (Trace on the Water)
- Aldatmak (Cheating)
- İsyan Günlerinde Aşk (1998, Can Yayınları), the second novel in the Ottoman Quartet.
  - Love in the Days of Rebellion, translation by Brendan Freely and Yelda Türedi (2020, Europa Editions) ISBN 9781787702479
- En Uzun Gece (The Longest Night)
- Tehlikeli Masallar (Dangerous Tales)
- Son Oyun (2013, Everest publications), translated into English by Alexander Dawe and published as Endgame in 2016
- Ölmek Kolaydır Sevmekten (2015, Everest Yayinlari), the third novel in the Ottoman Quartet.
- Hayat Hanım (2021) translated into English by Yasmin Çongar as Lady Life (2023, Other Press)

=== Collections of essays ===
- Gece Yarısı Şarkıları (Midnight Songs)
- İçimizde Bir Yer (Somewhere Inside Us)
- Karanlıkta Sabah Kuşları (Morning Birds in Darkness)
- Kristal Denizaltı (Crystal Submarine)
- Ve Kırar Göğsüne Bastırırken (And He Breaks While Holding Down To His Chest)
