= E-memorandum =

2007 political controversy in Turkey

Screenshot of an e-memorandum (April 27, 2007)

The e-memorandum (Turkish: e-muhtıra) was a controversial set of statements released on the website of the General Staff of the Turkish Armed Forces in April 2007 that weighed in on the Turkish presidential elections in 2007. The way the statements were written caused concerns that the Turkish military would intervene in the election against leading candidate Abdullah Gül in defence of secularism. Turkey's presidential office was regarded as the guardian of the country's secular system; the fact that Gül's wife wore an Islamic headscarf, as well as Gül's own history in political Islam, turned the elections into a political crisis.

== Statement ==
During the crisis, on 27 April 2007, statements were published on Turkish Armed Forces official website regarding the Turkish presidential elections. One statement read:

"The problem that emerged in the presidential election process is focused on arguments over secularism. Turkish Armed Forces are concerned about the recent situation. ... the Turkish Armed Forces are a party in those arguments, and absolute defender of secularism. Also, the Turkish Armed Forces is definitely opposed to those arguments and negative comments. It will display its attitude and action openly and clearly whenever it is necessary ... Those who are opposed to Great Leader Mustafa Kemal Atatürk's understanding 'How happy is the one who says I am a Turk' are enemies of the Republic of Turkey and will remain so. The Turkish Armed Forces maintain their sound determination to carry out their duties stemming from laws to protect the unchangeable characteristics of the Republic of Turkey. Their loyalty to this determination is absolute."

The e-memorandum term was coined by Ural Akbulut to describe the General Staff statement because it was published exclusively online.

== Response from the 59th Government ==
In response to these statements, government spokesman Cemil Çiçek made a speech. He said that the 59th government was sensitive about the secular, democratic, social, and lawful state. Çiçek added that the statements by the Army were considered as against the 59th government.

== International reaction to the e-memorandum ==
- European Union – The European Union has warned Turkey's military not to interfere in politics. EU Enlargement Commissioner Olli Rehn said:

"This is a clear test case whether the Turkish armed forces respect democratic secularization and democratic values... The timing is rather surprising and strange. It's important that the military respects also the rules of the democratic game and its own role in that democratic game."

- United States – The U.S. was also interested in this issue. Dan Fried, assistant secretary of state for European and Eurasian affairs, said: "We don't take sides." However, while answering a question that whether US supported EU's approach Secretary of State Condoleezza Rice said: "The United States fully supports Turkish democracy and its constitutional processes, and that means that the election, the electoral system... have to be upheld. Yes. The answer is yes, the U.S. would be in a similar position", supporting EU's approach.

== Aftermath ==
Abdullah Gül was not elected as the President on the first voting, since the election was almost entirely boycotted by opposition MPs, and a general election was called. In the elections, AKP gained 341 seats and the Nationalist Movement Party (MHP) gained 71 seats. Since MHP did not boycott the election, at least 367 members were present, and Abdullah Gül was elected as the President with AKP's support.

Yaşar Büyükanıt, then Chief of the Turkish General Staff, said that it was him who had written the statement, but he denied that it was a memorandum.

Kemal Kılıçdaroğlu, the leader of the opposition party CHP since 2010, has said that CHP would file a criminal complaint against Büyükanıt for his alleged involvement of the military in democratic elections.

== See also ==
- Politics of Turkey
- 1997 military memorandum (Turkey)
- Coup diary
- 2007 Turkish presidential election
