= Operation Cage Action Plan =

Alleged coup plan by elements of the Turkish military

Operation Cage Action Plan (Turkish: Kafes Operasyonu Eylem Planı) is an alleged coup plan by elements of the Turkish military (specifically, within the Naval Forces Command), which became public in 2009. The plan forms part of the Poyrazköy case of the Ergenekon trials, as the munitions found at Poyrazköy in 2009 are alleged to have been resources belonging to the same group. The indictment listed retired Admiral Ahmet Feyyaz Öğütçü along with two other admirals as the lead organisers.

== Events ==
Prosecutors allege that one of the contributors to the plan is the West Study Group (BÇG) - a group allegedly formed as part of the 1997 "post-modern" coup. According to an Istanbul Police report, the plan was masterminded by İbrahim Şahin and was devised by Ergenekon, and has links with the Zirve Publishing House massacre. Yeni Şafak claimed in 2010 that according to documents retrieved by police, Şener Eruygur had attended Cage Plan meetings.

The plan first came to light when prosecutors were told anonymously of the Rahmi M. Koç Museum finding explosives in the bottom of an exhibited submarine in December 2008. The plan itself was found on a CD seized in the office of retired Major Levent Bektaş. The document was published by Mehmet Baransu in the Taraf newspaper on 19 November 2009. An English translation of it exists. The plan allegedly calls for political terrorism and assassinations to be enacted against various groups of Eastern Orthodox, Armenians, Kurds, Jews and Alevis. The plan apparently originates from secret societies within the Turkish military.

Other documents allegedly relating to the Cage Plan were found at Gölcük Naval Command in 2010. It has been suggested that the plan had already begun to be put into effect when it was exposed: in mid-2009 colored stickers had appeared (and just as suddenly, disappeared) on the doors of hundreds of non-Muslim households in Kurtuluş, an incident that remains unexplained.

Mıgırdiç Margosyan linked the Cage Plan with previous conspiracies, including the provocation of the 1955 Istanbul riots.
