= Yeni Aktüel =

Turkish weekly news magazine

- Categories: News magazine
- Frequency: Weekly
- Publisher: Turkuvaz Media Group
- Founder: Ercan Arıklı
- First issue: 11 July 1991
- Country: Turkey
- Based in: Istanbul
- Language: Turkish
- Website: www.aktuel.com.tr
- ISSN: 1304-8244
- OCLC: 55199589

Yeni Aktüel ("New News" in Turkish; increasingly downplays the "Yeni" and may be referred to simply as Aktüel) is a Turkish weekly news magazine.

== History and profile ==
The magazine was established in 1991 by Ercan Arıklı. The first issue came out on 11 July 1991. Its first editor (1991 - 1995) was Alper Görmüş.
