= Özden Örnek =

Turkish admiral (1943–2018)

Commander of the Turkish Naval Forces
- In office 28 August 2003 – 26 August 2005
- Preceded by: Bülend Alpkaya
- Succeeded by: Yener Karahanoğlu

Personal details
- Born: 2 February 1943 İzmit, Turkey
- Died: 29 April 2018 (aged 75)

Military service
- Allegiance: Turkey
- Branch/service: Turkish Naval Forces
- Years of service: 1962–2005
- Rank: Admiral

Özden Örnek (2 February 1943, İzmit – 29 April 2018) was a Turkish admiral. He was the Commander of the Turkish Naval Forces from 2003 to 2005. In 2012 Örnek was sentenced to twenty years in prison for his alleged role in the 2003 "Sledgehammer" coup plan.

In 2007, the Nokta weekly published portions of a diary purportedly belonging to the Örnek, indicating that four other coup plans were prepared: Sarıkız (blonde girl; idiomatic for 'cow'), Ayışığı (moonlight), Yakamoz (Sea Sparkle), and Eldiven (glove). Admiral Örnek himself called the diary a forgery. The Armed Forces has prevaricated on this issue without denying its authenticity altogether.

In 2015, he was acquitted after the case's prosecutor argued that digital data in the files submitted as evidence in the case was "fake" and did not constitute evidence.

He is the father of film director Tolga Örnek.

Preceded by Bulent Alpkaya	Commander-in-Chief of the Turkish Navy; 30 August 2003 – 26 August 2005	Succeeded by Yener Karahanoğlu
