= Montreux Declaration =

The Montreux Declaration (Turkish: Montrö Bildirisi; also called the April 4 Declaration or the 103 Retired Admirals Declaration) was a 2021 document, signed by 103 retired admirals and one retired general, published publicly, expressing opposition to changes to the Montreux Convention Regarding the Regime of the Straits.

The Speaker of the Turkish Assembly had said that the President of Turkey could, legally and unilaterally, withdraw Turkey from the 1936 Montreux Convention, an international agreement declaring that in peacetime all civilian ships of all countries could freely traverse the Turkish Straits, and some warships also but subject to various strict constraints. The Convention thus effectively neutralized the Straits, even though they are Turkish internal waters, and settled the fraught Straits Question to the satisfaction of the various European powers.

The admirals, aghast, published the Declaration sternly warning against even contemplating this, and to lesser extent dealing with other matters, and declaring their steadfast support of Kemalism. Being retired, the admirals commanded no military units, but even so some observers likened the document to Turkish Military Memorandums of past times, which had threatened coup d'états.

The declaration was strongly denounced by Turkish leaders from the President on down, and many Turkish entities (such as universities, unions, and so forth) filed criminal charges against the signers. Ten of the admirals were immediately detained, although all were released on parole after a few days, and no criminal charges were filed.
