= Mehmet Altan =

Turkish economist and journalist (born 1953)

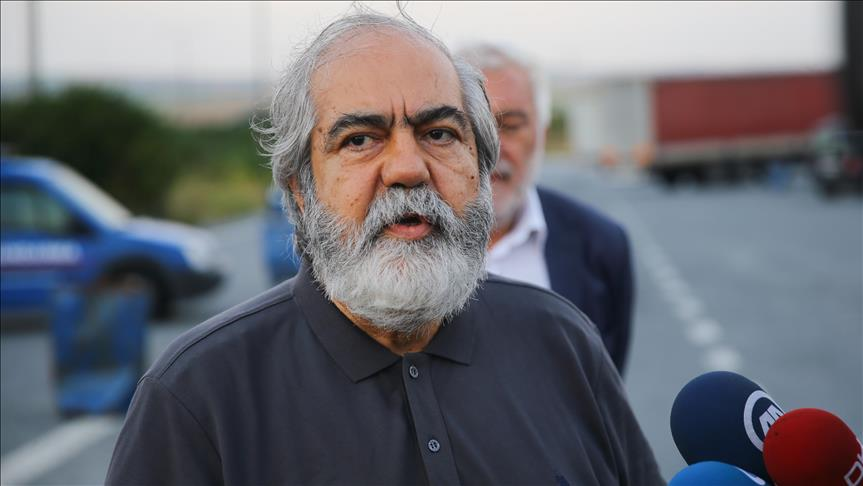
- Born: Mehmet Hasan Altan; 11 January 1953 (age 73); Ankara, Turkey
- Education: Sorbonne University
- Occupations: Academic economist, journalist, and author
- Parent: Çetin Altan (father)
- Relatives: Ahmet Altan (brother)

Mehmet Hasan Altan (born 11 January 1953) is a Turkish academic economist, journalist, and author of over 25 books. Describing himself as a "Marxist-liberal", he is the originator of the term "Second Republic", arguing that Turkey needs to reconstitute its republic as a true democracy. He is a strong supporter of the Accession of Turkey to the European Union.

== Background ==
He was born in 1953 in Ankara, Turkey to the journalist and writer Çetin Altan as the second of two sons. He is of Kurdish descent on his mother's side. His brother Ahmet Altan is also a journalist and writer.

Altan studied at the Sorbonne University from 1979 to 1984, completing masters and doctoral degrees in economics.

== Career ==
Altan has worked faculty of economics of the Istanbul University since 1986 becoming an associate professor in 1987 and a full professor in 1993. He was dismissed in the aftermath of the failed coup d'état attempt of 2016 and wasn't re-hired since.

From 1987 to November 2006 he contributed to Sabah, before moving to Star, becoming editor-in-chief. He left Star in January 2012. He has been dismissed from his paper because of government's pressures on media.

== Prosecution ==
On 10 September 2016, Altan was arrested in the wake of the coup d'état attempt. He was later indicted on charges of attempting to overthrow the constitutional order and acting on behalf of a terrorist organization. The Constitutional Court of Turkey ruled on 11 January 2018 that his rights as a journalist had been violated, but his subsequent application for release was rejected by Istanbul Assize Court. On 16 February 2018 he was sentenced to life in prison. In response to this, on 20 March 2018, the European Court of Human Rights (ECHR) made a ruling that determined that his rights under the European Convention on Human Rights had been violated, namely Article, namely Article 5 § 1 (right to liberty and security) and Article 10 (freedom of expression). He was sentenced to life in prison for terror related charges in February 2018 because the day before the Turkish coup d`état attempt 2016, according to Reuters he said on television: “Whatever the developments were that led to military coups in Turkey, by making the same decisions, Erdogan is paving the same path”. On 27 June 2018 he was released pending trial.

== Views ==
He is the creator of the term "Second Republic", which advocates for the re-founding of Turkey with democracy. He criticized Robert Spano, the president of the ECHR, for his acceptance of an honorary Doctorate by the Istanbul University from the same people who have dismissed him in 2016.

== Publications ==
- Kanatlı Karınca, Nisan Yayınları 1985
- Süperler ve Türkiye, AFA Yayınları 1986
- Marks'tan Sevgilerle, Güneş Yayınları 1989
- Darbelerin Ekonomisi (1990)
- Kapitalizm bu köye uğramadı
- Kurtler: Seytan Soyundan Mi?
- İkinci Cumhuriyet'in Yol Hikayesi
- Puslu Demokrasi : Ergenekon Güncesi
- Marksist Liberal
- Kent Dindarlığı
- Metropolis İslam, Timas Publishing Group. ISBN 978-605-114-108-4
