= Ural Akbulut =

Turkish academic

Ural Akbulut (born 1945) is a professor of chemistry at Middle East Technical University (METU) and served as the university's rector from 2002 to 2008.

== Early life ==
Akbulut completed his undergraduate and master's degrees at Middle East Technical University (METU) in 1970 before earning his doctorate at the University of South Florida in 1973.

== Rectorship ==
During his presidency at METU, he was involved in a public debate with Melih Gökçek regarding Ankara's water issues. He also coined the term "e-memorandum" to describe the military statements published on the Turkish Armed Forces' website concerning the 2007 Turkish presidential election. Currently, he works as a columnist for the Milliyet newspaper.

== Administrative positions ==
- Vice Chair of the Chemistry Department, METU (1982–1985)
- Vice Dean of the Faculty of Science, Ankara University (1985–1986)
- Dean of the Faculty of Pharmacy, Ankara University (1986)
- Vice Rector, Ankara University (1986–1987)
- Secretary-General, METU (1990–1992)
- Vice Rector, METU (1992–2000)
- Rector, METU (2000–2008)

== Awards ==
- Scientific and Technological Research Council of Turkey Encouragement Award (1985)
- United States Benz Alumni Award (1996)
- Turkish Chemical Society Service Award (2001)
- Order of Merit of the Italian Republic (2006)
- ANGİAD Educator of the Year Award (2007)
- Lions International Achievement Award (2008)
- Hyogo Prefecture International Achievement Award (2009)
