= Çetin Doğan =

Turkish military officer (born 1940)

- Born: May 15, 1940 (age 86); Maçka, Turkey
- Relatives: Dani Rodrik (son-in-law)
- Military career
- Allegiance: Turkey
- Branch: Turkish Land Forces
- Service years: 1960–2003
- Rank: General
- Commands: First Army; Aegean Army

Çetin Doğan (born 15 May 1940 in Maçka) is a Turkish military officer. He was Commander of the First Army of Turkey (17 August 2001 – 20 August 2003).

Doğan graduated from the Turkish Military Academy in 1960.

In 2007, Doğan was appointed head of the Board of Trustees of Ahmet Yesevi University by President Ahmet Necdet Sezer. He was replaced in March 2008 by new President Abdullah Gül.

Doğan has written columns for the Aydınlık newspaper since May 2011, and published two books.

== Operation Sledgehammer ==
In 2012, he was sentenced to twenty years in prison for his alleged involvement in the 2003 "Sledgehammer" coup plan; Doğan is said to have been the leader of the group that planned the coup. He was later acquitted in 2015. He is also charged in the case of the 1997 military memorandum.

Professor Dani Rodrik (Doğan's son-in-law) has written that the Sledgehammer evidence against Doğan was fabricated, citing various anachronisms and errors in the key coup plan document.

== Books ==
- Ateşi ve İhaneti Gördük, Kastaş Yayınları 2010. ISBN 9789752821408
- İddianamem: Balyoz ve Gerçekler, Destek Yayınları 2011. ISBN 9786054455348
