= Sledgehammer (alleged coup plan) =

2003–2015 Turkish legal affair

Operation Sledgehammer (Turkish: Balyoz Harekâtı) is the name of an alleged Turkish secularist military coup plan dating back to 2003, in response to the Justice and Development Party (AKP) gaining office.

Claims of the plot first surfaced in the liberal Taraf newspaper, which was passed documents detailing plans to bomb two Istanbul mosques and accuse Greece of shooting down a Turkish aircraft over the Aegean Sea. The plan was to stir up chaos and justify a military coup. The army said the plans had been discussed but only as part of a scenario-based planning exercise at a military seminar.

The case was heavily criticised by the political opposition for the suspected involvement of high-ranking bureaucrats and legal officials which were close to the Cemaat movement, an Islamist movement led by exiled cleric and (then) AKP ally Fethullah Gülen. Numerous legal flaws and improper procedures throughout the case, and the lack of a response by the government also drew concern. This included the case that the original Sledgehammer document, claimed to have been produced in 2003, was actually created using Microsoft Word 2007. Other irregularities included the forging of signatures of high-ranking military officers, such as that of General Çetin Doğan.

In 2012 some 300 of the 365 suspects were sentenced to prison terms, while 34 suspects were acquitted. The case was to be appealed.

On 19 June 2014 all the accused were ordered released from prison, pending a retrial, after a finding by the Constitutional Court that their rights had been violated. The timing of the decision fuelled further accusations regarding the involvement of the Cemaat movement initially, since by 2014 the AKP and Gülen had fallen out with each other. Furthermore, the then-AKP Prime Minister Recep Tayyip Erdoğan openly accused the Cemaat movement of infiltrating the judiciary following a government corruption scandal, beginning a large-scale operation of either removing or relocating judicial and law enforcement employees.

On 31 March 2015 all 236 suspects were acquitted after the case's prosecutor argued that digital data in the files submitted as evidence in the case were faked and did not constitute evidence.

== Plot claims ==
Reports of the alleged plot first surfaced in the liberal Taraf newspaper on 20 January 2010. Journalist Mehmet Baransu said he had been passed documents detailing plans to bomb two Istanbul mosques and accuse Greece of shooting down a Turkish plane over the Aegean Sea. The plan was to stir up chaos and justify a military coup.

The extensive materials received by Taraf, which were passed to prosecutors, formed the bulk of the prosecution case.

== Arrests ==
On 21 February 2010 operations were carried out in nine provinces. 49 people were detained including admirals, generals and colonels, some of them retired. On 23 February six of them were released, but seven were arrested. Another five suspects were arrested on 24 February. Further detentions and arrests followed, but at the beginning of April 2010 the number of people in pre-trial detention had dropped to nine, while 35 arrested suspects had been released, including prime suspect retired general Çetin Doğan, who had been the commander of the First Army. On 31 March and 1 April, 28 suspects in the investigation were released. A judge released 19 of the suspects due to the "existence of serious doubt regarding the crime". 9 others were released due to their "social standing."

On 5 April 2010 an additional 95 people (including 86 military personnel, 70 of them on active duty), were detained in 14 provinces on the same day. Nine suspects released earlier were rearrested on 6 April. However, Istanbul's chief prosecutor, Aykut Cengiz Engin, ordered the removal of prosecutors Mehmet Berk and Bilal Bayraktar from the probe as his order "any detention decision should not be taken without my approval" was not abided by. On 6 April Engin also replaced coordinating prosecutor of the investigation Süleyman Pehlivan with Mehmet Ergül.

In May and June 2011 another round of interrogations followed resulting in the arrest of 15 members of the Turkish Armed Forces. The arrests are based on documents reportedly seized in February from a house that belonged to Col. Hakan Büyük's son. The new evidence consists of written documents, video files and digital material on a flash disk, and includes plans to be put into action if the coup attempt were to fail.

== Trial ==
The trial started on 16 December 2010 with the first court hearing, held in the court house of Silivri Prison. The presiding judge, Ömer Diken, was appointed only two days earlier, after the previous presiding judge was removed because of an ongoing disciplinary investigation. 187 defendants were present. Nine defendants including retired General Ergin Saygun had not appeared. None of the defendants were in pre-trial detention.

After the hearing of 11 February 2011 the court decided to arrest 163 defendants. Meanwhile, the court room in Silivri Prison was extended.

On 20 February 2011 an additional indictment was forwarded to Istanbul Heavy Penal Court 10. It charged 28 defendants, 15 of them in pre-trial detention in connection with documents found at the home of Colonel Hakan Büyük's son with "the attempt to remove the government of the Turkish Republic" and demanded sentences between 15 and 20 years' imprisonment. In case that the indictment is accepted the case may be merged with the main Sledgehammer (Balyoz) case in which 196 defendants are on trial.

On 29 July 2011 the court charged 22 suspects. On the same day the chief of the Turkish armed forces, Işık Koşaner, has resigned along with the army, navy and air force heads. Koşaner portrayed his resignation as a protest at the jailing of military officers. "It has become impossible for me to continue in this high office, because I am unable to fulfil my responsibility to protect the rights of my personnel as the chief of general staff," Koşaner said. Prime Minister Recep Tayyip Erdoğan accepted the resignations and appointed Necdet Özel as the chief of the armed forces. The decision stamped the civilian authority on the country's military, which has long regarded itself as a protector of Turkey's secular traditions."This is effectively the end of the military’s role in Turkish democracy," said Asli Aydintasbas, a columnist for the Turkish daily newspaper Milliyet. "This is the symbolic moment where the first Turkish republic ends and the second republic begins."

On 15 August 2011 Istanbul Heavy Penal Court 10 held the first hearing in the second Balyoz trial. 26 defendants were present, 21 of them in pre-trial detention. Prime suspect General Bilgin Balanlı read out a 4-page defence pleading not guilty. The demand to recuse the court was sent to Istanbul Heavy Penal Court 11. The hearing was adjourned to 3 October 2011.

In mid-November 2011 a third 264-page indictment was sent to Istanbul Heavy Penal Court 10, accusing 143 suspects, 66 of them in pre-trial detention with an attempt to overthrow the government. The prosecutor demanded to combine trial 1 and 2 with this case. After the cases 1 and 2 had been combined the number of defendants had increased to 244, 184 of them in pre-trial detention. Should this case also be merged the number of defendants will be 367.

== Comments on the trial ==
When on 5 April 2011 the Court rejected the demands for release for the second time, the General Staff of the Turkish Armed Forces issued a press release. Reminding that the Turkish Armed Forces repeatedly informed on the seminars in question and the expert opinion the prosecutor's office had demanded it was hard to understand why the court had ordered the continuation of pre-trial detention. Mehmet Ali Şahin, President of the Grand National Assembly of Turkey, stated that the press release casts a doubt in the judiciary in Turkey. Deputy President of the AKP, Hüseyin Çelik called this an interference in an ongoing trial. US Ambassador to Ankara Francis J. Ricciardone stated that a transparent trial was expected and he tried to understand, how freedom of press could be discussed, when journalists were being arrested. Hüseyin Çelik called this an interference into internal affairs.

Dani Rodrik and Pinar Doğan, son-in-law and daughter of chief suspect Çetin Doğan, stated, "what lies behind the trials is an apparent effort to discredit the government’s opponents on the basis of the flimsiest evidence and often, far worse, by framing them with planted evidence and forged documents" in their personal blog page. Commenting on all investigations in the Ergenekon cases they alleged: the key evidence is typically produced by anonymous informants; they provide the "originals" of secret documents detailing criminal activities and these revelations are followed by selective leaks to the media about the "evidence".

Against this Fevzi Bilgin, Assistant Professor of Political Science, St. Mary's College of Maryland held, "Mr. Rodnik’s interpretation and presentation of the case is neither unbiased nor genuinely informational. It is also a platform to internationalize the grievances of the current military establishment in Turkey and defame the current government as being religiously motivated." In his opinion "It is rather likely that Sledgehammer was the first coup plan devised right after AKP’s victory in the parliamentary elections on 3 November 2002."

On 16 January 2013 Mr. Orhan Aykut confessed to the Aydınlık newspaper that together with Mr. İhsan Arslan (AKP deputy at the time) they received a suitcase of real Balyoz Seminar documents from Mr. Iskender Pala (who was expelled from the Turkish Navy for not being secular) at Movenpick Hotel in Istanbul in 2007 and using these documents they had created fake evidences with a group of specialists in Ankara to be used in Balyoz Case.

== Verdict ==
On 21 September 2012 Istanbul Heavy Penal Court announced its verdict. Some 300 of the 365 suspects were sentenced to prison terms, while 34 suspects were acquitted. Three retired generals were sentenced to aggravated life imprisonment: Çetin Doğan (retired 1st Army Cmdr. General), İbrahim Fırtına (Air Force Cmdr. retired General) and Özden Örnek (retired Navy Cmdr. Adm.) on charges of "attempting to overthrow the government by force" but the terms were later reduced to 20 years' because of the "incomplete attempt at staging a coup". In the case of 78 defendants (including Engin Alan) the court commuted aggravated life imprisonment to 18 years' imprisonment. While 214 defendants received sentences of 16 years' imprisonment, one defendant was sentenced to six years' imprisonment. The court separated the case of three defendants and dropped charges for one defendant. Arrest warrants against 250 defendants in pre-trial detention were prolonged. In addition, six arrest warrants were issued against defendants attending the hearing and 69 decisions on apprehension were issued against defendants who had not come to the hearing.

The verdict was to be appealed.

The Constitutional Court of Turkey found in 2014 that the defendants' rights had been infringed during the judicial process, which triggered to which in 2021, the Court of Cassation (Turkey) reversed the verdict because key pieces of evidence in the indictment were found to be fabricated, and the forensic experts handling the material were indicted. Certain word documents contained fonts that were anachronistic, and Süha Tanyeri's handwriting had been copied from his personal notepad to fabricate evidence. Other irregularities included a coup plan drafted in 2003 making an assignment to TCG Alanya (a navy ship), which did not exist until 2005. The plan also made references to companies that did not exist in 2003, and CCTV systems that did not exist in 2003.

== Fair trial intervention ==
In 2013 the President and Board of the Istanbul Bar Association were charged with attempting to influence members of the judiciary in the trial, after they had intervened in a 2012 hearing to demand a fair trial. The European Association of Lawyers for Democracy & World Human Rights said their intervention was legal and approved by the Presiding Judge at the time.

== Key actors ==
- General Aytaç Yalman (Commander of the Turkish Army, 2002 - 2004)
- General Çetin Doğan (Commander of the First Army, 2001 - 2003)
- Admiral Özden Örnek (Commander of the Turkish Naval Forces, 2003 - 2005)
- General İbrahim Fırtına (Commander of the Turkish Air Force, 2003 - 2005)
- General Engin Alan (Chief of the Special Forces of the Turkish Army, 1996 - 2000)
- General Şükrü Sarıışık (Secretary-General of the National Security Council, 2003 - 2004)

== See also ==
- Deep state in Turkey
- Sarıkız, Ayışığı, Yakamoz and Eldiven
- Ergenekon (allegation)
