= Mustafa Levent Göktaş =

Turkish colonel (born 1959)

- Born: Mustafa Levent Göktaş; June 8, 1959 (age 67); Erbaa, Tokat, Turkey
- Children: 2
- Military career
- Allegiance: Turkey
- Branch: Turkish Land Forces
- Service years: 1980–2005
- Rank: Colonel
- Other work: Lawyer

Mustafa Levent Göktaş (born June 8, 1959) is a Turkish colonel, who took part in the 1999 operation to capture Abdullah Öcalan, the leader of the Kurdish terrorist organization PKK, designated as a terrorist organisation in Turkey. In January 2009, Göktaş was detained in the Ergenekon investigation. Göktaş was released on 10 March 2014, along with other Ergenekon defendants.

He is a member of the Special Forces Command (Turkish: Özel Kuvvetler Komutanlığı); an elite special forces unit of the Turkish Armed Forces.
