= Yasemin Çongar =

Turkish journalist, writer, and translator

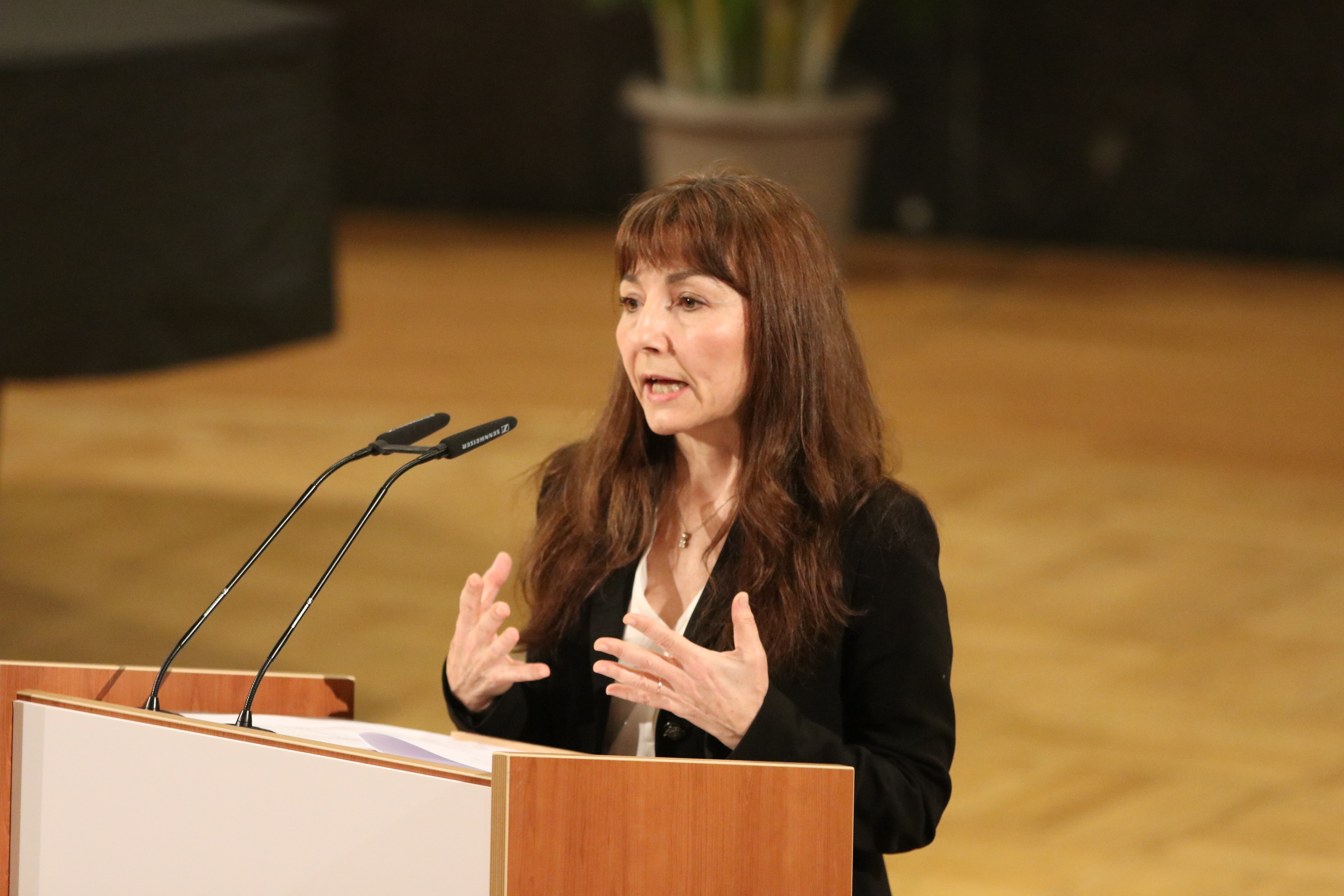
- Born: December 22, 1966 (age 59); Turkey
- Education: Ankara University, Georgetown University
- Occupations: Journalist, writer, translator
- Spouse: M. Chris Mason
- Children: Hannah Çongar Mason
- Writing career
- Years active: 1984-present

Yasemin Çongar (born 22 December 1966) is a Turkish journalist, writer, and translator. She is the daughter of late Turkish concert pianist Gulay Ugurata.

== Life ==
She started journalism in Turkey at the foreign news desk of Anka News Agency in 1984, the year she graduated from Minneapolis South High School where she was an exchange student. She later graduated from Ankara University with a BA in Economics and the Georgetown University with an MALS (conc. American Studies).

During her years in college she wrote for the Turkish journals, Tomorrow and Science and Art, which were associated to the Workers Party of Turkey. She was on the editorial team that brought out Tomorrow. During this period, she was tried and acquitted on charges of "propagandizing for communism" via translating a book by Alexandra Kollontai.

She worked for five years (1984-1989) as a diplomatic reporter at ANKA. Later, she became the diplomatic correspondent at the Turkish daily newspaper Cumhuriyet, which was at the time under the direction of Hasan Cemal .

In the early 1990s and, she went to London and worked as a World Service producer at the BBC. After returning to Turkey from London, she worked as a manager in the Strategy-Mori research company in Istanbul. Later, she left and joined the staff that prepared the Yeni Yüzyıl newspaper.

In January 1995, she became the Washington bureau chief and columnist of the Turkish daily Milliyet . She worked as a journalist in the U.S. from 1995 to mid-2007. In 2007, her exclusive interviews were published with novelists such as Orhan Pamuk, Paul Auster and Salman Rushdie. Çongar, was also the Washington representative of CNN Türk, and presented a monthly program called "This is Washington" on that channel. She left Milliyet and CNN Türk in November 2007 to help launch the newspaper Taraf'', where she worked for five years as Deputy Editor-in-Chief and columnist. She wrote articles on the political agenda in her columns called "Ya Da (Or)" and literary essays in her column "Ex Libris".

In 2008, Çongar was among the first participants of the I Apologize campaign.

On 14 December 2012, she resigned from her position at the newspaper Taraf, together with the newspaper's chief editor Ahmet Altan. Çongar founded the NGO called Punto24 (P24 / Independent Platform for Journalism) with Hasan Cemal, Doğan Akın and Yavuz Baydar in 2013. She served as the director of P24 for nine years from 2013 to 2022, during which time she also became the founder of a Turkish online literary review K24 in 2015 and the Istanbul Literature House, Kiraathane, in 2018, where she was the founding director until March 2023.

Her work appeared in Al-Monitor.

In 2022, she was convicted of "exposing state secrets", a verdict which was later overturned, a retrial of the case is ongoing as of 2024.

Çongar's interview with the Italian novelist Elena Ferrante was published in the latter's collection of essays and interviews, Farantumaglia. Over the years, Çongar's interviews with writers such as Günter Grass, Colson Whitehead, Jenny Erpenbeck, Adania Shibli, Hisham Matar and others were published in Turkey.

== Works ==
- Çok Sevdiklerimiz, Yarım Bıraktıklarımız (Literary essays)
- İnşaata Girmek Tehlikeli ve Mubahtır (Literary essays)
- İsyan ve Yerçekimi (Literary essays)
- Artık Sır Değil: Amerikan Gizli Telgraflarında Türkiye (Journalism)

== Translations ==
(From the Turkish)

- Ahmet Altan I Will Never See the World Again
- Ahmet Altan Lady Life
