= Şener Eruygur =

Turkish general (1941–2023)

General Commander of the Gendarmerie of Turkey
- In office 27 August 2002 – 26 August 2004
- Preceded by: Aytaç Yalman
- Succeeded by: Fevzi Türkeri

Personal details
- Born: 17 June 1941 Erzurum, Turkey
- Died: 20 February 2023 (aged 81) Istanbul, Turkey
- Resting place: Karacaahmet Cemetery

Military service
- Allegiance: Turkey
- Branch/service: Turkish Army
- Years of service: 1960–2004
- Rank: 25px General
- Unit: Army Aviation Corps

Mehmet Şener Eruygur (17 June 1941 – 20 February 2023) was a Turkish army general. He was general commander of the gendarmerie from 2002 to 2004, and was later head of the Atatürk Thought Association. He graduated from the Turkish Military Academy in 1960.

Eruygur was born on 17 June 1941. He was one of those charged in the Ergenekon trials due to their alleged participation in the Sarıkız, Ayışığı, Yakamoz and Eldiven 2004 coup plans; in August 2013 he was sentenced to aggravated life imprisonment.

Eruygur was also accused of establishing the Republican Working Group (CÇG), an illegal organization similar to the Batı Çalışma Grubu (BÇG, West Working Group).

Eruygur died on 20 February 2023, at the age of 81. He was buried one day later at Karacaahmet Cemetery.
