= İbrahim Fırtına =

Turkish general (born 1941)

Halil İbrahim Fırtına
- Born: 1941 (age 84–85); Ordu, Turkey
- Military career
- Allegiance: Turkey
- Branch: Turkish Air Force
- Service years: 1962–2005
- Rank: General
- Commands: Turkish Air Force
- Conflicts: Turkish invasion of Cyprus

Halil İbrahim Fırtına (born 1941 in Ordu, Turkey) is a retired Turkish Air Force general and Commander of the Turkish Air Force.

Fırtına retired in 2005. He was tried in the alleged "Sledgehammer" coup plan conspiracy by senior members of the Turkish armed forces.

Fırtına was awarded with Legion d'honneur in 2006, but he declined the award.

Military offices
Preceded by Cumhur Asparuk	Commander of the Turkish Air Force; August 27, 2003–August 25, 2005	Succeeded by Faruk Cömert
