= Torture in Turkey =

The widespread and systematic use of torture in Turkey goes back to the Ottoman Empire. After the foundation of the Republic of Turkey, torture of civilians by the Turkish Armed Forces and Turkish police was widespread during the Dersim rebellion. The Sansaryan Han police headquarters and Harbiye Military Prison in Istanbul became known for torture in the 1940s. Amnesty International (AI) first documented Turkish torture after the 1971 Turkish coup d'état and has continued to issue critical reports, particularly after the outbreak of the Kurdish–Turkish conflict in the 1980s. The Committee for the Prevention of Torture has issued critical reports on the extent of torture in Turkey since the 1990s. The Stockholm Center for Freedom published a report entitled Mass Torture and Ill-Treatment in Turkey in June 2017. The Human Rights Foundation of Turkey estimates there are around one million victims of torture in Turkey.

== History ==
The history of torture goes back to the Ottoman Empire. The Committee of Union and Progress used the place known as the Bekirağa Bölüğü (Military Company of Bekir Agha) situated in the building that now houses the Istanbul University as a special torture place. Almost all dissidents came here once. Deputy Rıza Nur was tortured here in 1910. He raised torture allegations in parliament. The demand to establish a commission to investigate the torture allegations was turned down by 96 against 73 votes.

After the foundation of the Turkish Republic in 1923 Sansaryan Han and the Harbiye Military Prison became the symbols for torture. Having been built in Sirkeci in 1895 Sansaryan Han became the police headquarters of Istanbul in 1944. People that were tortured here include poet and writer Attilâ İlhan, Nihat Sargın, former chair of the Workers Party of Turkey and poet Nâzım Hikmet. During the Racism-Turanism trials, 23 nationalists, including Nihal Atsız, Zeki Velidi Togan, Nejdet Sançar and others, were tortured between 1944 and 1945. In 1945 the military prison in Istanbul moved from Tophane to Harbiye. In one section 40 cells were built measuring 1,5 by 2 metres. Alleged members of the Communist Party of Turkey (TKP) were held here as well as the 40 of 49 Kurds that had been detained in 1959 (de:Prozess der 49). They were held here for 195 days. Twenty-four prisoners allegedly died because of the bad conditions they had been held in. In Harbiye Military Prison members of the extreme right Grey Wolves (ülkücü) were tortured after the 1980 Turkish coup d'état. Besides bastinado (falaka) and rough beatings, prisoners would be held in narrow dark cells often called "coffin" (tabutluk) or isolation (tecrit).

=== Torture after March 12 ===
After the 1971 Turkish coup d'état torture was applied in police centres and centres of the Counter-Guerrilla that were jointly used by the secret service called National Intelligence Organization and the Special Warfare Department (Turkish: Özel Harp Dairesi, ÖHD). The torture methods included electric shocks applied by field telephones various forms of hanging, falaka, rape, sleep and food deprivation and torturing relatives in the presence of the suspect.

The military applied torture to political prisoners as a matter of policy. Affidavits confirmed that martial law commanders, military prosecutors and judicial advisors gave order to torture political prisoners, sometime supervising it.

=== The Ziverbey Estate ===
The Ziverbey Estate (Ziverbey Köşkü) is a place in İstanbul-Erenköy which was used as a torture centre especially during the 12 March period. At the Ziverbey Estate well known people such as the journalists İlhan Selçuk, Doğan Avcıoğlu, Uğur Mumcu and İlhami Soysal were tortured.

See also

- Report of Talat Turhan to the CHP / First published on 1 May 1976
- Serdar Çelik: Turkey's Killing Machine: The Contra-Guerrilla Force

=== Torture after the 1980 coup ===
Over a quarter of a million people were arrested in Turkey on political grounds since 1980 and almost all of them were tortured. The Human Rights Association (HRA), founded in 1986 put the figure at 650,000 and in 2008 the Human Rights Foundation of Turkey (HRFT) spoke of one million victims of torture in Turkey.

One of the first measures after the 1980 coup d'état was to extend the maximum period of detention from 15 to 30 and then to 90 days. (see the relevant section below). Amnesty International has repeatedly documented that, in practice, incommunicado detention is often longer than legally permitted. Specialized teams in İstanbul, Ankara and Diyarbakır were responsible for the interrogation of specific organizations and groups. İsmail Hakkı, for instance, said that between 1979 and 1985 he worked in the place called political department (at the time "first department") of Istanbul Police HQ in the "K" section (which may be the abbreviation of komünist = communist), the "group for interrogation and operations against illegal organizations" and later at the same place in Erzurum. All people in that wing were professionals. They could guess what organization had carried out which action just because of the way it was carried out and the way the militants had escaped.

In the 1980s particularly Amnesty International issued many reports and urgent actions related to allegations of torture in Turkey. Some quotes are:

- May 1984, File on Torture: "The Turkish authorities have persisted in the torture of prisoners during the present decade."
- July 1985, Testimony on Torture: "Torture is widespread and systematic in Turkey."
- February 1986, Violations of Human Rights in Turkey: Political prisoners and common criminals are tortured or subjected to cruel, inhuman or degrading treatment or punishment, while in police custody."
- July 1987, Continuing Violations of Human Rights in Turkey: "AI continues to be concerned about the imprisonment of prisoners of conscience, systematic torture and ill-treatment of political prisoners..."

Besides Amnesty International NGOs such as the International Commission of Jurists and the International Federation of Human Rights and international bodies like the Council of Europe sent delegations to Turkey to investigate the torture claims. On 1 July 1982 five States (Denmark, Norway, Sweden, France and the Netherlands) filed an application against Turkey with the European Commission of Human Rights. They complained in particular about torture, unfair trials and restriction of freedom of expression. In December 1985 a friendly settlement was reached that asked Turkey to shorten the detention period, lift martial law and present periodic reports. Turkey had shortened the maximum length of detention in May and June 1985 from 45 days to 30 days in areas under emergency legislation and to 15 days in areas not under extraordinary rule. Later the European Committee for the Prevention of Torture (CPT) became the main body to monitor the situation, but other bodies such as the UN Special Rapporteur on Torture (see the section on reports) also visited Turkey in order to evaluate the risk of torture in Turkey.

=== Torture after the 2016 coup d'état attempt ===
According to Amnesty International, detainees in Turkey are being subjected to beatings and torture, including rape, after the failed coup attempt. Police held detainees in stress positions, denied them food, water and medical treatment. Detainees were verbally abused, threatened as well as subjected to beatings and torture, including rape and sexual assault. Plastic zip-ties were often fastened too tight and left wounds on the arms of detainees. In some cases detainees were also blindfolded throughout their detention. In addition, detainees have been denied access to lawyers and family members and have not been properly informed of the charges against them, undermining their right to a fair trial. In general, it appears that the worst treatment in detention was reserved for higher-ranking military officers. Amnesty International said it wanted the European Committee for the Prevention of Torture to send people to check on detainees conditions. A person who had been on duty at the Ankara police headquarters claimed that police denied medical treatment to a detainee. "Let him die. We will say he came to us dead," the witness quoted a police doctor as saying. Some of the detainees were in extreme emotional distress, with one detainee attempting to throw himself out of a sixth story window and another repeatedly slamming his head against the wall.

The Turkish President Recep Tayyip Erdoğan extended the maximum period of detention for suspects from four days to 30, a move Amnesty said increased the risk of torture or other maltreatment of detainees.

In a detailed research that cited torture cases across Turkey's prisons and detention centers, Stockholm Center for Freedom revealed that the torture, ill-treatment, abusive, inhuman and degrading treatment of people who are deprived of their liberties in Turkey's detention centers and prisons after July 15, 2016, coup bid have become a norm rather than an exception under increased nationalistic euphoria and religious zealotry in the country.

The United Nations special rapporteur on torture and other cruel, inhuman or degrading treatment or punishment, Nils Melzer, visited Turkey in 2016. According to his report, though Turkey had laws against torture, they were insufficiently enforced, with investigation of allegations of torture being rare. He reported that he heard many allegations of torture and inhumane treatment. The Turkish government denied these allegations, claiming that they were part of a misinformation campaign by FETÖ, which the Turkish government regards as a terrorist organization.

== Methods ==
Suspects are blindfolded and handcuffed immediately after detention. Even common criminal suspects are stripped naked during interrogation and left like that, often after being hosed with ice-cold water or left on the concrete floors of cells in harsh conditions of winter. The HRA and the Human Rights Foundation of Turkey (HRFT) determined 37 torture techniques, such as electric shock, squeezing the testicles, hanging by the arms or legs, blindfolding, stripping the suspect naked, spraying with high-pressure water, etc. These techniques are used by the special team members and other interrogation teams. Foot whipping (Turkish: falaka) was the method most frequently applied, until Prof. Dr. Veli Lök discovered a method of bone scintigraphy that enabled him to detect effects of it a long time after torture.

There are many more methods applied in Turkey during the past and the present. In the annual reports of the Treatment and Rehabilitation Centres of the Human Rights Foundation the list of methods covers one page. The European Committee for the Prevention of Torture observed that the most severe methods of ill-treatment encountered in the past by CPT delegations has diminished in recent times.

== Deaths in custody ==
In an attempt to obtain detailed information Amnesty International submitted 110 cases to the Turkish authorities between September 1981 and October 1984. On 10 June 1988 AI sent a list with 229 names to the Turkish authorities and in September 1998 received answers on 55 cases. Only after a list of 144 names of prisoners suspected to have died under torture was published in the Turkish press the Turkish authorities provided further information. They indirectly admitted that torture could have caused the death of 40 prisoners. Amnesty International knew of another seven cases in which alleged torturers had been convicted raising the figure of confirmed deaths in custody to 47 between 1980 and 1990.

In September 1994 and September 1995 the HRFT published two reports on Deaths in Custody (14 and 15 years since the military take over) presenting a list of 419 deaths in custody (in 15 years) with a suspicion that torture might have been the reason. Another 15 deaths were attributed to hunger strikes while medical neglect was given as the reason for 26 deaths. On the basis of this list Helmut Oberdiek compiled a revised list for 20 years (12 September 1980 to 12 September 2000) and concluded that in 428 cases torture may have been the reason for the death of prisoners. In 2008 alone the Human Rights Foundation of Turkey reported of 39 deaths in prison. In some cases torture was involved.

In Diyarbakır Prison the PKK member Mazlum Doğan burned himself to death on 21 March 1982 in protest at the treatment in prison. Ferhat Kurtay, Necmi Önen, Mahmut Zengin and Eşref Anyık followed his example on 17 May 1982. On 14 July 1982 the PKK members Kemal Pir, M. Hayri Durmuş, Ali Çiçek and Akif Yılmaz started a hunger strike in Diyarbakır Prison. Kemal Pir died on 7 September 1982, M. Hayri Durmuş on 12 September 1982, Akif Yılmaz on 15 September 1982 and Ali Çiçek on 17 September 1982. On 13 April 1984 a 75-day hunger-strike started in Istanbul. As a result, four prisoners - Abdullah Meral, Haydar Başbağ, Fatih Ökütülmüş and Hasan Telci - died.

Many more prisoners died as a result of hunger strikes and fast-to-death actions. Most deaths occurred during the actions against the isolation in the F-type prisons (12 in 1996 and 61 during the action that started in October 2000 and ended in January 2007).

Some prisoners were beaten to death including:

- İlhan Erdost, on 7 November 1980 in Mamak Military Prison, Ankara
- Ali Sarıbal, on 13 November 1981 in Diyarbakır Military Prison
- Bedii Tan, on 17 May 1982 in Diyarbakır Military Prison
- Necmettin Büyükkaya, on 23 January 1984 in Diyarbakır Military Prison
- Engin Ceber, on 10 October 2008 in Metris Prison, İstanbul

=== Prison massacres ===
More prisoners lost their lives during operations of the security forces in prisons. The incidents include:

Date	Prison	Deaths
12 September 1995	Buca/Izmir	3
4 January 1996	Ümraniye/Istanbul	4
24 September 1996	Diyarbakır	10
26 September 1999	Ulucanlar/Ankara	10
19 December 2000	20 prisons	30

== Legislation ==
The Constitution of 1982 contains the prohibition of torture in the last two sentences of the first paragraph of Article 17: "No one shall be subjected to torture or ill-treatment; no one shall be subjected to penalties or treatment incompatible with human dignity." Similar provisions had been included in previous Constitutions. In the Constitution of 1876 it was Article 26; in the Constitution of 1924 it was Article 73, and in the Constitution of 1961 it was Article 13 (paragraphs 3 and 4).

Torture had been banned in Turkey, even before the Turkish Republic was founded. All Constitutions since 1876 carried provisions against torture. The crime of torture was first defined in Article 103 of the penal code of 1858. Between 1926 and 2005 the Turkish Penal Code (TPC) was Law 765. Two provisions of Law 765 provided for punishment in case of torture (Article 243) or ill-treatment (Article 245). Both offences were entitled "bad treatment of civil servants against citizens".

The first paragraph of Article 243 TPC restricted the offence of torture or cruel, inhuman and degrading treatment to acts aimed at eliciting confession to a crime or in cases of victims or witnesses aimed at influencing the decision to make certain statements or complaints. The maximum sentence was eight years' imprisonment. Article 245 TPC provided for sentences of three months to five years' imprisonment if civil servants entitled to use force or other law enforcement officers resorted to bad treatment or imposed suffering on others beyond the orders of superiors and other rules.

In practice Article 245 TPC was more often used than Article 243 TPC. The figures of the General Directorate of Criminal Registration and Statistics within the Justice Minister indicate that for every four trials under Article 245 TPC there was one trial under Article 243 TC. On 11 January 2003 one paragraph was added to Article 245 TPC providing that sentences passed under Articles 243 or 245 TPC could not be commuted to fines, be made conditional or be suspended. This provision against impunity was not included in the Penal Code of 2005.

The Turkish Penal Code passed on 26 September 2004 as Law 5237 entered into force on 1 June 2005. Like the former Penal Code (Law 765) it included the offence of torture and ill-treatment but added the offence of torment (eziyet). Contrary to the former Penal Code, the Articles against torture and ill-treatment (Articles 94 to 96) were included in the chapter on offences against persons and not against the State.

Like torture the offence of "torment" (suffering) has not been defined. It is left to the interpretation as to which kind of act will fall under Article 94 or Article 96 of Law 5237. A similar distinction existed between Articles 243 and 245 of the former TPC, since the first provision only referred to situations of interrogation aimed at getting a confession. The sentences for torment are very low and if as before, most cases of torture are interpreted as torment not only will the sentences remain low but the possibilities to suspend the sentences increase and the limits for exceeding the time limit will be lower.

The current government has enacted new laws and training to prevent torture, including a policy involving surprise inspections of police stations that was announced in 2008. A government human rights report issued for the first time in 2008 found that the combined category of torture and ill-treatment was the third-most-common complaint in 2007, after property rights and health care.

=== Length of detention ===
Five days after the 1980 Turkish coup d'état the maximum period that person could be held in custody (of police or gendarmerie) was extended from 15 to 30 days. On 7 November 1980 this period was increased to 90 days (3 months), during which time they had no contact to the outside world (incommunicado detention). On 5 September 1981 the maximum period of detention was lowered to 45 days. Between 17 June 1985 and 12 March 1997 the maximum period of incommunicado detention was 15 days (in regions under a state of emergency it could be extended to 30 days). Until 6 February 2002 the maximum detention period for offences dealt with at the State Security Court was seven days (10 days in regions under a state of emergency).

Since 2002 the following rules apply. Article 19 of the Constitution provides in paragraph 5 that the maximum time a person may be kept in detention, apart from the time of transfer to the nearest court, is 48 hours. This period is extended to four days in case of jointly committed offences (the condition of more than three suspects is not mentioned in the Constitution). In the Criminal Procedure Code (Law 1412) that was replaced by new legislation in 2005 the maximum time for detention was determined in Article 128. The Article provided that an apprehended person had to be taken to a judge (if not released) within 24 hours, excluding the time for the transfer to the nearest court. If the apprehended person requested, a lawyer could be present during interrogation. The prosecutor could extend this period to four days if more than three suspects were involved.

The Criminal Procedure Code (Law 5271 as of 1 June 2005) regulates the length of custody in Article 91. Again the maximum length of detention is determined to be 24 hours. Article 90 of Law 5271 maintains the maximum length of detention in cases of commonly committed offences as four days. However, the period can be extended for one day at a time (for a maximum of three times). The order for extension of the time in custody again is given by a prosecutor (not a judge).

For offences that had to be dealt with by State Security Courts (under the new legislation they are called "heavy penal courts authorized according to Article 250 of Law 5271") the maximum period of 24 hours in detention as provided in Article 91 of Law 5271 is set at 48 hours, according to Article 251 of Law 5271. This Article also provides that if offences under Article 250 of Law 5271 are committed in regions under a state of emergency the maximum of 4 days detention for commonly committed offences can be extended to 7 days.

Article 148 of Law 5271 proscribes that a lawyer has to be present, when the testimony of a suspect is being taken (the testimony must be signed by a lawyer, otherwise it is not valid). At the end of June 2006 various changes to the Law 3713 on the Fight against Terrorism were made. Article 9 of the revised draft law (amending Article 10 of Law 3713) restricts the immediate right to legal counsel for those detained on suspicion of committing terrorism offences. Paragraph (b) of the Article specifies that, at a prosecutor's request and on the decision of a judge, a detainee's right to legal counsel from the first moment of detention may be delayed by 24 hours.

=== Statements extracted under torture ===
Article 15 of the UN Convention Against Torture And Other Cruel, Inhuman or Degrading Treatment or Punishment, ratified by Turkey in April 1988, prohibits the use as evidence of statements extracted under torture. In addition, Article 90 of the Turkish Constitution of 1982 provides that international provisions once ratified are binding on national law. In view of the prohibition on "torture evidence", Amnesty International remains dismayed by the widespread attitude of judges in the special Heavy Penal Courts: judges are consistently failing to take measures to initiate investigation into complaints of torture or to attempt to assess the admissibility of evidence allegedly obtained illegally.

Samples of court rulings on allegations that statements had been extracted under torture include:

- Verdict of the Panel of Chambers at the Military Court of Cassation of 17 February 1983: "... Influence is one thing, to disclose the truth as a result of influence is another thing. Because the first one will lead to sanction, there is no need to count the confession as invalid."
- Verdict of Chamber 3 at the Military Court of Cassation of 14 December 1982: "Even of it happens that the confession was obtained using torture or other kinds of fraudulent means were applied this kind of behaviour is a different quality in the responsibility of the men on duty so that there is no judicial objection to evaluate the confession and base the verdict on it, if it is being supported by other evidence or material incidents."
- In a verdict by Erzincan Military Court No. 2, dated 24 January 1984, the judges stated that the allegations of torture were all unfounded (pages 169 to 177). The judges concluded that none of the defendants could have been tortured, because there was no evidence in the medical reports; investigations into allegations of torture had all resulted in either dropping of charges or acquitting alleged torturers. According to the court's verdict anyone, if tortured, would sign a statement prepared by the police following a certain scenario, and there would be no contradictions in those statements.
- Verdict of Izmir State Security Court (SSC) of 29 November 1988: "The defendants appealed in their defence for their statements to the police to be taken out of the files, because they had generally been extracted under torture... In accordance with the legislation it was not possible to take their statements to the police out of the files, as these statement have not been assessed as evidence of the defendants' confessions. These statements have been quoted from time to tome, if other evidence and documents existed showing that the defendants committed the alleged crime."
- Istanbul Heavy Penal Court No. 14 (previously Istanbul SSC No. 6) in an interim decision during the hearing of a trial against six alleged members of the Revolutionary People's Liberation Party/Front (DHKP/C) on 30 July 2004 (ground number 2004/75): "The demand of some defence lawyers to remove the statements of E.K. to the police, the prosecutor and the arresting judge from the file, because they had not been obtained in a lawful manner and did not constitute legal evidence was rejected, because there is no provision in law to remove documents from court files."

See also: Fair trial concerns in Turkey 300-page report (in German) by Helmut Oberdiek for Amnesty International Germany, Pro Asyl, and Holtfort-Stiftung, February 23, 2006, (accessed January 1, 2007)

== Reports on torture in Turkey ==
There are numerous reports by international bodies and national and international NGOs on the problem of torture in Turkey.

=== The Committee for the Prevention of Torture ===
The European Committee for the Prevention of Torture (CPT) has paid regular visits to Turkey since the country signed and ratified the European Convention for the Prevention of Torture and Inhuman or Degrading Treatment or Punishment in 1988. The reports of the CPT are confidential, but most countries have agreed that these reports are made public. Turkey did so after a visit of the CPT in February/March 1999.

Visit from 9 to 21 September 1990

Taking into account also the other information gathered by the delegation in the course of its visit to Turkey the CPT has reached the conclusion that torture and other forms of severe ill-treatment are important characteristics of police custody in Turkey.

At the end of 1992 the CPT felt obliged to make a public statement on Turkey and said inter alias

In short, more than two years after the CPT's first visit, very little had been achieved as regards the strengthening of legal safeguards against torture and ill-treatment... In the light of all the information at its disposal, the CPT can only conclude that the practice of torture and other forms of severe ill-treatment of persons in police custody remains widespread in Turkey and that such methods are applied to both ordinary criminal suspects and persons held under anti-terrorism provisions.

Four years later another public statement was published.

Some progress has been made. The CPT's findings in the course of a visit to Turkey in October 1994 demonstrated that torture and other forms of severe ill-treatment were still important characteristics of police custody in that country. ...the Committee has continued to receive credible reports of torture and ill-treatment by Turkish law enforcement officials throughout 1995 and 1996.

The report on a visit between 16 and 24 July 2000 concluded:

The information gathered during the visit from various sources suggests that resort to some of the most severe methods of ill-treatment encountered in the past by CPT delegations has diminished in recent times in the Istanbul area.

As of October 2009 the latest report on torture in custody concerns a visit in 2005

The information gathered during the CPT’s December 2005 visit would indicate that the curve of ill-treatment by law enforcement officials remains on the decline. However, there are clearly no grounds for complacency, all the more so as reports continue to appear of ill-treatment by law enforcement officials in different parts of the country.

=== Other international bodies ===
The Commission for Enlargement of the European Union publishes annual reports on progress of countries that have asked for accession. The report on Turkey of 14 October 2009 stated

Overall, while the Turkish legal framework includes a comprehensive set of safeguards against torture and ill-treatment, efforts to implement it and fully apply the government's zero-tolerance policy have been limited. Allegations of torture and ill-treatment and impunity for perpetrators are still a cause for great concern.

The Bureau of Democracy, Human Rights, and Labor in the U.S. Department of State publish annual country reports. The 2008 report on Turkey was published on 25 February 2009. It stated

During the year human rights organizations documented a rise in cases of torture, beatings, and abuse by security forces... A December parliamentary Human Rights Investigation Commission report found that, between 2003 and 2008, 2 percent of the 2,140 personnel who were investigated due to accusations of torture or mistreatment were given disciplinary sentences.

The UN Special Rapporteur on torture and other cruel, inhuman or degrading treatment or punishment, Manfred Nowak published a report on various countries on 15 March 2007. Pages 119 to 129 relate to Turkey. Among the recommendations was

Prosecutors and judges should not require conclusive proof of physical torture or ill-treatment (much less final conviction of an accused perpetrator) before deciding not to rely as against the detainee on confessions or information alleged to have been obtained by such treatment.

Following the wide-scale torture incidents in 2016, The UN Special Rapporteur on torture and other cruel, inhuman or degrading treatment or punishment, Prof. Nils Melzer, visited Turkey two times. While his first visit was focused on freedom of press and expression and the second one was focused on the cases of torture under police custody and in prisons. His reports are published at OHCHR website.

Freedom from Torture, the UK charity which works with torture survivors, stated that it had received 79 referrals of individuals from Turkey, for clinical treatment and other services provided by the charity, in 2011

== See also ==
- Human rights in Turkey
