= Yön =

Turkish political magazine (1961–1967)

- Editor-in-chief: Doğan Avcıoğlu
- Categories: Political magazine
- Frequency: Weekly
- Founder: Cemal Reşit Eyüpoğlu; Doğan Avcıoğlu; Mümtaz Soysal
- Founded: 1961
- First issue: 20 December 1961
- Final issue: 30 June 1967
- Country: Turkey
- Based in: Ankara
- Language: Turkish

Yön (Turkish: Direction) was a weekly Turkish political magazine published between 1961 and 1967. It was a Kemalist and leftist magazine. In fact, Yön was more than a publication in that its contributors represented a political movement in the 1960s, Yön movement, which was a successor of the leftist-Kemalist movement in the 1930s known as Kadro movement. The latter also gathered around a publication, Kadro.

== History and profile ==
Yön started publication in Ankara on 20 December 1961. The founders included Doğan Avcıoğlu, Mümtaz Soysal and Cemal Reşit Eyüpoğlu. The owner of the magazine was Cemal Reşit Eyüpoğlu, and Avcıoğlu edited Yön. The first issue of the magazine contained a declaration of 500 Turkish intellectuals about a formal doctrine of socialism. Therefore, the establishment of the magazine was the first serious attempt to publicize socialist views in Turkish society.

Yön was an organ of Doğan Avcıoğlu's movement, namely direction-revolution movement, which is one of the most influential leftist movements between 1961 and 1971 in Turkey. In line with this function the magazine had a social democratic and Kemalist stance. For the magazine editors Turkey was a semi-feudal and semi-colonial country which was dependent on the Western countries, particularly the United States. Therefore, the magazine supported anti-feudalism and the Third-worldist approach. It attempted to establish a national front to achieve national democracy in Turkey. Yön paid attention to the collaboration between the working class and progressive state bureaucracy in this endeavour. It also emphasized the significant role of the Turkish army in a forthcoming revolution.

In 1962 Yön criticized the cabinets formed by İsmet İnönü after those led by Cemal Gürsel, the leader of the 1960 coup. The magazine claimed that the İnönü cabinets implemented some policies which were opposite of the desired steps taken by the Gürsel government. It was closed following its 77th issue date 5 June 1963 due to the allegations of its support for the failed military coup by an army officer, Talat Aydemir, on 21 May 1963. The weekly was restarted after fifteen months on 25 September 1964. The magazine permanently ceased publication in 1967, and its last issue was published on 30 June that year. In fact, it was closed down by Doğan Avcıoğlu who declared that Yön reached its target. During its lifetime the magazine produced a total of 222 issues.

The closure of the magazine, in fact, reflected a significant change in the ideology of the direction-revolution movement. After Yön ended its publishing, the leftist magazines Ant and Türk Solu which had different approaches in contrast to Yön were started.

== Contributors and content ==
Major contributors of Yön included İlhan Selçuk, İlhami Soysal, Niyazi Berkes, Sadun Aren, Şevket Süreyya Aydemir, Cahit Tanyol, İdris Küçükömer and Fethi Naci. Leading writers Attilâ İlhan and Çetin Altan also contributed to the magazine. Another significant contributor was Kemal Kurdaş who was the rector of Middle East Technical University. His articles contained bitter criticisms of capitalism and offered a model for Turkish-type socialism. Besim Üstünel, an economist, published articles in the magazine criticizing Turkey's association with the European Economic Community. Turan Güneş, a member of the Republican People's Party, was among its contributors until Yön clearly supported a dictatorial regime.

Turhan Selçuk published political cartoons in Yön which published articles on the topics that were taboo in Turkey in the 1960s. One of these topics was the Kurdish issue in Turkey for which the magazine employed the term the Eastern problem.

In addition to political writings, Yön also cultural and literary sections. The cultural section was edited by Fethi Naci and Konur Ertop. The magazine featured a poem of Nazım Hikmet (published in 1964) whose works had not been published in the country for a long time. Mihri Belli, another influential figure, joined Yön in 1964. His contributions affected the political stance of the magazine in that Yön began to become closer to the right-wing views and to support the Republican Peasants' Nation Party which had been headed by Alparslan Türkeş, one of the army officers who participated in the military coup on 27 May 1960.

== Circulation and popularity ==
Immediately after its foundation Yön sold 30,000 copies. The circulation of the magazine decreased to between 4,000 and 5,000 copies in 1965.

Yön was the most popular publication during its run among the university students and faculty members from different universities. Deniz Gezmiş, a leftist youth leader, reported that he became a socialist after reading Yön.
