= Chaos Class Museum =

Coordinates: 41°00′49″N 29°02′31.2″E

The Chaos Class Museum (Turkish: Hababam Sınıfı Müzesi) was established in 2014 in a room inside the Adile Sultan Pavilion, where the Chaos Class film series was shot.

Adile Sultan Pavilion was the location of the film series shot by director Ertem Eğilmez in 1975, 1976 and 1977, and was shown as Private Çamlıca High School (Turkish: Özel Çamlıca Lisesi) in the film. One of the rooms of the mansion was organized as the "Chaos Class Museum" (Turkish: Hababam Sınıfı Müzesi) in 2014.

In the museum room, there are school desks, blackboards, stoves and photographs of many actors from the period that was the subject of the film. There are silicone statues of the characters Güdük Necmi played by Halit Akçatepe, Hafize Ana played by Adile Naşit, Mahmut Hoca played by Münir Özkul and İnek Şaban played by Kemal Sunal in the film series Hababam Sınıfı. "6/A Edebiyat" (6/A Literature) is written on the door

In front of the blackboard, the human skeleton that İnek Şaban thought was Külyutmaz Hoca in the fourth film of the series is displayed. On the desks in the venue are photographs of writer Rıfat Ilgaz, director Ertem Eğilmez and many actors from Sıtkı Akçatepe to Tarık Akan . On the walls are Hababam Sınıfı movie posters, information about the actors and stills from the movies.

In the entrance, author İlhan Selçuk's description of the Chaos Class is written: "It is the classroom of all of us... With its teachers and students... The blackboard, the smell of chalk, the noise of the rascals, the rustle of paper, the creaking of desks, the bitter and sweet memories of school life with its written exams, oral exams, copies, report cards, attendance and make-up exams..."

A similar museum was established in 2018 by the Kepez Municipality in the Amir Ateş District Mansion in Antalya and opened to visitors.

== Gallery ==
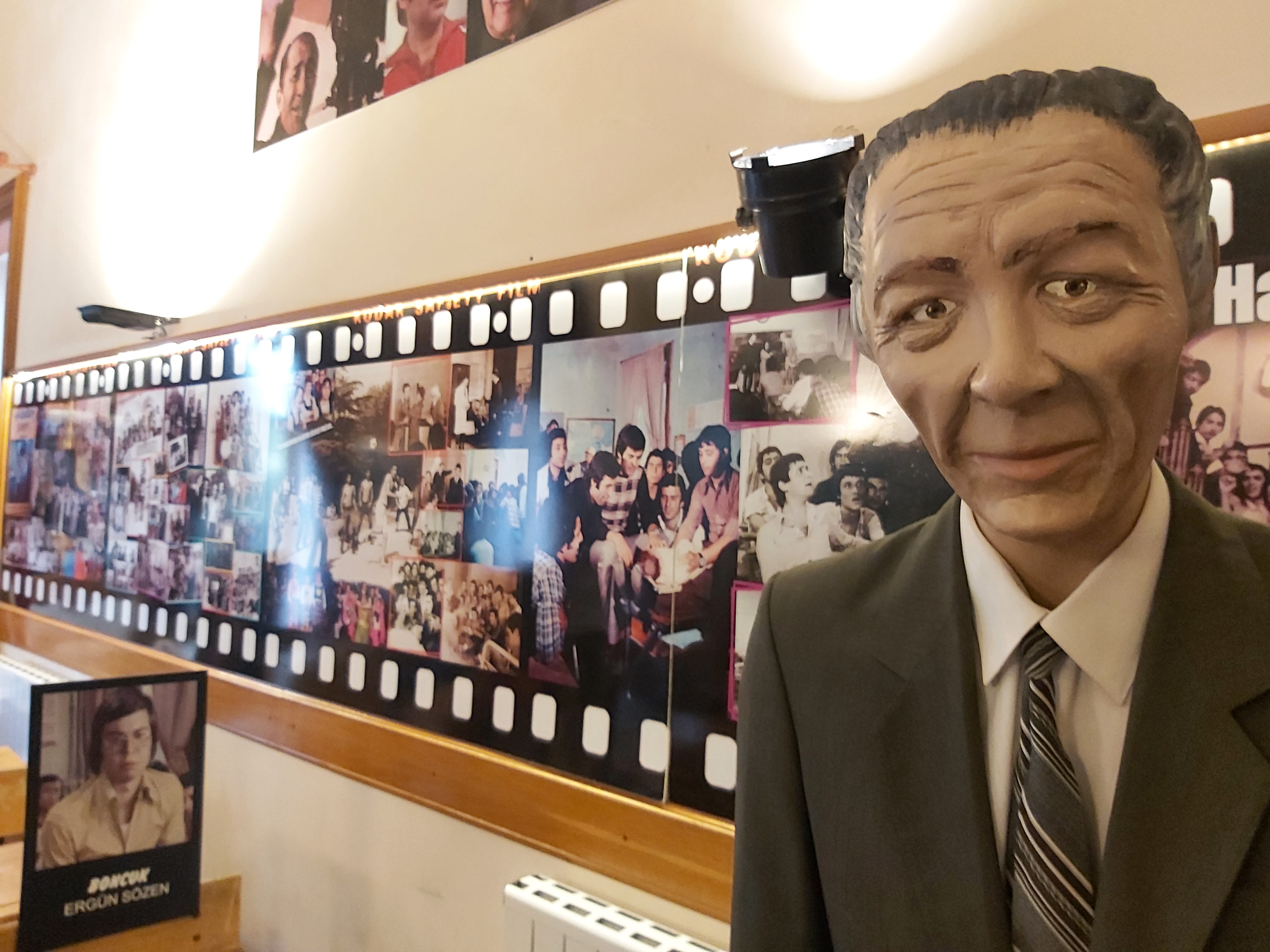

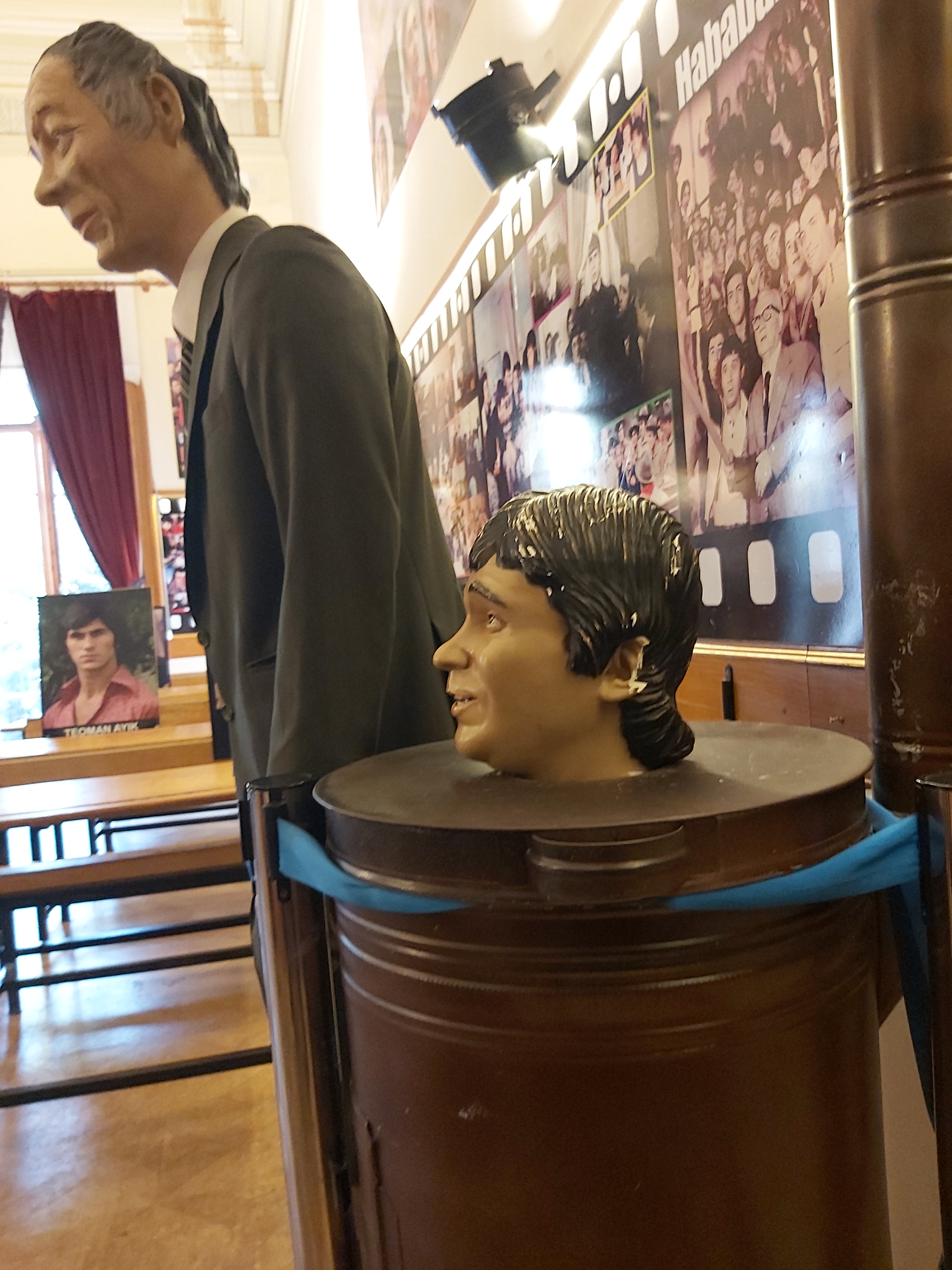

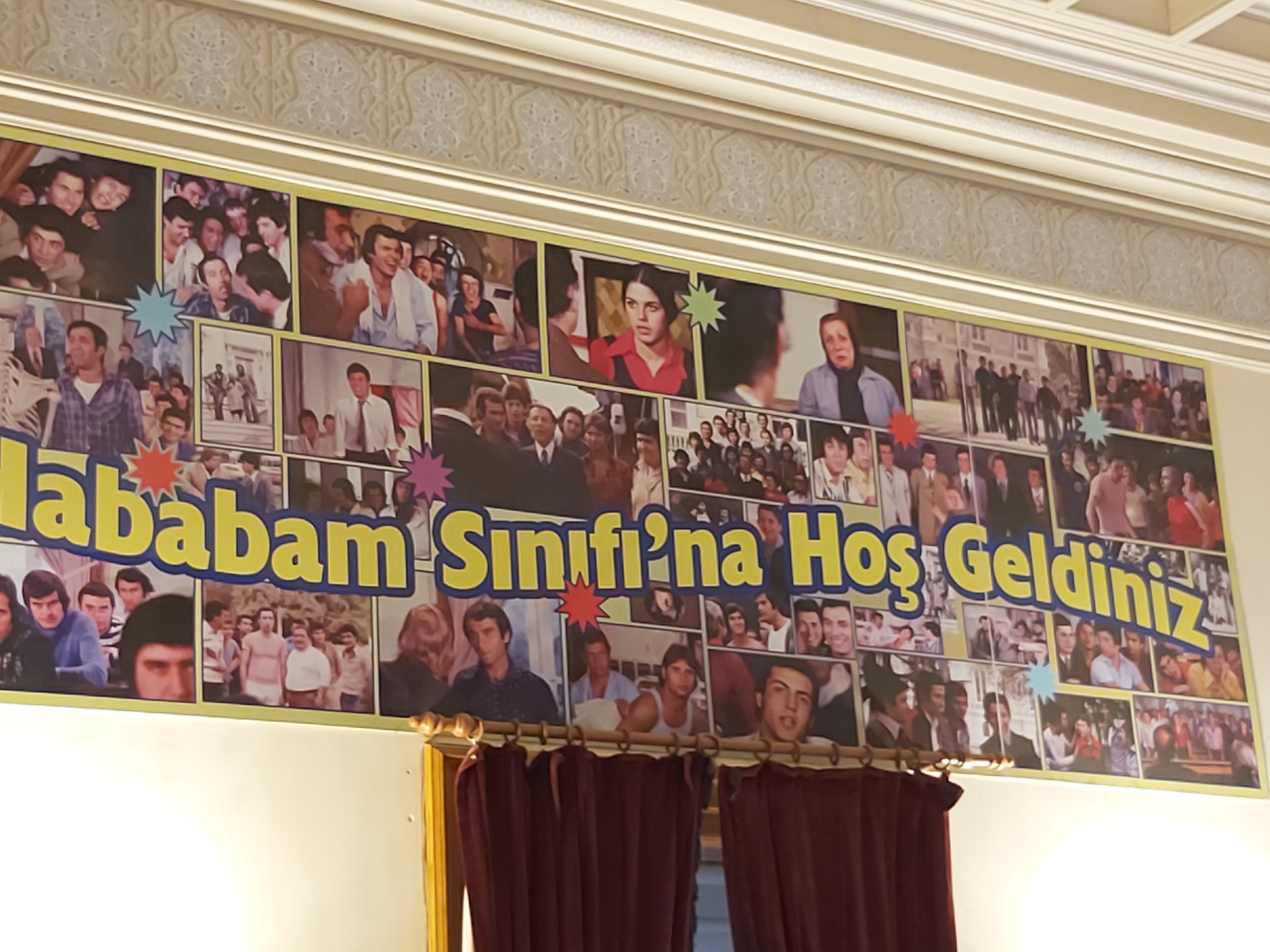

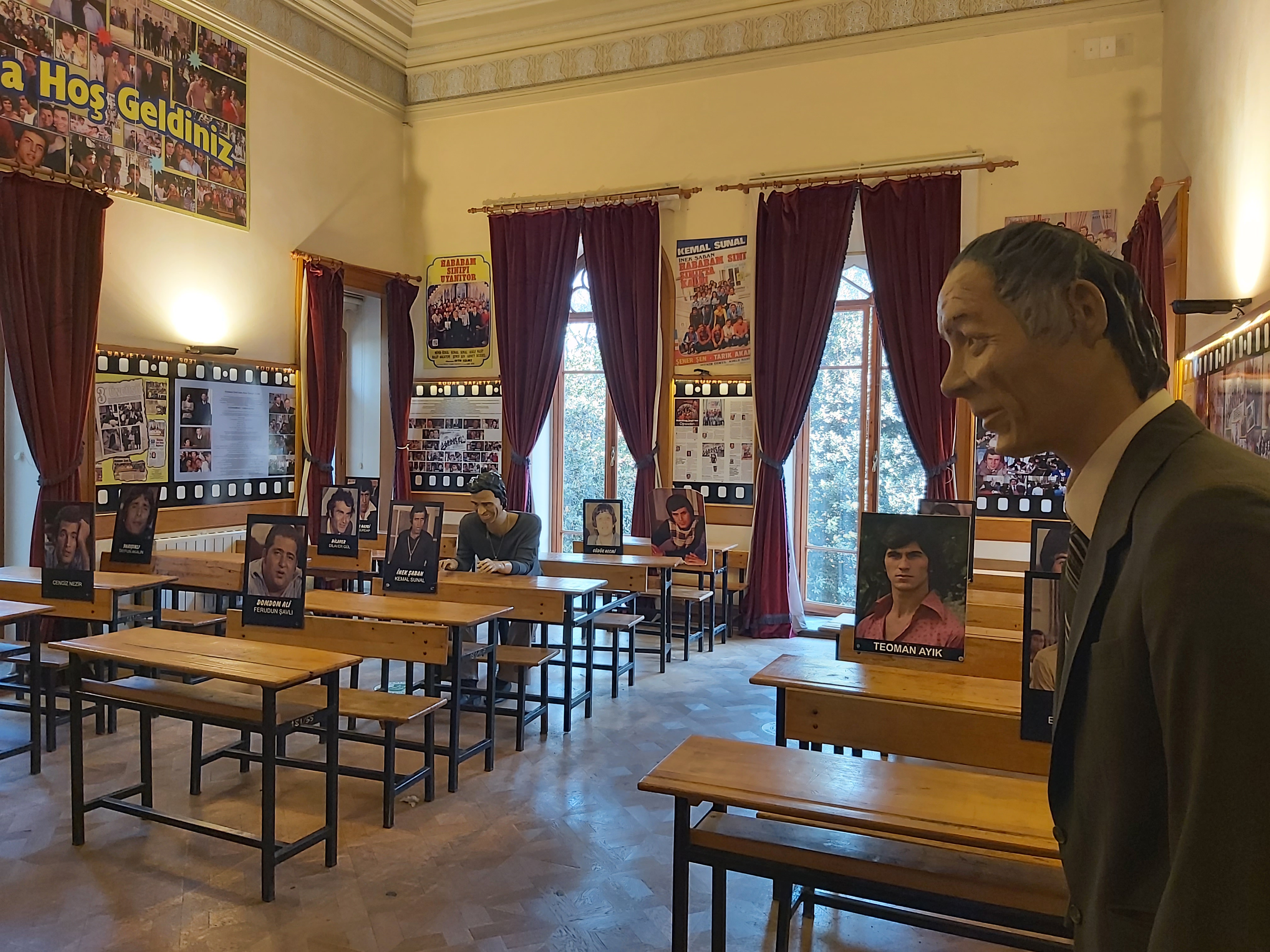
