= Erol Mütercimler =

Turkish journalist, columnist and academic

- Born: 1954 (age 71–72); Kars, Turkey
- Occupations: Turkish journalist, columnist and academic

Erol Mütercimler (born 1954 in Kars, Turkey) is a Turkish journalist, columnist and academic. He is a retired naval officer. In 2009 he was charged in the second indictment of the Ergenekon trials.

Mütercimler is "widely credited as being the first person to have written about Ergenekon", initially describing it in an interview in Aydınlık in 1997, during public discussion of the Susurluk scandal. Mütercimler said he heard of the original organization's existence from retired general Memduh Ünlütürk (who was assassinated in 1991), who was involved in the anti-communist Ziverbey interrogations following the 1971 coup. In 2012 he testified that he had initially dismissed the organization, but that Admiral Kemal Kayacan (assassinated in 1992) had told him to take it seriously, calling it "the name of the organization that plots everything".

== Books ==
- Gençler İçin Fikrimizin Rehberi (2013), Alfa Basım Yayım Dağıtım. ISBN 9786051066998
- Ertuğrul Faciası: 21.Yüzyıla Doğru Türkiye - Japonya İlişkisi (2010), Alfa Basım Yayım Dağıtım. ISBN 9786051062396
- Gelibolu 1915 (Ciltli) (2010), Alfa Basım Yayım Dağıtım. ISBN 9786051062082
- Komplo Teorileri: Aynanın Ardında Kalan Gerçekler (2010), Alfa Basım Yayım Dağıtım. ISBN 9789752976054
- Satılık Ada Kıbrıs: Kıbrıs Barış Harekatının Bilinmeyen Yönleri (2009), Alfa Basım Yayım Dağıtım. ISBN 9789752978379
- Destanlaşan Gemiler (1987)
