= Muhsin Batur =

Turkish general and statesperson (1920–1999)

- Nickname: The Flying General (Uçan General)
- Born: December 5, 1920; Üsküdar, Istanbul, Ottoman Empire
- Died: September 25, 1999 (aged 78) Istanbul, Turkey
- Buried: Zincirlikuyu Cemetery
- Allegiance: Turkey
- Branch: Turkish Air Force
- Service years: 1940-1973
- Spouse: Leman Meryem Batur (m. 1944; death 1999)
- Children: Ayşe Emel Aral (1944-); Ahmet Enis Batur (1952-)

Mehmet Muhsin Batur (5 December 1920 – 25 September 1999), known as The Flying General (Uçan General), was a Turkish military officer and politician who served as the commander of the Turkish Air Forces.

He was the candidate of the Republican People's Party in 1980 presidential election, however he did not garner enough votes to be elected in each of the 115 rounds. As a result of the deadlocked election, a junta led by Kenan Evren executed a successful coup d'etat on 12 September in the same year.

== Military career ==
Muhsin Batur graduated from the Military Academy in 1940, and the Air Force Academy in 1942. He started his career in Merzifon as a pilot in 4th Plane Regiment. He attended the Air War Academy between 1946 and 1949. After his graduation he served in various air forces and units, as well as the Allied Forces Southern Europe in Naples.

Batur was the one who had arrested Adnan Menderes in Eskişehir and transported him to Ankara, during the 1960 coup d'état. He was promoted to brigadier general rank in 1961 and had been appointed to the 1st Tactical Air Force Command, serving for five years. He was promoted to major general in 1963, and to lieutenant general in 1966. After 1966 he commanded the General Staff Logistical Command and served as a member of the Supreme Military Council.

He was promoted to general officer in 1969 and was appointed to the Air Force Command. He founded the Air Force Support Foundation on 1 June 1970 and served as the chairman. He retired from the military on 30 August 1973.

=== 1971 military memorandum ===
Batur was one of four senior military officers who signed the military memorandum in 1971. After the memorandum, he was interrogated in the Ziverbey Villa by the National Intelligence Organization, under the orders of Faik Türün. He was alleged to have joined the ranks of 9 March 1971 coup d'etat attempt using the "Yavuz Bey" codename.

== Political career ==
After his retirement from military, he was appointed to the Senate of the Republic on 8 June 1974 by President Fahri Korutürk. He joined the Republican People's Party during his senatorship and he became a candidate for presidency in 1980. Despite getting the highest number of votes in the election, he was not able to be elected as he did not achieve the required number of votes. He retired from the political career right before the 1980 coup d'etat, as his term in the Senate had ended.

He later published his memoirs in Anılar ve Görüşler-Üç Dönemin Perde Arkası book (1986).

== Personal life and legacy ==
Muhsin Batur married Leman Meryem on 4 February 1944. They had a daughter, Ayşe Emel (Aral) (born 1944) and a boy, Ahmet Enis (born 1952). He knew English and Italian. Batur was the grandson of Hüseyin Hâki Bey, who founded the Şirket-i Hayriye (one of the precursors to the Turkish Maritime Organization).

Murat Aygen played Muhsin Batur on Hatırla Sevgili series, broadcast on ATV between 2006 and 2008.

== Awards and honours ==
He was awarded with State Medal of Distinguished Service, Turkish Armed Forces Medal of Honor, Turkish Armed Forces Medal of Distinguished Service, Order of Merit of the Italian Republic, Legion of Merit, Dustur-u Evvel of the Kingdom of Afghanistan, K.C.V.O. and Turkish Aeronautical Association Golden Brevet.

== Death ==
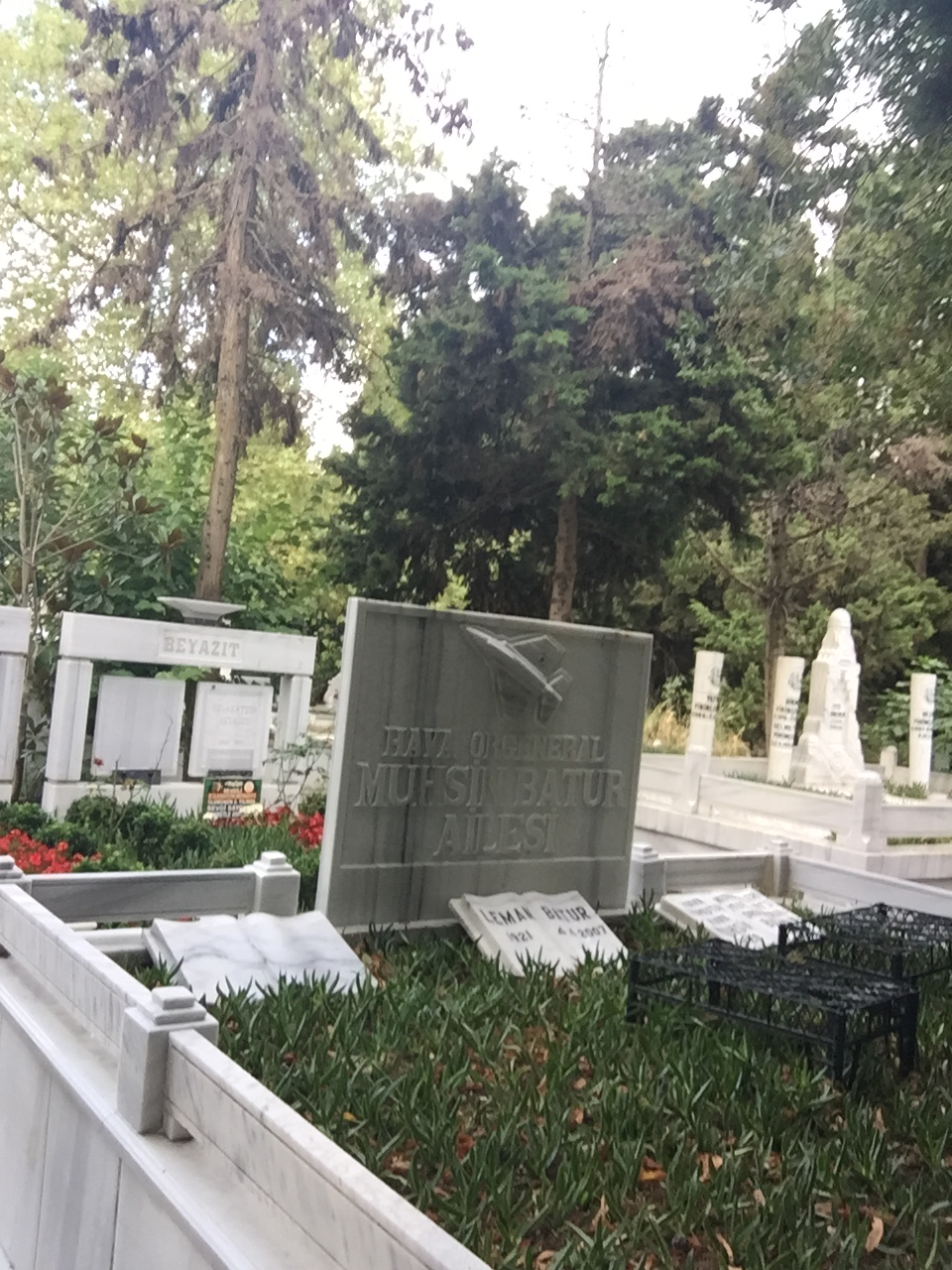
His grave in Zincirlikuyu Cemetery

Batur died in Istanbul on 25 September 1999. He was buried on Zincirlikuyu Cemetery with military honors. The funeral was attended by politicians and military personnel. Turkish President Süleyman Demirel, President of Northern Cyprus Rauf Denktaş and Chief of the General Staff Hüseyin Kıvrıkoğlu sent wreaths to the funeral.

Military offices
Preceded by Reşat Mater	Commander of the Turkish Air Force; 30 August 1969 - 25 August 1973	Succeeded by Emin Alpkaya
