= Yeniçağ =

Turkish newspaper

- Type: Daily newspaper
- Publisher: Yeniçağ Gazetecilik
- Founded: 4 March 2002
- Political alignment: Turkish nationalism
- Language: Turkish
- Headquarters: Istanbul, Turkey
- Circulation: 51,848
- Website: www.yenicaggazetesi.com.tr

Yeniçağ or Yeni Çağ ("New Era" in Turkish) is a nationalist newspaper in Turkey. It was established in 2002.

In 2008 Yeniçağ criticized the Turkish Journalists' Association for giving an award to Doğan Özgüden (co-founder of Info-Türk) and Özgüden for accepting it, describing him as "An Armenian defender" who had more than 50 lawsuits against him. On the evening of 8 December 2016, the paper's Istanbul headquarters were trashed by a mob of masked assailants carrying batons and other improvised weapons after pro-government figures criticised the paper's editorial line.
