= Mitì Vigliero Lami =

Italian journalist, writer, and poet (born 1957)

Mitì Vigliero Lami (born 1957) is an Italian journalist, writer, and poet. Born Maria Teresa Bianca Agata Anita (nickname, "Miti") in Turin, Italy, she has lived in Genoa since 1980.

Her areas of experienced include journalist of society, folklore, history of the Italian language and custom, author of numerous humorous books. She is the only woman who have won the International Festival of the Humor of Bordighera, Italy, twice. She also writes for the Italian newspapers Il Giornale, la Repubblica, Libero and magazines Cosmopolitan, Anna and Ticino 7.

== Works ==
=== Fiction ===
- In campagna non fa freddo - Le avventure di una famiglia in fuga dalla città, 2000, Mondadori, ISBN 88-04-48583-3

=== Poetry ===
- E sia follia, 1986, NEG
- Teatrino, collected poetry, 1982–92
- Ci scambiavamo sospiri, e tu avevi la luce della luna, love poems, 2002–03

=== Essays ===
- Maturità, poesie in prosa, 1992, Sansoni, ISBN 88-383-1047-5
- Ricette raccontate: Liguria - Storia della gastronomia ligure, 1998, Idea Libri, ISBN 88-7082-539-6
- L'Alice delle meraviglie - Storia, curiosità e ricette dell'acciuga, "pane del mare", 1998, Marsilio, ISBN 88-317-7059-4
- Saporitissimo Giglio - Storia, curiosità e ricette dell'aglio, Phoetidissimum Lylium, uno dei più antichi ingredienti della cucina di tutto il mondo, 2002, Marsilio, ISBN 88-317-7874-9

=== Humor ===
- Lo stupidario della Maturità - Come restare immaturi e vivere felici), 1991, Rizzoli, ISBN 88-17-84117-X
- Il sale di Adamo - Come comportarsi in modo disastroso e vivere felici), 1993, Rizzoli, ISBN 88-17-84256-7
- Il galateo delle scuse - Prontuario ad uso dei bugiardi, 1994, Mondadori, ISBN 88-04-37933-2

== Awards ==
- Dattero d'Argento, International Festival of the Humor of Bordighera, Italy, 1991, "Lo stupidario della Maturità"
- Dattero d'Oro, International Festival of the Humor of Bordighera, Italy, 1994, "Il galateo delle scuse"
