= Cemal Reşit Eyüpoğlu =

Turkish politician and journalist (1906–1988)

Personal details
- Born: 1906 Akçaabat, Trabzon, Ottoman Empire
- Died: 21 January 1988 (aged 81–82) Ankara, Turkey
- Resting place: Trabzon
- Party: Republican People's Party
- Spouse: Engin Eyüpoğlu
- Education: Istanbul University; University of Paris
- Occupation: Finance officer; Journalist; Lawyer

Cemal Reşit Eyüpoğlu (1906 – 21 January 1988) was a Turkish finance officer, lawyer, politician and journalist. He was a member of the Republican People's Party (CHP). He served at the Parliament from 1950 to 1954 and the Constituent Assembly in 1961. He was a leftist and Kemalist figure and cofounded some publications, including Yön and Devrim.

== Early life and education ==
He was born in Akçaabat, Trabzon, in 1906. He was part of a well-known family, and his father was Harun Reşit Bey, and his mother was Hatice Hanım.

He obtained a degree in law from Darülfünun, precursor of Istanbul University, in 1930. Then he received his Ph.D. from the University of Paris.

== Career and activities ==
Eyüpoğlu joined the Inspection Board on 18 March 1931 as an assistant inspector and worked at the board until 11 February 1941. Then he was appointed general director of the National Real Estate. He served as a member of the Finance Inspection Board between 1944 and 1950. He was elected as a deputy from Trabzon for the CHP in the 1950 general election and served in the 9th term of the Parliament. He was made a member of the Constituent Assembly on 6 January 1960 and served in the post until 25 Ekim 1960. After the end of his term at the Assembly he worked as a freelance lawyer.

Eyüpoğlu founded a newspaper, Vatan, in Ankara in 1961. Eyüpoğlu, Doğan Avcıoğlu and Mümtaz Soysal started the Yön magazine in December 1961. Eyüpoğlu also published articles in the magazine. He and other major figures of the period, including İdris Küçükömer, established the Socialist Culture Society (Turkish: Sosyalist Kültür Derneği) in 1963. Eyüpoğlu and Avcıoğlu also established the Devrim (Turkish: Revolution) newspaper in 1969.

== Personal life and death ==
Eyüpoğlu was married to Engin Eyüboğlu, and they had no children.

Eyüpoğlu died of kidney failure at Ibn Sina Hospital, Ankara, on 21 January 1988. He was buried in Trabzon on 24 Ocak.
