= Ant (magazine) =

Turkish political magazine (1967–1971)

- Categories: Political magazine
- Frequency: Monthly; Weekly
- Publisher: Ant Yayınları
- Founded: 1967
- First issue: 3 January 1967
- Final issue: May 1971
- Country: Turkey
- Language: Turkish
- OCLC: 30859206

Ant was a Turkish political magazine with a socialist leaning that existed between 1967 and 1971. The magazine was one of the socialist publications which appeared in the 1960s when socialist movements were on rise in Turkey like in other countries.

== History and profile ==
Ant was established by Turkish writers, Fethi Naci, Yaşar Kemal and Doğan Özgüden in 1967. The first issue of the weekly appeared on the 3 January 1967. The journal had 173 issues as a weekly until April 1970 when it was redesigned as a monthly with the name Ant - A journal of socialist theory and action and had 84, but much smaller pages. Although the magazine was viewed as supportive of the Workers' Party of Turkey (TIP), it was not an official organ of the party.

In the first issue, a socialist stance against the capitalists and landowners was announced. In later issues articles on the theories of Engels, Lenin, Ho Chi Minh or the Palestinian Nayef Hawatmeh were treated. In its first year of existence, several of its writers like Çetin Altan or Can Yücel were brought to court over terrorism related charges. The magazine frequently featured the views of leading jurists, including Hüseyin Nail Kubalı, Tarık Zafer Tunaya, İsmet Sungurbey, Bülent Nuri Esen and Münci Kapani.

As early as 1968 Ant was sensitive to the Islamist movements in Turkey. For instance, the activities of the leading Islamists, including Turgut Özal, future President, his brother, Korkut Özal, and Necmettin Erbakan, were frequently reported in the magazine based on the intelligence reports. All three were regarded as the supporters of the Muslim Brotherhood group.

In the early 1970s, Ant drifted away from TİP blaming Mehmet Ali Aybar for the loss in the parliamentary election of 1969. Then it began advocating the build-up of a new revolutionary party and gradually it argued for the urban guerrilla line. The magazine basically targeted workers, villagers and students who took part in the mass social struggle in Turkey also supporting workers strikes. As a monthly its last issue was published in May 1971 when it was closed down in the aftermath of the coup d'état. The magazine sold 20,000–25,000 copies at its height.

After the coup Ant's editors, Doğan Özgüden and Inci Tugsavul, fled to Europe, and founded the Info-Türk group.
