= Fethi Naci =

Turkish literary critic, writer, publisher, and political commentator (1927–2008)

- Fethi Naci at his desk
- Born: İsmail Naci Kalpakçıoğlu; April 3, 1927; Giresun, Trabzon Vilayet, Republic of Turkey
- Died: July 23, 2008 (aged 81); Istanbul, Istanbul Province, Republic of Turkey
- Burial place: Zincirlikuyu Cemetery, Istanbul
- Spouse: Lale Kalpakçıoğlu (1982–2008)

İsmail Naci Kalpakçıoğlu (3 April 1927 – 23 July 2008) was a Turkish literary critic, writer, publisher, and political commentator who wrote under his nom de plume Fethi Naci, derived from combining his middle name and his father, İbrahim Fethi's name. He was also known to sometimes write under the pen name Oktay Deniz. Naci was noted for Marxist theory influences, particularly from Marxist theoretician Georgi Plekhanov in his early works, of which developed in his later years into a more subjective and socially engaged approach to literary criticism. His works have often been accredited with "significant contributions to the development" of modern literary criticism in Turkey.

== Early life and education ==
Fethi Naci was born in the city of Giresun in Northern Turkey on April 3, 1927. Naci completed his primary and secondary education in Giresun, graduating from Giresun Gazi Paşa Primary School in 1939 and Erzurum High School (Erzurum Lisesi) in 1945. After high school, Naci earned his degree after graduating in 1949 from Istanbul University, Faculty of Economics. During his university years, he was supported by a government scholarship of which required him to work after class at a Sümerbank textile mill in Konya to repay the loan. Naci was briefly arrested in 1951 and jailed for about six weeks due to his involvement with student and youth organizations, though he was ultimately not convicted.

== Career ==
After graduating from university, Naci spent the 1950s and early 1960s as an accountant and business manager at various private firms, finally resigning from industry in 1965. In 1965 Naci founded Gerçek Yayınevi (Gerçek Publishing House), and thereafter devoted himself full-time to writing and publishing. Naci wrote his first literary criticism piece in 1946 (a review of a Behçet Necatigil poetry book). Earlier in Naci's career, Naci was also noted to have written fiction, particularly novels, that aided him in garnering attention. In addition to literature, he was also active in politics. Naci joined the Turkish Workers’ Party (TİP) in 1962 and contributed political essays and commentary to newspapers and journals such as Vatan and Sosyal Adalet, later writing for Yön and Ant after leaving the party. Throughout his career Naci was a prolific contributor of essays and reviews to many Turkish periodicals across the political spectrum

== Influence ==
Fethi Naci is often regarded as a major figure within Turkish literary criticism. Initially, Naci was inspired by Georgi Plekhanov, however Naci later developed a more personal and subjective approach. Naci was said to have shifted his views to "speak directly as a person to the audience", evaluating texts through his own personal views rather than hiding behind Marxist ideological dogma. He was known for often unapologetically and openly expressing his views, even when critiquing writers who held his former political beliefs. Contemporary viewers often cite Naci as an exemplar of dedication to criticism, noting that Naci left the more lucrative path of novel-writing at his career peak to devote himself to literary reviews.

== Reception and awards ==
Naci received multitudes of awards and was widely recognized in his lifetime. In 1959 he was chosen "Most Appreciated Critic of the Year" in a readers’ poll by the literary magazine Dost. Additionally in 1991, he was honored with the Sedat Simavi Foundation Literary Award (shared with Cevdet Kudret) for his book Bir Hikâyeci: Sait Faik – Bir Romancı: Yaşar Kemal. In 1998, he was named an "Onur Yazarı" (Guest of Honor) at the TÜYAP Istanbul Book Fair, a high-profile recognition in Turkey's literary community. Naci's writing was known to be critically acclaimed, with critics stating that Naci had "given his most important works in the field of criticism". His writing style was also noted to draw in readers from diverse backgrounds and made criticism accessible due to its "conversational" nature. Overall, Naci's reception has remained very positive. He is routinely cited in studies of Turkish literature and criticism, and has been described as "one of the most prominent critics of Turkish literature" in academic literature.

== Publications ==
| Year | Publication Name |
|---|---|
| 1956 | İnsan Tükenmez |
| 1959 | Gerçek Saygısı |
| 1965 | Az Gelişmiş Ülkeler ve Sosyalizm; Emperyalizm Nedir? |
| 1966 | Az Gelişmiş Ülkelerde Askeri Darbeler ve Demokrasi; Japon Kalkınması ve Türkiye |
| 1967 | Kompradorsuz Türkiye |
| 1968 | 100 Soruda Atatürk’ün Temel Görüşleri |
| 1971 | On Türk Romanı |
| 1976 | Edebiyat Yazıları |
| 1981 | 100 Soruda Türkiye’de Roman ve Toplumsal Değişme |
| 1986 | Eleştiri Günlüğü |
| 1990 | Bir Hikâyeci: Sait Faik – Bir Romancı: Yaşar Kemal; Gücünü Yitiren Edebiyat |
| 1992 | Roman ve Yaşam: Eleştiri Günlüğü III (1991–1992) |
| 1994 | Eleştiride Kırk Yıl; 40 Yılda 40 Roman |
| 1995 | Reşat Nuri’nin Romancılığı |
| 1997 | 50 Türk Romanı; Şiir Yazıları |
| 1998 | 60 Türk Romanı; Kıskanmak |
| 1999 | Yüzyılın 100 Türk Romanı; Dönüp Baktığımda... |
| 2002 | Dünya Bir Gölgeliktir |

== Death ==
Fethi Naci died at his home in Istanbul on July 23, 2008, he was 81. His funeral was held 2 days later and he is buried in Istanbul's Zincirlikuyu Cemetery.
