= Enis Batur =

Turkish poet, essayist, novelist, and editor (born 1952)

Ahmet Enis Batur
- Born: 28 June 1952 (age 74); Eskişehir, Turkey
- Education: Middle East Technical University; University of Paris
- Relatives: Muhsin Batur (father)

Ahmet Enis Batur (born 28 June 1952, Eskişehir, Turkey) is a Turkish poet, essayist, novelist, and editor.

== Life and education ==
He was born on June 28, 1952. His grandfather was Hüseyin Hâki Bey, the founder of Şirket-i Hayriye. His father was former Turkish Air Force Commander Muhsin Batur. He spent his childhood in Eskişehir and Naples, and his early youth in Istanbul and Ankara. He completed his primary school education at Dumlupınar Primary School, and his middle and high school education at Saint-Joseph High School in Istanbul and Ankara High School. His first article was published in 1970, and his first books in 1973. During his student years, he managed the cinema page of Ulus newspaper. He began his higher education at Middle East Technical University and completed it in Paris in 1976.

After returning to his country, he published the magazines Yazı, Oluşum, Meb, and Tan. In 1982, he published Çağdaş Kent magazine, which was banned by martial law after its first issue. He prepared the Encyclopedia of European Countries in 1983 and Islamic Countries in 1984. He led the team that developed Şehir magazine between 1987 and 1988. He completed his military service in Çankırı and settled in Istanbul in 1983.

He served as head of the Publications Department at the Ministry of National Education (1979–1980), director of Milliyet's cultural service and subsidiary publications (1983–1984), editor-in-chief of Milliyet's Great Encyclopedia (1986) and of Dönemli Yayıncılık (1987–1988), and from 1988 to 2004, he directed Yapı Kredi Publications. He played a key role in the translation of many classics and important foreign works into Turkish, further expanding Yapı Kredi Publications.

== Career ==
Enis Batur is one of the leading figures in contemporary Turkish literature with a large body of work, extending to over a hundred volumes. Some of his works have been translated into European languages including French, English and Italian. He was among the contributors of the literary magazine Papirüs which was edited by Cemal Süreya.

He was a chief-editor at the Yapı Kredi Yayınları since 2017.

== Bibliography ==
- Eros ve Hgades (1973, Shakespeare & Co.)
- Bir Ortaçağ Yalnızlığı (1973, ABC)
- Nil (1975, Yapıt; 1998, 4. edition, Altıkırkbeş)
- Ara Kitab (1976, Self-Published)
- Ayna (1977, Ada)
- İblise Göre İncil (1979, Yeni Ankara; 2001, 4. Edition, Altıkırkbeş)
- Şiir ve İdeoloji (1979, Derinlik)
- Kandil (1981, Ada; 2001, 4. Edition, Altıkırkbeş)
- Tahta Troya (1981, Yazko)
- Tuğralar (1985, Tan; 1993, expanded 3. edition, Remzi)
- Sarnıç (1985, Nisan; 1996, 4. edition, Altıkırkbeş)
- Alternatif: Aydın (1985, Hil)
- Babil Yazıları (1986, AFA)
- Otuz Kuş Birden Olmak (1986, BFS)
- Viyana İçin Siyah Vals (1987, BFS)
- Estetik Ütopya (1987, BFS)
- Yazılar ve Tuğralar (1987, BFS)
- Kara Mizah Antolojisi (1987, Hil)
- İki/z (1988, BFS)
- Bu Kalem Bukalemun (1988, Hil; 1997, 2001, YKY)
- Eşittir Sonsuz (1988, BFS)
- Kediler Krallara Bakabilir (1990, Remzi; 1996, İyi Şeyler; 2002, Sel)
- Koma Provaları (1990, 1998, Altıkırkbeş)
- Söz'lük (1990, Düzlem)
- Gönderen: Enis Batur(1991, Remzi; 2000, Sel)
- Hatay'da Bir Rolls-Royce (1991, Altıkırkbeş)
- Perişey (1992, 1993, Remzi; 1998, 3. basım, Altıkırkbeş)
- Küçük Kıpırtı Tarihi (1992, Boyut)
- Kırkpâre (1992, Remzi; 2001, Sel)
- Şiir ve İdeoloji (1992, Mitos)
- Yazının Ucu (1993, 1994, YKY)
- Gesualdo (1993, 1994, YKY)
- Akabe (1994, Mitos)
- Ağlayan Kadınlar Lahdi (1994, Harf)
- Kandil, Yazı Şiirler 1973 - 1985 (1994, Altıkırkbeş)
- Ondört + X + 4 (1994, © Yayın)
- Taşrada Ölüm Dirim Hazırlıkları (1995, Oğlak)
- Günebakan I: Alternatif: Aydın (1995, Ark)
- Günebakan II: Saatsız Maarif Takvimi (1995, Ark)
- Darb ve Mesel (1995, 1995, Altıkırkbeş)
- E/Babil Yazıları (1995, 2003 YKY)
- Modernlerin Gecesi (1995, Altıkırkbeş)
- Opera 1-4004 (1996, Altıkırkbeş)
- Kesif - Saint-Nazaire Günlüğü (1996, Mitos)
- Yolcu (1996, İyi Şeyler)
- Ya/zar (1996, © Yayınları)
- İki Deniz Arası Siyah Topraklar (1997, YKY)
- Bu Kalem Melûn © (1997, 2001, YKY)
- Seyrüsefer Defteri (1997, YKY)
- Frenhoferolmak (1997, Sel)
- Doğu-Batı Dîvanı (1997, 1998, 2002, YKY)
- Aciz çağ, faltaşları (1998, 2003 YKY)
- Türkiye'nin Üçlemi (1998, Papirüs)
- Sütte Ne Çok Kan (1998, Altıkırkbeş)
- Issız Dönme Dolap (1998, YKY)
- Su, Tüyün Üzerinde Bekler (1999, Sel)
- Kurşunkalem Portreler (1999, 2000, Sel)
- Amerika Büyük Bir Şaka (1999, 2000, YKY)
- Kanat Hareketleri (2000, 2000, Altıkırkbeş)
- Cüz (2000, Sel)
- Başkalaşımlar I - X (1992, 2000, YKY)
- Başkalaşımlar XI - XX (2000, YKY)
- Acı Bilgi, Fugue Sanatı Üzerine Bir Roman Denemesi (2000, 2000, 2002 YKY)
- Smokinli Berduş, Şiir Yazıları 1974 - 2000 (2001, YKY)
- Yazboz (2001, Sel)
- Kum Saatından Harfler (2001, YKY)
- Elma, Örgü Teknikleri Üzerine Bir Roman Denemesi (2001, 2002, Sel)
- İçinizde Kaç Koridor Var? (2001, YKY)
- Son Kare (2002, Altıkırkbeş)
- Şehren'is (2002, Literatür Yayınları)
- Papirüs, Mürekkep, Tüy: Seçme Şiirler 1973-2002 (June 2002, YKY)
- Başka Yollar (September 2002, YKY)
- Bir Varmış, Bir Okmuş (November 2002, Sel)
- Abdal Düşü: Düzyazı Şiirler 1998-2002 (March 2003, Altıkırkbeş)
- Ağırlaştırıcı Sebepler Divanı (December 2003, Altıkırkbeş)
- Bekçi (March 2003, Oğlak)
- Kravat (April 2003, Sel)
- Bu Kalem Un Ufak (2004, Okuyanus)
- Kütüphane (2005, Sel)
- Gövde'm (2007, Sel)
- Sır:bir oynaşı (2009, İstanbul:Sel Yayıncılık)
- Basit Bir Es* (2015, İstanbul: Kırmızı Kedi)
