= Turhan Selçuk =

Turkish cartoonist

- Born: July 30, 1922; Milas, Muğla, Turkey
- Died: March 11, 2010 (aged 87); Istanbul, Turkey
- Occupation: Cartoonist

Turhan Selçuk (30 July 1922 – March 11, 2010) was a Turkish cartoonist.

== Biography ==
Born in Muğla, Milas Selçuk was a prolific caricature cartoonist and illustrator. He is considered to be one of the few cartoonists in Turkey, who paved the way for the current Turkish cartoon scene.

Selçuk was the founder of the Turkish Cartoonists Association together with Semih Balcıoğlu and Ferit Öngören. İlhan Selçuk was his brother. He died in Istanbul.

== Awards and honors ==
- First Prize for caricature in the Journalism Achievement Award Competition organised by the Association of Journalism in Turkey (1955)
- Golden Palm at the International Festival of the Humor of Bordighera (Salone Internazionale dell'Umorismo di Bordighera) (1956)
- Aero Club Silver Cup International Festival of the Humor of Bordighera (Salone Internazionale dell'Umorismo di Bordighera) (1956)
- Silver Date at the International Festival of the Humor of Bordighera (Salone Internazionale dell'Umorismo di Bordighera) (1962)
- Ippocampo Award at the Ippocampo-Vasto Caricature Festival in Italy (1970)
- Artist of the People Award by the Union of Turkish Artists (1971)
- Silver Cup at the Verelli Caricature Biennial in Italy (1975)
- Achievement Award by the Association of Journalists in Turkey (1983)
- Achievement Award for Journalism by the Association of Journalists in Turkey (1987)
- Achievement Award for Journalism by the Association of Journalists in Turkey (1988)
- Achievement Award for Journalism by the Association of Journalists in Turkey (1989)
- Achievement Award for Journalism by the Association of Journalists in Turkey (1990)
- Best Caricaturists opinion poll to choose “The Best in the Last Twenty Years” among Boğaziçi University students as part of their twentieth anniversary celebrations (1992)
- Honorary doctorate ( Doctor Honoris Causa ) by Cumhuriyet University in Sivas, Turkey (1992)
- Honorary doctorate ( Doctor Honoris Causa ) by Anadolu University (1997)
- Presidential Grand Awards in Art and Culture, Turkey (1997)

== Bibliography ==
- Turhan Selçuk Karikatür Albümü (1954) (Turhan Selçuk Cartoon Album)
- 140 Karikatür (1959) (140 Cartoons)
- Turhan 62 (1962)
- Hiyeroglif (1964) (Hieroglyph)
- Hal ve Gidis Sifir (1969) (A Zero for the Current Situation)
- Söz Çizginin (1979) (Line's Say)
- Insan Haklari (1995) (Human Rights)

== Characters ==
- Abdülcanbaz
- Karanfil Hoca
- Tarzan
- Fettah
- Fayrabi
- Gözlüklü Sami Bey
- Sürmegöz Ihsan Bey

== See also ==
- İlhan Selçuk
- Abdülcanbaz
- Turkish Cartoonists Association
- Saul Steinberg
