= Doğan Özgüden =

Turkish journalist and publisher (born 1936)

Doğan Özgüden (born 1936 in Kalecik, Ankara) is a Turkish journalist and publisher. A former editor of Akşam (1964–1966), he has been based in Belgium since 1974, having left Turkey after the 1971 military coup under threat of over 300 years in prison for his publications. With Info-Türk co-founder Inci Tugsavul he was awarded the 2006 Ayse Zarakolu Freedom of Thought Prize by the Human Rights Association of Turkey for Info-Türk's journalism.

== Career ==
Özgüden worked at a variety of Turkish newspapers from 1952 to 1964, before becoming editor-in-chief of Turkish daily newspaper Akşam (1964–1966). A member of the Workers Party of Turkey (TIP), he was elected to the party's central committee in 1964.

Together with Inci Tugsavul, Özgüden co-founded the Ant Publishing House in 1967, publishing the weekly Ant as well as a variety of books. After the banning of Ant by the junta of the 1971 military coup, its editors Özgüden and Tugsavul organized in Europe, founding Info-Türk in Brussels in 1974. The founders were charged with over 50 opinion-related crimes for articles written or published in Ant, and were stripped of their Turkish nationality in 1984.

In 2006 the Human Rights Association of Turkey awarded the 2006 Ayse Zarakolu Freedom of Thought Prize to Info-Türk co-founders Özgüden and Tugsavul. On the occasion of the award, IFEX said that Info-Türk had "tackled many subjects considered taboo in Turkey, including anti-Semitism and the question of the Armenian Genocide."

== Bibliography ==
- https://www.rtbf.be/article/un-journaliste-d-origine-turque-sous-protection-apres-des-menaces-5216553
- https://www.lalibre.be/international/2008/12/13/dogan-ozguden-sous-protection-RKLHD264TZDT7H43STFQSFXZSU/
- https://medialatitudes.be/belgique-un-demi-siecle-dexil-dun-couple-de-journalistes-turcs/

== Filmography ==
- Esra Yıldız, Stateless - Heitatlos, 2023.
