= Devrim (newspaper) =

Weekly newspaper in Turkey (1969–1971)

Devrim (Turkish: Revolution) was a weekly newspaper published in Ankara which was launched on 21 October 1969. The owner was Cemal Reşit Eyüpoğlu, and the director of publication was Doğan Avcıoğlu, who also wrote the editorials.

The newspaper sought to show that the contemporary understanding of democracy was simply a diversion. Instead, they proposed a 'national – revolutionary' administration in the direction of extra-parliamentary opposition. Hasan Cemal, one of the writers of the paper in his memoirs, Cumhuriyet'i Çok Sevmiştim, confessed that the purpose of such a policy was to convince nationalist officers in the military to stage a coup in the cause of 'National Democratic Revolution'.

Devrim ceased publication on 27 April 1971 following the 1971 Turkish coup d'état.
