= Faik Türün =

Turkish general

Commander of the First Army of Turkey
- In office 29 September 1970 – 14 August 1973
- Preceded by: Kemal Atalay
- Succeeded by: Hüseyin Doğan Özgöçmen

Personal details
- Born: 17 October 1913 Bursa, Ottoman Empire
- Died: 15 February 2003 (aged 89) Istanbul, Turkey
- Party: Justice Party
- Spouse: Ayşe Bedia Türün
- Children: 5
- Education: Turkish Military Academy
- Awards: Silver Star

Military service
- Allegiance: Turkey
- Branch/service: Turkish Land Forces
- Years of service: 1933–1975
- Rank: General
- Commands: 8th Corps; 3rd Corps; Third Army; First Army
- Battles/wars: Korean War

Faik Türün (17 October 1913 – 15 February 2003) was a Turkish general. He served in the Korean War as the Chief of Operations for the Turkish Brigade and was awarded the Silver Star by General Douglas MacArthur.

He was the Commander of the First Army of Turkey during the 1971 Turkish coup d'état. He was one of the leading persons associated with the Counter-Guerrilla in the 1970s, and allegedly blocked a coup plot of young "socialist" officers in that capacity, which was planned to take place on March 9, 1971 under the tutelage of the then Turkish Air Force commander General Muhsin Batur. He led the Operation Sledgehammer (associated with the Ziverbey Villa) against these officers and the associated journalists and writers, who were supposed to have been plotting a coup to establish a new government with strong socialist tendencies. During this operation, it is claimed by several journalists and politicians that Faik Türün was behind the tortures of political opponents in Ziverbey Villa . After retirement from the Army, he was elected to Turkish Parliament as a deputy for the conservative and right-wing Justice Party from 1977, representing Manisa.
