= Info-Türk =

Belgian-based Turkish foundation

Info-Türk is a Turco-European working group and foundation that was founded in 1974 in Brussels with the aim to inform world opinion of the social, economic, cultural and political life of Turkey, and to address issues relating to emigration from Turkey. As well as its monthly Info-Türk bulletin, Info-Türk has published many books, pamphlets, files, records and cassettes in different languages, mainly in English, French, Dutch, German and Turkish.

In 2006, on the occasion of Info-Türk's founders being awarded the Human Rights Association of Turkey's Ayse Zarakolu Freedom of Thought Prize, IFEX said that Info-Türk had "tackled many subjects considered taboo in Turkey, including anti-semitism and the question of the Armenian Genocide."

== Background ==
Historically, it is the continuation of two preceding initiatives in Turkey led by its founders Doğan Özgüden and Inci Tugsavul. Ant Publications (Ant Yayınları) published in Istanbul a socialist review (Ant) and more than fifty books from 1967 to 1971. After Ant was banned by the junta of the 1971 military coup, its editors organized in Europe. The founders were charged with over 50 opinion-related crimes for articles published in Ant, and were stripped of their Turkish nationality in 1984.

== Overview ==
Info-Türk launched its activities in April 1974 with the publication of a series of books and pamphlets.

The publication of the monthly periodical Info-Türk started in November 1976. The Bulletin Info-Türk was published until January 1998 only on paper. From February 1998 until October 2001, also in electronic edition. Since November 2001, Info-Türk has been published only in the electronic edition. The information given by Info-Türk for more than 30 years constitutes a real chronology on the repression and the struggles for democracy in Turkey for more than a quarter of a century.

In addition to its publications and information activities, Info-Türk has also organized a series of social and cultural activities for immigrants in Belgium, such as language courses, social and professional training, creative workshops and homework classes, and takes part in many democratic initiatives in the struggle against racism and xenophobia.

All these activities and services are grouped within an independent intercultural organization called Sun Workshops.

== Foundation ==
In 2003, the working group Info-Türk transformed into a private foundation. This foundation has the aim of preserving and developing the material and intellectual heritage that its founders created in order to contribute to the recognition of socio-political and cultural realities of Turkey and to the socio-cultural promotion of immigrants and refugees coming from Turkey to Europe.

The foundation's principal activities:

- Classification and computerization of the written, printed, or audio-visual documents, realized or acquired by its founders;
- Diffusion of current information relating to the defense of human rights and to the democratization of the social, cultural, and political life in Turkey;
- Organization of activities or competitions which can contribute to the realization of the foundation's aims.

In 2006 the Human Rights Association of Turkey awarded the 2006 Ayse Zarakolu Freedom of Thought Prize to Info-Türk co-founders Dogan Özgüden and Inci Tugsavul.
