= Ziverbey Villa =

Building in Turkey

The Ziverbey Villa (Turkish: Ziverbey Köşkü) was a villa in Erenköy, Istanbul which was used as an interrogation center after the 1971 coup d'état. It was used by the Special Warfare Department and others associated with the Counter-Guerrilla. Those detained were mostly associated with the left; the 12 March 1971 coup was alleged to be a counter-coup against a planned 9 March communist coup.

== History ==
=== 1971 military memorandum ===
The mastermind behind Ziverbey interrogations was brigadier general Memduh Ünlütürk, working under lieutenant General Turgut Sunalp, who was reporting to the Commander of First Army, General Faik Türün. The latter two generals were Korean War veterans who had served in the Operations Department (Turkish: Harekât Dairesi). The interrogation techniques they used in Ziverbey were inspired by what they had seen done to Korean and Chinese POWs during the Korean War. Prisoners were bound and blinded.

Our interrogation technique was "special". Our men were special... An incorrigible communist alleged that she was raped with a truncheon. Pardon my saying so, but would our 20-21 year old stout boys need a truncheon? It defies all logic. As far as I know, the prisoners were merely slapped around.

— Turgut Sunalp, Nokta, 3 November 1985 (the slapping references Eyüp Ozalkus's treatment of Talat Turhan)

Intellectuals such as İlhan Selçuk (allegedly linked with the 9 March coup plans) and Uğur Mumcu were tortured there. Several Ziverbey victims confirmed that the interrogators introduced themselves as "Counter-Guerrillas", above the law, and entitled to kill. Under duress to write an apologetic statement, Selçuk famously revealed his plight using a modified acrostic which decrypted to "I am under torture". The key letter was the first of the penultimate word of each sentence in his statement.

Another prisoner, outspoken liberal Murat Belge, says that he was tortured there by Veli Küçük, who later founded JITEM and Hezbollah (Turkey) to counter the Kurdistan Workers' Party. Küçük says he could not be responsible since he was stationed in Şırnak and has been charged with colluding with another Ziverbey victim, İlhan Selçuk (see Ergenekon).

The activist film director Yılmaz Güney was also present. A friend of his in the MİT had tried to prevent him from being captured by telling his superiors that Güney was also a spy, but the ruse failed. A MİT officer who was present, Mehmet Eymür, said Güney was treated well in return for his co-operation.

General Yamak denied that the Special Warfare Department (ÖHD) was involved, and dismissed any notion of a "counter-guerrilla".

Ziverbey is notable for:

- being the first time the term "Counter-Guerrilla" was mentioned to anyone who was not already a member.
- revealing the fact that the counter-guerrilla co-operated with the MİT.

=== Demolition ===
Ziverbey Villa was demolished in the 1990s.

== Monument to the Victims of Torture ==
In 2013, a monument titled "Monument to the Victims of Torture" was erected in front of the Ziverbey Villa.

== Books ==
- Ziverbey Köşkü, İlhan Selçuk, Çağdaş Yayınları, 1997
