= CIA activities in Turkey =

Throughout the Cold War, the U.S. conducted operations focused on combatting socialism in Turkey, executed chiefly through Operation Gladio's Turkish branch, the Counter-Guerrilla. The Syrian civil war has seen a resurgence of CIA activity in Turkey in recent years.

== U2 reconnaissance flights ==
Starting in the 1950s, Lockheed U-2 reconnaissance flights flew from Incirlik Air Base in Turkey. The U-2 flown by Francis Gary Powers and shot down over the Soviet Union in May 1960 was based at Incirlik - as was Power's unit, which operated under the cover of the Weather Observational Squadron of the National Advisory Committee for Aeronautics. The unit consisted of pilots recruited by the CIA to fly high-altitude reconnaissance missions over the Soviet Union and other key sites. During the Suez Crisis they also flew reconnaissance flights over the Mediterranean.

== Recruitment ==
During the Cold War, an important asset was the Counter-Guerrilla, and the Grey Wolves; the paramilitary youth branch of the Nationalist Movement Party. Before the death of Counter-Guerrilla Alparslan Türkeş, the far-right paramilitary Grey Wolves were used to attack leftists.

The CIA also maintains a cadre of moles inside Turkey's National Intelligence Organization, as acknowledged in 1977 by its former deputy director—and CIA recruit—Sabahattin Savasman.

During the Cold War, the CIA set up a clandestine "stay behind" army network in Turkey. They were intended to conduct sabotage and espionage operations if required. Such networks were set up in many NATO European countries (the best known being Gladio), as well as in officially neutral countries in Europe; the network in Turkey was codenamed "Counter-Guerilla", elements of it were later accused of committing torture. The Counter-Guerrillas' existence in Turkey was revealed in 1973 by then-prime minister Bülent Ecevit.

== CIA "extraordinary rendition" flights ==
After accusations of Turkish involvement in secret CIA rendition flights were denied by Turkey's Foreign Ministry, a US diplomatic cable released by WikiLeaks revealed that such flights had taken place. A cable dated 8 June 2006 stated that the Turkish military had allowed the use of Incirlik Air Base as a refueling stop for "detainee movement operations" since 2002.

== Syria ==
According to intelligence sources quoted by Seymour Hersh, in early 2012 the CIA set up in co-operation with Turkey what it called "the Rat Line", a covert operation to obtain and transport, using proxies and front companies, armaments from Libya to rebel groups in Syria via southern Turkey. The CIA's part in the operation reportedly ended as a result of the mass evacuation of CIA operatives from the American consulate in Benghazi, Libya, after the 2012 Benghazi attack. According to Hersh, the operation was run by David Petraeus, and the CIA could avoid reporting the operation's existence to US Congress intelligence committees since the involvement of Turkey allowed it to be classed as a liaison mission.

In January 2014, the United States House Permanent Select Committee on Intelligence cast doubt on this alleged United States involvement and reported that "All CIA activities in Benghazi were legal and authorized. On-the-record testimony establishes that CIA was not sending weapons (including MANPADS) from Libya to Syria, or facilitating other organizations or states that were transferring weapons from Libya to Syria."

== See also ==
- Turkey–United States relations
