= Memduh Ünlütürk =

Turkish general

Personal details
- Born: 1913
- Died: 7 April 1991 (aged 77–78)

Military service
- Allegiance: Turkey
- Branch/service: Turkish Army
- Rank: General

Memduh Ünlütürk (1913 - 7 April 1991) was a Turkish general associated with the Counter-Guerrilla and the anti-communist Ziverbey interrogations following the 1971 coup. He was assassinated at his Istanbul home by members of the left-wing revolutionary group Dev Sol. It has been suggested that he was assassinated to protect the secrets of the Turkish deep state; Dev-Sol (DHKP/C) has been accused of links to the Ergenekon organization.

The first person to publicly talk about the Ergenekon organization was retired naval officer Erol Mütercimler, who spoke of such an organization in 1997. Mütercimler said he heard of the original organization's existence from retired general Memduh Ünlütürk. Major general Ünlütürk told Mütercimler that Ergenekon was founded with the support of the CIA and the Pentagon. Mütercimler was detained during the Ergenekon investigation for questioning before being released.
