= Counter-Guerrilla =

Turkish branch of Operation Gladio

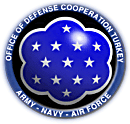
Seal of the U.S. Office of Defense Cooperation. The 13 stars represent the original 13 US states, and indicate a United States Department of Defense organization (see seal).

Counter-Guerrilla (Turkish: Kontrgerilla) is a Turkish branch of Operation Gladio, a clandestine stay-behind anti-communist initiative backed by the United States as an expression of the Truman Doctrine. The founding goal of the operation was to erect a stay-behind guerrilla force to undermine a possible Soviet occupation. The goal was soon expanded to subverting communism in Turkey.

The Counter-Guerrilla initially operated out of the Turkish Armed Forces' Tactical Mobilization Group (Turkish: Seferberlik Taktik Kurulu, or STK). In 1967, the STK was renamed to the Special Warfare Department (Turkish: Özel Harp Dairesi, ÖHD). In 1994, the ÖHD became the Special Forces Command (Turkish: Özel Kuvvetler Komutanlığı, ÖKK).

The military accepts that the ÖKK is tasked with subverting a possible occupation, though it denies that the unit is Gladio's "Counter-Guerrilla", i.e., that it has engaged in black operations. After the dissolution of the Soviet Union, the Counter-Guerrilla were used to fight the militant Kurdistan Workers' Party (PKK) (cf. Susurluk scandal), which has since its inception been regarded as a major threat by the deep state in Turkey. Mehmet Ali Agca was part of the group in the late 1970s.

Counter-Guerrilla's existence was revealed in 1971 by survivors of the Ziverbey incident, and officially on 26 September 1973 by Prime Minister Bülent Ecevit. The subject has been broached by parliament at least 27 times since 1990, however no successful investigation has taken place. Deputies of the incumbent party in any given administration always voted in dissent.

== Background ==
Anatolia's geostrategic value has long attracted players of the New Great Game. After the Yalta and Potsdam Conferences in 1945, Joseph Stalin sent naval ships and troops to the region with his sights set on the Dardanelles. In 1946, the Soviet Union sent two diplomatic notes concerning the Montreux Convention Regarding the Regime of the Turkish Straits, arguing that its terms were unfavorable to the Soviets. Ankara dismissed the notes, and the US also expressed its dissatisfaction with Soviet demands, stating that "Should the Straits become the object of attack or threat of attack by an aggressor, the resulting situation would constitute a threat to international security and would clearly be a matter for action on the party of the Security Council of the United Nations."

== Development of US-Turkish military cooperation ==
After the British government declared on 21 February 1947 its inability to provide financial aid (though she would establish the Central Treaty Organization a decade later), Turkey turned towards the United States, who drew up the Truman Doctrine, pledging to "support free peoples who are resisting attempted subjugation by armed minorities or by outside pressures". $100 million was appropriated two months after the US Congress ratified the Truman Doctrine on 12 March 1947. This figure was raised to $233 million by 1950, after Turkey contributed a brigade of about 5000 men to the United Nations forces in the Korean War. In August 1947, the Joint American Military Mission for Aid to Turkey (JAMMAT) was established in Ankara under the authority of the US ambassador.

On 5 October 1947, a delegation of senior Turkish military officials traveled to the United States to establish the military framework of the co-operation agreement.

In December 1947, United States National Security Council (NSC) Directive 4-A "secretly authorised the CIA to conduct these officially non-existent programs and to administer them" in such a way that "removed the U.S. Congress and public from any debate over whether to undertake psychological warfare abroad". A few months later, the NSC replaced directive 4-A with directive 10/2, creating the Office of Policy Coordination (OPC, initially euphemistically called the "Office for Special Projects"), the covert action arm of the Central Intelligence Agency (CIA). The OPC's charter unambiguously called for "propaganda, economic warfare; preventative direct action, including sabotage, anti-sabotage, demolition and evacuation measures; subversion against hostile states, including assistance to underground resistance movements, guerrillas and refugee liberations [sic] groups, and support of indigenous anti-communist elements in threatened countries of the free world." In the words of career intelligence officer William Corson, "no holds were barred... all the guys on the top had said to put on the brass knuckles and go to work."

After joining the North Atlantic Treaty Organization (NATO) on February 18, 1952, Turkey signed a Military Facilities Agreement on 23 June 1954, paving the way for a large scale US military presence. With a staff of 1200 by 1959, JAMMAT was the largest of the United States European Commands (USEUCOM), and also the world's largest military assistance and advisory group by 1951. JAMMAT was renamed to Joint United States Military Mission for Aid to Turkey (JUSMMAT) in 1958, and the Office of Defense Cooperation Turkey (ODC-T) (Turkish: ABD Savunma İşbirliği Ofisi) on 1 May 1994.

== Tactical Mobilization Group (1952–1965) ==
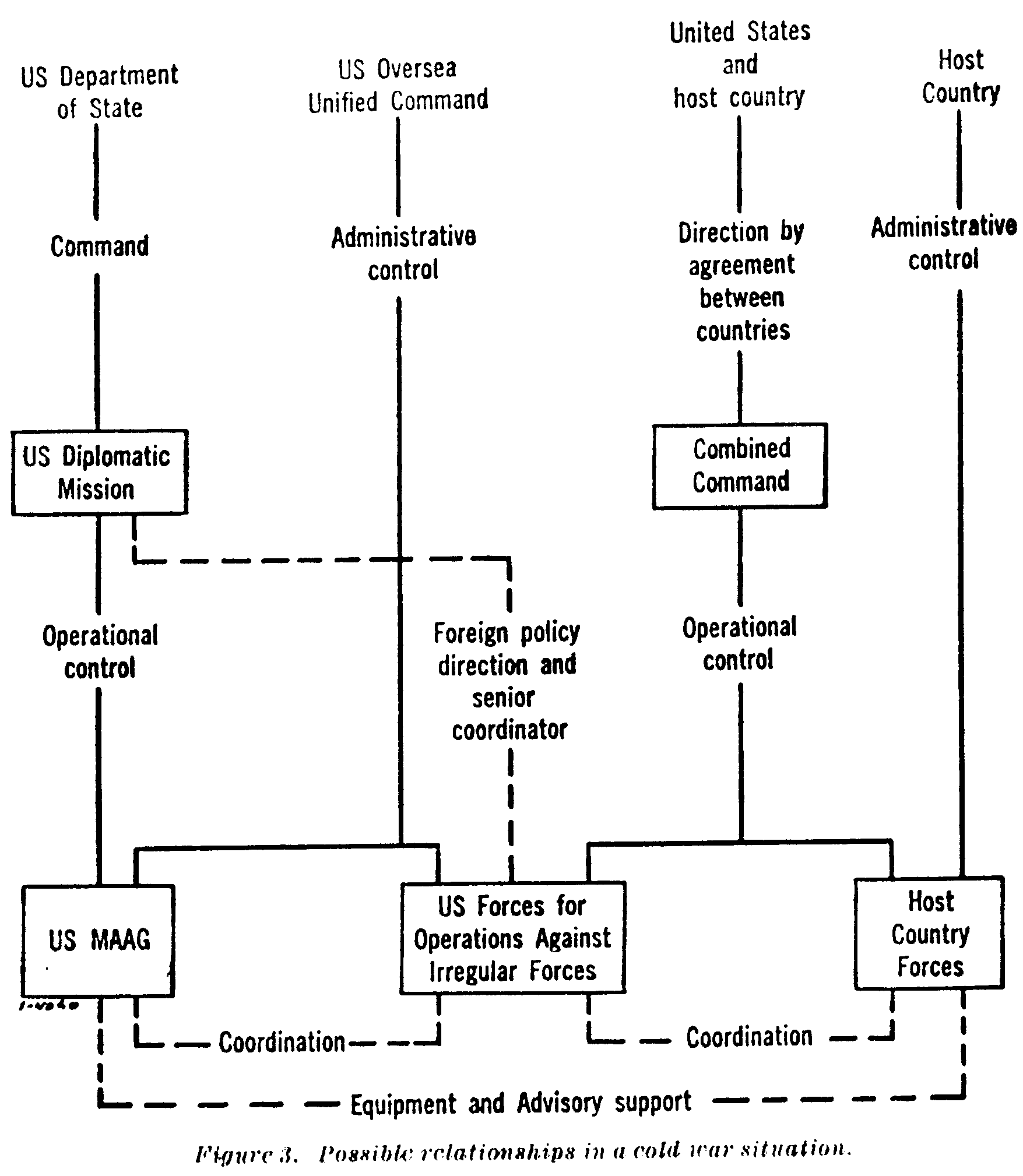
The command structure of the Counter-Guerrilla, as suggested in Field Manual 31-15: Operations Against Irregular Forces. The Host Country in this case is Turkey.

With the consent of the National Defense Supreme Council (Turkish: Milli Savunma Yüksek Kurulu), brigadier general Daniş Karabelen founded the Tactical Mobilization Group (Turkish: Seferberlik Taktik Kurulu, or STK) on 27 September 1952. Karabelen was one of sixteen soldiers (including Turgut Sunalp, Ahmet Yıldız, Alparslan Türkeş, Suphi Karaman, and Fikret Ateşdağlı) who had been sent to the United States in 1948 for training in special warfare. These people were to form the core of the Special Warfare Department (Turkish: Özel Harp Dairesi, or ÖHD). It has been said that the training also entailed an element of CIA recruitment.

Some full generals that later ran the department were Adnan Doğu, Aydın İlter, Sabri Yirmibeşoğlu, İbrahim Türkgenci, Doğan Bayazıt, and Fevzi Türkeri. Karabelen picked Ismail Tansu as his right-hand man, and they expanded the STK in a cellular fashion. They filled the ranks, mostly with reserve officers, inducted them with an oath, and educated them before allowing them to return to civilian life. The officers were given no weapons, funding, or immediate task. The recruitment was more concentrated in the east, where an invasion was most likely to occur.

Books used to educate the officers included:

- David Galula's famous Counterinsurgency Warfare: Theory and Practice. Translated in Turkish as Ayaklanmaları Bastırma Harekâtı: Teori ve Pratik per orders from then chief of the ÖHD, major general M. Cihat Akyol.
- U.S. Army Field Manual 31-15: Operations Against Irregular Forces. Translated into Turkish as Sahra Talimnamesi 31-15: Gayri Nizami Kuvvetlere Karşı Harekat, and put into practice on 25 May 1964 per orders from general Ali Keskiner.
- Senior infantry colonel Cahit Vural's Gerillaya Giriş (1972).

Later, the generals formed the Turkish Resistance Organization to counter the Greek Cypriot EOKA. Operating under the authority of the Chief of the General Staff, the STK was quartered in the JUSMMAT (Turkish: Amerikan Askerî Yardım Heyeti) building in Bahçelievler, Ankara. Ismail Tansu says that the American headquarters were facing the old Gülhane building, and that the STK's headquarters were in a villa near Kolej, Kızılay. He also said that he used to meet soldiers from the J3 Operations Directorate a few times a week, alternating between their bases. Some of his associates were colonel Latent, captain Berger, and major Hill.

In the 1960s, Türkeş established the "civilian" Associations for Struggling with Communism (Turkish: Komünizm ile Mücadele Dernekleri) and funded the far-right National Movement Party (Turkish: Milliyetçi Hareket Partisi, MHP). These formed the core of future ultra-nationalist militants, used by the Counter-Guerrilla in destabilizing events.

The CIA employed people from the far right, such as Pan-Turkist SS-member Ruzi Nazar (father of Sylvia Nasar), to train the Grey Wolves (Turkish: Ülkücüler), the youth wing of the MHP. Nazar was an Uzbek born near Tashkent who had deserted the Red Army to join the Nazis during World War II in order to fight on the Eastern Front for the creation of a Turkistan. After Germany lost the war, some of its spies found haven in the U.S. intelligence community. Nazar was such a person, and he became the CIA's station chief to Turkey.

The STK became the Special Warfare Department (Turkish: Özel Harp Dairesi, ÖHD) in 1967.

== Special Warfare Department (1965–1992) ==
=== Search for funding ===
During the 1970s, the Special Warfare Department (Turkish: Özel Harp Dairesi) was run by General Kemal Yamak. In his memoirs he stated that the United States had set aside around $1m worth of support; part munitions, part money. This arrangement continued until 1973-4, when Yamak decided the munitions did not meet the department's needs. The Americans allegedly retorted that they were footing the bill, and had right of decision. Yamak left the meeting and expressed his concerns to the Chief of General Staff, Semih Sancar, and the agreement was subsequently annulled.

It was only when Yamak asked prime minister Bülent Ecevit for an alternative means of funding did Ecevit became aware of the operation's existence; the other members of the cabinet remained in the dark. Ecevit suggested that the organization seek support from Europe. Yamak contacted generals from the United Kingdom, followed by France. The commander of the Turkish army at the time, General Semih Sancar, informed him the U.S. had financed the unit as well as the National Intelligence Organization since the immediate post-war years.

== Special Forces Command (1992–present) ==
=== Post-USSR ===
In the early 1990s, Turkey and United States were at loggerheads over the Kurdish issue. In order to reduce U.S. influence over the Turkish military, chief of staff Doğan Güreş restructured the ÖHD and renamed it to the Special Forces Command (Turkish: Özel Kuvvetler Komutanlığı, or ÖKK) in 1992. The ÖKK, whose 7000+ recruits are nicknamed the "Maroon Berets" (Turkish: Bordo Bereliler), combats terrorism and protects the chiefs of staff and the president on trips abroad. Similarly, civilian counter-guerrillas are collectively named the White Forces (Turkish: Beyaz Kuvvetler).

In 1993, the parliament formed a commission (Turkish: Faili Meçhul Cinayetleri Araştırma Komisyonu) to investigate the numerous unsolved murders believed to be perpetrated by the Counter-Guerrilla. Their report enumerated 1797 such deaths; 316 in 1992 and 314 in 1993 alone. General Güreş contacted the Speaker of Parliament, Hüsamettin Cindoruk, to stop the investigation in order to prevent the outing of his men. Meanwhile, State Security Court prosecutor Nusret Demiral ordered the police force not to co-operate with the parliamentary commission in solving the crimes.

Turkey maintains strong military ties with the U.S., through the Office of Defense Cooperation Turkey (ODC-T), whose leader is "the single point of contact with the Turkish General Staff regarding all United States military organizations and activities in Turkey". As of 2008, this position is held by major general Eric J. Rosborg. Since 1993, the chiefs of the ODC-T have been U.S. Air Force generals. The offices of the ODC-T are located at Kirazlıdere Mevkii, İsmet İnönü Bulvarı No. 94, Balgat, 06100 Ankara.

== Incidents ==
=== Istanbul pogrom ===
In 1955, members of the ÖHD participated in planning the Istanbul Pogrom, which promoted both the state's secret policy of Turkification, and the subversion of Communism.

=== Coups of 1971 and 1980 ===
After the military coup in 1960, yet another plot was found by National Intelligence Organization (MİT) agent Mahir Kaynak, who in early 1971 informed both Joint Chiefs of Staff, General Memduh Tağmaç and also the fiercely anti-communist Commander of the First Army based in Istanbul, General Faik Türün, who was a veteran of Korean War and was decorated personally by General Douglas MacArthur there. The information conveyed to them was that a number of high-ranking Turkish officers, including the Army Chief of Staff and the Air Force Chief of Staff were planning to execute a military coup on 9 March 1971 with the media support of pro-Soviet leftist intellectuals in a number of Turkish newspapers.

On 10 March 1971, the CIA sent the State and Defense departments a cable stating that the Turkish high command had convened that day resolving to carry out a counter-coup.

The 1971 coup on 12 March was executed to forestall a Soviet supported left-wing coup originally planned to take place on 9 March 1971.

Immediately after the coup, Soviet leaning intellectuals, civilian and non-ranking participants in the 9 March plot were interrogated in a building allegedly belonging to the MİT (see the next section). One 9 March plotter, colonel Talat Turhan, was interrogated by the chief of the MİT, Eyüp Ozalkus. Turhan expended much effort on exposing the Counter-Guerrilla after his release.

It has been alleged that the groups of plotters were in fact two facets of the same organization.

The counter-guerrilla engaged in sporadic acts of domestic terror throughout the 1970s, serving as a pretext for yet another coup in 1980. By the time it took place, this third military coup in the short history of Turkish democracy (1950–1980) was seen as necessary by the unwitting public to restoring peace. It was also encouraged by members of Parliament, many of whom had joined the Counter-Guerrilla in their youth.

With this coup firm steps were taken to bring the country under the military's heel. A stifling constitution was drafted, a Supreme Education Council was established to bring intellectuals into line, and the National Security Council was beefed up to do the same for politicians.

After having served his role in instigating the 1980 coup, Alparslan Türkeş was jailed by the high command. In fact, General Madanoğlu intended to execute him by a firing squad, but his friend Ruzi Nazar (of the CIA) intervened.

=== Ziverbey villa ===
After the 1971 coup d'état, the Ziverbey villa in Erenköy, Istanbul was used to interrogate Turkish communists. The mastermind behind Ziverbey interrogations was brigadier general Memduh Ünlütürk, working under Lieutenant General Turgut Sunalp, who was reporting to the Commander of the First Army, General Faik Türün. The latter two generals were Korean War veterans who had served in the Operations Department (Turkish: Harekât Dairesi). The interrogation techniques they used in Ziverbey were inspired by what they had seen done to Korean and Chinese POWs during the Korean War. Prisoners were bound and blindfolded.

Intellectuals such as İlhan Selçuk (one of the 9 March conspirators) and Uğur Mumcu were tortured there. Several Ziverbey victims confirmed that the interrogators introduced themselves as "Counter-Guerrillas" and claimed to be above the law and entitled to kill. Under duress to write an apologetic statement, Selçuk famously revealed his plight using a modified acrostic which decrypted to "I am under torture". The key letter was the first of the penultimate word of each sentence in his statement.

Another prisoner, outspoken liberal Murat Belge, says that he was tortured there by Veli Küçük, who later founded JITEM and Hezbollah (Turkey) to counter the Kurdistan Workers' Party. Küçük says he could not be responsible since he was stationed in Şırnak and has been charged with colluding with another Ziverbey victim, İlhan Selçuk (see Ergenekon).

The activist film director Yılmaz Güney was also present. A friend of his in the MİT had tried to prevent him from being captured by telling his superiors that Güney was also a spy, but the ruse failed. A MİT officer who was present, Mehmet Eymür, said Güney was treated well in return for his co-operation.

General Yamak denied that the ÖHD was involved, and dismissed any notion of a "counter-guerrilla".

Ziverbey is notable for:

- being the first time the term "Counter-Guerrilla" was mentioned to anyone who was not already a member.
- revealing the fact that the counter-guerrilla co-operated with the MİT.

=== Kızıldere Operation ===
On 30 March 1972 special forces raided Kızıldere village in Niksar district, Tokat province and killed the 10 young men who had kidnapped three foreign hostages and kept them in Kızıldere. The victims included Mahir Çayan (THKP-C), Hüdai Arıkan (Dev-Genç), Cihan Alptekin (THKO), taxi driver Nihat Yılmaz, teacher Ertan Saruhan, farmer Ahmet Atasoy, Sinan Kazım Özüdoğru (Dev-Genç), student Sabahattin Kurt, Ömer Ayna (THKO) and lieutenant Saffet Alp. The three hostages (two British and one Canadian citizen) where part of GCHQ and were held in an attempt to prevent the execution of three student leaders (Deniz Gezmiş, Hüseyin İnan and Yusuf Aslan) were also killed.

Although General Yamak denied it, an active participant, hitman Metin Kaplan said that the ÖHD was responsible. He mentioned talking to general Memduh Ünlütürk (himself a Counter-Guerrilla, and infamous participant of the Ziverbey villa incident) about what to do with the Communist inmates of Maltepe prison, who were planning to escape. On the advice of two U.S. generals, they let the prisoners escape, and then take hostage three NATO officers at Ünye. This created the pretext for their assassination.

=== Taksim Square massacre ===
On 1 May 1977 the trade union confederation DİSK held a rally on Taksim Square, Istanbul with half a million participants. Unidentified people shot at the crowd and killed 36 people. The perpetrators were never caught. Prime Minister Bülent Ecevit, and member of the social democratic Republican People's Party, declared to then President Fahri Korutürk that he suspected the Counter-Guerrilla's involvement in the massacre. According to Ecevit, the shooting lasted for twenty minutes, yet several thousand policemen on the scene did not intervene. This mode of operation recalls the June 20, 1973 Ezeiza massacre in Buenos Aires, when the Argentine Anticommunist Alliance (a.k.a. "Triple A"), founded by José López Rega (a P2 member), opened fire on the left-wing Peronists.

Moreover, Ecevit himself barely survived an assassination attempt twenty days after he publicly mentioned the possibility of a secret organization being behind the massacre.

Ankara's Deputy State Attorney Doğan Öz then investigated on relationship between Alparslan Türkeş's Nationalist Movement Party (MHP) the Special Warfare Department and violent incidents of the 1970s. Doğan Öz's report stated that "Military and civilian security forces are behind all this work." It also stated that the National Intelligence Organization was complicit, and that "all these activities [were] guided by MHP members and cadres." The attorney Doğan Öz was assassinated on March 24, 1978. İbrahim Çiftçi, a member of the Grey Wolves, confessed to the crime, but his conviction was overturned by the military judicial system.

=== 16 March massacre ===
Seven students (Hatice Özen, Cemil Sönmez, Baki Ekiz, Turan Ören, Abdullah Şimşek, Hamit Akıl and Murat Kurt) were killed and 41 were injured at Istanbul University's Faculty of Pharmacy on 16 March 1978. The assailants were members of the Grey Wolves. The lawsuit was canceled in 2008 due to the statute of limitation.

=== Bahçelievler massacre ===
A group of nationalists under the leadership of Abdullah Çatlı killed seven leftist students on 9 October 1978. Çatlı was convicted in absentia.

=== Kahramanmaraş massacre ===
On 23–24 December 1978, many Alevi people were targeted and killed in a neighbourhood. Martial law was declared afterwards, and the 1980 coup followed.

=== Assassination of Musa Anter ===
Musa Anter He was a Kurdish nationalist and writer of Kurdish origin and claimed to have taken some actions against Turkey. Being a member of Revolutionary Cultural Eastern Hearths and Kurdish Institute of Istanbul Musa Anter, who received a total of 11.5 years in prison, was assassinated in 1992.

== See also ==
- CIA activities in Turkey
- Deep state
- Grey Wolves (organization)
- Turkey–United States relations
- Propaganda Due
