= Adile Sultan Pavilion =

Historic building in Istanbul, Turkey

Coordinates: 41.0136°N 29.0420°E

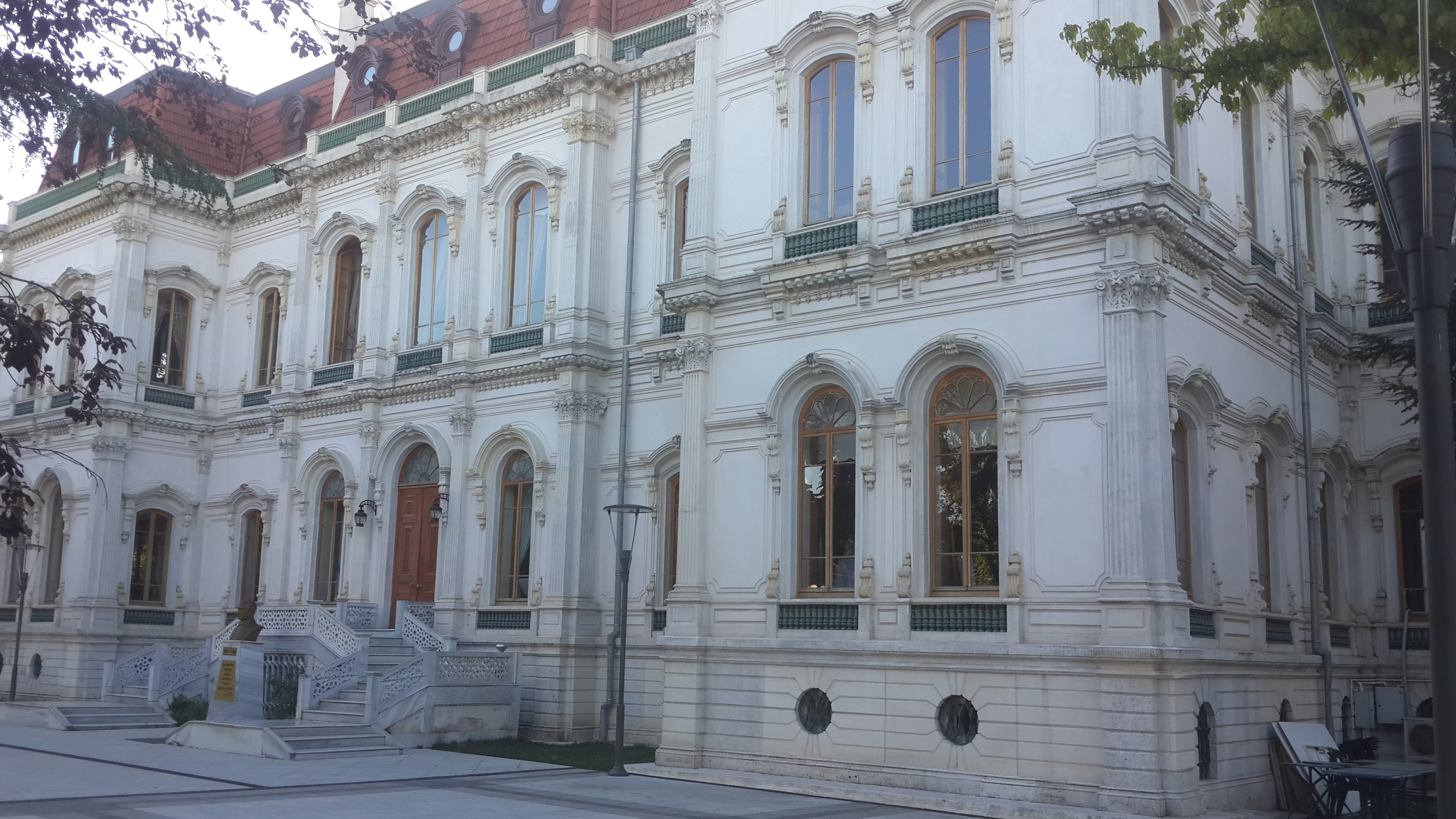
Adile Sultan Pavilion

Adile Sultan Pavilion is in Üsküdar, Istanbul, in the Validebağ Grove. It was commissioned as a summer house by Sultan Abdulaziz for his sister Adile Sultan in 1853. This rectangular building's entrance is reached by an imperial staircase. There are big halls inside the pavilion's first and second floors. The doors to both floors lead to the stairhead. It is currently used as a teachers' lodge. The popular Turkish film series Hababam Sınıfı was filmed here, and one of the rooms is used as a Hababam Sınıfı Museum. Its architect was Nigogayos Balyan, who graduated from Collège Sainte-Barbe in Paris.

== Gallery ==
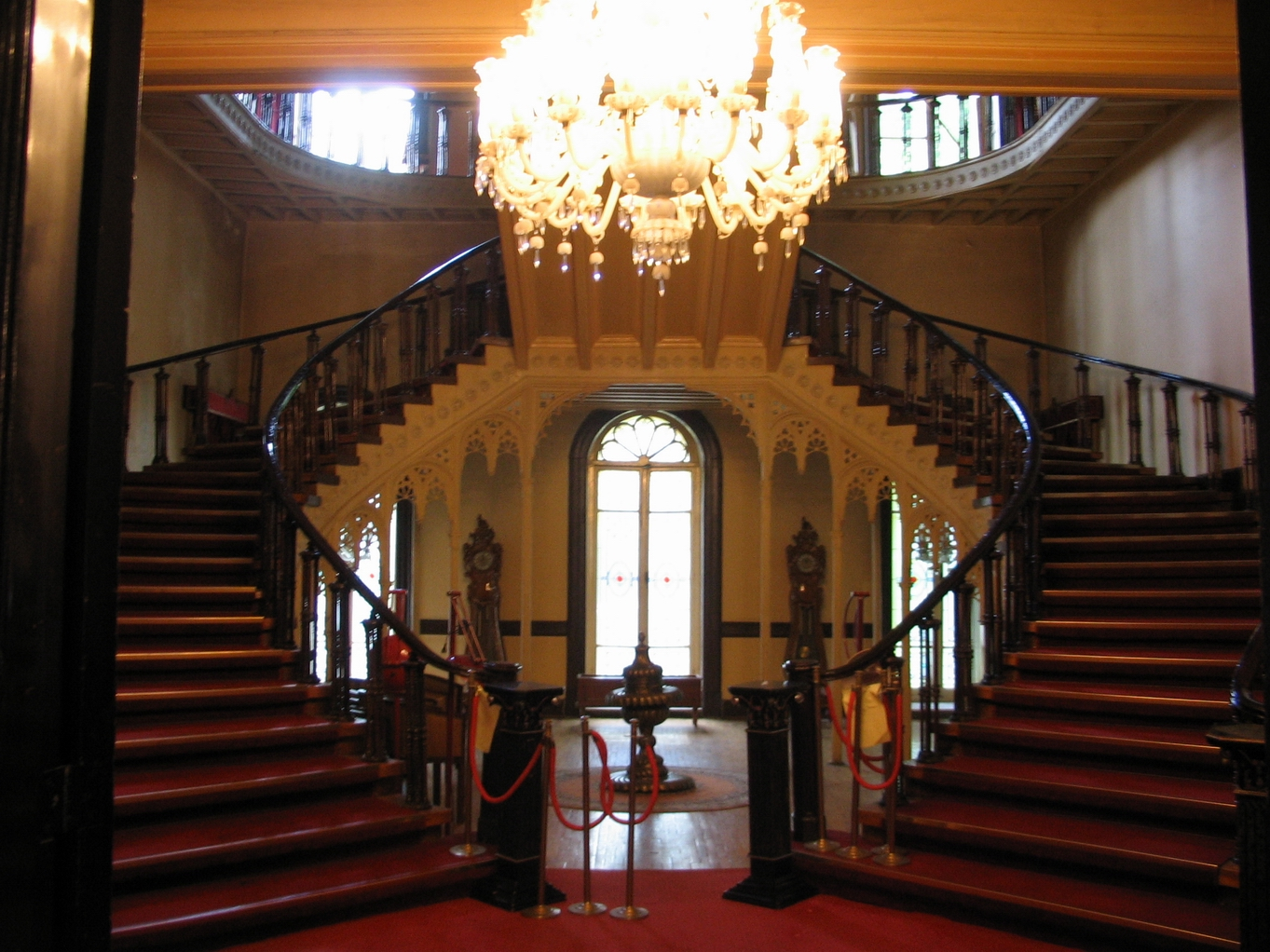
The indoors stairs

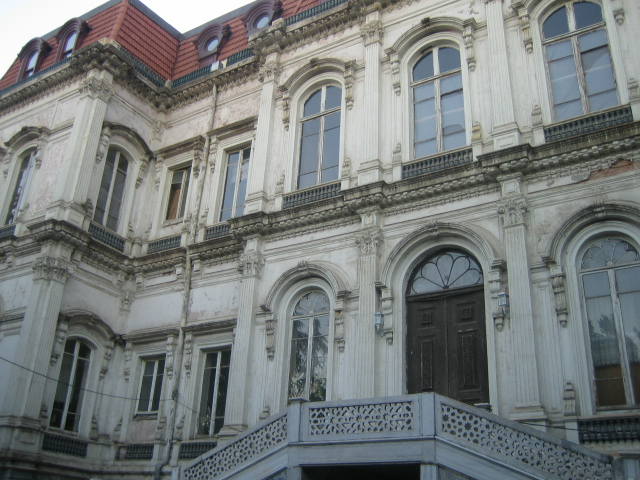
Adile Sultan Pavilion seen from the backyard

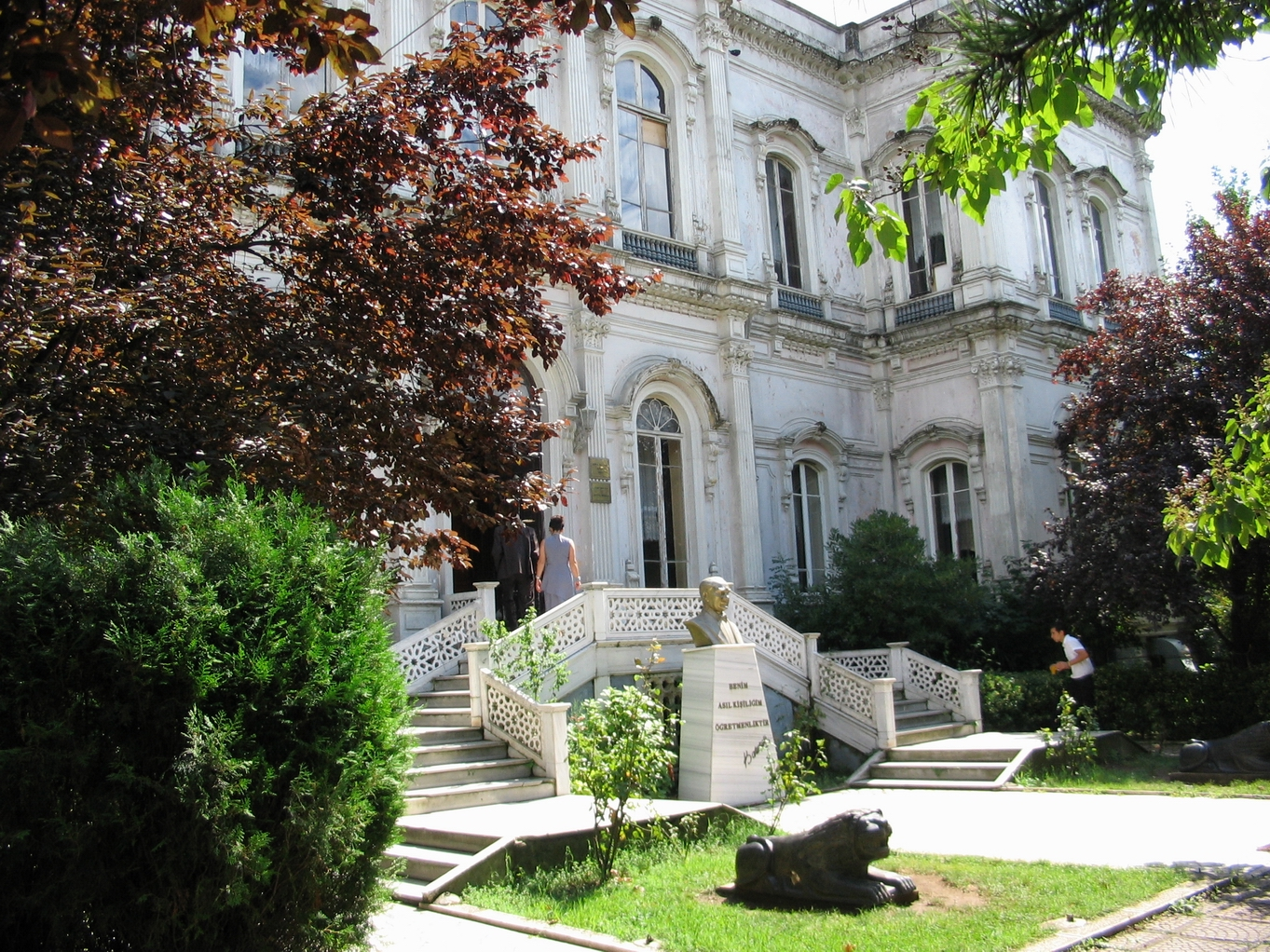
View of the outdoor stairs
