= Office of Defense Cooperation Turkey =

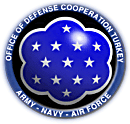
- Active: 1947 –
- Country: United States
- Type: Security Assistance Organization
- Headquarters: Bakanlıklar, Ankara, Turkey
- Nickname: ODC-T

The Office of Defense Cooperation Turkey (ODC-T, Turkish: ABD Savunma İşbirliği Ofisi) to Turkey is a United States Security Assistance Organization (SAO) to Turkey. It was established in 1947 as the Joint American Military Mission for Aid to Turkey (JAMMAT), and renamed the Joint United States Military Mission for Aid to Turkey (JUSMMAT) in 1958. It became the ODC-T in 1994. After Turkey joined NATO in 1952, JAMMAT became the largest of the United States European Commands (USEUCOM).

== History ==
After the British government declared on 21 February 1947 its inability to provide financial aid (though she would establish the Central Treaty Organization a decade later), Turkey turned towards the United States, who drew up the Truman Doctrine, pledging to "support free peoples who are resisting attempted subjugation by armed minorities or by outside pressures". $100 million was appropriated two months after the US Congress ratified the Truman Doctrine on 12 March 1947. This figure was raised to $233 million by 1950, after Turkey contributed a brigade of about 5000 men to the United Nations forces in the Korean War. In August 1947, the American Military Mission for Aid to Turkey (AMMAT) was established in Ankara under the authority of the US ambassador.

On 5 October 1947, a delegation of senior Turkish military officials traveled to the United States to establish the military framework of the co-operation agreement.

Secretary of the Army Royall suggested in about January 1949 that the coordinated U.S. Army, Navy, and Air Force Groups within AMAT be reorganized as sections of a joint military mission with a single head. (867.20 Mission/1–849). In October 1949, the Joint Chiefs of Staff issued a directive establishing the Joint American Military Mission for Aid to Turkey (JAMMAT). Major General Horace L. McBride, as senior army officer on duty, became Chief of JAMMAT.

After joining the North Atlantic Treaty Organization (NATO) on 18 February 1952, Turkey signed a Military Facilities Agreement on 23 June 1954, paving the way for a large scale US military presence.

With the creation of the stay-behind NATO Operation Gladio in the early 1950s, the Turkish component, the Special Warfare Department, was established within the JUSMATT building.

With a staff of 1200 by 1959, JAMMAT was the largest of the United States European Commands (USEUCOM), and also the world's largest military assistance and advisory group by 1951.

It was reported in December 1958 that Maj Gen Armistead D. Mead was to complete his tour as Chief of JAMMAT in June 1959. At the time, the Chief of Staff had approved Maj. Gen. Martin J. Morin, at the time commanding the 9th Infantry Division (United States) at Fort Carson, to replace General Mead.

JAMMAT was renamed to the Joint United States Military Mission for Aid to Turkey (JUSMMAT) in 1958, and the Office of Defense Cooperation Turkey (ODC-T) (Turkish: ABD Savunma İşbirliği Ofisi) on 1 May 1994.
