= Doğan Avcıoğlu =

Turkish journalist (1926-1983)

- Born: 1926; Mustafakemalpaşa, Turkey
- Died: 4 November 1983 (aged 56–57); Istanbul, Turkey
- Resting place: Büyükada, Istanbul
- Education: Political sciences and economy
- Occupations: Journalist, writer
- Political party: Republican People's Party
- Movement: Kemalism, Marxism, Socialism, Doganism
- Spouse: Sevil (Yurdakul) Avcıoğlu
- Children: 2

Doğan Avcıoğlu (1926 – 4 November 1983) was a Turkish writer, journalist and politician.

== Biography ==
Doğan Avcıoğlu was born in Mustafakemalpaşa district of Bursa Province in 1926. After completing high school, he traveled to France for studies in political science and economy. He returned to Turkey in 1955. In 1956, he began writing in political magazines such as Akis. He joined the Republican People's Party (CHP). He served in the research bureau of the party and wrote in the party paper Ulus. In 1961, he served in the Constituent Assembly of Turkey as a CHP representative. Between 1963 and 1965, he served in the research bureau of TÜRK-İŞ, the Confederation of Turkish Trade Unions. Between 1968 and 1969, he was a member of the consultative committee of CHP. Following the 1971 Turkish military memorandum, he was arrested, but was acquitted.

He died on 4 November 1983 in Istanbul from stomach cancer. He was buried in Büyükada.

== Periodicals ==
Avcıoğlu was among the contributors of the Forum magazine in the 1950s. Between 1961 and 1967, he collaborated with Mümtaz Soysal and Cemal Reşit Eyüboğlu to publish Yön, a political magazine, which was an important socialist periodical. Between 1969 and 1971, he published Devrim, a weekly newspaper on the same track.

== Books ==
He wrote a number of books some in several volumes:

- Atatürkçülük Milliyetçilik, Sosyalizm ("Kemalism, Nationalism, Socialism")
- Devrim ve Demokrasi Üzerine ("On Revolution and Democracy")
- Türkiye'nin Düzeni ("The Order of Turkey")
- Milli Kurtuluş Tarihi ("History of National Salvation")
- 31 Martta Yabancı Parmağı ("Foreign Intervention in the 31 March Incident")
- Osmanlı'nın Düzeni ("The Order of the Ottoman Empire")- post mortem book
- Türklerin Tarihi 5 Cilt ("History of Turks 5 Volumes")
