= İlhan Selçuk =

Turkish journalist, lawyer

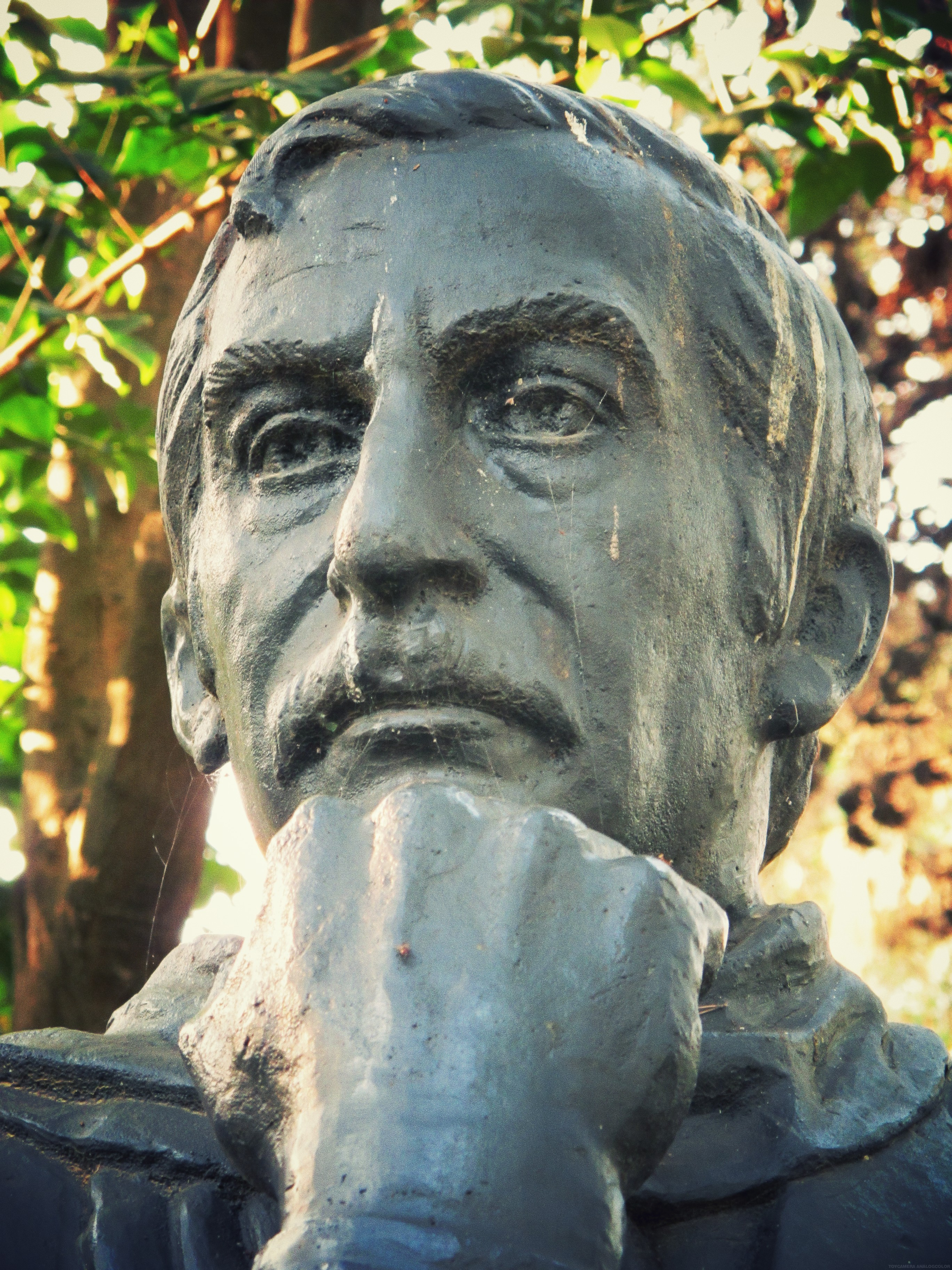
- Statue of Selçuk in Özgürlük Park, Istanbul
- Born: 11 March 1925; Aydın, Turkey
- Died: 21 June 2010 (aged 85); Istanbul, Turkey
- Occupations: Lawyer, journalist, editor
- Known for: Editor of Cumhuriyet

İlhan Selçuk (11 March 1925 – 21 June 2010) was a Turkish lawyer, journalist, author, novelist and editor.

== Biography ==
Selcuk was born in the western Turkish Aydın Province in 1925. His mother, who was Armenian, hid her Armenian roots. He earned a law degree from Istanbul University in 1950. He began writing for magazines and newspapers after his graduation. He also authored numerous books and novels. His works included Ağlamak ve Gülmek (Laughing and Crying), Japon Gülü (Japanese Rose), Ziverbey Köşku (Ziverbey Mansion), Güzel Amerikalı (The Beautiful American) and Düşünüyorum Öyleyse Vurun (I Think, Therefore Shoot Me).

Selcuk was a contributor of a political magazine, Yön, which was in circulation between 1961 and 1967. He was detained and tortured at the Ziverbey Villa after the 1971 Turkish coup d'état.

Selcuk was the editor in chief of the Cumhuriyet, a secular Turkish daily newspaper. He was detained on 21 March 2008, as part of the Ergenekon investigation. Colleagues and opposition politicians, including Kemal Kılıçdaroğlu, the leader of the Republican People's Party, blamed Selcuk's detention and investigation for Selcuk's declining health and death. Selcuk was released the following day and placed on trial without an arrest.

İlhan Selçuk died in Istanbul of multiple organ failure on 21 June 2010, at the age of 85. He had been hospitalized at the Vehbi Koç Foundation American Hospital since 24 January 2010, for treatment of ischemic brain disease and a recent stroke. Selçuk was buried in the Hacıbektaş district of Nevşehir next to his brother, Turhan Selçuk, a caricaturist who died in March 2010.
