= International Festival of the Humor of Bordighera =

The International Festival of the Humor of Bordighera (Italian: Salone Internazionale dell'Umorismo di Bordighera) was one of the main festivals devoted to humor, satire, comic strips and cartoons in Europe.

== History ==
Conceived after World War II by the journalist Cesare Perfetto, it was inaugurated in 1947 and ran 52 times up to 1999. The main awards were the Golden Palm and the Golden Date, jointly with the prestigious awards of the Presidency of the Italian Republic and the Council of Europe.

In a few years, the Festival achieved a widespread reputation, becoming a reference for many humorists worldwide, between which many from Eastern Europe and China, in times when cultural exchanges where heavily restrained.

Throughout 1955 to 1964 events, the Festival was linked with the Bordighera Festival of Comedy and Humor Films.
