= 1971 Turkish military memorandum =

Military coup in Turkey

Date	12 March 1971
Location	Turkey

Belligerents
Turkish Armed Forces	32nd government of Turkey

Commanders and leaders
Memduh Tağmaç	(Turkey) Süleyman Demirel

Casualties and losses
- Hundreds of deaths and injuries

The 1971 Turkish military memorandum (Turkish: 12 Mart Muhtırası), issued on 12 March that year, was the second military intervention to take place in the Republic of Turkey, coming 11 years after its 1960 predecessor. It is known as the "coup by memorandum", which the military delivered in lieu of sending out tanks, as it had done previously. The event came amid worsening domestic strife, but ultimately did little to halt this phenomenon.

== Background ==
As the 1960s wore on, violence and instability plagued Turkey. An economic recession late in that decade sparked a wave of social unrest marked by street demonstrations, labour strikes and political assassinations. Left-wing workers' and students' movements were formed, countered on the right by Islamist and militant Turkish nationalist groups. The left carried out bombing attacks, robberies and kidnappings; from the end of 1968, and increasingly during 1969 and 1970, left-wing violence was matched and surpassed by far-right violence, notably from the Grey Wolves. On the political front, Prime Minister Süleyman Demirel's centre-right Justice Party government, re-elected in 1969, also experienced trouble. Various factions within his party defected to form splinter groups of their own, gradually reducing his parliamentary majority and bringing the legislative process to a halt.

By January 1971, Turkey appeared to be in a state of chaos. The universities had ceased to function. Students, emulating Latin American urban guerrillas, robbed banks and kidnapped US servicemen, also attacking American targets. The homes of university professors critical of the government were bombed by neo-fascist militants. Factories were on strike and more workdays were lost between 1 January and 12 March 1971 than during any prior year. The Islamist movement had become more aggressive and its party, the National Order Party, openly rejected Atatürk and Kemalism, infuriating the Turkish Armed Forces. Demirel's government, weakened by defections, seemed paralyzed in the face of the campus and street violence, and unable to pass any serious legislation on social and financial reform. The immediate spur for the coup appears to have been the discovery of another coup plot scheduled for 9 March. It involved retired general and 1960 plotter Cemal Madanoğlu, Devrim editor Doğan Avcıoğlu and a group of left-wing junior officers. The high command responded by retiring all officers below four-star general connected with the plot.

== Memorandum ==
It was in this atmosphere that on 12 March, the Chief of the General Staff, Memduh Tağmaç, handed prime minister Demirel a memorandum, really amounting to an ultimatum by the armed forces. It demanded "the formation, within the context of democratic principles, of a strong and credible government, which will neutralise the current anarchical situation and which, inspired by Atatürk's views, will implement the reformist laws envisaged by the constitution", putting an end to the "anarchy, fratricidal strife, and social and economic unrest". If the demands were not met, the army would "exercise its constitutional duty" and take over power itself. Demirel resigned after a three-hour meeting with his cabinet; veteran politician and opposition leader İsmet İnönü sharply denounced any military meddling in politics. While the precise reasons for the intervention remain disputed, there were three broad motivations behind the memorandum. First, senior commanders believed Demirel had lost his grip on power and was unable to deal with rising public disorder and political terrorism, so they wished to return order to Turkey. Second, many officers seem to have been unwilling to bear responsibility for the government's violent measures, such as the suppression of Istanbul workers' demonstrations the previous June; more radical members believed coercion alone could not stop popular unrest and Marxist revolutionary movements, and that the social and economic reformism behind the 1960 coup needed to be put into practice. Finally, a minority of senior officers concluded that progress within a liberal democratic system was impossible, and that authoritarianism would result in a more egalitarian, independent and "modern" Turkey; other officers felt they had to intervene, if only to forestall these radical elements.

The coup did not come as a surprise to most Turks, but the direction it would take was uncertain, as its collective nature made it difficult to discern which faction in the armed forces had seized the initiative. The liberal intelligentsia hoped it was the radical-reformist wing led by Air Force commander Muhsin Batur, who favoured implementing reforms envisaged by the 1961 constitution; they were thus encouraged by the memorandum. Their hopes were dashed when it turned out that the high command had taken power, animated by the spectre of a communist threat, and not a radical group of officers as in 1960. (There were rumours the high command had acted to pre-empt a similar move by junior officers; the notion was seemingly confirmed when a number of officers were retired soon afterwards.) The "restoration of law and order" was given priority; in practice this meant repressing any group viewed as leftist. On the day of the coup, the public prosecutor opened a case against the Workers' Party of Turkey for carrying out communist propaganda and supporting Kurdish separatism. He also sought to close all youth organisations affiliated with Dev-Genç, the Federation of the Revolutionary Youth of Turkey, blamed for the left-wing youth violence and university and urban agitation. Police searches in offices of the teachers' union and university clubs were carried out. Such actions encouraged vigilante action by the "Idealist Hearths", the youth branch of the Nationalist Action Party; provincial teachers and Workers' Party supporters became prime targets. The principal motive for the suppression of the left seems to have been to curb trade union militancy and the demands for higher wages and better working conditions.

The commanders who seized power were reluctant to exercise it directly, deterred by the problems that faced the Greek junta. They had little choice but to rule through an Assembly dominated by conservative, anti-reformist parties and an "above-party" government which was expected to carry out the reforms. The military chiefs would give directives from behind the scenes. To lead this government, on 19 March they chose Nihat Erim, acceptable to the Justice Party and the more conservative faction of the Republican People's Party. (This included İnönü, who embraced the generals once they picked his close associate, but the party's general secretary Bülent Ecevit was infuriated and resigned from his post. For his part, Demirel cautioned his party to remain calm.) Erim appointed a technocratic cabinet from outside the political establishment to carry out the commanders' socio-economic reform programme. The regime rested on an unstable balance of power between civilian politicians and the military; it was neither a normal elected government, nor an outright military dictatorship which could entirely ignore parliamentary opposition.

== Aftermath ==
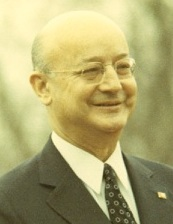
Prime Minister Nihat Erim visiting Richard Nixon at the White House a year later

In April, politics was eclipsed (and the envisaged reform put off until after 1973) when a new wave of terror began, carried out by the Turkish People's Liberation Army, in the form of kidnappings with ransom demands and bank robberies. Intelligence sources confirmed rumours that dissident junior officers and military cadets were directing this force. On 27 April, martial law was declared in 11 of 67 provinces, including major urban areas and Kurdish regions. Soon, youth organisations were banned, union meetings prohibited, leftist (but not militant neo-fascist) publications proscribed and strikes declared illegal. After the Israeli consul was abducted on 17 May, hundreds of students, young academics, writers, trade unionists and Workers' Party activists—not just leftists but also people with liberal-progressive sympathies—were detained and tortured. The consul was shot and killed four days later after a daytime curfew had been announced.

For the next two years, repression continued, with martial law renewed every two months. Constitutional reforms repealed some of the essential liberal fragments of the 1961 Constitution and allowed the government to withdraw fundamental rights in case of "abuse". The National Intelligence Organization (MİT) used the Ziverbey Villa as a torture center, employing physical and psychological coercion. The Counter-Guerrillas were active in the same building, with interrogations directed by their mainly Central Intelligence Agency-trained specialists, and resulting in hundreds of deaths or permanent injuries. Among their victims was journalist Uğur Mumcu, arrested shortly after the coup, who later wrote that his torturers informed him even the president could not touch them.

Ferit Melen, who made little impression, took over the premiership in April 1972, followed a year later by Naim Talu, whose main task was to lead the country to elections. (An important reassertion of civilian influence took place in March–April 1973, when Demirel and Ecevit, normally at odds, both rejected the generals' choice for president, instead having Fahri Korutürk elected to the post by the Assembly.) By summer 1973, the military-backed regime had achieved most of its political tasks. The constitution was amended so as to strengthen the state against civil society; special courts were in place to deal with all forms of dissent quickly and ruthlessly (these tried over 3,000 people before their abolition in 1976); the universities, their autonomy ended, had been made to curb the radicalism of students and faculty; radio, television, newspapers and the constitutional court were curtailed; the National Security Council was made more powerful; and, once the Workers' Party was dissolved in July 1971, the trade unions were pacified and left in an ideological vacuum. That May, Necmettin Erbakan's National Order Party had been shut down, which the government claimed showed its even-handedness in the anti-terror campaign, but he was not tried and allowed to resume his activities in October 1972; the National Action Party and the right-wing terrorists who worked under its aegis were left conspicuously alone.

In October 1973, Ecevit, who had won control of the Republican People's Party from İnönü, won an upset victory. Nevertheless, the very same problems highlighted in the memorandum re-emerged. A fragmented party system and unstable governments held hostage by small right-wing parties contributed to political polarization. The economy deteriorated, the Grey Wolves escalated and intensified political terrorism as the 1970s progressed, and left-wing groups too carried out acts aimed at causing chaos and demoralization (see Political violence in Turkey (1976–1980)). In 1980, seeking once again to restore order, the military carried out yet another coup.

In 2013, a monument was unveiled near the site of the Ziverbey Villa in Kadıköy. It commemorates the victims who were tortured inside the building following the coup.
