= Communist Party of Turkey – Revolutionary Wing =

Communist Party of Turkey-Revolutionary Wing (Turkish: Türkiye Komünist Partisi-Devrimci Kanat) was a short-lived splinter group of the Communist Party of Turkey. TKP-DK appeared in 1980. The founders reported that they left TKP due to its reluctance to describe the military coup of 12 September 1980 as a Fascist intervention.

== See also ==
- List of illegal political parties in Turkey
- Communist Party of Turkey (disambiguation) for other communist parties in Turkey
