= Süleyman Nuri =

Ottoman-born Russian politician (1895–1966)

Personal details
- Born: 1895
- Died: 1966 (aged 70–71) Moscow, Soviet Union
- Party: Communist Party (1920–1921)
- Education: Non-Commissioned Officers School
- Occupation: Military officer

Süleyman Nuri (1895–1966) was an Ottoman Turkish communist politician and a co-founder of the Communist Party headed by Mustafa Subhi.

== Early life and education ==
Nuri was born in 1895 into a peasant family. He was a graduate of the non-Commissioned Officers school and following his graduation he joined the Ottoman Army.

== Activities and career ==
During World War I Nuri was assigned to the army branch in Eastern Anatolia where he was injured. Following this incident Nuri left the army and joined the Russian forces in February 1917. He converted to Russian Orthodox Christianity and also, became a Russian citizen. In late 1917 he settled in Baku where he worked as a mechanic on ships. When Baku was occupied by the British in August 1918 he was arrested and detained. He was released from the prison soon and began to work for the Red Army in Dagestan which was not a success for him. He represented the Caucasus Bolsheviks at the Erzurum Congress held by Turkish revolutionaries in 1919. He was among the founders of the Communist Party which was established in Baku in May 1920. Nearly all founding figures of the party were supporters of Enver Pasha, but Nuri was not. He was part of the central committee of the party. However, he was expelled from the party soon and assigned to Armenia to help the Bolsheviks there. Nuri was arrested there by the Turkish forces, but he was sent to Baku later.

He was elected a member of the council for action and propaganda at Congress of the Peoples of the East in Baku in 1920. The same year he was jailed on Nargin Island, Soviet Azerbaijan. He served in the military-revolutionary committee and participated in the Third World Congress of the Comintern as a delegate which was held in Moscow in June to July 1921. Nuri was appointed people's commissar for justice in the first Armenian Bolshevik government of the Soviet Armenia. In 1925 he attended the Communist University of the Toilers of the East for a short time, but soon expelled together with other Turkish communists. Until 1936 Nuri worked as a mechanical engineer in Soviet Azerbaijan. Then he was sent by the Soviet authorities to Turkey for espionage activities. However, he did not manage to form a spy cell and decided to return to Baku. He was arrested by Turkish security forces while he was trying to enter Azerbaijan and was tried and sentenced to imprisonment. Following his release he left Turkey and went to Odessa in January 1958. He died in Moscow in 1966.

== Work ==
His biography book, Çanakkale Siperlerinden TKP Yönetimine. Uyanan Esirler (Turkish: From Çanakkale Trenches to TKP Management. Awakening Captives), was published in Turkey in 2002.
