= Revolutionary Union of Kurdistan =

At least two Kurdish political parties were founded as the Revolutionary Union of Kurdistan::

- The Kurdistan Freedom Party, which operates in Iran, was founded as the Revolutionary Union of Kurdistan in 1991 and changed its name in 2006
- The Revolutionary Party of Kurdistan, which operates in Turkey, was founded as the Revolutionary Union of Kurdistan after July 1998
