= TKIP =

TKIP may refer to:

- Temporal Key Integrity Protocol, an algorithm used to secure wireless computer networks
- Communist Workers Party of Turkey, TKİP, the (Türkiye Komünist İşçi Partisi)
