= Communist Party of Turkey (Workers Voice) =

Communist Party of Turkey Türkiye Komünist Partisi
- Leader: Leadership of the party is unknown.
- Founded: 1978
- Headquarters: London
- Ideology: Communism; Marxism–Leninism

Website
- http://t-k-p.net/

Communist Party of Turkey (Turkish: Türkiye Komünist Partisi) is a clandestine political party in Turkey. The party, which split from the historical Communist Party of Turkey in 1978, is often known as Communist Party of Turkey (Workers Voice); because the main publication of the party is İşçinin Sesi (Workers Voice). However the party considers itself as the continuation of the historical entity.

In 1982, the Party, along with the Kurdistan Workers Party and other left parties established the Unified Resistance Front Against Fascism (Turkish: Faşizme Karşı Birleşik Direniş Cephesi).

In the 1980s and 1990s it had strong links with the group around John Chamberlain (who uses the pen-name of "Jack Conrad") and his supporters who publish the Weekly Worker in Britain. Some members of Chamberlain's group went so far as to join the TKP.

== See also ==
- List of illegal political parties in Turkey
- Communist Party of Turkey (disambiguation) for other communist parties in Turkey
