= Yeni Dünya =

Ottoman Turkish communist magazine (1918–1921)

- Categories: Political magazine
- Publisher: Central Bureau of Muslim Socialists; Turkish Socialist Communists Party
- Founded: 1918
- First issue: 27 April 1918
- Final issue: 1921
- Country: Russia
- Based in: Moscow; Bağçasaray; Baku
- Language: Turkish

Yeni Dünya (Turkish: New World) was a communist journal which existed between 1918 and 1921 in Soviet Russia and Transcaucasia. It is known for its founder and editor, Mustafa Subhi. The journal was instrumental in gathering together the first generation of Turkish communist figures.

== History and profile ==
Yeni Dünya was established in Moscow by Mustafa Subhi who was a political exile and would be the founder of the Communist Party. Its first issue appeared on 27 April 1918. The first seven issues of the journal were published by the Central Bureau of Muslim Socialists which was an organ of the Russian Communist Party. The publisher became the Turkish Socialist Communists Party from the eighth issue dated 7 September 1918. Its publisher changed later, too. The journal was edited by Mustafa Subhi. Its headquarters moved from Moscow to Bağçasaray and then to Baku.

Yeni Dünya did not manage to gain popularity among the members of the Russian Communist Party who described it as reflecting "exclusively the moods and opinions of the petty bourgeois intelligentsia." The journal folded in 1921 after producing 67 issues. It was succeeded by another journal entitled Kızıl Şark (Turkish: Red East).
