= Revolutionary Communist Party of Turkey – Socialist Unity =

Clandestine Marxist-Leninist political party in Turkey from 1987 to 1990

Revolutionary Communist Party of Turkey – Socialist Unity (Turkish: Türkiye Devrimci Komünist Partisi-Sosyalist Birlik) was a clandestine Marxist-Leninist political party in Turkey. It was founded in 1987, following a split from the Revolutionary Communist Party of Turkey (TDKP). It was dissolved in 1990.

== See also ==
- List of illegal political parties in Turkey
- Communist Party of Turkey (disambiguation), for other groups using similar names
