= 10 September (political group) =

Turkish communist group

10 September 10 Eylül
- Founded: 1988
- Newspaper: 10 Eylül
- Ideology: Communism

10 September (in Turkish: 10 Eylül) was a communist political group in Turkey associated with the political current known as Komünist Birlik (Communist Unity). The group emerged from opposition within the Communist Party of Turkey (TKP) to the party's merger into the United Communist Party of Turkey (TBKP). It considered itself a continuation of the political legacy of the TKP. The group published a magazine called 10 Eylül, the first issue of which was published in September 1989.

== History ==
Komünist Birlik emerged from the Turkish communist movement and developed within the Communist Party of Turkey (TKP). Its political current had roots in the ÖNCÜ movement and opposed the ideological and organisational direction that led to the formation of the United Communist Party of Turkey (TBKP).

Komünist Birlik began publishing 10 Eylül openly in September 1989. In early 1991, the movement split following an internal debate known as Ne Yapmalı? (What Is to Be Done?). One group continued publishing 10 Eylül for a time, while another continued its publishing activities under the name 10 Eylül Yolu Yayıncılık.

The surviving archive includes issues 1–6, published between September 1989 and February 1990, as well as a combined issue 7–8 published in April 1990.

The magazine criticised Mikhail Gorbachev's policies and opposed what it regarded as the liquidation of the communist movement in the Soviet Union. It argued for maintaining the revolution and class struggle and advocated a Marxist–Leninist orientation for the working class, while opposing reformist movements.

In June 1996, members of the first group participated in meetings in Gümüldür concerning the re-establishment of the TKP. Following these meetings, the group became part of the political milieu that began publishing Ürün in January 1997.
