= Revolutionary Party of Kurdistan =

Kurdish nationalist political party in Turkey

Revolutionary Party of Kurdistan Partiya Şoreşa Kurdistan, (PŞK)
- Dates active: 1960–present
- Headquarters: Turkish Kurdistan
- Active regions: Turkey and Iraqi Kurdistan
- Ideology: Kurdish nationalism Marxism–Leninism
- Size: Unknown
- Wars: Kurdish–Turkish conflict

The Revolutionary Party of Kurdistan (Kurdish: Partiya Şoreşa Kurdistan (PŞK), Turkish: Kürdistan Devrim Partisi) is an illegal political party active in Turkey. The aim of the party is to create an independent state for Kurdish people based on Marxist-Leninist principles.

== History ==
Revolutionary Party of Kurdistan is a splinter of the Sociality Unity Party of Kurdistan, known as Kürdistan Sosyalist Birlik Partisi in Turkish and Partiya Yekitiya Sosyalista Kurdistane in Kurdish. Sociality Unity Party of Kurdistan annulled itself in July 1998 after a meeting in Germany. As a result, the central committee of YEKBUN or the United People's Party of Kurdistan (Kürdistan Birleşik Halk Partisi in Turkish), resident in Sweden, decided to form a new organization to carry out armed struggle against the Turkish government. However, Revolutionary Party of Kurdistan has never carried out armed struggle against the Turkish Government and has been just political party. The organization was named Revolutionary Union of Kurdistan (Kürdistan Devrim Birliği in Turkish, Yektiye Şoreşa Kurdistan in Kurdish) first. However the central committee later changed "union" with "party" thinking taking into consideration that there was no unity yet; so the Revolutionary Party of Kurdistan was born.

After the capture of Abdullah Öcalan by Turkish forces in 1999 and the resulting retreat of Kurdistan Workers Party, better known as PKK, the Party tried to attract their members, albeit without a remarkable success. The organisation was not successful either in giving a significant damage to Turkish forces or creating public awareness about themselves.

== Designation as a terrorist organisation ==
According to the Counter-Terrorism and Operations Department of Directorate General for Security (Turkish police) it is one of the 12 active terrorist organisations in Turkey and one of the three Kurdish organisations.

== See also ==
- List of political parties in Turkey
- Communist Party of Turkey (disambiguation), for other groups using similar names
