= Dragoon 300 =

Dragoon 300 AFV
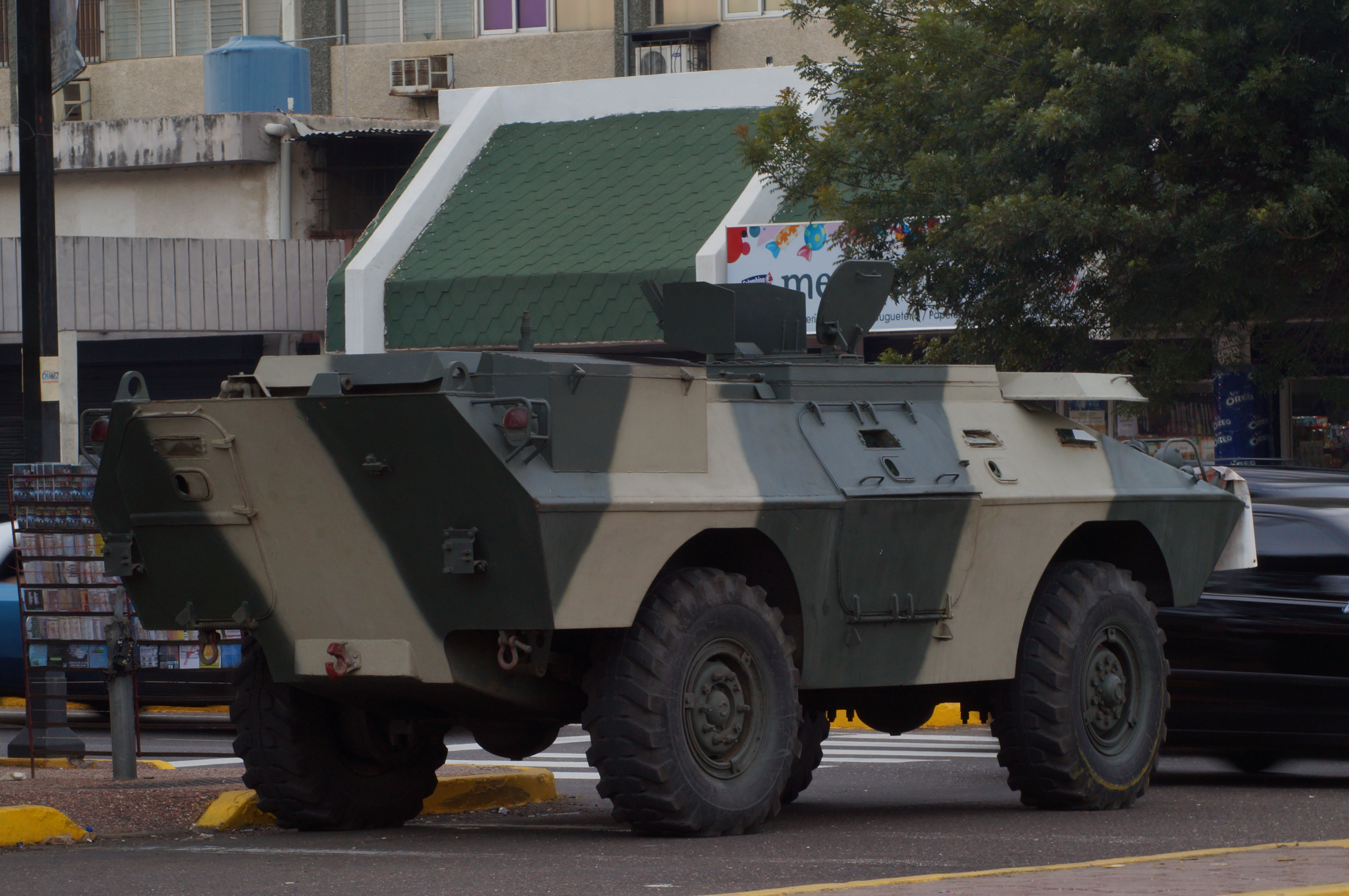
- In Maracaibo, Venezuela
- Type: Amphibious armoured vehicle
- Place of origin: United States

Service history
- In service: 1982–present
- Used by: See Operators

Production history
- Designer: Verne Corporation
- Manufacturer: Arrowpointe Corporation
- Produced: 1982-2002 (Production); 1982-2008 (Marketing)
- No. built: 400 Dragoons (1982-2002)
- Variants: See Variants

Specifications
- Mass: 12,700 kilograms (28,000 lb)
- Length: 5.89 metres (19.3 ft)
- Width: 2.49 metres (8 ft 2 in)
- Height: 2.819 metres (9 ft 3.0 in) turret roof
- Crew: 3+6
- Armor: steel
- Main armament: 1x 90 mm gun, 1 x 20 mm
- Secondary armament: 1 x 7.62 mm machine gun
- Engine: Detroit Diesel 6V-53T 6-cylinder turbocharged Diesel engine 300 bhp
- Suspension: 4x4
- Operational range: 885 kilometres (550 mi)
- Maximum speed: 116 kilometres per hour (72 mph) road, 4.8 kilometres per hour (3.0 mph) water

The Dragoon 300 AFV (armoured fighting vehicle) was produced by Arrowpointe Corporation (now General Dynamics Land Division) during the 1980s. It was based on the automotive components of the United States Army's M113 APCs and 5-ton trucks. It resembles a larger V-150 Commando.

The Dragoon is made under license in Pakistan by Heavy Industries Taxila.

== History ==
With the end of the 1960s, the United States Army's Military Police Corps expressed the need for a vehicle capable of being transported by Lockheed C-130 Hercules aircraft, intended to provide base protection, as well as carrying out convoy escort duties. This eventually led to a formal requirement being issued in 1976. However, the requirement was allowed to lapse, probably due to budgetary pressures of the time.

Despite this, one of the firms that had expressed an interest in meeting the requirement, the Verne Corporation, decided to build two prototypes of a vehicle that was initially called the Verne Dragoon and pitched it together with Arrowpointe to third party customers. These prototypes made their first public appearance in 1978. The Dragoon is of a very similar configuration to that of Cadillac Gage V-100 and the vehicles 4 X 4 general-purpose of the V-150 range, but it has several parts in common with the M113A2 tracked armored personnel carrier and the M809 series 5-ton 6x6 truck.

Verne was responsible for the Dragoon's development while Arrowpointe was responsible for marketing the vehicle. The two companies merged to form AV Technology Corporation and continued to produce and market the vehicle until its assets were taken by General Dynamics Land Systems.

While production continued until 2002, there was the option for small orders from GDLS in Spain until marketing was dropped in 2008.

== Description ==
From the M113A2, the Dragoon borrows its starter, periscopes, drain pumps, control knobs, and its electric and hydraulic components. The hull of the Dragoon is of entirely welded steel construction, ensuring crew protection against individual weapons of 5.56 and 7.62mm and against shell shrapnel. The driver sits on the left front with room for another man on his right, the crew compartment being in the center; the engine is located at the back on the right (which on the Cadillac Gage V-150 is in the left rear corner), and a passage connects the crew compartment to a door opening on the rear of the vehicle.

The soldiers enter and leave by two doors located on each side the vehicle, the lower part of these doors folding down to form a step-up, while the upper part swings clear to the side. Firing ports with periscopes are arranged on the sides and the back of the crew compartment. The diesel engine is coupled with an automatic transmission, having five forward gears and one reverse, and with a single-speed transfer case to provide power to all wheels.

The Dragoon is amphibious and is propelled in water by its wheels at a speed of 4.8 km/h, while three drain pumps remove water entering through the doors. Utilized like an armoured personnel carrier, the Dragoon is usually equipped with a turret identical to that of the M113A2 armed with a machine gun of 12.7 mm or 7.62 mm assembled on a pivot. The vehicle can also receive two-seater turrets carrying a gun of 25 or 90 mm and coaxial and anti-aircraft machine guns of 7.62 mm. There are more specialized versions of the genus, including recovery and command vehicles.

== Variants ==
This is the base hull of the LFV-90 Dragoon vehicle (see US light combat vehicles). The hull has some modifications to better suit it for use as an armored personnel carrier, and may have a pintle mount or one of several turrets. The basic APC version is used, in addition to military forces, by several police forces in the US, often with a ramming pole welded to the nose of the vehicle.

The Personnel Carrier is the base vehicle of the line, with two hatches in the front deck for the commander and gunner, a center hatch with a weapon mount directly behind those hatches for the gunner, and a large sliding hatch on the rear deck for the passengers. In addition, there are six firing ports, two on each side and one in the rear, as well as a door in either side of the passenger compartment. Among other roles that the Carrier can be used for is basic APC, reconnaissance, command, base security, convoy escort and Command and Control vehicle.

The Dragoon ACV (Armored Command Vehicle) is a Dragoon basic APC set up to be a command post carrier. In this variant, the Dragoon carries a folding worktable, at least three radios, a camouflage net, various drawers and lockers for equipment, and a 3 kW generator to run the vehicle with the engine off. The pintle-mounted machine gun is retained.

The Dragoon ALSV (Armored Logistics Support Vehicle) is a Dragoon APC fitted out as an armored truck of sorts. The load area in this vehicle is open-topped, and there is a materiel-handling crane with a capacity of 1 ton. It can carry standard NATO pallets and containers, as well as several makes of civilian ones. This vehicle is normally used to carry bulk cargo like ammunition and spare parts to forward elements, and is often found accompanying Dragoon EMVs on their rounds.

The Dragoon ASV (Armored Security Vehicle), also known as the Patroller, is the version of the Dragoon APC that is in service with several United States law enforcement agencies. The vehicle interior is a little taller to allow standing, and the weapon mount is replaced with a rotating box that carries surveillance equipment. The windows are larger, as are the firing ports and vision blocks. The vehicle is equipped with several surveillance devices, including a low-light television, video recorder, computer, shotgun microphone, and night vision gear. Many of these vehicles are equipped with pole-mounted ramming blocks mounted on the nose of the vehicle. Sirens and flashing lights complete the modifications.

The LFV-40 (Light Forces Vehicle) is a Dragoon APC with a one-man turret mounted on the deck behind the driver's hatch. This turret is armed with a heavy machine gun and an automatic grenade launcher. The LFV-50 is the same as the LFV-40, but the turret is armed with a heavy and light machine gun.

The Dragoon MGTS (multi-gun turret system) is a Dragoon APC fitted with a two-man turret armed with Bushmaster chain gun in one of three calibers and a machine gun, as well as a commander's machine gun.

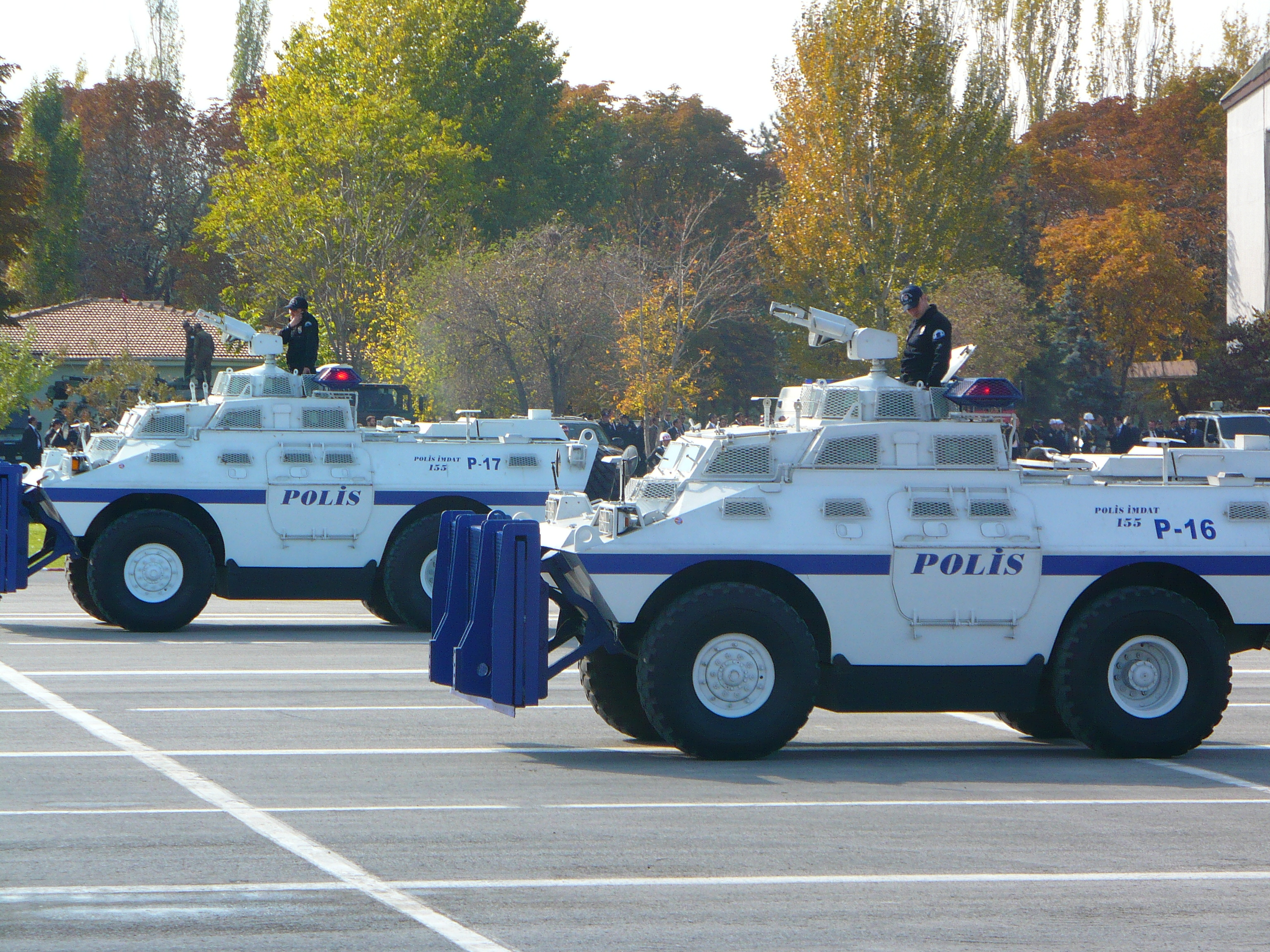
Dragoons in General Directorate of Security (Turkey) inventory modernized by Nurol Machine as TOMA vehicle's (armored water cannon designed for riot control)

=== Versions ===
The following variants are made of the Dragoon 300:

- Dragoon 300 [20 mm turret] – fitted with two-man turret armed with 20mm cannon
- Dragoon 300 [25 mm turret] – fitted with two-man turret armed with bushmaster M242 25mm cannon
- Dragoon 300 [25 mm turret variant 1] – fitted with 25mm KBA cannon in overhead mount
- Dragoon 300 [90 mm turret] – fitted with two-man turret armed with 90mm gun
- Dragoon 300 recoilless rifle carrier – version armed with multiple recoilless rifles
- Dragoon 300 [armored mortar carrier] armed with M-82A1 81mm mortar
- Dragoon 300 ACV – command vehicle version
- Dragoon 300 LERO – observation vehicle
- Dragoon 300 Trailblazer – SIGINT version
- Dragoon LFV-40 – fitted with 1M turret armed with 50 cal HMG & 40 mm grenade launcher
- Dragoon LFV-50 – fitted with 1M turret armed with 50 cal HMG and 7.62 mm LMG
- Dragoon LFV-90 – fitted with two-man turret armed with 90 mm Cockerill gun
- Dragoon LFV-APC – armoured personnel carrier version
- Dragoon LFV-MEWS – electronic warfare version fitted with Teampack
- Dragoon LFV-RMD – Dragoon converted into remotely controlled mine detector
- Patroller – version produced for use by police agencies
- Patroller [Variant 1] – police version fitted with ramming device
- Dragoon Panzer TOMA (vehicle)
- Dragoon 2 — Pakistani built multirole variant, improved tires/engines/suspension with upgrading heating/air conditioning

=== U.S. military variants ===
In 1982, the U.S. Army accepted an initial delivery of at least six Dragoons from the first production batch. An unknown number (sources differ) from this batch was procured by the United States Navy. The first Army vehicles were used by the 9th Infantry Division high technology test bed, in three forms: personnel carrier (3?), EW variant with AN/MSQ-103A Teampack system (2), and a video optical surveillance vehicle with a retractable long-range day/night surveillance system mounted in a modified Arrowpointe 25 mm two-man turret, and connected to an on-board data link. This version was intended to provide field commanders and rear line command staff with a highly mobile, armour-protected observation capability.

The electronic warfare version was apparently capable of simultaneous connections with a large (unknown) number of friendly aircraft including command and control platforms. Its primary role was advanced battlefield direction finding and high speed communications jamming, although it had other ELINT and SIGINT capabilities. It used a tall hydraulically operated mast which was normally carried in the horizontal position on the vehicle's rear left side, protected by a brush guard and a weather shield. When the Teampack system was active, the mast could be quickly deployed into the vertical position. It also carried a 7.62 mm M60 machine gun over on its right side, on the forward part of the roof.

The U.S. Navy used its vehicles to patrol a nuclear weapon storage facility in Alaska and three similar sites on the East coast of the United States. They were fitted with a 7.62 mm MG (M60/M240 most likely) with a ballistic shield and a floodlight. This version was notable for the fact that it had a double width door on both sides which opened in three parts, the lower part dropping down to form a step and the upper parts, each with a vision block and a firing port underneath, opening to each side. This was intended to allow security personnel to disembark in a hurry.

== Operators ==
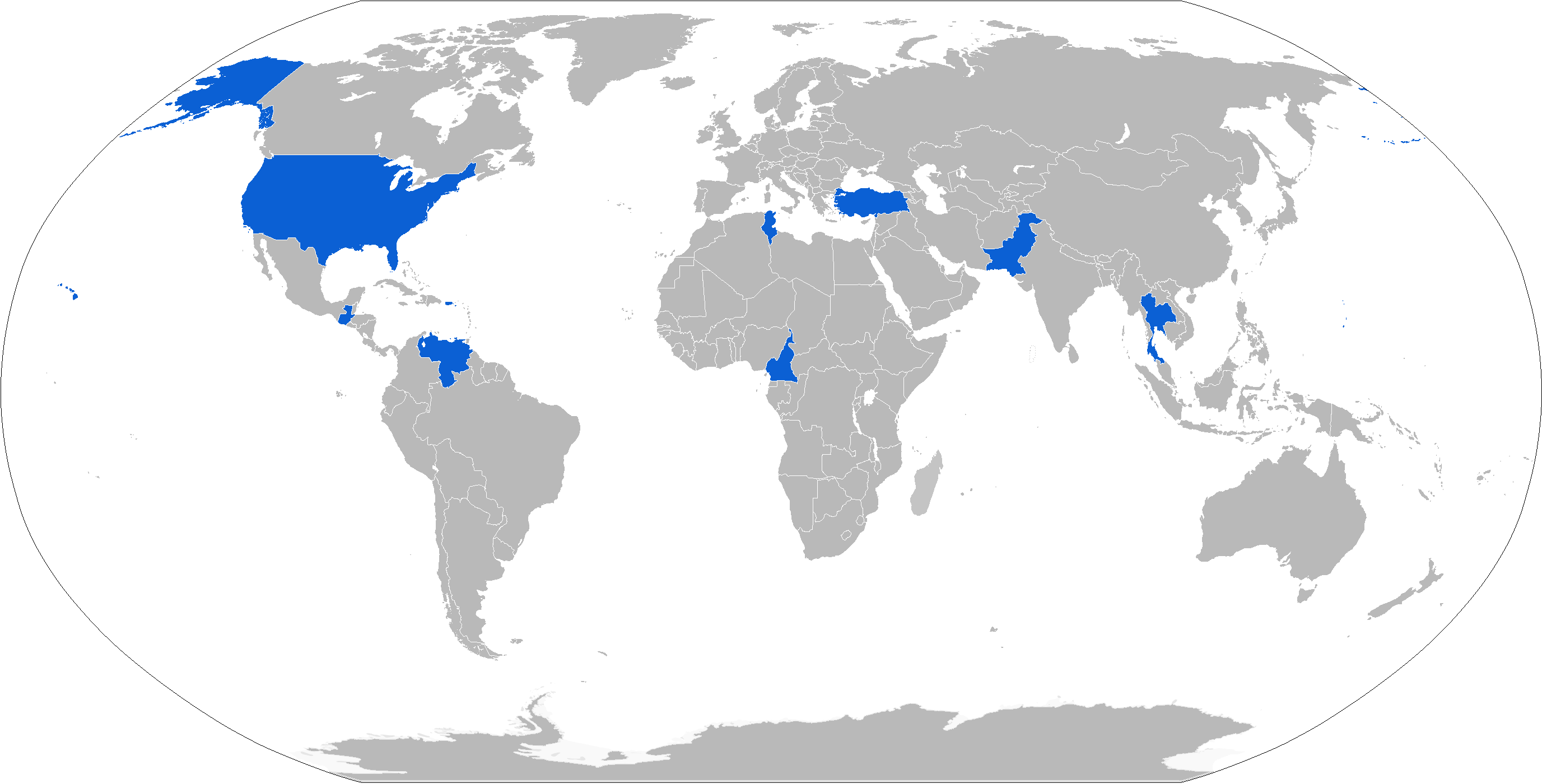
Map of Dragoon operators in blue

- Cameroon
- Colombia
- Pakistan: Mostly Dragoon 2.
- Thailand: 43
- Tunisia
- Turkey: 230
- United States
- Venezuela: 101

== Similar vehicles ==
- Steyr-Puch Pinzgauer – a Commando derived vehicle for the military police
- Chaimite – a Portuguese vehicle similar to the Commando
- Cadillac Gage Commando
- The "Hari-Digma" was a contender in the competition for a new wheeled armoured personnel carrier for the Armed Forces of the Philippines. It lost out to the Simba. There were two Hari-Digma prototypes, which differed in the location of the turret.
- The French "VXB" – built in small numbers for the National Gendarmerie and for Gabon
- BOV – a Yugoslav and Serbia manufactured vehicle
- Armadillo – based on a commercial truck chassis. Guatemala had to develop this armoured car on its own, because they couldn't purchase U.S.-made equipment. The design was obviously inspired by the Commando series. Only 18 were produced.
- DN Caballo – The DN-III (or DN-3) was the first vehicle of the Mexican DN-series that actually entered service (in 1979). The vehicle is probably based on the base of a US-made Dodge 4x4 truck and is also known as SEDENA 1000. The basic vehicle was armed with only a 7.62 mm machine gun FN MAG on top of a MOWAG-type of turret. The Mexican Army has 24 vehicles in service.
- BRDM-2 – a Soviet scout car
