= Çevik Kuvvet =

Turkish riot police unit

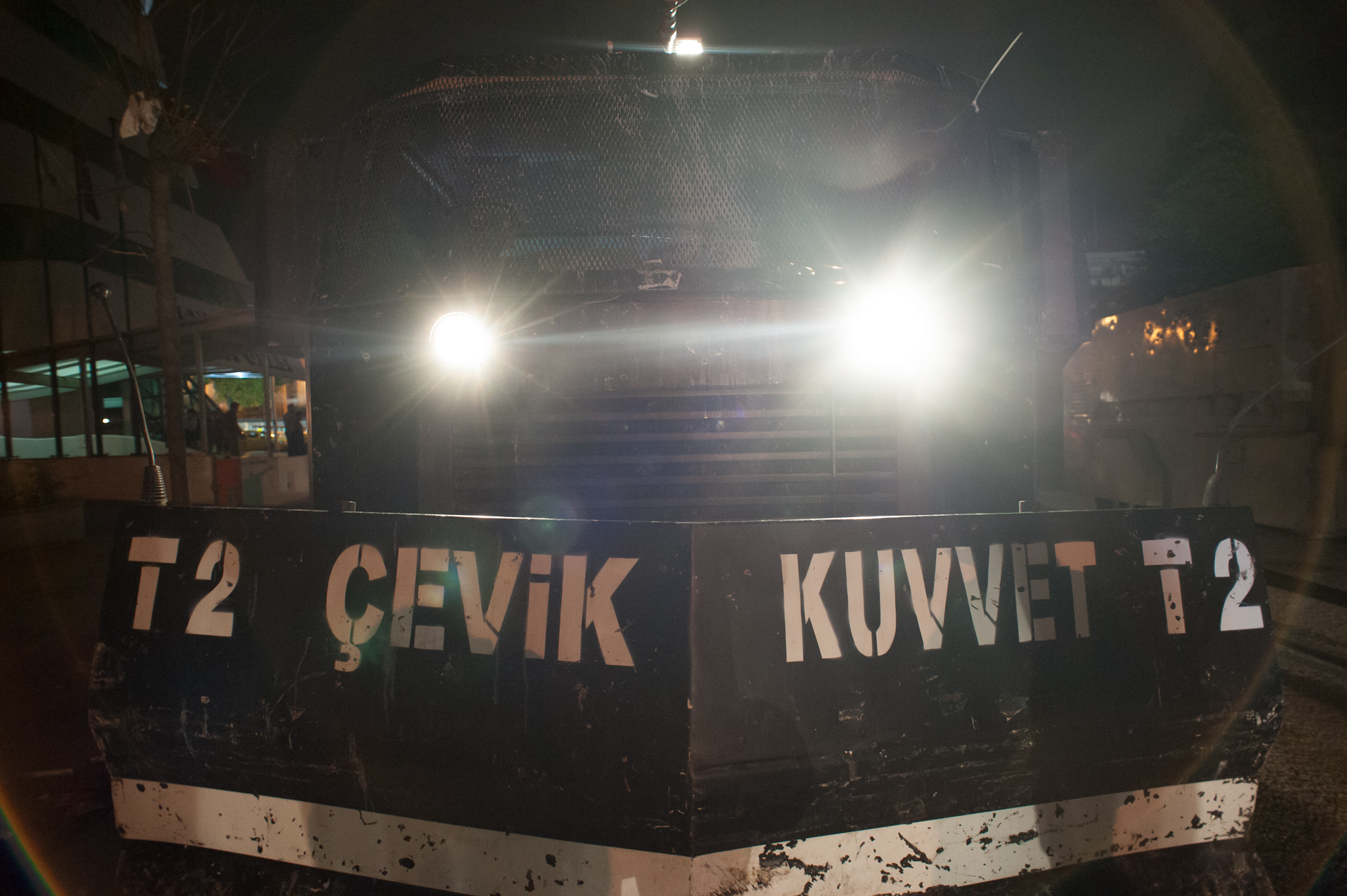
- TOMA water cannon, Ankara, 2013
- Active: since 1982
- Country: Turkey
- Type: Riot police
- Role: Riot control
- Engagements: Turkey–Islamic State conflict 2013 Turkish protests 2025 Turkish protests

The Çevik Kuvvet (lit. 'Agile Force' or 'Rapid Response Force') is the riot squad of the General Directorate of Security (Turkish National Police). It was established in 1982, replacing the Toplum Polisi.

Equipment includes TOMA water cannon vehicles, Otokar Akrep "scorpion" APCs and the FN 303 less-lethal weapon.
