= Revolutionary Communist Workers Movement of Turkey =

Revolutionary Communist Workers Movement of Turkey (in Turkish: Türkiye Devrimci Komünist İşçi Hareketi) was a clandestine Marxist-Leninist group in Turkey. TDKİH was founded in August 1989, following a split in the Revolutionary Communist Party of Turkey (TDKP). TDKİH accused the TDKP leadership of reformism.

TDKİH published Devrimci Komünist İşçi.

In March 1990 a Co-ordination Committee was established by the Communist Party of Turkey/Marxist-Leninist - Hareketi (TKP/ML-Hareketi), Communist Workers Movement of Turkey (TKİH) and TDKİH to merge into a single party. In 1991 TDKİH merged into TKİH.
