= Turkish Workers and Peasants Socialist Party =

Turkish Workers and Peasants Socialist Party Türkiye İşçi ve Çiftçi Sosyalist Fırkası
- Abbreviation: TİÇSF
- Founder: Şefik Hüsnü
- Founded: 20 September 1919 (establishment announced) 17 December 1919 (Official establishment)
- Dissolved: 1924
- Succeeded by: TİİKP
- Ideology: Communism; Marxism-Leninism
- Political position: Left-wing

The Turkish Workers and Peasants Socialist Party (Turkish: Türkiye İşçi ve Çiftçi Sosyalist Fırkası, TİÇSF) was a communist party founded in Istanbul on 22 September 1919. Şefik Hüsnü, Ethem Nejat, Ahmet Akif, Sadrettin Celal, Nafi Atuğ Kansu, Cevat Cevdet and Namık İsmail were prominent members. Because Istanbul was militarily occupied by Britain and France the party suspended its activities.

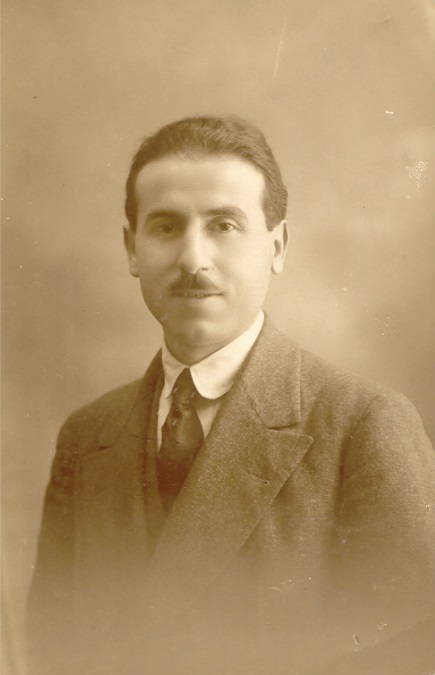
Şefik Hüsnü, prominent member

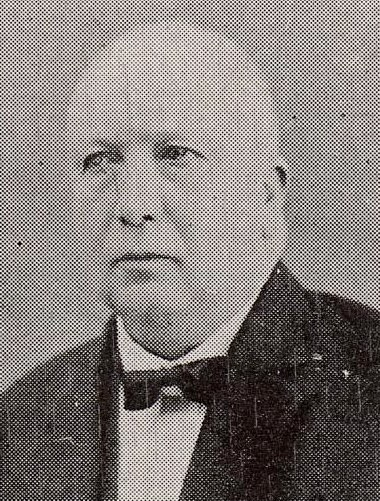
Bahri Bey, one of the founders of the party and member of the Ottoman parliament

Originally the TİÇSF gave support to Kemal Atatürk. They attended the first congress of the Communist Party of Turkey (TKP) held in Baku on 10 September 1920, where the TKP was established.

The Workers’ and Peasants’ Socialist Party, the Istanbul transplant of the party formed in Berlin in 1919, adopted a more confrontational policy towards the republican government. In 1923, after the victory over Greece, it organized the first large May Day demonstration in Istanbul. The regime responded by arresting socialist workers and intellectuals.

The party was dissolved in 1924.
