= Revolutionary Communist Party of Turkey =

Revolutionary Communist Party of Turkey Türkiye Devrimci Komünist Partisi
- Abbreviation: TDKP
- Founded: February 2, 1980
- Preceded by: THKO
- Headquarters: None (illegal organisation)
- Ideology: Communism; Marxism–Leninism; Hoxhaism; Anti-revisionism
- Political position: Far-left
- International affiliation: ICMLPO

Website
- www.tdkp.org

The Revolutionary Communist Party of Turkey (Turkish: Türkiye Devrimci Komünist Partisi, TDKP) is a clandestine Marxist-Leninist and Hoxhaist party in Turkey. TDKP considers itself to be the continuation of the People's Liberation Army of Turkey (Turkish: Türkiye Halk Kurtuluş Ordusu, THKO). The THKO Conference gathered in October 1978. It changed the name of the organisation to that of Revolutionary Communist Party of Turkey - Construction Organisation (TDKP-İÖ short for İnşa Örgütü). The split with the pro-Soviet line of the THKO, called Mücadelede Birlik ('Unity in Struggle') in 1974 is also shown as its roots. Between 1976 and 1979 the followers of THKO gathered around a legal publication called Halkın Kurtuluşu (People's Liberation) and are often known by that name. THKO passed through two splits, Bes Parçacılar left in 1976 and THKO-Aktancılar in 1977. Bes Parçacılar reunited with TDKP-IÖ in 1979. The TDKP-IÖ formally founded TDKP at a congress on 2 February 1980.

TDKP adhered to the political line of the Albanian Party of Labour.

== Publications ==
Since 1975 THKO published the journal Yoldaş/Heval (Turkish/Kurdish for "Comrade"). It was only distributed to members. After the foundation of TDKP-İÖ the journal Devrimin Sesi (Voice of Revolution) was published legally. The journal Parti Bayrağı (Flag of the Party) was another legally published monthly that appeared between 1978 and the coup d'état in 1980.

== Development after 1980 ==
In the 1970s the TKHO had a legal youth organization, known as YDGD (short for Patriotic Revolutionary Youth Association). 1976 the GKB (Genç Komünistler Birliği - Union of Young Communists) was created. Like the Emekçi Kadınlar Birliği (Union of Female Workers) it was no legal formation.

In the second half of the 1980s, TDKP was riddled with internal strife. Three factions split away from it, accusing the leadership of reformism; Revolutionary Communist Party of Turkey-Socialist Unity (TDKP-SB) in 1987, Revolutionary Communist Party of Turkey-Leninist Wing (TDKP-DK, also known as "Ekim" after its newspaper) in 1988 and Revolutionary Communist Workers Movement of Turkey (TDKIH) in 1989.

After the fall of Socialist Albania TDKP started looking more towards establishing legal structures. Emek Partisi (Labour Party) was banned in March 1996 shortly after its foundation. In its place Emeğin Partisi (Labour Party) was founded later changing its name to Emek Partisi (generally called EMEP) again.

TDKP is an active participant in the International Conference of Marxist-Leninist Parties and Organizations.

== See also ==
- List of illegal political parties in Turkey
- List of anti-revisionist groups
