= Katmerciler =

Turkish defense and automotive industry company

- Headquarters: İzmir, Turkey

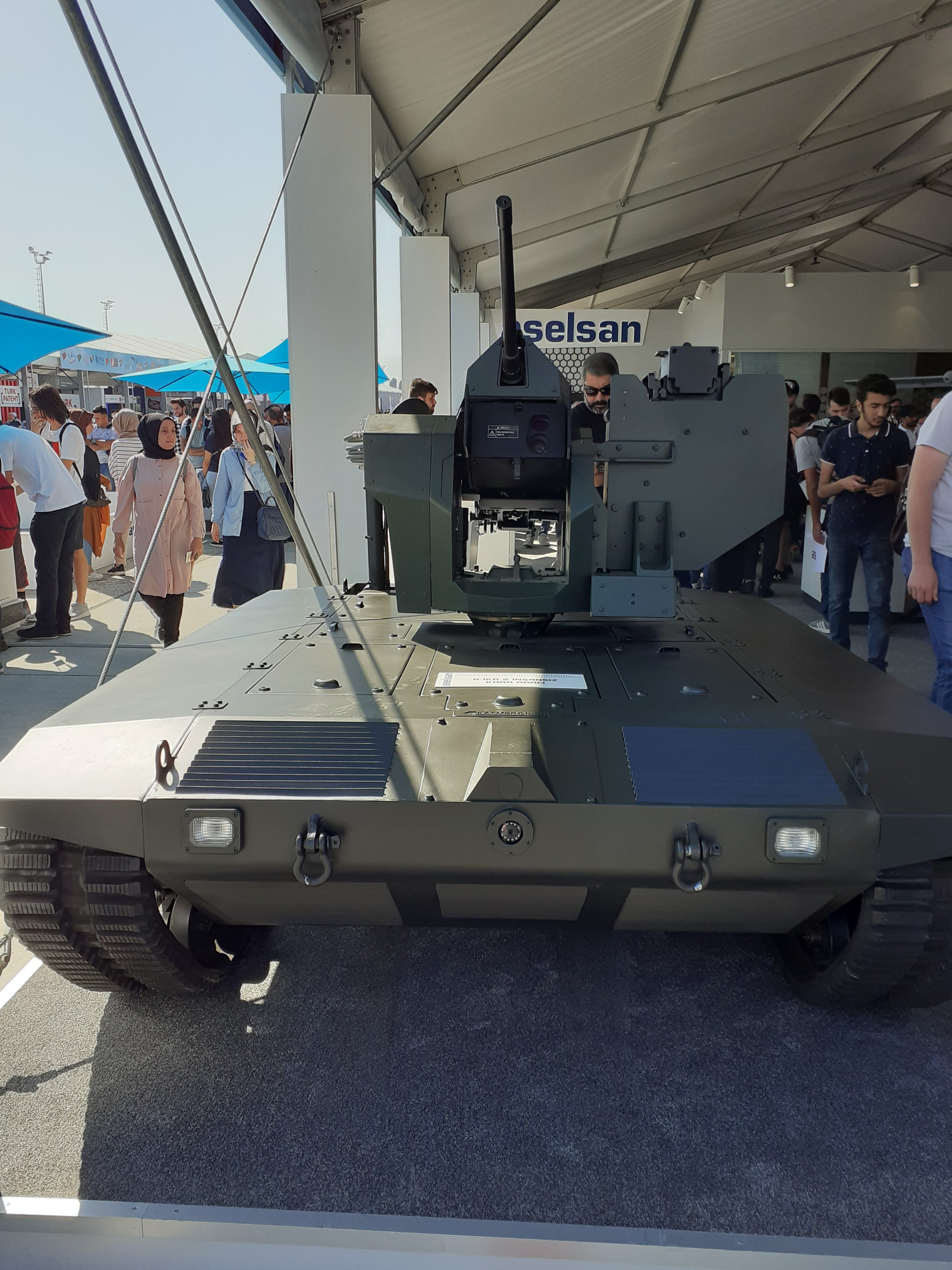
Weapon Platform (UKAP), developed by defense firms Katmerciler and ASELSAN

Katmerciler is a Turkish defense and automotive industry company established in 1985 in İzmir. The company produces Hızır 4x4 infantry mobility, riot control, sanitation, and transportation vehicles and fire trucks. Katmerciler is a provider of subsystem production and is a solution partner of automotive and truck manufacturers such as Ford, BMC, Hyundai, Isuzu, Iveco, MAN, Mercedes-Benz, Mitsubishi, Renault, Scania, and Volvo.

Katmerciler became a public company traded on Borsa Istanbul in 2010. In 2016, Katmerciler opened a production facility for R&D and production activities for the defense industry in Ankara.

Katmerciler started exporting security vehicles to Kenya in 2019/2020.

== Gallery ==
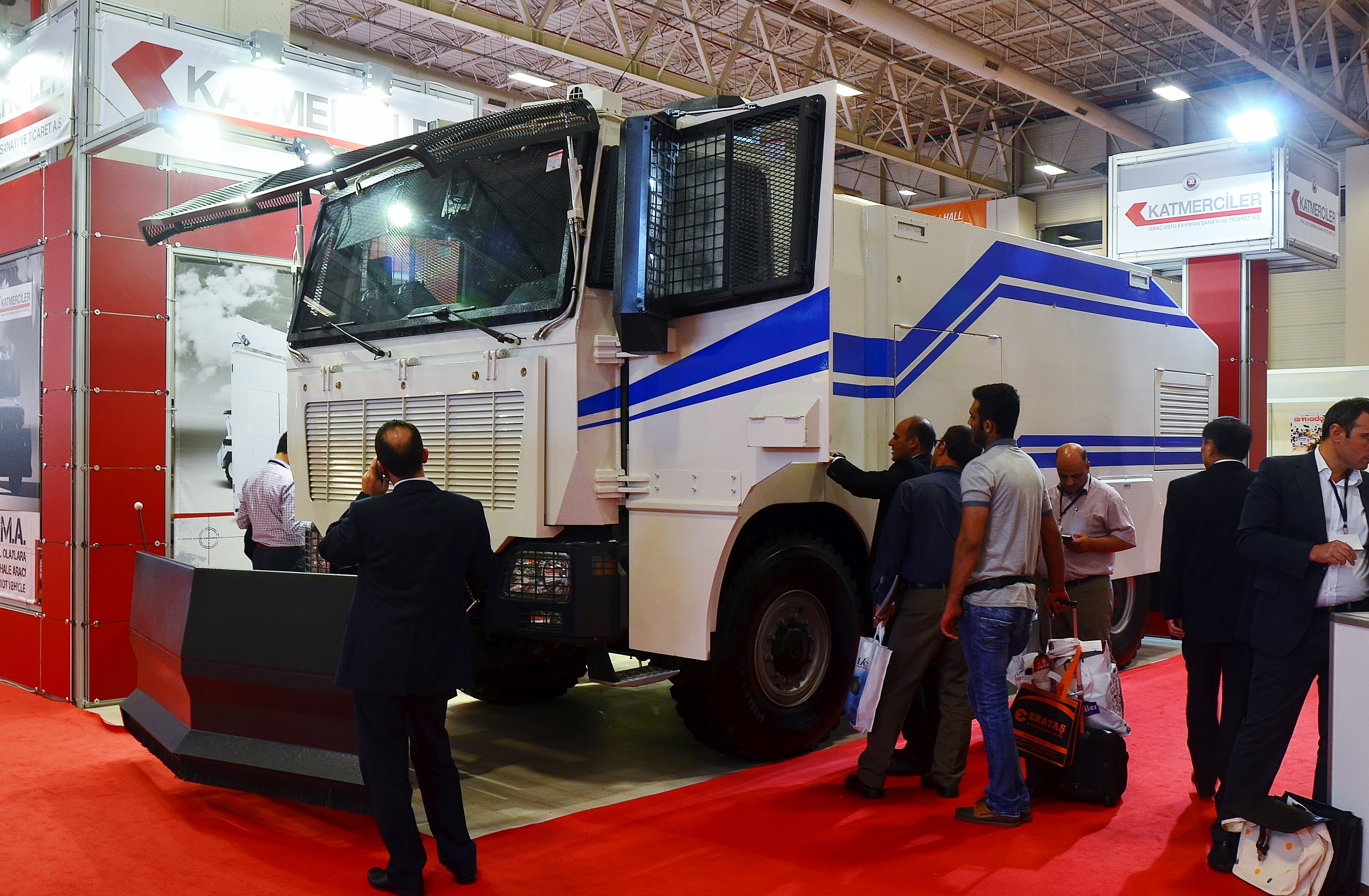
Riot control vehicle TOMA of Katmerciler at IDEF 2015

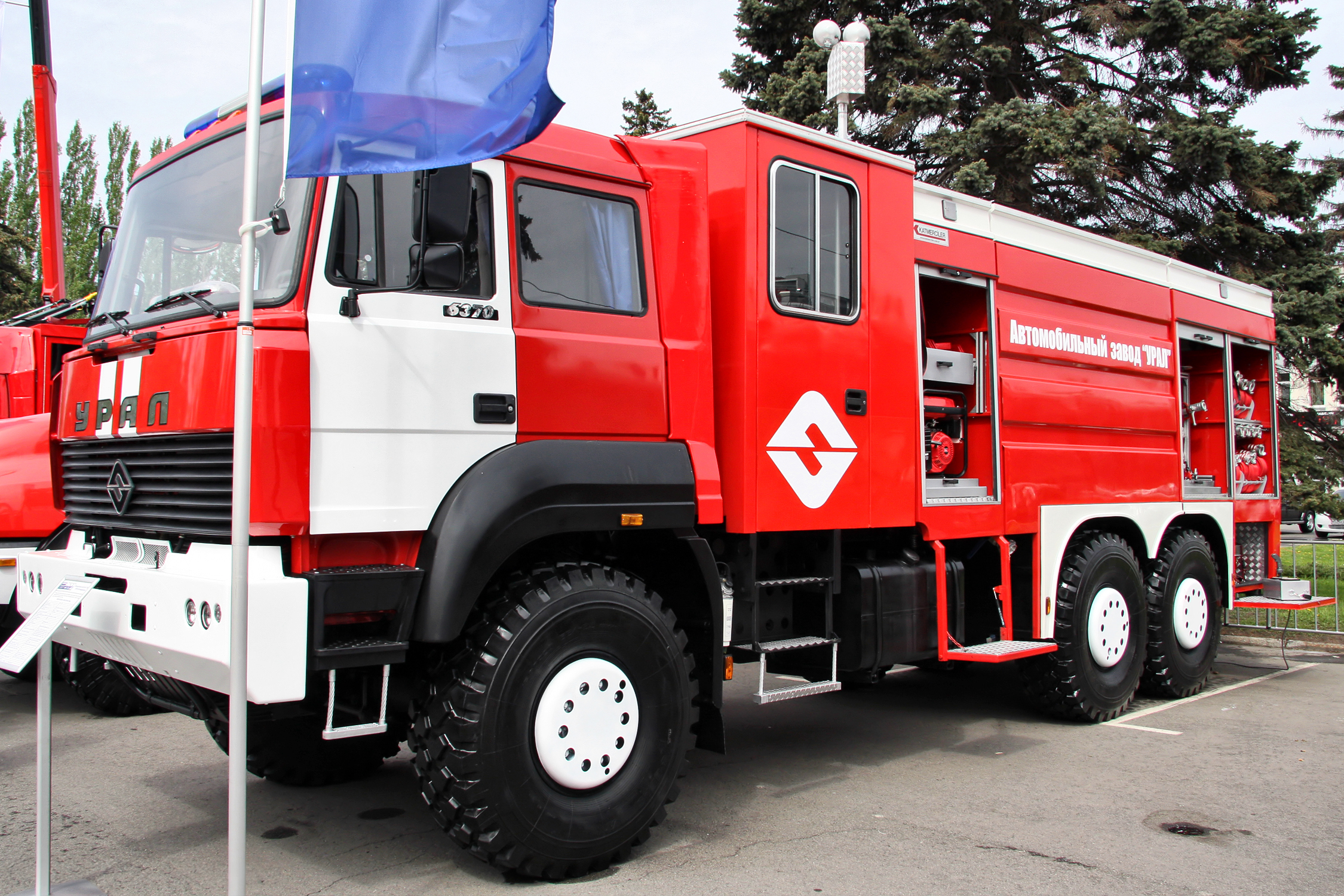
Fire fighting vehicle ATs-8,0-67 URAL-Katmerciler on URAL-63701 chassis

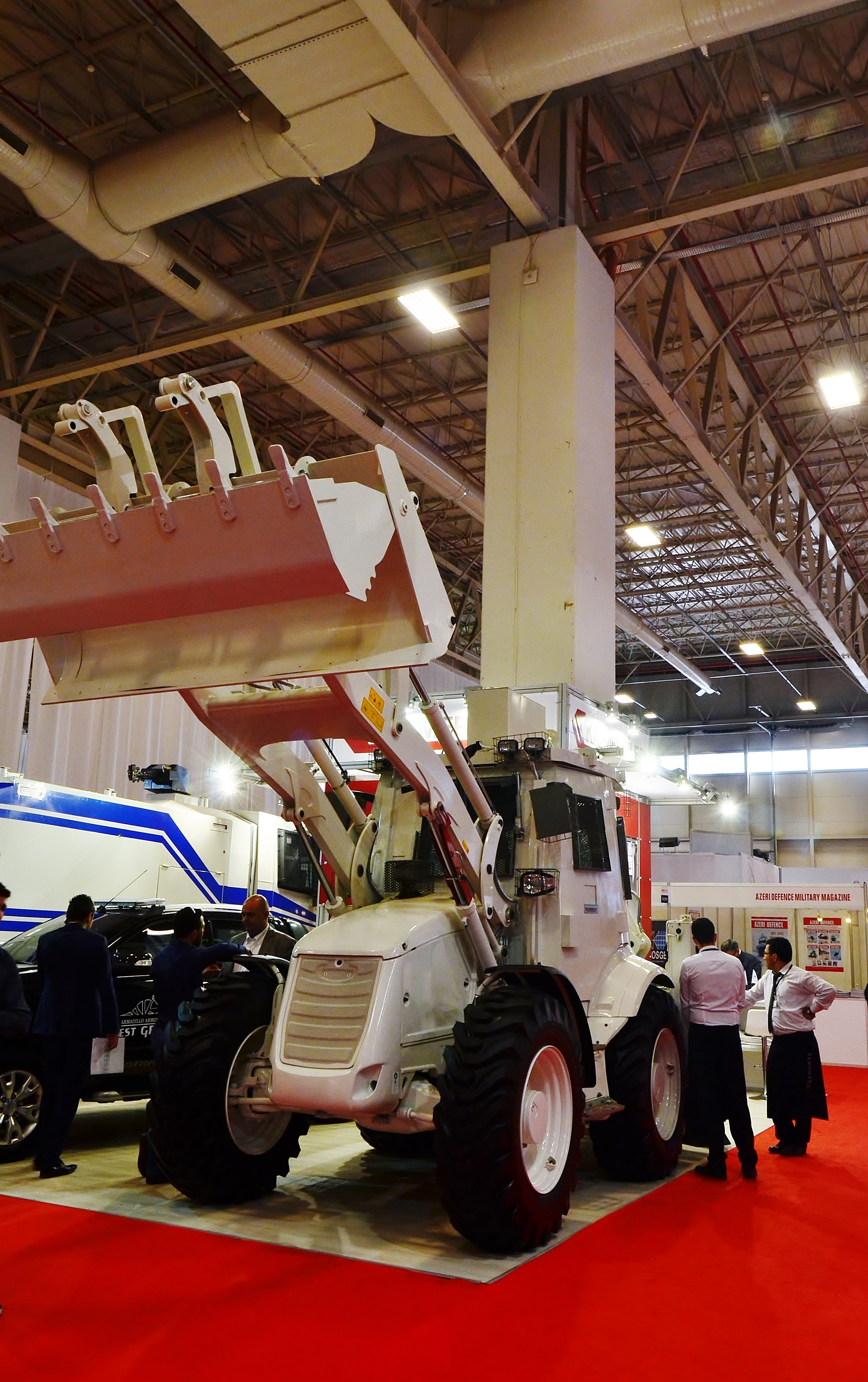
Katmerciler armored wheel loader

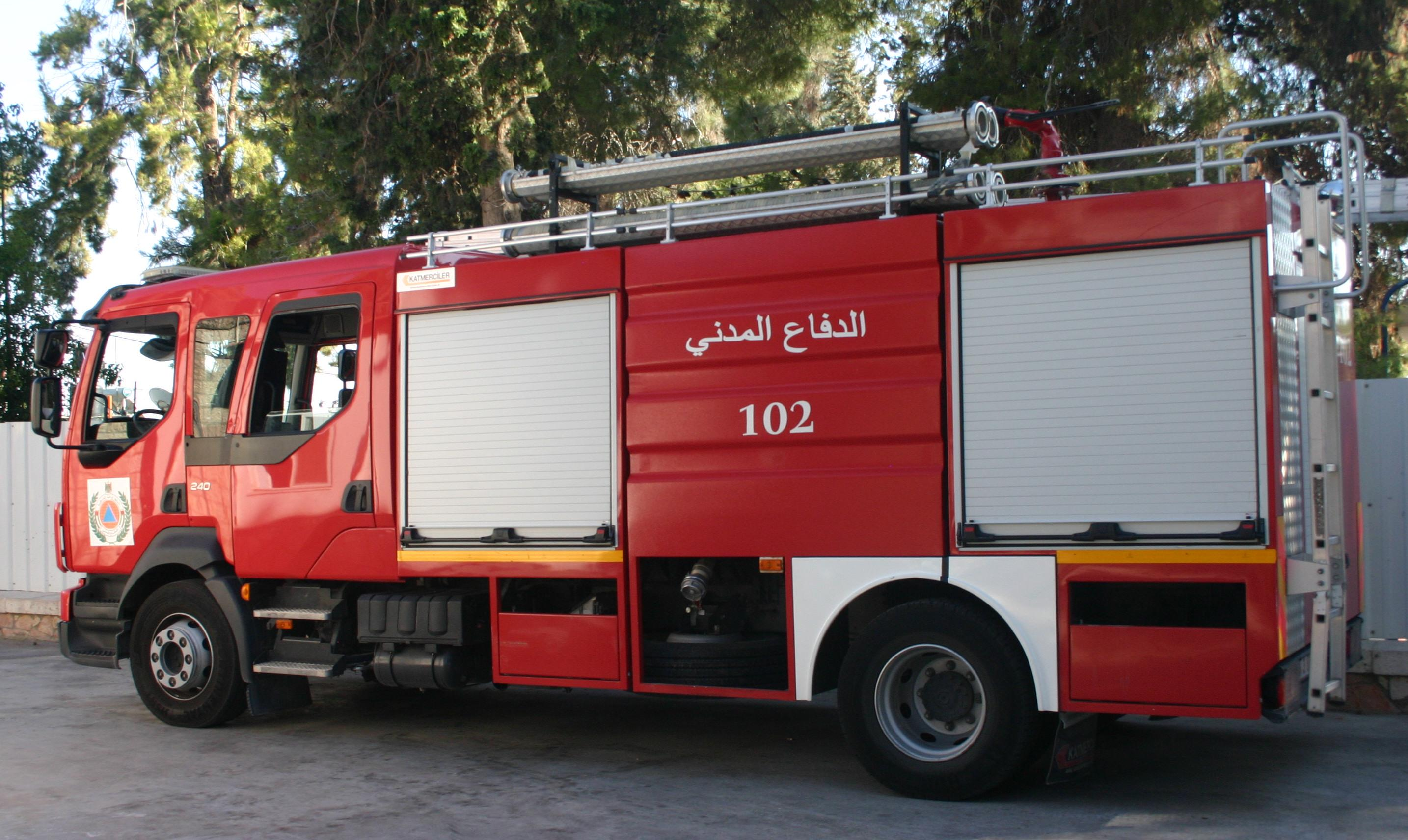
Katmerciler Firetruck on Volvo in the fire station in al-Bireh
