= İsmail Bilen =

Turkish politician

- Born: October 18, 1902; Rize, Ottoman Empire
- Died: November 18, 1983 (aged 81); East Berlin, East Germany
- Years active: 1918–1983

İsmail Bilen (October 18, 1902 in Çinçiva village, Vija, Ottoman Empire – November 18, 1983 in East Berlin, GDR) was a Turkish politician. He was elected as General Secretary of the Central Committee of the Communist Party of Turkey in 1974.

== Bibliography ==
Ismail Bilen (political pseudonym - Bostandzhi Marat) (1902–1983). A prominent leader of Turkish and World Communist movement. General Secretary of the Turkish Communist Party from 1974 to 1983.

1922 – Joined the Communist Party. 1927 – Elected as a member of Central Committee. 1927–1929 and 1933–1936 – Served as a member of the Political Bureau and Secretary of the Central Committee. 1937 and 1943 – Representative of the CPT in the ECCI (COMINTERN). 6 June 1974 – Elected as General Secretary of the Party's Central Committee. April 1983 – Chairman of the party.
