= Ethem Nejat =

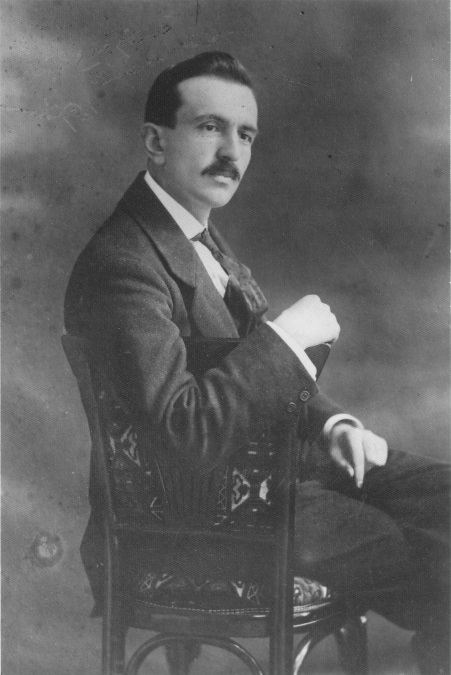

General secretary of Communist Party of Turkey
- In office 15 September 1920 – 29 January 1921
- Preceded by: Office established
- Succeeded by: Salih Hacıoğlu

Personal details
- Born: 1883 Trabzon, Ottoman Empire
- Died: 28 January 1921 (aged 37–38) Black Sea
- Occupation: Politician; revolutionary; educator

Ethem Nejat or Edhem Nejad (1883 – 28 January 1921) was a Turkish educator, revolutionary and left communist politician. Known for his contributions to the modernization of Turkish education system during his lifetime, he was one of the founders and first general secretary of Communist Party of Turkey. He was assassinated on the shores of the Black Sea together with Mustafa Suphi and 13 other TKP members.

== Biography ==
=== Family and Education ===
His father's name is Hasan, and his mother's name is Djavide. His maternal grandfather Ahmed Javid Pasha is among the Circassian Community of Union and Solidarity founders.

After taking high school education at Üsküdar High, he took his higher education in Trade Academy. He has been in United States and France before Second Constitutional Era.

=== Teaching Life ===
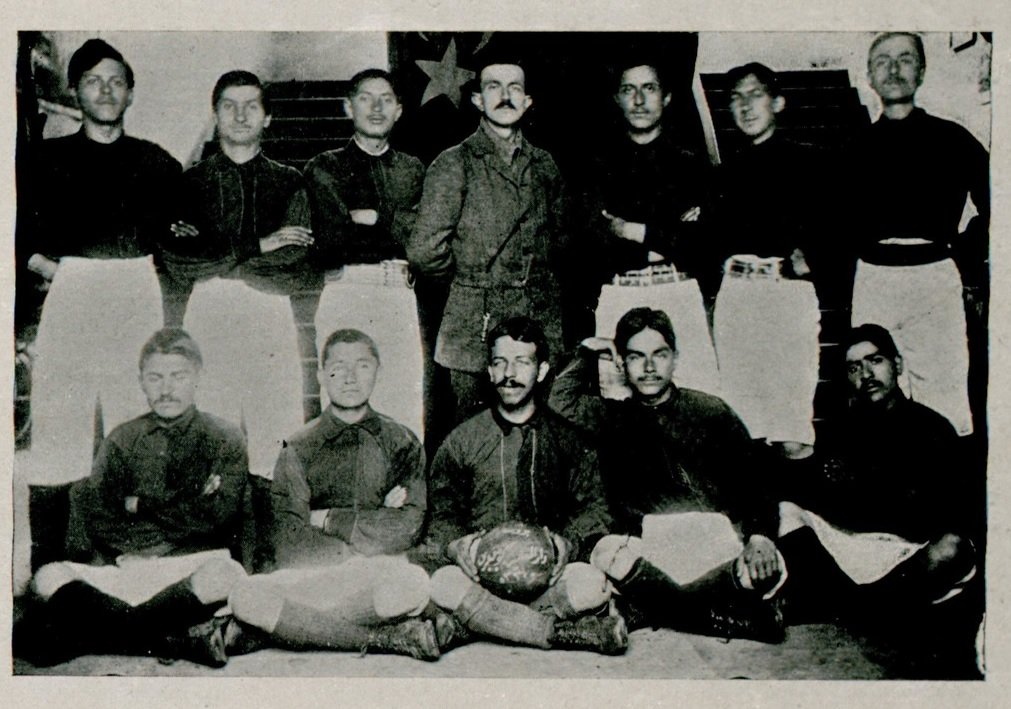
Ethem Nejat and school football team players.

Ethem Nejat was in France when the Second Constitutional Era was established. After the establishment, he returned to Istanbul and started working as a teacher. At this time, he was an author at Ottoman Agriculture and Trade Newspaper.

His first duty as a teacher started in Alasonya Administrative Directorate in 1909. After one year, he was appointed as school director at a teaching school. After the defeat of Ottoman Empire in Balkan Wars, he returned to Istanbul due to territorial losses. In 1913, he was respectively appointed to school directorate in various teacher schools in Bursa and İzmir. In the first days of World War I, he was on duty as Director of Education in Eskişehir. He also did voluntary military service for a while during that time. Being Director of Education in Adana and İzmir during the war, Ethem Nejat was appointed to Education Supervision in Istanbul in 1918 when the war was over.

=== Political life ===
Originally a Pan-Turkist, in 1918, the Ottoman government sent him to Germany, where he became a Communist and participated in the Spartacist German Revolution along with the "Workers and Peasants Party" he formed with Turkish students and workers who were in Germany. This group published the paper Liberation. They were recalled in 1919 back to Turkey, where they changed the party's name to the Turkish Workers and Peasants Socialist Party. Members of this party were eventually going to make the bulk of the Istanbul organization of the Communist Party of Turkey. Liberation was published in Turkey, and Ethem Nejat wrote articles about the proletariat, capital, and class struggle; the paper also had articles about the October Revolution.

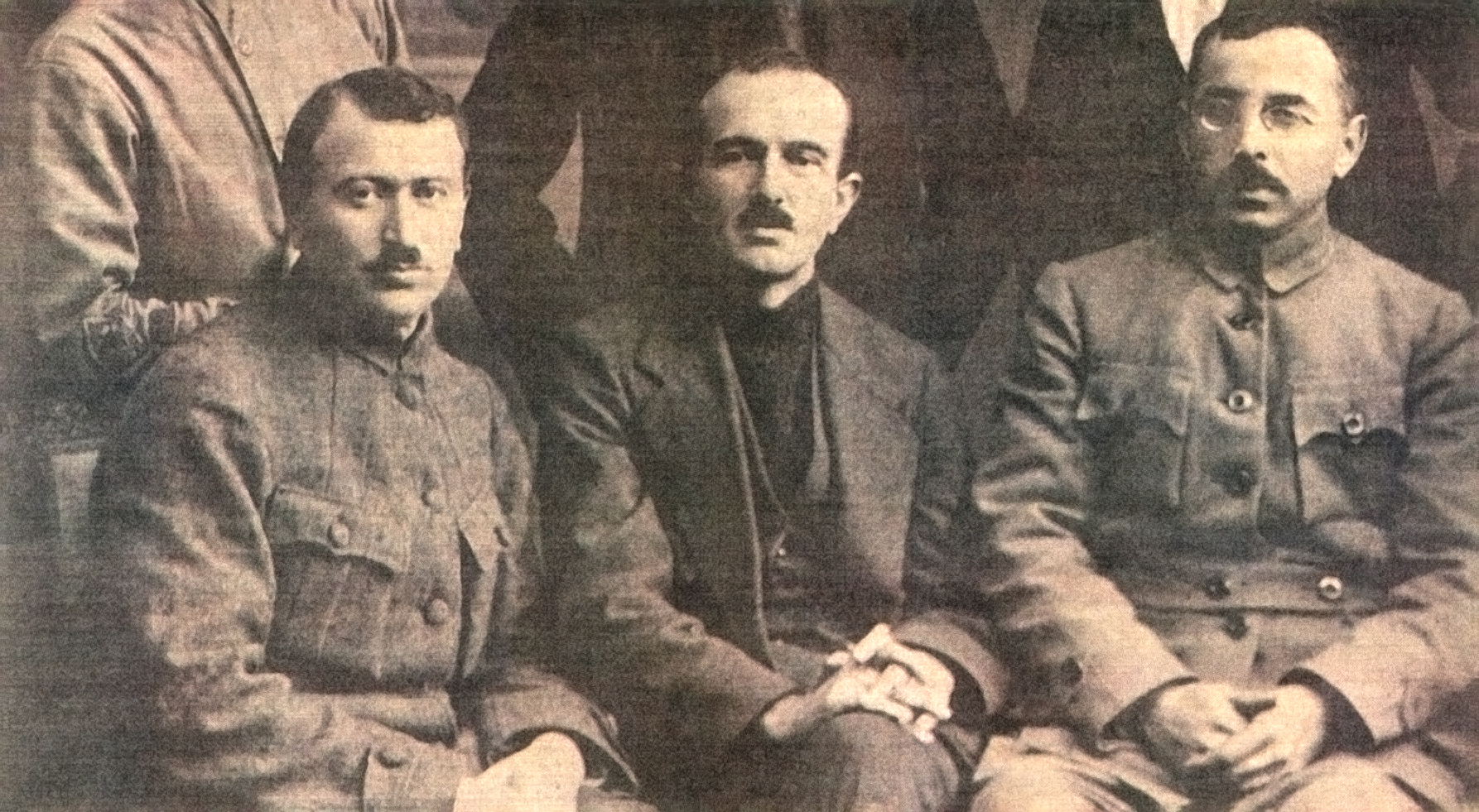
Founders of Communist Party of Turkey: Mustafa Suphi (right), Ethem Nejat (middle) and İsmail Hakkı (left)

The Turkish revolutionary Mustafa Suphi, exiled in Russia, was planning to get in touch with communist groups in Turkey and form the Communist Party of Turkey by uniting the different communist groups in the country. As Suphi was in Baku, Nejat took the initiative among communists within the nation. This enabled the first congress of the Communist Party of Turkey to be held on September 11, 1920, in Baku, at which Nejat made a speech on the "Workers Struggle in Istanbul". The Turkish Workers and Peasants Socialist Party constituted one of the three major factions of the new communist party. He was elected as the general secretary of the new party.

With the Communist Party, Nejat's supporters published the magazine Kurtuluş, which became the party's de facto legal press organ. After several months, the party leaders decided to return to Turkey to join the ongoing struggle. On their way to Ankara to meet Mustafa Kemal, they were attacked by the inhabitants of the cities they were passing. Finally, they decided to return to Baku by boat from Trabzon. Ethem Nejat and Mustafa Suphi were killed along with 13 comrades on 28 January by Captain Yahya.

== Works ==
=== Books ===
- Türklük Nedir ve Terbiye Yolları (What is Turkishness and Ways of Discipline) – 1913
- Çiftlik Müdürü (Farm Manager) – 1913
- Yiğit Türkler (The brave Turks) – 1913
- Terbiye-i İptidaiye Islahatı (The Reform of Education) – 1915
- Çocuklarımızı Nasıl Büyütmeliyiz (How We Should Raise Our Children) – 1916
