= Law enforcement in Turkey =

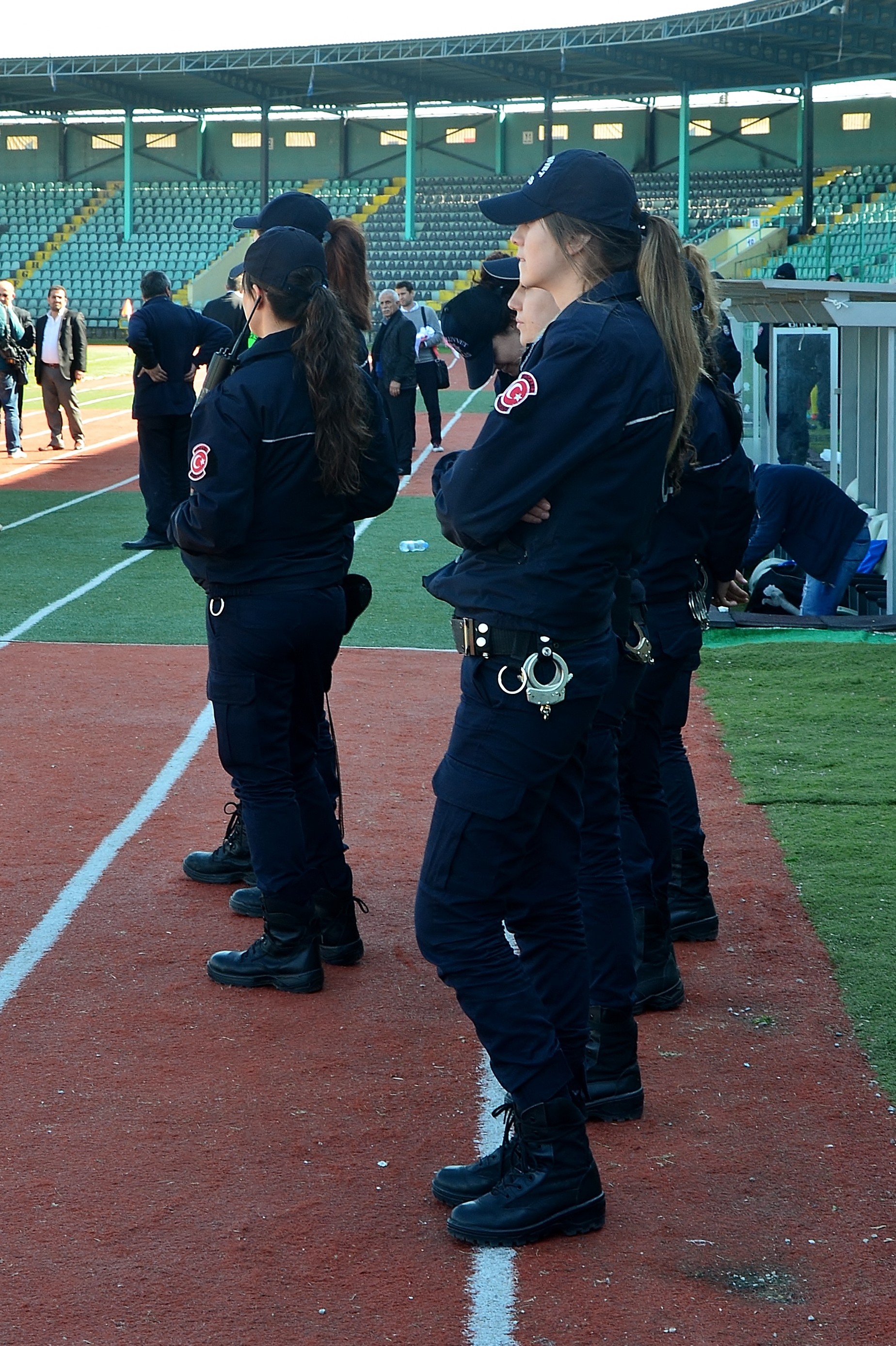
Female riot police squad (Çevik Kuvvet Polis) in Turkey.

Law enforcement in Turkey is carried out by several departments and agencies, all acting under the Ministry of Internal Affairs except military police which is under the command of the Turkish Armed Forces and the National Intelligence Organization which directly reports to the president.

== National agencies ==
=== General Directorate of Security ===
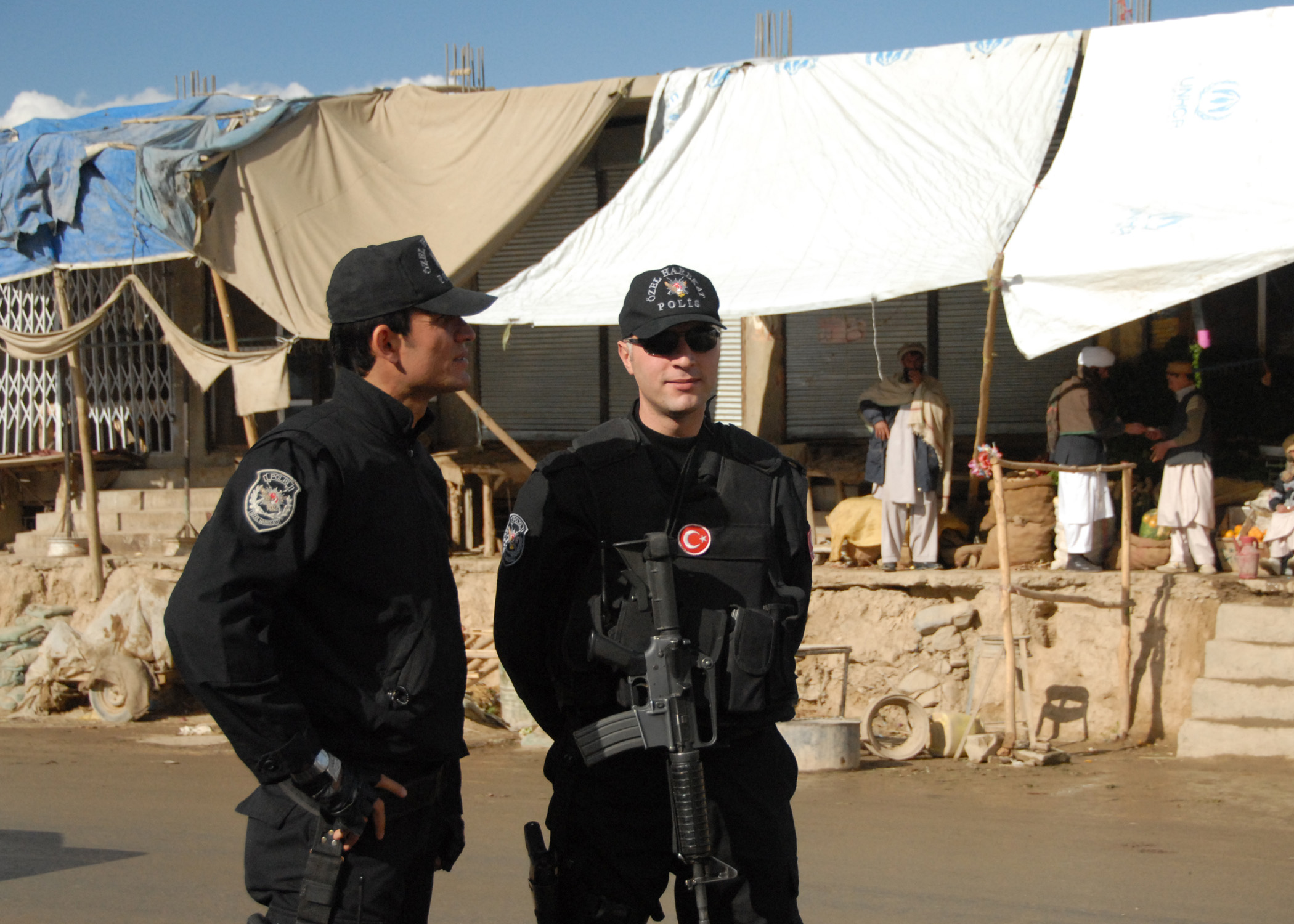
Turkish special forces police in Afghanistan. (2008)

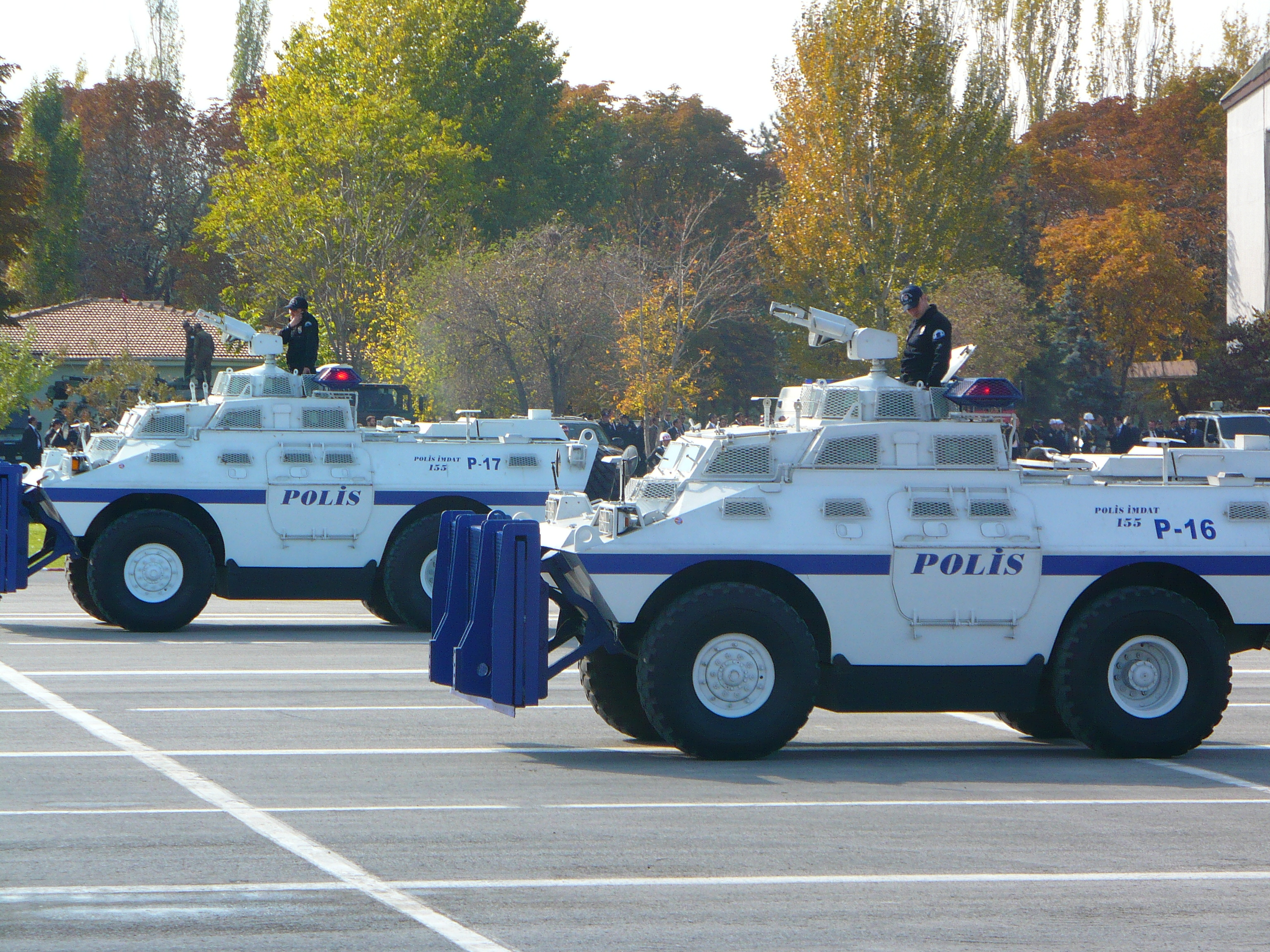
TOMA (vehicle) is used by Turkish Police

The General Directorate of Security (Turkish: Emniyet Genel Müdürlüğü) are the civilian police force and a service branch of the Turkish Ministry of Interior responsible for law enforcement in Turkey. The police force is responsible for law enforcement in cities and some exceptional locations, such as airports or border checkpoints, which are responsible for passport control and they protect with the help of the customs office (Turkish: Gümrük Muhafaza). Traffic Police ensure the safety of transportation and also work with registration of vehicles. Police also provides VIP security for president and other government officials. The Turkish Police also play a big part in important intelligence and counter-terrorist operations.

The police force is organised as follows:

- Central organisation
- Provincial organisation
  - 81 Province Directorate
  - 751 District Directorate affiliated to Province Directorate
  - 22 Border Gates Police Directorates
  - 18 Free-Zone police stations
  - 834 police stations in 81 Provinces

The organization has a centralized hierarchy similar to that of the Turkish Armed Forces. The high command of the Turkish Police, situated in Ankara, is called the General Directorate of Security (Turkish: Emniyet Genel Müdürlüğü). Every province has a Province Directorate (Turkish: İl Emiyet Müdürlüğü) and it operates under the command of province governors (Turkish: vali) and every district has District Directorate (Turkish: İlçe Emiyet Müdürlüğü / Amirliği) and it operates under the command of district governors (Turkish: kaymakam). Civil administrators (Turkish: mülki amir) are responsible for the security and well-being of towns and districts.

In Turkey, police officers wear navy-blue uniforms and caps. Patrol cars can be identified using the unique blue-white design and the writing "Polis", usually in capital letters, on the side doors and hood. Commissioners and chiefs wear silver stars on their shoulders, while directors wear golden stars.

=== Gendarmerie General Command ===
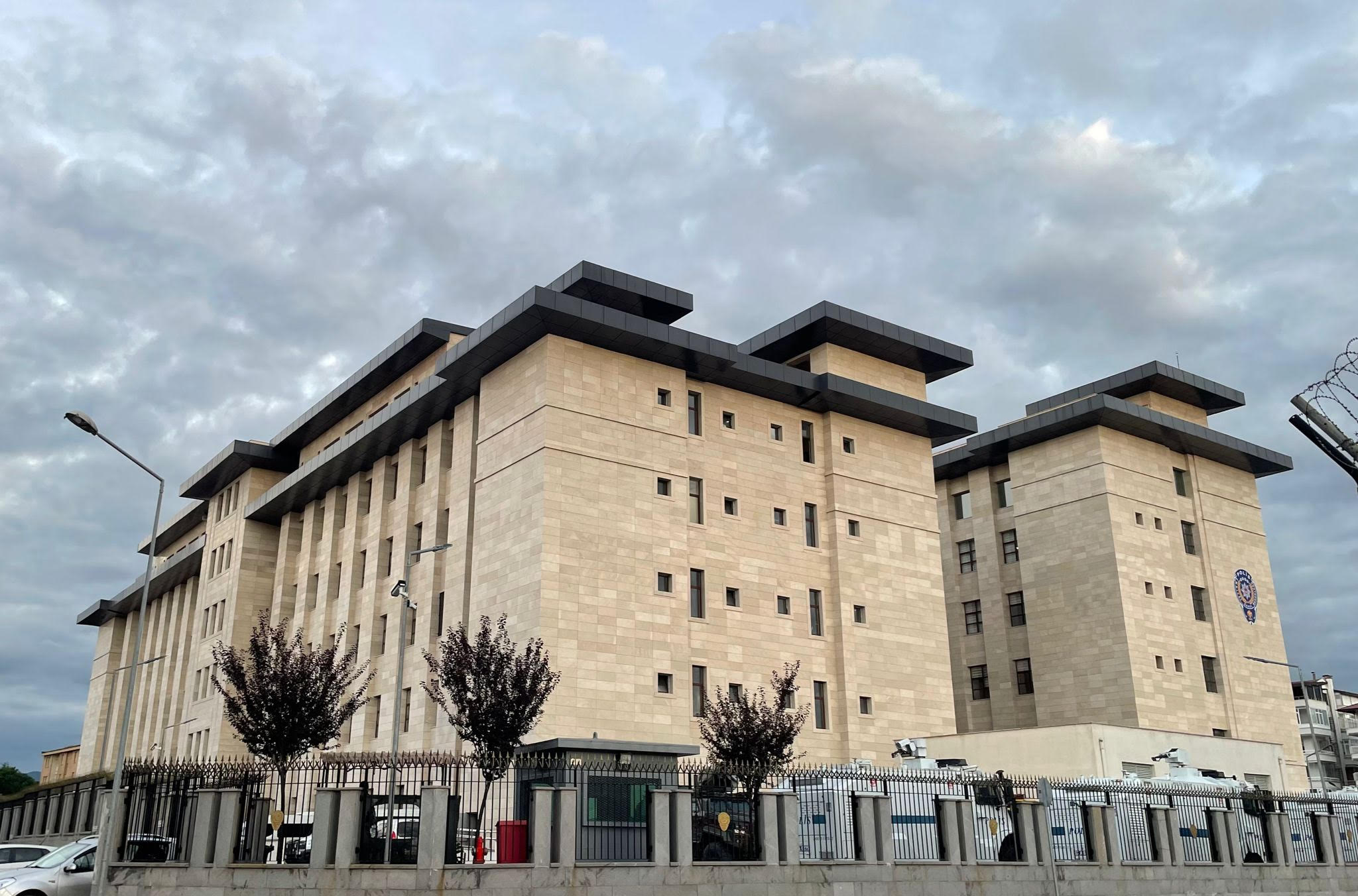
Ordu Provincial Police Headquarters

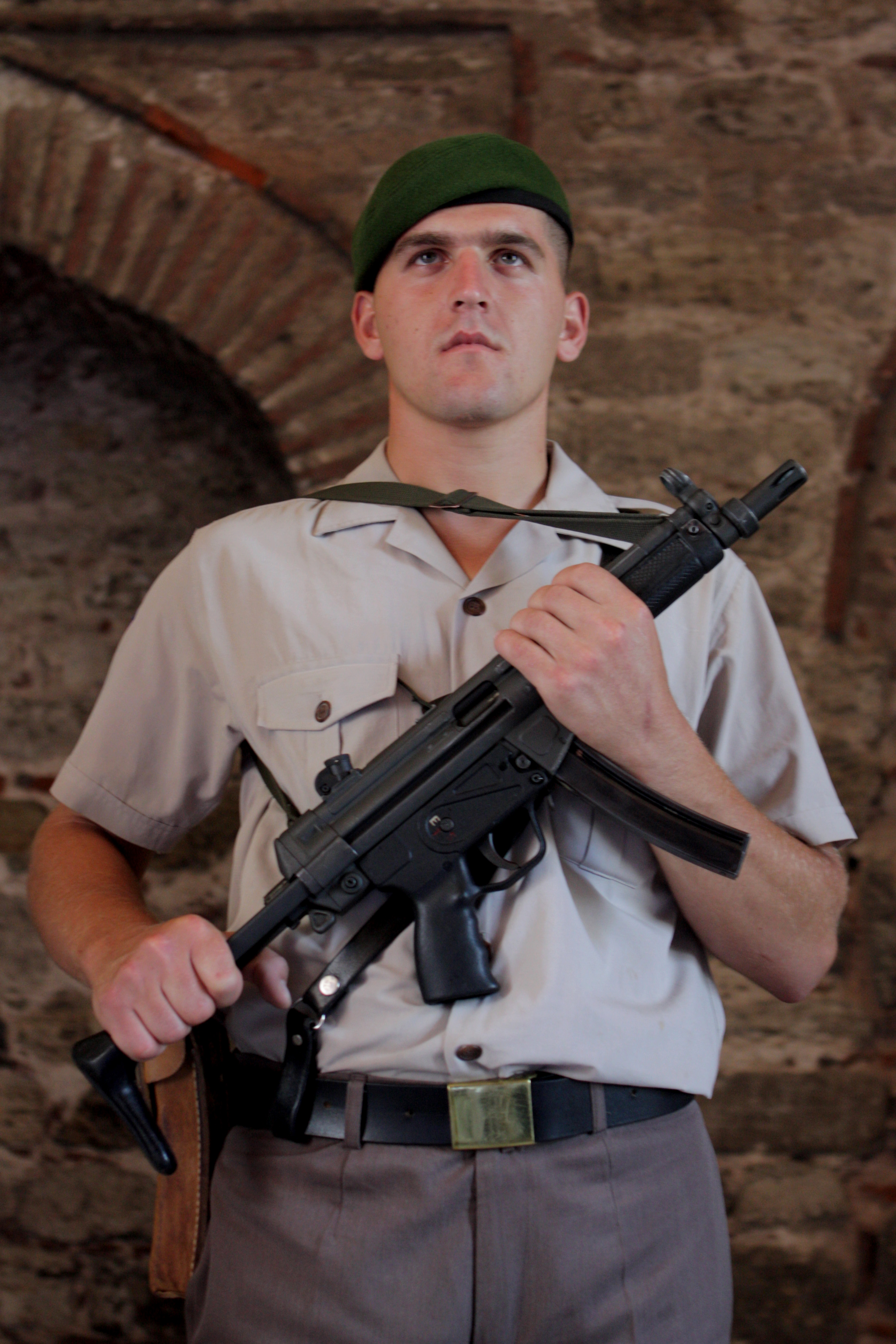
A Turkish conscript gendarme on guard at Topkapı Palace in Istanbul

The Gendarmerie General Command (Turkish: Jandarma Genel Komutanlığı) is the national Gendarmerie force of the Republic of Turkey. Their organization and duties are quite similar to those of the French Gendarmerie, or Italian Carabinieri. It is a service branch of the Turkish Ministry of Interior responsible for the maintenance of the public order in areas that fall outside the jurisdiction of police forces (generally in rural areas), as well as assuring internal security along with carrying out other specific duties assigned to it by certain laws and regulations. The Gendarmerie is also responsible for the outer security in the prisons and transportation of prisoners. In wartime, some of its elements can be subordinated to Turkish Land Forces by the President

The Commander of the Gendarmerie reports to the Minister of the Interior.

The Gendarmerie Command (Turkish: Jandarma Genel Komutanlığı) is based in Ankara.

Their area of jurisdiction is outside city centres, mostly in the country where population and population density are low and crime rates are especially high (this is even more true for the Southeastern Anatolia Region, where terrorist acts are committed every day in and outside of towns). Most tourist sites are also areas of Jandarma's jurisdiction because their average population throughout the year are not high enough to fall under the police departments.

Most of the counter-terrorism operations in the southeast of Turkey are being carried out by the Gendarmerie.

=== Coast Guard Command ===
The Coast Guard Command (Turkish: Sahil Güvenlik Komutanlığı) is the coast guard service of the Turkish Republic. The Turkish Coast Guard is under the command of the Ministry of the Interior. However, during wartime some of its elements can be subordinated to Turkish Naval Forces by the President.

The Coast Guard is responsible for controlling the maritime jurisdiction areas and coasts of Turkiye and fighting all kinds of illegal action in the responsibility area. Turkish Coast Guard is also the main Search and Rescue Coordination Authority in Turkish SAR Zone.

=== Military Police ===
The Askeri İnzibat military police is a small force that is under military command that handles cases directly relevant to military security and military crimes. Their area of jurisdiction is generally limited to military bases. Some of the other duties they perform are, protection and VIP detail provided to important bases or commanders and control of traffic inside the bases. They can be identified using the very obvious “AS. İZ.”, printed in large letters across the front of their helmets.

=== Intelligence ===
The Turkish Intelligence and counter-intelligence operations are conducted by more than one organization also acting with coordination.

The main intelligence agency is The National Intelligence Organization (Turkish: Milli İstihbarat Teşkilatı, or MİT) and conducts most of the domestic and foreign intelligence operations. The director of the National Intelligence Organization (Turkish: MİT Başkanı) reports directly to the president. Members of the National Intelligence Organization can't be, arrested by law enforcement agencies, interrogated by prosecutor or stand trial by courts without a permission from the president with matters regarding their duty.

Domestic intelligence is mostly collected by the Police and the Gendarmarie and each have a department that perform duties relevant to the collection and analysis of intelligence and countering criminal acts. Police Intelligence Department is the Police force's intelligence wing, second one is Gendarmerie Intelligence Department. Coast Guard Command is also has an intelligence department.

Also, each of the service branches of the Turkish Armed Forces has an intelligence branch within it. These are the Army Intelligence, Navy Intelligence and Air Force Intelligence. Superseding all three, the General Staff also has an intelligence branch which ensures the cooperation and coordination of these organizations.

== Local agencies ==
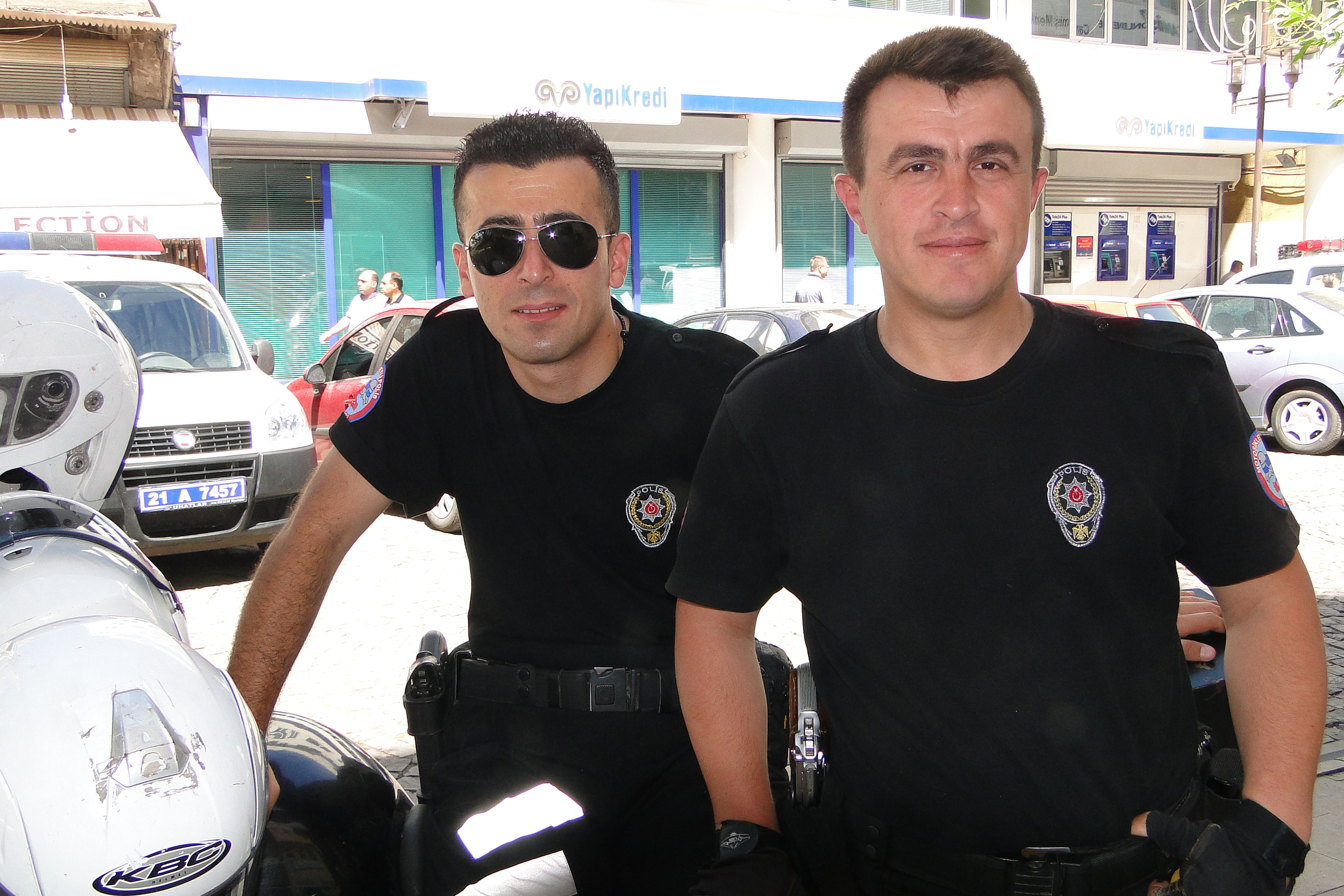
Police on duty in Turkey

=== Municipal Police ===
Municipal police (Turkish: Belediye zabıtası) is a law enforcement body responsible for ensuring the implementation and control of municipal services in different municipalities in Turkey. The police officers also use their powers as traffic police in metropolitan municipalities. Other than that it does not have any policing powers nor any weaponry.

=== Village Guards ===
Village guards (Turkish: Köy Koruyucusu) are mostly locals in villages of the Eastern Anatolia Region. They perform auxiliary and voluntary law enforcement duty and under the command of the Gendarmerie. Established by a 1985 law, their main purpose is to defend villages against attacks from the PKK.

== As a guest police force in Germany ==
In light of growing crime and racial tensions in many Turkish-populated areas of Germany, the German government implemented a plan in 2010 for the Turkish law enforcement to patrol areas affected and to participate in maintaining law and order. The plan was met with criticism, but was implemented in the belief that local law enforcement has difficulty dealing with members of the Turkish community.

== Historical secret police organizations ==
- Special Organization
- JİTEM

== Issues ==
- Police brutality in Turkey, including Torture in Turkey
- Human rights in Turkey

== See also ==
- Crime in Turkey
- Prisons in Turkey
- JÖAK
- Jandarma Özel Harekat
- Polis Özel Harekat
- Çevik Kuvvet
- Municipal police (Turkey)
