= Mustafa Subhi =

Turkish revolutionary

Mustafa Suphi
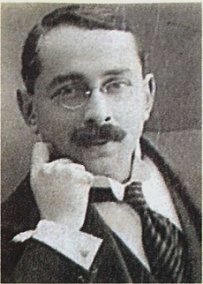
- Born: 1883; Giresun Province, Ottoman Empire
- Died: 28 January 1921 (aged 37–38); Black Sea
- Known for: Founding the Communist Party of Turkey

Mustafa Suphi or Mustafa Subhi (1883 – 28 January 1921) was a Turkish revolutionary and communist during the period of dissolution of the Ottoman Empire.

== Early life ==
Suphi was born in 1883 in Giresun Province, in the Ottoman Empire, now located in Turkey. He was educated in Jerusalem, Damascus and Erzurum before he attended Galatasaray High School. He studied political science in Paris, where he was also a correspondent of the Turkish newspaper Tanin. He returned to Turkey in 1910, where he edited the newspaper Ifham. He also gave lectures on law and economics. In 1913 he was accused of involvement in the assassination of Mahmud Şevket Pasha and sentenced to fifteen years of exile in Sinop. There, he contributed articles about western philosophy to the periodicals Ictiha and Hak. However, in 1914 he escaped from Sinop and fled to Russia, where, following the outbreak of the First World War, Russian authorities regarded him as a prisoner of war and sent him into exile in the Ural region.

== Communist activism ==
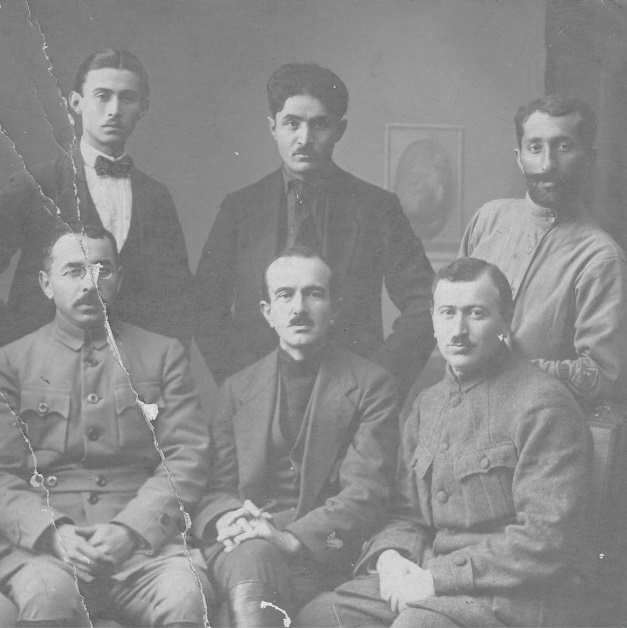
Communist Party of Turkey founder Mustafa Suphi (left), general secretary Ethem Nejat (middle) and İsmail Hakkı (right) (bottom row)

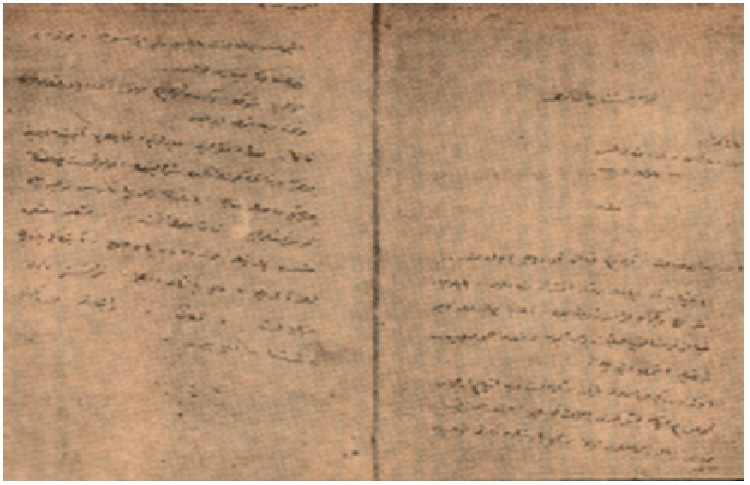
Manifesto of the Communist Party, translated to Turkish by Mustafa Suphi in 1919 (unfinished)

In 1915, he was in the Urals, where he joined the Bolshevik Party. In July 1918, he helped organise the Congress of the Turkish Left Socialists, held in Moscow, and in November, he became involved in Muskom. He was also elected to the Central Committee of the All Russia Muslim Workers section of Narkomnats. He acted as Mirsäyet Soltanğäliev's secretary. In 1918 he founded Yeni Dünya (New World) in Moscow and used it to popularise the foundations of scientific socialism to Turkish prisoners-of-war. He was chairperson of the Turkish Section of Eastern Publicity Bureau, and in 1919 attended the First Congress of the Third International as the delegate for Turkey.

At the First Congress of Communist Party of Turkey, held in Baku on 10 September 1920, Suphi was elected its chairman and went to Anatolia. He was one of the 15 communists who went to Turkey to join the Turkish War of Independence. After encountering hostility in Erzurum, the communists tried to return to Baku. However, they were murdered by Sailor Yahya after they had set sail from Trabzon on the night of 28 January 1921. He was possibly murdered by a group of supporters of Enver Pasha from Trabzon, apparently because of the fear that Suphi might expose Enver Pasha's plans of political activities in Moscow and his ultimate intention of using the Bolsheviks to regain power in Turkey once the Turkish National Movement were defeated.

There is need to provide army service area in order to establish links between the partisan troops in various locations of Anatolia and there is need to establish Military-Revolution Committee so as to strengthen this movement. This organization is going to be independent; but our organization will guide it. All the mission of Military-Revolution Committee of Turkey will concentrate on the direction of progression and preservation of the movement of social revolution both in Soviet Russia and worldwide. It will prove useful for Anatolian movement against English – French occupiers, for the spread of this movement throughout the Caucasus and for the organization of Soviet power in those places. Military-Revolution Committee of Turkey taking control of all the duties in Anatolia by means of making use of the first opportunity, will build Socialist Turkey and run towards the aim of joining hands with neighbour Soviet Russia. (M. Suphi; Moscow, 28 October 1919)

== Death ==
Suphi was killed by Sailor Yahya together with his communist comrades while traveling to Batumi in the Black Sea on 28 January 1921. It is not entirely clear who arranged the killing, whether the emerging central government in Ankara or old Unionists (Enver Pasha supporters).

== See also ==
- List of assassinated people from Turkey

== Sources ==
- Biography at Marxists Internet Archive
