= Communist Workers Party of Turkey =

Communist Workers Party of Turkey Türkiye Komünist İşçi Partisi
- Founded: November 1998
- Headquarters: None (Illegal Organisation)
- Ideology: Communism; Marxism–Leninism; Anti-revisionism
- Political position: Far-left

Website
- www.tkip.org

Communist Workers Party of Turkey (Turkish: Türkiye Komünist İşçi Partisi) is an illegal Marxist-Leninist party in Turkey. TKİP was founded in November 1998 by EKİM (October), a group that had split away from the Revolutionary Communist Party of Turkey (TDKP) in 1988. Initially EKİM had been known as Revolutionary Communist Party of Turkey-Leninist Wing (Türkiye Devrimci Komünist Partisi-Leninist Kanat).

In February 1999, TKİP suffered a split, and the Revolutionary People's Movement (DHH) was formed.

TKİP prisoners in Turkish prisons took part in the death fasts in 2000.

TKİP publishes Ekim (October), Kızıl Bayrak (Red Flag), Ekim Gençliği (October Youth) and Kamu Emekçileri Bülteni (workers' bulletin).

== See also ==
- List of illegal political parties in Turkey
