= Communist Party of Turkey =

Communist Party of Turkey or Turkish Communist Party may refer to:

- Communist Party (Turkey, 2014), 2014–2017
- Communist Party of Turkey (modern), founded as the Socialist Power Party in 1993
- Communist Party of Turkey (historical), 1920–1988
- Communist Party of Turkey (Workers Voice), 1978–present
- Communist Party of Turkey/Marxist–Leninist, 1972–present
- Communist Party of Turkey/Marxist–Leninist (Maoist Party Centre), a clandestine political party founded in 1987
- Communist Party of Turkey/Marxist–Leninist (New Build-Up Organization), a clandestine political party, 1978–1994 when it merged into the Marxist–Leninist Communist Party (Turkey)
- Communist Party of Turkey/Marxist–Leninist – Hareketi, a clandestine political party, 1976–1994 when it merged into the Marxist–Leninist Communist Party (Turkey)
- Communist Party of Turkey – Revolutionary Wing, 1980
- Communist Labour Party of Turkey, 1980
- Marxist–Leninist Communist Party (Turkey), 1994
- People's Communist Party of Turkey, 2014–2017
- Socialist Liberation Party or Communist Party of Turkey 1920, 2012–present
- Turkish Communist Party (official), 1920
- United Communist Party of Turkey, 1988–1991

== See also ==
- List of illegal political parties in Turkey
