= TOMA (vehicle) =

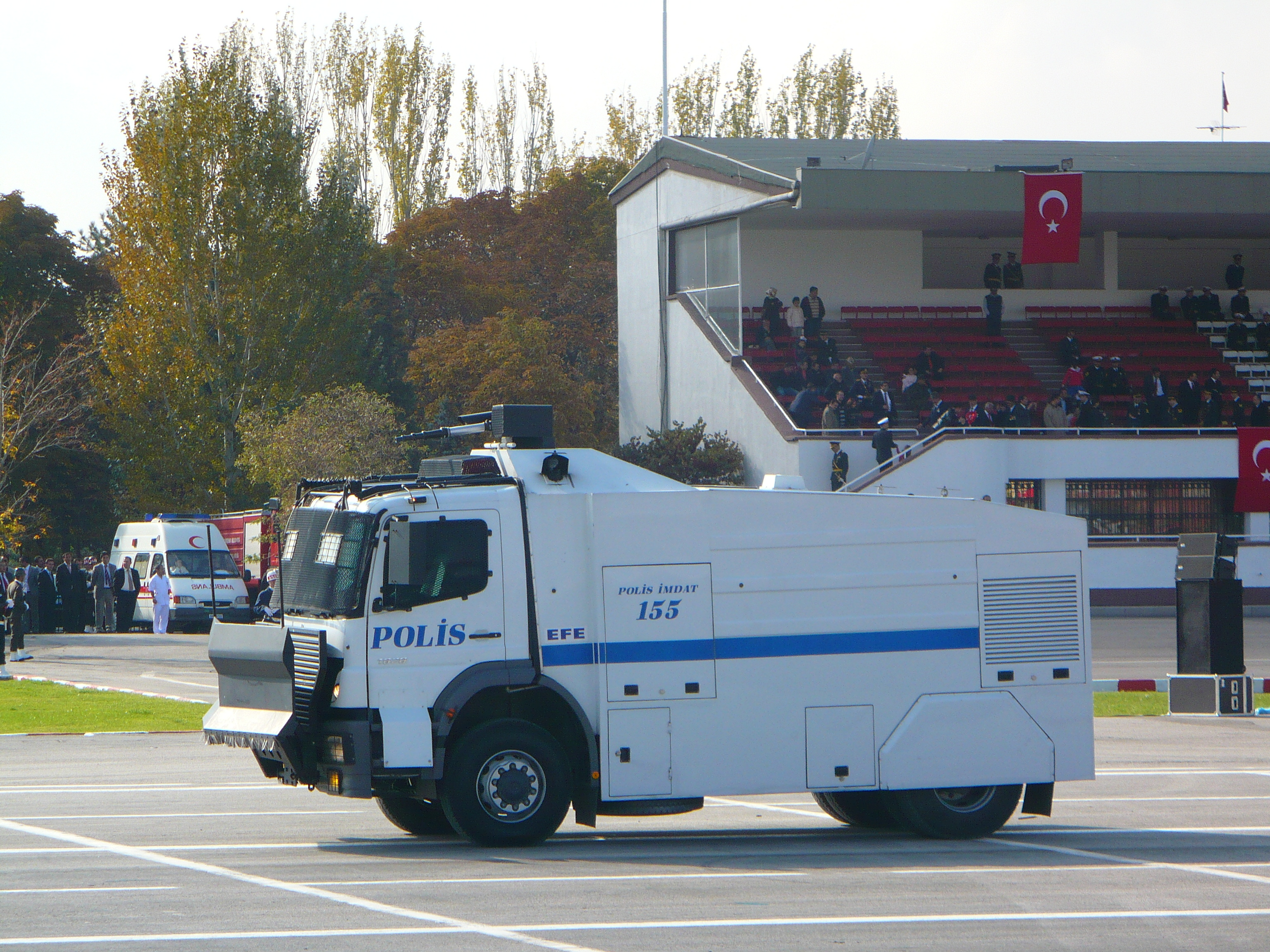
- A 'Smart Panzer' TOMA built by Moğol Makina on a Mercedes-Benz truck chassis
- Type: Water cannon
- Place of origin: Turkey

Production history
- Manufacturer: Otokar, BMC Otomotiv, Katmerciler, Moğol Makina, Nurol Makina

Specifications
- Mass: 5 t (4.9 long tons; 5.5 short tons)
- Length: 7.45 m (24 ft 5 in)
- Width: 2.5 m (8 ft 2 in)
- Height: 3.6 m (11 ft 10 in)
- Main armament: Water cannon
- Secondary armament: Side and rear gas sprays

The TOMA (Turkish: Toplumsal Olaylara Müdahale Aracı, lit. 'Intervention Vehicle Against Social Incidents') is an armored water cannon designed for riot control by Turkish companies Otokar, BMC, Katmerciler, Moğol Makina and Nurol Makina.

TOMAs are primarily operated by the Turkish National Police and the Turkish Gendarmerie. Following the Gezi Park protests, the Turkish government ordered a total of 73 TOMAs between 2013 and 2014, deploying them to Istanbul, Ankara and southeast Turkey. Following their use by Turkish police in crackdowns on protests in Gezi Park, the TOMA received new export orders to countries such as Brazil, Chile, Kuwait, Libya and Senegal. Sarajevo Canton Police are equipped with a Nurol Makina TOMA vehicle on a MAN chassis.

== Technical specifications ==
TOMAs can be built onto a range of Mercedes-Benz and Iveco truck chassis configurations, and can reach a top speed of 100 km/h. The heavy armor protects the cab, engine and weapons systems of the TOMA from rioters and gunfire, while also allowing it to achieve a 30% gradient climbing capability. Fire extinguishers are provided to put out fires in both the road and the vehicle, and the crew are protected against tear gas and other irritants breaching the cab.

The TOMA is primarily equipped with a computer-controlled water cannon system, firing pressurised water from two nozzles, with a water tank capacity of up to 10,000 litres (2,600 US gal) that can be filled with water from wells and lakes. The TOMA is also equipped with two 60 litres (16 US gal) tanks for tear gas and dye, as well as an 80 litres (21 US gal) foam tank. The foam, tear gas and dye reserves can be fired individually from the nozzles, or can be used in combination with water.

While TOMAs are primarily specified for riot control, they have also been used to water tree saplings planted as a memorial to fallen police officers, clean CBRN equipment, and fight large fires.

== Gallery ==
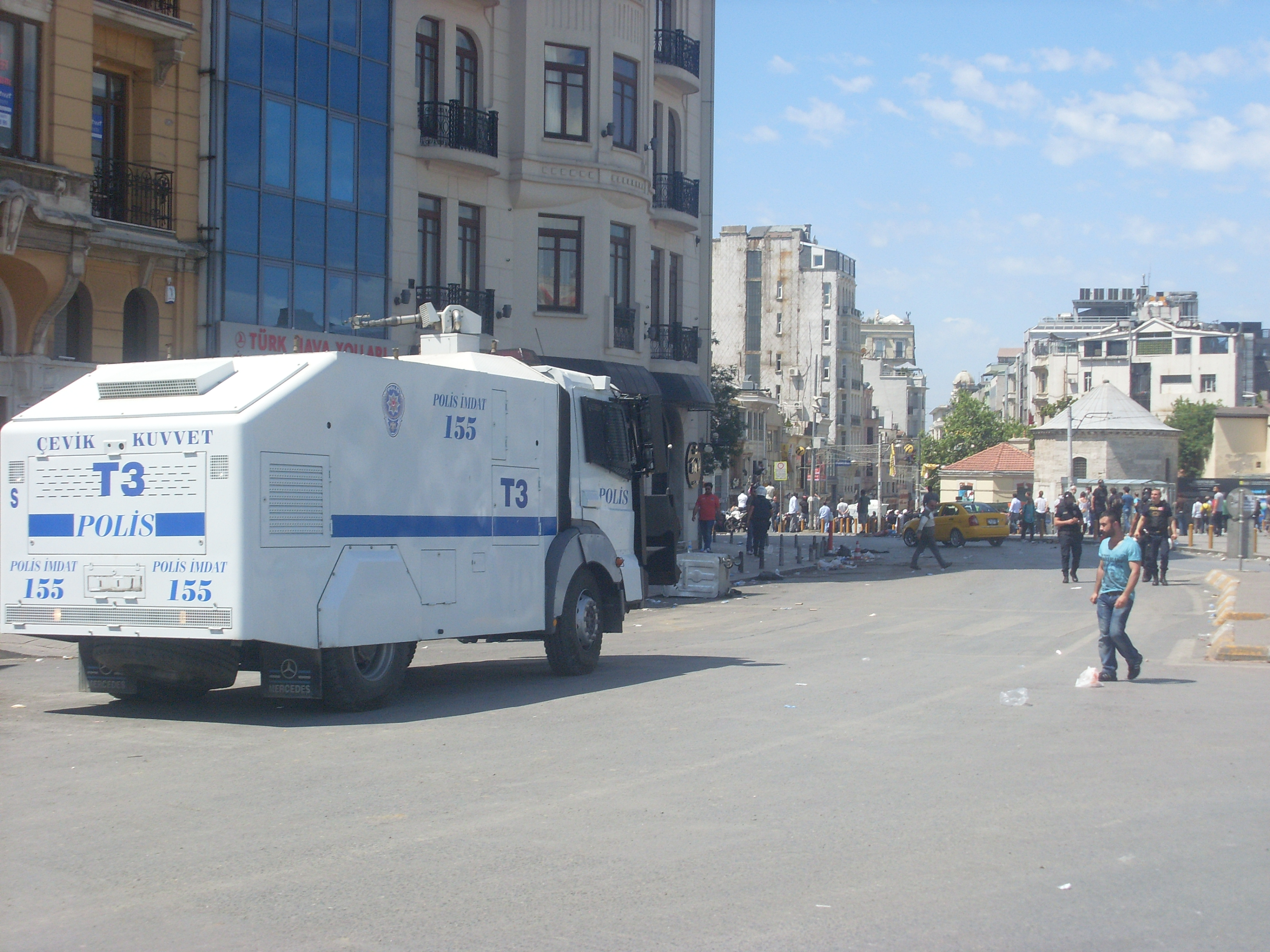
TOMA in Taksim Square, Istanbul

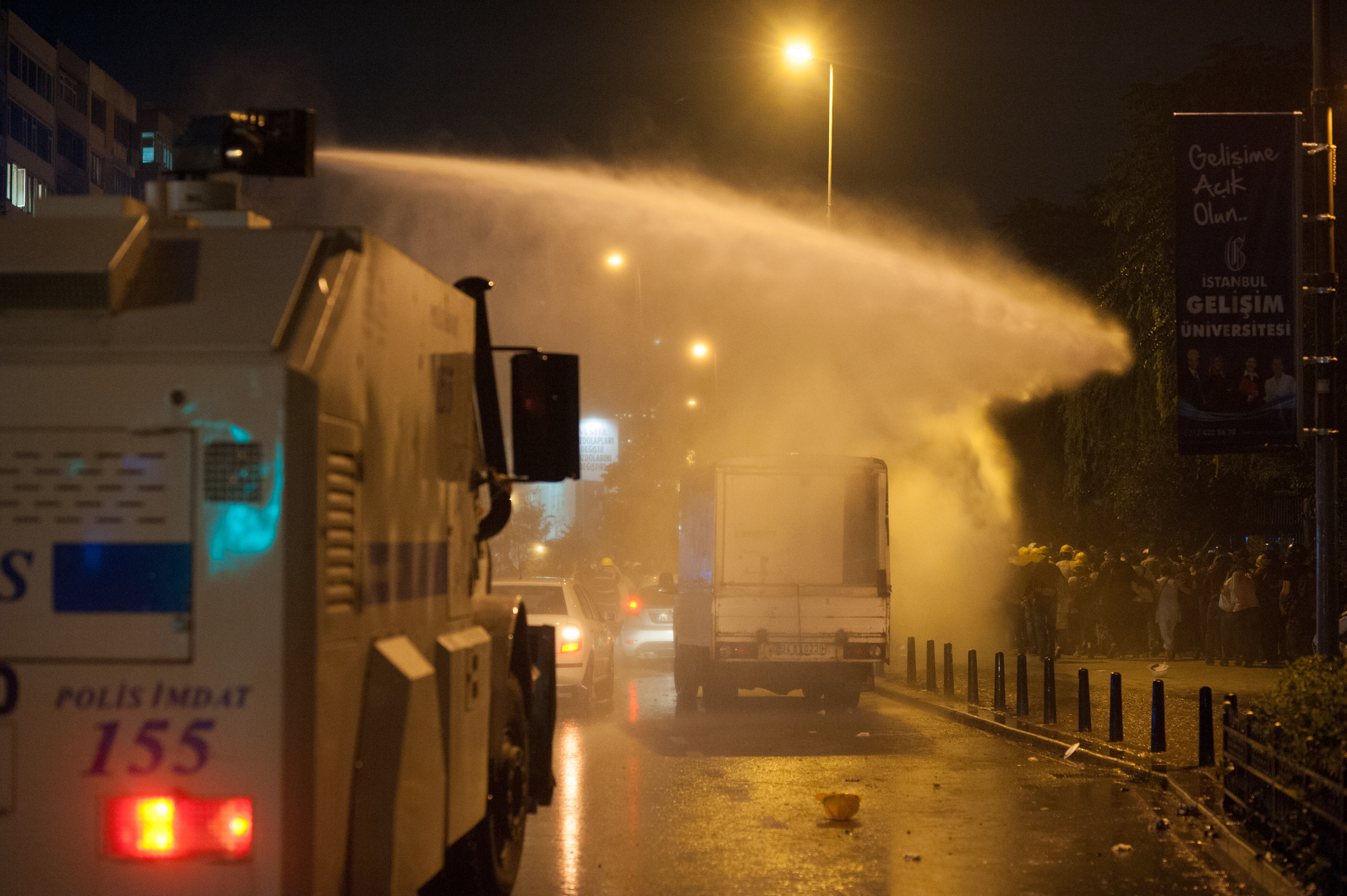
TOMA in action during the Gezi Park protests

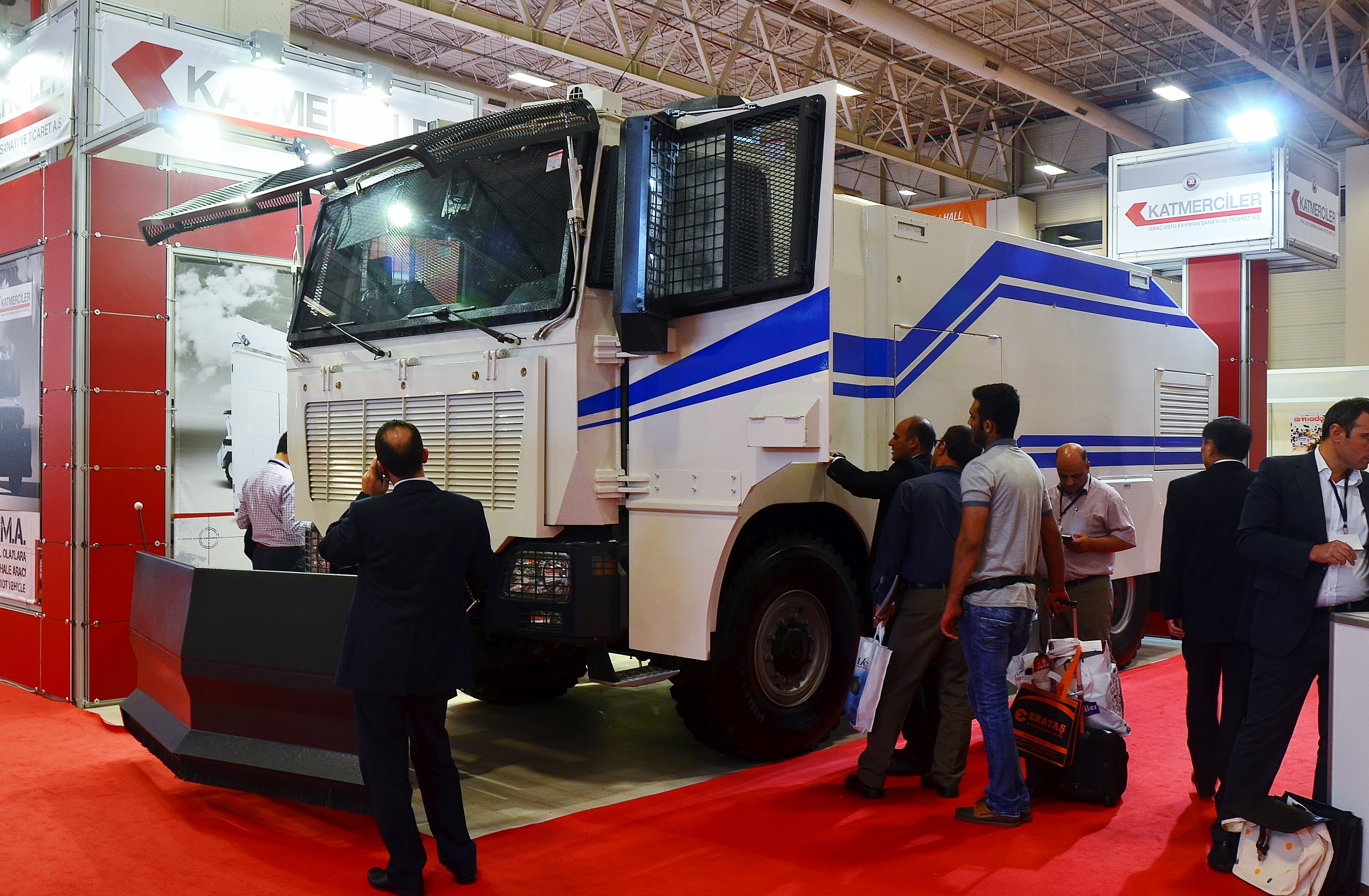
TOMA built by Katmerciler at IDEF 2015

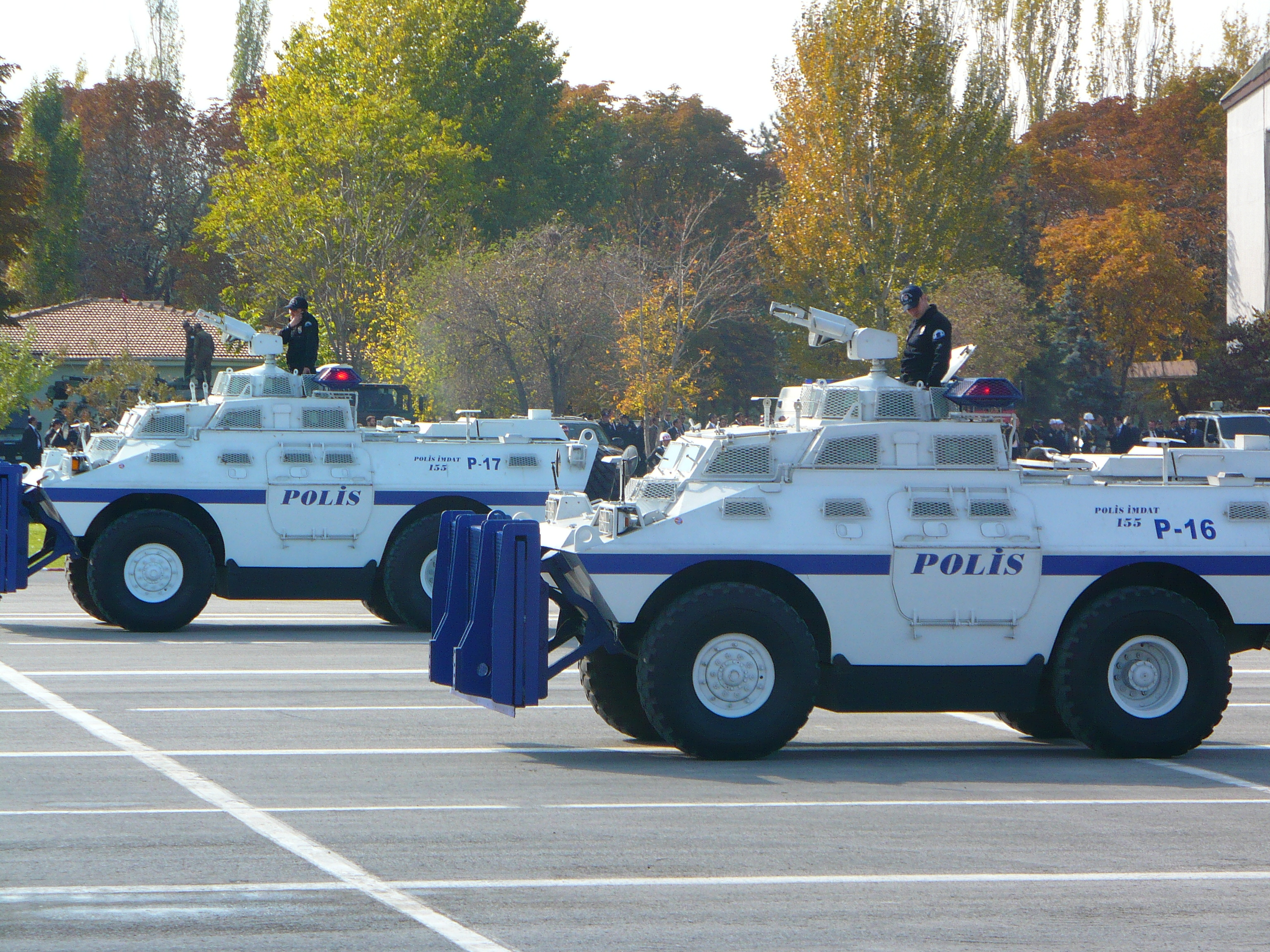
Dragoon 300 in General Directorate of Security (Turkey) inventory modernized by Nurol Machine as TOMA vehicle's (armored water cannon designed for riot control)

== See also ==
- Wasserwerfer 9000 and Wasserwerfer 10000 - the TOMA's German equivalent
