= List of illegal political parties in Turkey =

Illegal political parties in Turkey lists those organisations founded in or carried out activities mainly targeted to Turkey that (a) consider themselves to be political parties as indicated in their self-assigned names, (b) are not or cannot be established under the laws of Republic of Turkey.

Some of these organisations have carried out terrorist activities and hence can also be classified as terrorist organisations. Indeed, Turkish public authorities prefer either that denomination or that of illegal organisations (yasadışı örgütler in Turkish). However the term illegal political party (yasadışı siyasal parti or yasadışı siyasi parti in Turkish) is also used in official documents.

== Active illegal parties ==
According to Counter-Terrorism and Operations Department of Directorate General for Security (Turkish police) there are 13 active terrorist organisations in Turkey 11 of which are illegal political parties:

- Communist Workers Party of Turkey (TKİP)
- Devrimci Halk Kurtuluş Partisi/Cephesi (DHKP/C) (Revolutionary People's Liberation Party-Front)
- Maoist Komünist Partisi (MKP) (Maoist Communist Party)
- TKP/ML - KONFERANS (Communist Party of Turkey/Marxist–Leninist)
- Marxsist Leninist Komünist Parti (MLKP) (Marxist Leninist Communist Party)
- Türkiye Devrimci Komünist Partisi (Revolutionary Communist Party of Turkey)
- PKK/KONGRA-GEL (Kurdistan Workers Party)
- Kürdistan Devrim Partisi (PŞK) (Revolutionary Party of Kurdistan)
- Kürdistan Demokrat Partisi/Bakur (PDK/Bakur) (Democrat Party of Kurdistan/North)
- Kurdish Hezbollah
- Hilafet Devleti (HD) (The Caliphate State) (also known as Kaplancılar)
- İslami Büyük Doğu Akıncılar Cephesi (İBDA/C) (Great Eastern Islamic Raiders' Front)
- Tevhid-Selam (Kudüs Ordusu) (The Army of Jerusalem)
- Hizb ut-Tahrir - Party of Liberation

Teyrêbazên Azadiya Kurdistan (TAK), that is Kurdistan Freedom Hawks in Kurdish, is not on the list despite being designated as a terrorist organisation by the United States, EU and the UK. However US designation of TAK as a terrorist organisation has taken place in January 2008. It is not clear whether or not TAK carries out militant activities only or both militant and political activities.

== Inactive illegal parties ==
According to H. A. Özhan there are eight important organisations that are illegal political parties in the history of modern Turkey. Only TKP/ML from his list is still active. The other seven are as follows:

- Türkiye İhtilalci İşçi Köylü Partisi (Revolutionary Workers' and Peasants' Party of Turkey)
- Türkiye Halk Kurtuluş Ordusu (People's Liberation Army of Turkey)
- Türkiye Halk Kurtuluş Partisi-Cephesi (People's Liberation Party-Front of Turkey)
- Türkiye Komünist Emek Partisi (Communist Labor Party of Turkey)
- Türkiye Komünist Partisi/Birlik (Communist Party of Turkey/Union)

Other organisations that can be categorized as illegal political parties in Turkey include the following:

- Islamic Party of Kurdistan
- Kurdish Islamic Movement

== See also ==
- List of political parties in Turkey
- Communist Party of Turkey (disambiguation), for other groups using similar names
