= Communist Party of Turkey (historical) =

Political party (1920–1988)

Communist Party of Turkey Türkiye Komünist Partisi
- Leader: Mustafa Suphi
- General Secretary: Ethem Nejat
- Founded: 10 September 1920
- Dissolved: 1988
- Merged into: United Communist Party of Turkey
- Youth Wing: Progressive Youth Association
- Ideology: Communism; Marxism–Leninism
- International affiliation: Comintern
- Colours: Red

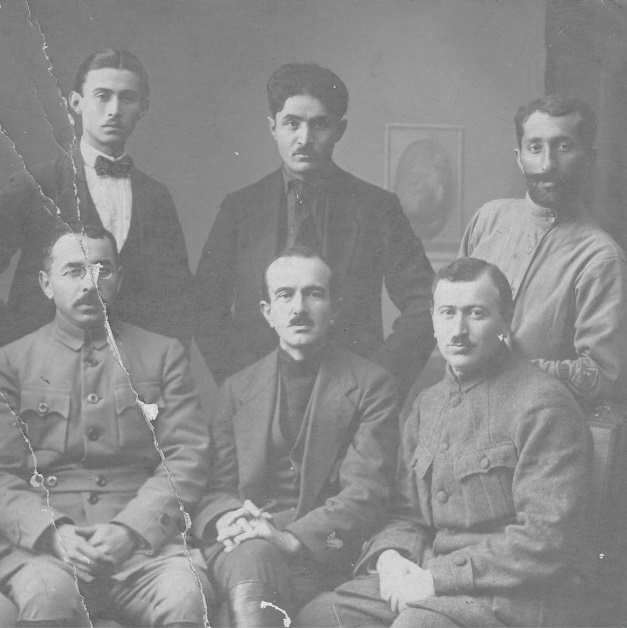
Communist Party of Turkey founder Mustafa Suphi (left), general secretary Ethem Nejat (middle), and İsmail Hakkı (right) (bottom row)

The Communist Party of Turkey (Turkish: Türkiye Komünist Partisi, TKP) was a political party in Turkey. The party was founded by Mustafa Suphi in 1920, and was soon to be banned. It worked as a clandestine opposition party throughout the Cold War era, and was persecuted by the various military regimes. Many intellectuals, like Nâzım Hikmet, joined the party's ranks. In 1988, the party merged into the United Communist Party of Turkey, in an attempt to gain legal status. The TKP was active from 1920 until its dissolution in 1988, and it was banned in Turkey in 1925 in order to ensure the country's security after the Sheikh Said Rebellion in Eastern Turkey. The party was legalized again after the Second World War, albeit with very limited power and it was heavily monitored by the Turkish government. However, after 1947 it was banned yet again and many of its leading figures were arrested and detained by the authorities. Initially adopting non-violent methods of introducing reform, the party began to adopt revolutionary viewpoints in the 1960s until its dissolution.

== Early history ==
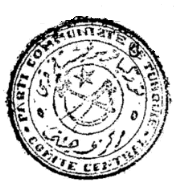
Stamp of the TKP Central Committee, 1920. It shows a cutlass, hammer, sickle, and a star in the emblem in the middle. 'Communist Party of Turkey – Central Committee' is written in Ottoman Turkish and French languages.

The party was founded at a congress in Baku on 10 September 1920, gathering together elements from three different left-wing tendencies influenced by the October Revolution in Russia. These founding tendencies were the Istanbul-based Turkish Workers and Peasants Socialist Party (Turkish: Türkiye İşçi ve Çiftçi Sosyalist Fırkası), elements of the Green Army (Turkish: Yeşil Ordu) in Anatolia (which represented the left-wing sectors of the national liberation movement), and a group of Turkish communists in Soviet Russia (largely made up by Turkish prisoners of war, who had been recruited by the Bolsheviks), including Süleyman Nuri. In total the congress was made up of 74 delegates. The congress elected Mustafa Suphi as the party chairman, and Ethem Nejat as the general secretary.

The party was formed by individuals who believed that the Ottoman Empire could no longer support its people, especially after the First World War. Its founding members were united in ending social injustice and economic inequality amongst the empire's citizens, and to drive out the Western powers carving up Anatolia among themselves. Other notable members who played important roles in the TKP include Fuat Sabit and Şefik Hüsnü. Meanwhile, Nâzım Hikmet, the Turkish poet and intellectual, was active in the communist world and the TKP, meeting and working with individuals such as Vâlâ Nureddin, Ahmet Cevat, and Şevket Süreyya Aydemir. Most of the party's members were learned individuals, and they did not belong to the military wing of the Ottoman Empire. Even at the lowest levels of the party, the members were Turkish nationalists who, after the October Revolution of 1917 in the Russian Empire, became heavily tied to the Communist Party of the Soviet Union (CPSU). Hüsnü was inspired by the events of the 1905 Russian Revolution, and he adopted leftist ideology and viewpoints as a result.

Following the 1925 Sheikh Said rebellion, the TKP was banned in the country. Ismet İnönü, then the Prime Minister of Turkey, lead preparations for the government's response to the rebellion. He took the Sheikh Said rebellion as an opportunity to crack down on all opposition that he deemed to be a threat against the new Turkish government, with the passing of the Law for the Maintenance of Order (Ottoman Turkish: Takrir-i Sükûn Kanunu). Turkey thus became a one-party state and the TKP was forced to go underground after they were banned.

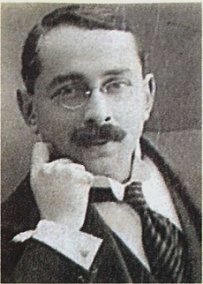
Mustafa Suphi with other 14 communists were murdered on 28 January 1921 after setting sail from Trabzon.

After its foundation, the party was recognized as section of the Communist International (Comintern). The founding of TKP occurred in the midst of the Independence War, following the defeat of the Ottoman Empire in the First World War.

In order to counter the growing influence of Turkish communists, Mustafa Kemal set up a parallel puppet communist party named Turkish Communist Party (Turkish: Türk Komünist Fırkası (TKF)). This provoked the founding of the People's Communist Party of Turkey (Turkish: Türkiye Halk İştirakiyyun Fırkası) in 1920. Although technically a separate party, the TKP cadres were also present in the leadership of the People's Communist Party.

At the end of 1920, TKF applied for Comintern membership, but following the pressure by Communist Party of Turkey, TKF was not accepted to the 3rd World Congress of the Communist International as a member.

On 28 January 1921, the founders of TKP, Mustafa Suphi and his 14 other comrades, were murdered. It is not known who was behind the assassination. According to the official version, Mustafa Suphi was killed by the order of the Ottoman Sultan because of his support to the liberation of Turkey.

== Second congress ==
In December 1921, the People's Communist Party was legalized. This provided an opportunity for TKP to work in a more open manner. The People's Communist Party held its congress in August, which the TKP considered as its second congress. The congress elected Salih Hacıoğlu as the party general secretary. The People's Communist Party was banned the next month, and around 200 party cadres were arrested.

== Third congress ==
The third party congress was held in Istanbul, in January 1925. The congress elected Şefik Hüsnü as the new general secretary. Hüsnü's group in Istanbul had conducted semi-legal activities and published Aydınlık. On instructions from the Comintern, the party started to publish Orak-Çekiç, which in contrast to Aydınlık was directed towards the working class.

The sole delegate from the left of the party was Salih Hacıoğlu, who would later perish in the purges in Russia during the 1930s.

The TKP suffered three waves of crackdowns on its cadres, in 1925, 1927 and 1929. But in addition to the external pressure, the party also suffered from internal divisions. The role of the party towards the Comintern and the governing CHP party were issues of disputes.

Albeit an illegal party, the TKP issued a series of publications like Kızıl Istanbul (1930–1935), Bolşevik (1927), Komünist (1929) and İnkılap Yolu (published in Berlin 1930–1932). The party organized a party conference in Vienna in 1926, where a new party program was formulated, which was more critical towards Kemalism.

== Fourth congress ==
The fourth TKP congress was held in 1932. Hüsnü was reelected as the party general secretary.

== Collapse and resurgence ==
In 1951, the TKP effectively collapsed after many of its leaders were arrested by the authorities. Thereafter, in order to keep a low profile in Turkey, the party established a foreign bureau that had connections to Moscow. Mihri Belli, a Turkish revolutionary, claimed that he was assigned this task to establish this foreign bureau. This order would make him the de facto leader of the party, a title he refused to adopt.

In the 1960s the Workers Party of Turkey (Türkiye İşçi Partisi) emerged as a strong force. The foundation of TİP occurred as there was a relatively more open political atmosphere at the time. TİP became a leading force within the trade union movement, leading the Confederation of Revolutionary Trade Unions (DISK), which was founded in 1967. In addition to that, TİP became the first Turkish political party that put the Kurdish Question into its agenda.

However, as the political situation became yet more intense, and the more radical wings of the left movement opted for armed struggle, TİP was banned. The banning of TİP would strengthen the TKP, as many TİP cadres now joined the underground TKP instead. It led semi-legal mass organizations, and became the leading force within DİSK.

After the 1960 coup d'état, the government adopted a new constitution that allowed more political freedoms than ever before, or since the country's founding. Despite this, open communists were still restricted in legally organizing, and this heavily applied to the TKP. The TKP believed that change could be implemented through democratic reforms, but after 1960 the party adopted a more revolutionary approach, even if it was not as politically active when compared to the 1920s.

== Atılım era ==
At the beginning of the 1970s, labour organisations and left wing political parties faced with the despotism of 1971 Turkish coup d'état. Despite the pressure of the military junta, this communist movement rose and changed the political situation in Turkey. The riots of the university students in 1968, and the big strike of workers in 15–16 June 1970, became major sources of inspiration for this event. Under the leadership of General Secretary İsmail Bilen, the TKP saw this trend as a new era of revolution and reform, so named it as Atılım which means leap in Turkish. Despite the party's illegality, and the problems of working underground, the TKP found a way to intervene in the political agenda of the country with the support of DISK. This era of progress for TKP and the other left wing organisations in Turkey was ended by the 1980 Turkish coup d'état.

== Fifth congress ==
The fifth TKP congress was held in 1983. İsmail Bilen was elected as party chairman and Haydar Kutlu as general secretary. TKP criticized the US intervention in Lebanon, Nicaragua and El Salvador.

== Dissolution and merger into TBKP ==
As a result of the 1980 military coup, left-wing and communist parties were forced to go underground. The TKP merged with the TİP and formed the United Communist Party of Turkey (TBKP) in 1988 under the motto "unity, renewal and legality". Both of the leaders the TKP and TİP, Haydar Kutlu and Nihat Sargın respectively, returned from their political exile in on 16 November 1987 to establish the new TKBP, but they were immediately arrested and held in custody until April 1990. The political atmosphere in Turkey was more restrictive than in previous years, so much so that the European Parliament stated that "recognizing that a political democracy cannot yet be considered to exist in Turkey while major political parties remain unrepresented in the country's parliament, while leading political figures were excluded from active political life, while the Turkish Communist Party remains under a total ban." Due to the ban on communist political activities in Turkey, the TBKP initially had to be formed in a clandestine congress, immediately following the sixth congress of TKP simultaneously with the congress of TİP. But from the outset, it stated its aim to operate legally.

In 1990, its leaders officially established the TBKP as a formal political party, which would be banned the next year after a lengthy court case. Nevertheless, before it was banned, the TBKP had already held a legal congress in January 1991, and in this congress a resolution was overwhelmingly adopted calling on all its members to join a project to form a broader-based socialist party, the Socialist Unity Party, which would itself eventually evolve, after a series of subsequent mergers, into the Freedom and Solidarity Party. However the Freedom and Solidarity Party also experienced more splits leaving the party with no links to the historical Communist Party of Turkey.

== Claims of heritage ==
Currently there are several factions in Turkey that claim to represent the historical TKP:

- the TKP that separated in 1979 from the main TKP and became known after the periodical İşçinin Sesi (Worker's Voice) which they issued;
- current TKP, which adopted the name in 2001, founded as the Party for Socialist Power (SİP) in 1993, which has no organisational link with the historical TKP.
- a grouping of some dissident members of the TBKP who held a "rebirth meeting" in 1993, started to publish the periodical Ürün Sosyalist Dergi (Harvest Socialist Magazine). Actually, in the aim of giving out the voice of TKP through a legal path, the first publication of Ürün Sosyalist Dergi was made in 1974, but the martial law authority banned its publication in 1980. After the "rebirth meeting" in 1993, the contributors of the meeting restarted the periodicals publication in 1997. Almost after a decade, the group which summoned up around this publication, expanded enough to reestablish the TKP again. In 2012, they officially announced the reestablishment of the TKP. But this initiative resulted as a dichotomy, because of the existence of another party (Former SIP) which started to use the same name in 2001. So the contributors of the rebirth initiative decided to change the official name of the TKP as 1920 TKP.

== See also ==
- List of illegal political parties in Turkey
- Communist Party of Turkey (disambiguation), for other communist parties in Turkey
