= Workers' Party of Turkey (2017) =

Workers' Party of Turkey Türkiye İşçi Partisi
- Abbreviation: TİP
- President: Erkan Baş
- Spokesperson: Sera Kadıgil
- Vice-president: Doğan Ergün
- Founded: 7 November 2017
- Preceded by: HTKP
- Headquarters: Çankaya, Ankara
- Membership (2026): ▼35,130
- Ideology: Communism; Marxism–Leninism; Left-wing populism; Progressivism
- Political position: Left-wing to far-left
- National affiliation: Labour and Freedom Alliance
- Colours: Red and White
- Grand National Assembly: 3 / 600
- District municipalities: 2 / 922
- Provincial councillors: 1 / 1,282
- Municipal Assemblies: 36 / 20,953

Party flag

Website
- tip.org.tr

The Workers' Party of Turkey (Turkish: Türkiye İşçi Partisi, TİP) is a Marxist-Leninist communist party in Turkey. The party was founded out of a split in the Communist Party of Turkey (TKP). As a result of the internal strife between two rival factions, the group led by former chairman Erkan Baş initially established People's Communist Party of Turkey (HTKP) in 2014, and after three years, it was rebranded as the Workers' Party of Turkey in 2017.

Adopting Marxism-Leninism as its guide and reconciling it with left-wing populism, the TİP is against capitalism, imperialism, and all forms of exploitation, oppression and discrimination. The party embraces progressive values such as laicism and public ownership, and struggles for the preservation and improvement of democratic and civil rights, freedom of organization, assembly, speech and press. It also strongly advocates for the rights of the Kurdish people, women and LGBTQ people in Turkey.

In the most recent general election held in 2023, the TİP, as a part of the Labour and Freedom Alliance, secured a vote share of 1.76%, allowing it to be represented in the Turkish parliament with four MPs including the chairman, Erkan Baş, the spokesperson, Sera Kadıgil, Istanbul MP Ahmet Şık, and Hatay MP Can Atalay. This achievement represents the highest number of vote shares ever attained by a socialist party in Turkey since 1965.

The party has an unusually high proportion of women and young people running its organization compared to other parties in Turkey. The TİP's aim is to encourage the spread and growth of grassroots organizations in order to strengthen the socialist movement.

Since 2017, TİP has established local branches in over 40 cities and districts and is eligible to take part in Turkish elections.

== History ==
=== First and second TİPs in the 1960s and 1970s ===
The leaders of contemporary TİP claim that the party is a successor to the historical Workers' Party of Turkey, which was originally established by a small group of trade unionists in 1961, with the idea of sending workers' representatives to the Turkish Parliament. The first TİP organized and led by well-known Turkish Marxists such as its first chairman Mehmet Ali Aybar, ex-professors Behice Boran and Sadun Aren, and Mihri Belli not only introduced socialism in Turkish politics for the first time but also achieved electoral success in 1965 general elections by winning 15 MPs.

However, the combination of ideological differences and personal rivalries within the party led to its failure in the 1969 elections, and eventually, the party was disbanded by a court order in 1972 following the military coup of 1971. After the general amnesty in 1974, the party was legally re-established by Behice Boran in 1975. This second TİP could not match the popularity of the first one, and was once again banned after the military coup in 1980. Even though TİP was declared illegal by the military junta, it continued to operate secretly in exile. In 1987, it merged with the Communist Party of Turkey (TKP), to form a single organization, the United Communist Party of Turkey (TBKP).

=== Split in the Communist Party of Turkey and foundation of the third TİP ===
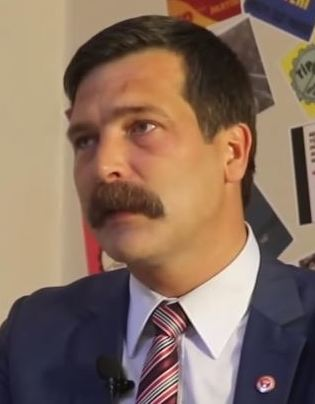
Erkan Baş, the chairman and founder of TİP.

The current TİP was reborn in 2017 out of a split in the Communist Party of Turkey (TKP), which dates back three years earlier. After the Gezi Park protests in Turkey, in 2014, some organizational and ideological disagreements arose among the members of the Central Committee of the TKP. Several prominent members of the committee, including former party-president Erkan Baş and Metin Çulhaoğlu, left the party and established the People's Communist Party of Turkey (HTKP). A year later, the party also became one of the founders of the United June Movement (BHH), a political coalition of left-wing, communist, and socialist parties in Turkey.

However, HTKP faced internal strife in 2015 as a result of a dispute over the party's support for Peoples' Democratic Party (HDP) in the upcoming general elections, leading to another split and the foundation of Communist Movement of Turkey (TKH), a faction strongly criticized such decision. In 2017, the remaining cadres under the leadership of Erkan Baş decided to rename the party as TİP, and laid claims to the historical legacy of former TİPs.

The declaration document laying out the foundation of the TİP has been signed by 146 people, including Erkan Baş, Barış Atay, Tuncay Çelen, Metin Çulhaoğlu, previous TİP and TKP members, various representatives from mass organizations and trade unions, workers, students, and academics. The party was officially founded on 7 November 2017. In 2018, the Constitutional Court of Turkey gave its approval for the party to use its name, as the party had previously been banned and outlawed in the 1970s.

=== From the 2018 general elections onwards ===
==== 2018 general elections ====
For the Turkish parliamentary election of 2018, the party decided to collaborate with the Peoples' Democratic Party (HDP). This was primarily because the newly established TİP was ineligible to run candidates at that time due to the election law in Turkey. The electoral alliance allowed it to be represented in the Turkish parliament by two MPs who have been elected on HDP lists. The chairperson, Erkan Baş was elected from Istanbul's first electoral district whereas the deputy chairperson, Barış Atay, was elected from Hatay province. Likewise, in the presidential election, the TİP endorsed the candidacy of Selahattin Demirtaş, the co-leader of HDP who had been imprisoned since 2016.

In the following years, the TİP welcomed new MPs. First, Ahmet Şık, an investigative journalist and trade unionist, resigned from HDP and soon joined the party in April 2021. Lastly, Republican People's Party's (CHP) İstanbul deputy and lawyer, Sera Kadıgil, announced her resignation in June 2021, and she joined the TİP, increasing the total number of party's MPs to four.

During their terms in the parliament, TİP MPs have been vocal about the need for greater democratic reforms in the country and active in addressing social issues affecting the population, such as poverty, corruption, gender inequality, and discrimination against minority groups. This parliamentary performance, along with grassroots activism, helped to increase the party's visibility, particularly among young people, and led to a surge in popularity.

==== 2023 general elections ====
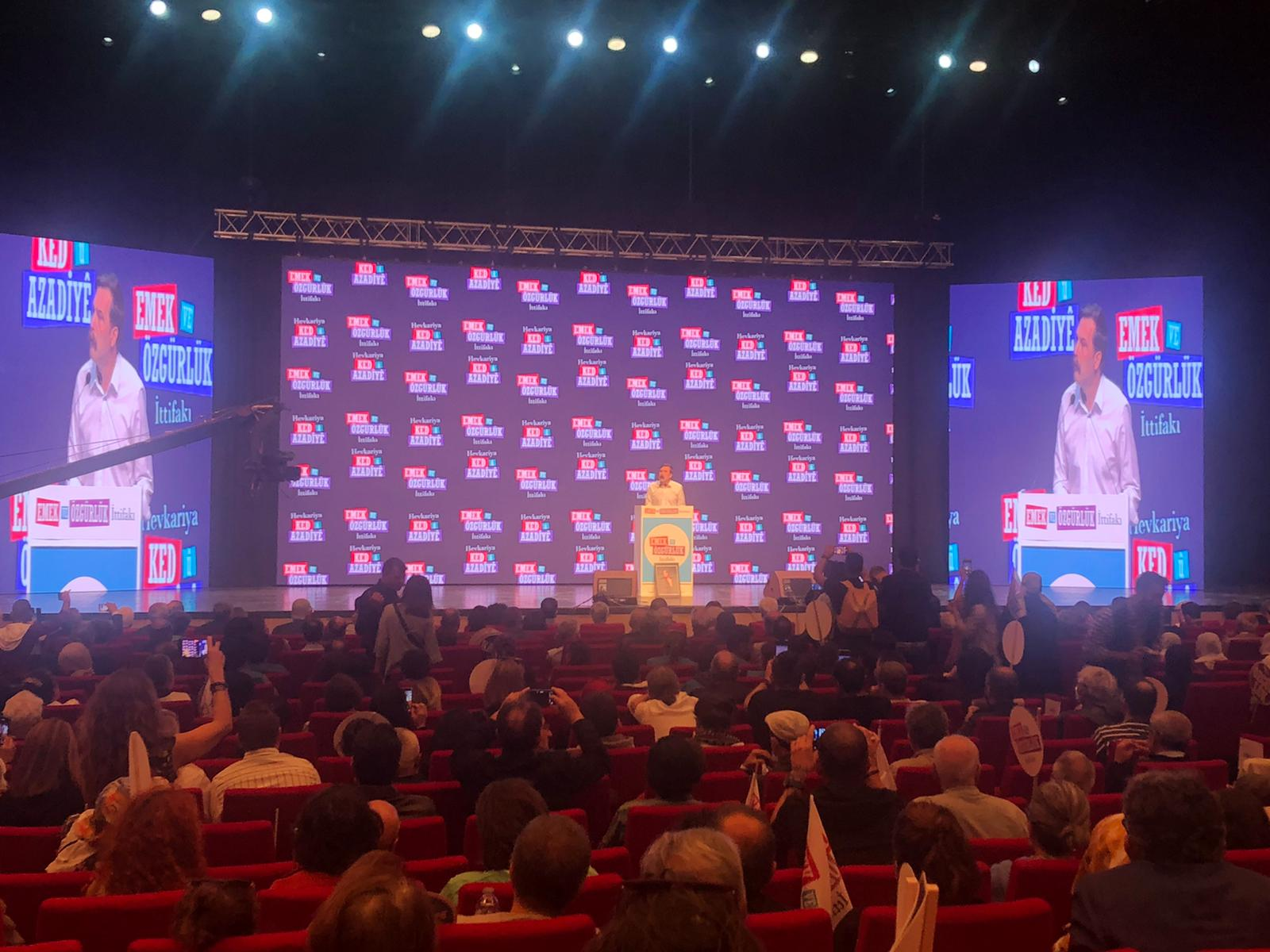
Erkan Baş giving a speech in the public announcement for Labour and Freedom Alliance in 2022.

Three years after its foundation, the party could complete its nationwide organization by establishing local branches all over the country. By 2020, the number of its organizations exceeded the legal threshold required to participate in the elections and it fulfilled all of the mandatory conditions defined in the Law on Political Parties in Turkey.

In its preparation for the general elections in 2023, the TİP leadership decided to maintain its electoral alliance with HDP, and they formed the Labour and Freedom Alliance together with other left-wing political parties such as Labour Party (EMEP) in August 2022. The constituent parties of the alliance jointly released a declaration, proclaiming that the alliance aims to bring a radical political change in the country on the basis of equality, freedom, fraternity, peace, and democracy.

However, unlike the previous election in 2018, the TİP decided to field its own candidates as it is eligible to do so in the parliamentary election of 2023 rather than nominating MPs on the joint list of HDP, which enters the election under Green Left Party (YSP) due to the increasing threat of a lawsuit calling for its closure. Also, the TİP collaborated with the Greens' Party (Yeşiller) and the Workers' Democracy Party (İDP) and the candidates from these two parties run on the TİP's list.

Although the party initially set a target of a 3% vote share in the legislative elections to gain enough seats to form a parliamentary group, it narrowly fell short of this goal. However, the TİP achieved the highest vote share ever attained by a socialist party in Turkey since 1965. The chairman, Erkan Baş, the spokesperson, Sera Kadıgil, and Istanbul MP Ahmet Şık were reelected. Furthermore, Can Atalay, a lawyer who was convicted in the Gezi Park trial in 2022, was elected from Hatay province. Despite two rulings from the Constitutional Court of Turkey declaring a violation of rights, Can Atalay, who has not been released, lost his parliamentary status as a result of a decision from the 3rd Criminal Division of the Court of Cassation, which was announced during the General Assembly of the Parliament on 30 January 2024.

For the presidential elections, on the other hand, the Labour and Freedom Alliance decided not to field a candidate and the TİP openly endorsed Kemal Kılıçdaroğlu, the leader of the centre-left Republican People's Party (CHP) and the presidential candidate of Nation Alliance, a political alliance made up of six opposition parties with different political ideologies to contest in the elections. The party announced that it prioritizes the possible election defeat of the president Recep Tayyip Erdoğan by the joint candidate of all opposition forces in the first round of the election and the transition to the parliamentary system in Turkey as quickly as possible after the election as promised by Kılıçdaroğlu.

==== 2024 municipal elections ====
In the 2024 municipal elections, TİP ran candidates in many precincts. Erkan Baş, the leader of the party, stood as a mayoral candidate in Gebze, a strategically significant district in the industrially dense Kocaeli province. This candidacy was a notable move for TİP, as it highlighted their ambition to establish a foothold in critical urban and industrial regions. Recognizing the potential for vote-splitting among opposition parties, the Republican People's Party (CHP) and the Green Left Party (YSP) chose not to field their own candidates in Gebze. This decision reflected a broader strategy among opposition forces to consolidate votes in areas where a competitive race could otherwise benefit the ruling Justice and Development Party (AKP) or its allies. Despite this tactical alliance, Erkan Baş secured 40,438 votes, accounting for 19.92% of the total vote, finishing in third place.

TİP won a precinct, in Samandağ, Hatay.

== Ideology and program ==
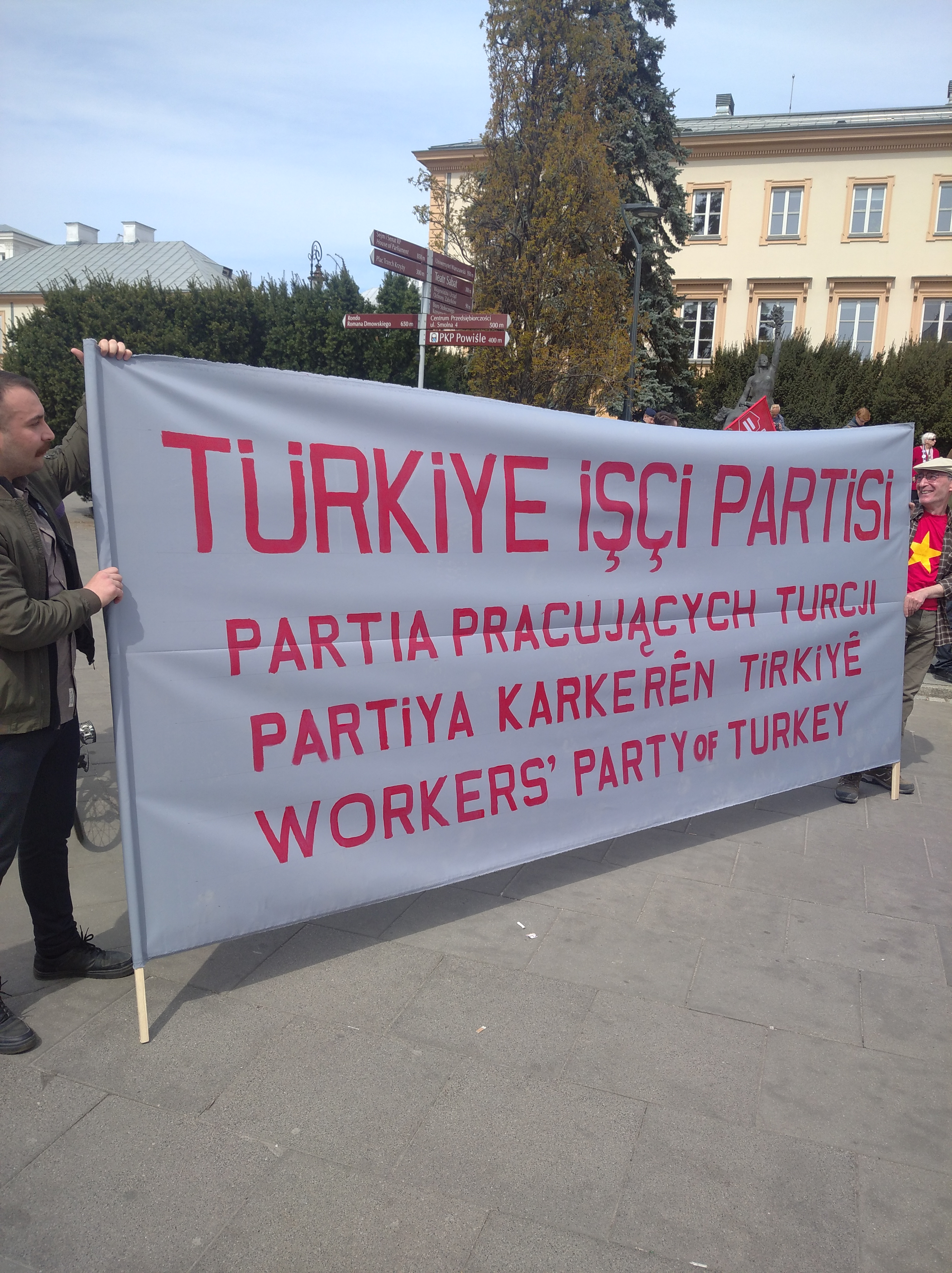
Workers' Party of Turkey in Poland.

As emphasized in its program, the Workers’ Party of Turkey is an internationalist, and working-class party, guided by the philosophy of Marxism–Leninism. According to the party program, which begins with a section entitled "The Actuality of Socialism", the aim of the party is the seizing of the political power by the working class and its allies. Party states that it is against the political establishment and the political elite in Turkey, emphasizing the antagonism between the people and the elite. This antagonism is materialized as "99% against a handful of greedy cronies" by Erkan Baş, as an example. Tanıl Bora characterized the ideological outlook of the party as a "reconciliation of left-wing populism and Marxist orthodoxy". As a response, party executive member and author Can Soyer concurred that the ideological direction of the party fits into characterization offered by Tanıl Bora.

Members of the Workers' Party of Turkey distributing pamphlets in Kadıköy.

The Workers’ Party of Turkey is against NATO as it considers it to be an extension of capitalism and imperialism. Similarly, the party openly opposes authoritarian regimes and its leaders, such as Russia, United Arab Emirates and Saudi Arabia. The TİP condemned the Russian invasion of Ukraine, especially Putin's aggressive expansionist policies and NATO encroachment, calling for peace and avoiding further spread and escalation of the conflict. The party advocates freedoms, republicanism, democracy and secularism and positions itself against the racist, fascist and sectarian tendencies which became more widespread both in Turkey and in the world. In their publications and speeches, the party's members of parliament voice their belief in the importance of social movements such as the women's movement, the environmental movement and the LGBTQ movement. The TİP also aims to create a democratic system where the people represent themselves and have the political power in the country, rather than this power being limited to the elite. In that sense, Erkan Baş urged for the implementation of participatory politics for all of the society, transforming the people into "political subjects" through means including e-democracy, direct democracy and popular participation and transparency.

The Workers’ Party of Turkey opposes all foreign interventions of the imperialist actors, especially those targeting the Middle East, Caucasus and the Balkans, and aggressive actions participated by the Turkish government as well. In line with their position, in October 2021, TİP parliamentarians voted against the mandate extending the Turkish military deployment in Syria and Iraq until 2023.

The party advocates peace and fraternity between the Turkish and Kurdish peoples in Turkey and among the peoples in the world and in the region.

== International relations ==
The party has an International Committee that propagates the policies of the party internationally in different world languages. International Committee publishes a monthly bulletin in the English language.

== Election results ==
=== Parliamentary elections ===
Year	Leader	Votes	%	Seats	+/–	Position
2018	Erkan Baş			2 / 600	▲2 (Note: Contested within HDP)	Opposition
2023	Erkan Baş	956,057	1.76%	4 / 600	▲4	Opposition

=== Local elections ===
Election date	Leader	Councillors			Municipalities			
Election date	Leader	Popular Vote	%	±	Popular Vote	%	#	±
2024	Erkan Baş	281,490	0.55 (#11)	new	71,108	0.15 (#15)	2 / 1,389	new

== See also ==
- Workers' Party of Turkey (1961)
