= Diyarbakır Prison =

Prison in Diyarbakır, Turkey

Coordinates: 37°55′44″N 40°11′49″E

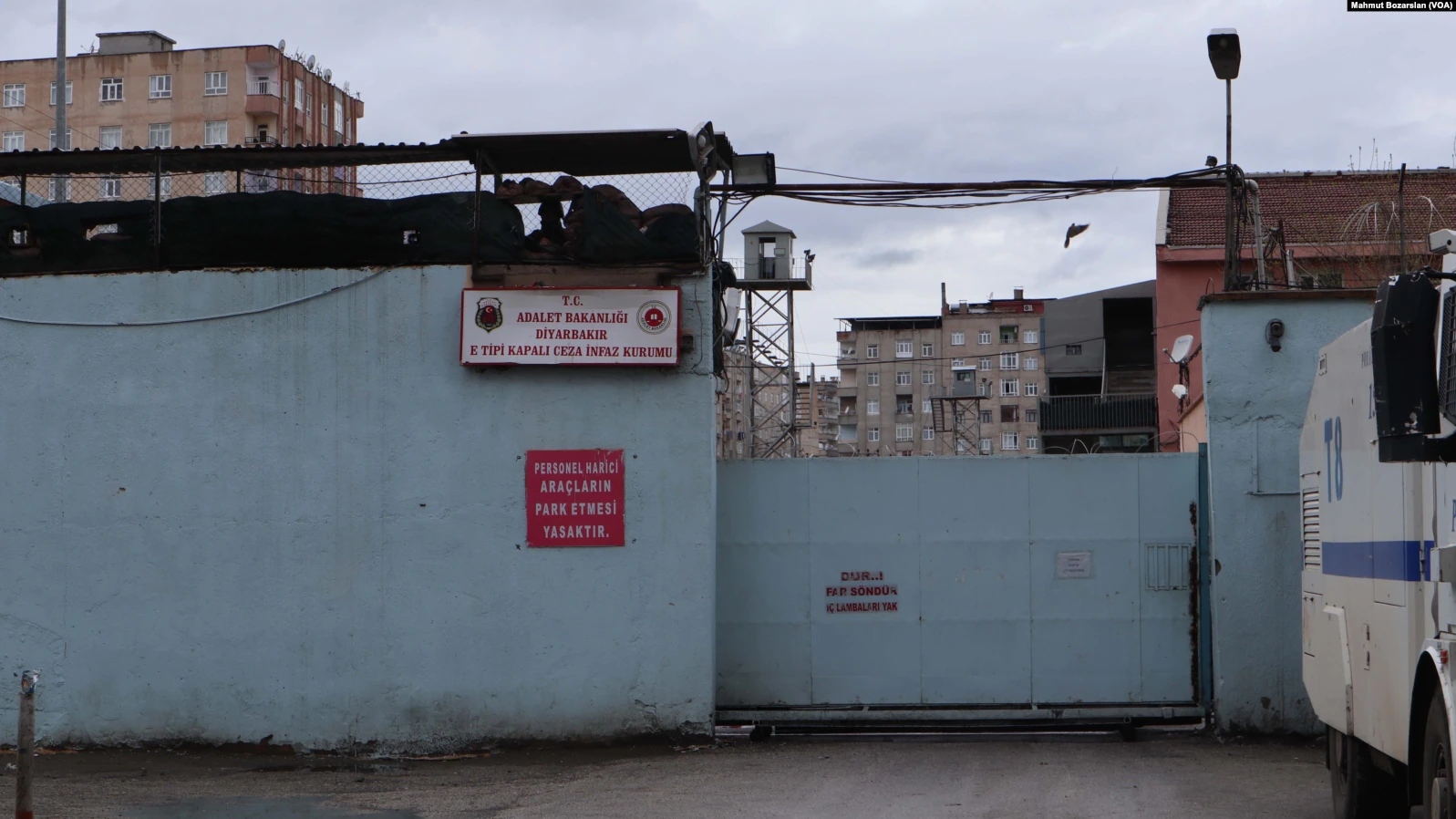
- Interactive map of Diyarbakır Prison
- Location: Diyarbakır, Turkey
- Status: Operational
- Security class: D-type and E-type
- Capacity: 688 (D-type), 744 (E-type)
- Opened: 1980
- Managed by: Directorate General of Penitentiaries, Ministry of Justice

Diyarbakır Prison (Turkish: Diyarbakır Cezaevi; Kurdish: Girtîgeha Amedê) is a prison located in the city of Diyarbakır, in southeastern Turkey. It was established in 1980 as an E-type prison by the Ministry of Justice. After the September 12, 1980 Turkish coup d'état, the facility was transferred to military administration and became a Martial Law Military Prison (Turkish: Sıkıyönetim Askeri Cezaevi). Control of the prison was returned to the Ministry of Justice on May 8, 1988.

The capacity of Diyarbakır E-type Prison is 744. However, the prison is sometimes overcrowded. When the Human Rights Commission in the Grand National Assembly of Turkey (GNAT) visited the prison in October 1996 it had a capacity of 650 and was accommodating 942 prisoners. The Diyarbakır D-type prison, housing political prisoners, can hold 688 people.

What has been called "the period of barbarity" (vahşet dönemi) or "the hell of Diyarbakır" (Diyarbakır cehennemi), refers to the early and mid-1980s (in particular the years between 1981 and 1984) where the prisoners in the newly built Diyarbakır Military Prison No. 5 were exposed to systematic torture. Between 1981 and 1984, 34 prisoners died. According to The Times, as of 2008 it is among the "ten most notorious jails in the world."

In August 2009, plans were announced to convert the facility into a school. The idea was criticized by Kurdish activists who wanted the prison to become a museum of human rights abuses. Although construction on a larger prison outside of the city has already begun, no decision over what to do with the existing Diyarbakir prison has been made. Kurdish activists and politicians find their plans for a human rights museum, known as the "Museum of Shame," largely ignored by the state government. As of now, Diyarbakır is still a functioning prison.

== History ==
In the 19th century, Diyarbakır prison was known throughout the Ottoman Empire as the home of harsh and feared sentences given to political prisoners. It was established in the form of a modern prison in 1864.

=== Early 1980s ===
After the military coup of 12 September 1980, the generals abolished parliament, suspended the Constitution and banned all political parties and trade unions, and most other organizations. Until the return of a democratic government in 1984, visits of civilians to prisoners, by family members as well as lawyers of the defense was prohibited. Tens of thousands of men and women were taken into custody. More than 30,000 were jailed in the first four months after the coup. During the following years, Amnesty International received thousands of allegations of torture including reports of over 100 deaths as a result of torture. Diyarbakır Prison became one of the most lasting symbols of the coup due to the reports of hundreds of prisoners being subjected to torture and execution. At the time, it was not allowed to speak in another language than Turkish, a rule, which was also upheld during visits, and Kurds were thought to be Turkified. Inmates were obliged to memorize the Turkish national anthem and other Turkish nationalist songs.

Among Diyarbakır's better-known inmates are Democratic Society Party (DTP) leader Ahmet Turk; former DTP deputies Nurettin Yılmaz, Celal Paydaş, and Mustafa Çakmak; former mayor Mehdi Zana; Kurdish writer and intellectual Orhan Miroğlu; and Kurdish poet Yılmaz Odabaşı. Bedii Tan, the father of Kurdish writer Altan Tan died in this prison as a result of torture.

== Conditions ==
The prison wards used terms usually employed for acts of diversion and cleanness such as disco, welcome, theatre or bathroom for the different styles of torture they practiced. Among the most common practices were: severe and systematic beating; pulling of hair; being stripped naked; being blindfolded and hosed; solitary confinement; guards' insults; constant and relentless surveillance and intimidation; death threats; the obligation to salute Captain Esat Oktay Yıldıran's dog, a German Shepherd called "Jo", which was trained to bite the genitals of naked prisoners; sleep, sensory, water and food deprivation for extensive periods; falaka (beating of the soles of feet), "Palestinian hangings" (hanging by the arms); stress positions or forcing prisoners to stand for long durations; excessive exercise in extreme temperatures; stretching, squeezing or crushing of limbs and genitals; piling of naked prisoners on top of each other; asphyxia and mock execution; electric shocks (specifically electrodes attached to genitals); burning with cigarettes; extraction of nails and healthy teeth; sexual humiliation and assault; rectal examinations; forcing prisoners to beat/sexually humiliate/rape or urinate on each other; rape or threat of rape of prisoners, or relatives of prisoners in their presence by prison guards; violent forcing of truncheon rectally; baths in prison sewers (referred to as "the disco" by the guards)."

Mehdi Zana, the former mayor of Diyarbakır, who spent eleven years in the prison, explains:

When a new prisoner arrived at the prison, Captain Esat met him at the entrance and then turned to a guard and said, 'Prepare him a bath; then take him to the dormitory.' This was a ritual. So almost twenty guards accompanied the prisoner. He received a good welcoming thrashing, and then he was dragged, unconscious, to the 'bath,' a bathtub full of shit in which they left him for a few hours.

Businessman Selim Dindar said "Before our detention we thought that torture was applied during interrogation and that the wards in prison were comfortable. But in Diyarbakır Prison we longed for the torture chambers of interrogation."

Among the large numbers of testimonies regarding that time only few have come from female prisoners staying in a separate ward. Nuran Çamlı Maraşlı is an example for it: "We were 75 women in a ward for 25 prisoners. As women we are not equal to men, but in Diyarbakır dungeon we were equal relating to torture, isolation, military drill etc. For years we did in prison what soldiers do in their barracks." Many books have been written on Diyarbakır Prison. Testimonies have also been published on the Internet and in the media. After the changes to the 1982 Constitution of Turkey in September 2010 hundreds of people who claim they were tortured at Diyarbakır Prison in the wake of the 1980 military coup have filed a series of criminal complaints at the local prosecutor's office to open a case against their abusers.

== Deaths in Diyarbakır Prison ==
Following the military coup of 1980 the number of people who died during interrogation or in prison increased. As a result of the unsanitary conditions and torture in prisons, 299 people died while incarcerated. Fourteen died during hunger strikes, 16 were shot to death because they were supposedly trying to escape from prison and 43 people committed suicide. On 18 May 1982, four young prisoners, Mahmut Zengin, Eşref Anyık, Ferhat Kurtay and Necmi Öner, rolled up in newspapers and sprayed with paint and holding hands, burned themselves alive in protest and have since become important figures in Kurdish collective memory and in the martyrdom discourse of the PKK. Like any other militant organization in Turkey the PKK calls all members who lose their lives in armed combat, but also in prison a martyr.

Not all prisoners who died in Diyarbakır Prison between 1981 and 1984 belonged to the PKK. Bedii Tan was an employee of a company that had been blackmailed by the PKK. Necmettin Büyükkaya, born in 1943 had started his political career in the Turkish Workers' Party (TİP). In 1969 he became the leader of the Revolutionary Cultural Eastern Hearths (tr: Devrimci Doğu Kültür Ocakları, DDKO). Later he joined the KDP in Turkey (T-KDP). Remzi Aytürk was affiliated to Rizgarî (Kurdish for Liberation) also known as Kurdistan Liberation Party (kr: Partiya Rizgariya Kurdistanê). Yılmaz Demir was on trial for membership of "Freedom Road" (tr: Özgürlük Yolu) later known as Socialist Party of Kurdistan. PSK (kr: Partiya Sosyaliste Kurdistana) not to be confused with the Revolutionary Party of Kurdistan, (kr: Partiya Şoreşa Kürdistan (PŞK) or even the PKK. İsmail Kıran (surname sometimes spelled Karak) and Orhan Keskin were alleged members of Devrimci Yol (Revolutionary Path).

The prisoners that died in Diyarbakır Prison between 1981 and 1984 are:

Name	Date of death	Cause of death
Ali Erek	1981-04-20	hunger strike
Abdurrahman Çeçen	1981-04-27	tortured
Ali Sarıbal	1981-11-13	tortured
İbiş Ural	1981-12-27	tortured
Cemal Kılıç	1982-02-23	tortured
Önder Demirok	1982-03-08	tortured
Mazlum Doğan	1982-03-21	suicide in protest at torture
Kenan Çiftçi	1982-04-21	tortured
Mahmut Zengin	1982-05-17	set himself on fire
Eşref Anyık	1982-05-17	set himself on fire
Ferhat Kutay	1982-05-17	set himself on fire
Necmi Öner	1982-05-17	set himself on fire
Mehmet Ali	1982-06-09	beaten to death
Bedii Tan	1982-07-14	beaten to death
Aziz Özbay	1982-08-23	tortured
Kemal Pir	1982-09-07	hunger strike
M.Hayri Durmuş	1982-09-12	hunger strike
Akif Yılmaz	1982-09-15	hunger strike
Ali Çiçek	1982-09-17	hunger strike
Seyithan Sak	1982-11-21	beaten to death
Aziz Büyükertaç	1982-12-22	tortured
Ramazan Yayan	1983-01-13	beaten to death
Mehmet Emin Akpınar	1983-01-25	beaten to death
Medet Özbadem	1983-05-20	beaten to death
İsmet Kıran	1983-11-01	tortured
Necmettin Büyükkaya	1984-01-23	beaten to death
Remzi Aytürk	1984-01-28	suicide
Cemal Arat	1984-03-02	hunger strike
Orhan Keskin	1984-03-05	hunger strike
Halil Ibrahim Baturalp	1984-04-27	beaten to death
Mehmet Kalkan	1987-06-14	died during interrogation
Yılmaz Demir	1984-01-00	suicide
Hüseyin Yüce	1984-05-00	beaten to death

=== Incident in 1996 ===
On 24 September 1996 special team members, gendarmes and prison warders stormed Diyarbakır Prison killing 10 inmates and wounding 46 prisoners The prisoners Erhan Hakan Perişan, Cemal Çam, Hakkı Tekin, Ahmet Çelik, Edip Derikçe, Mehmet Nimet Çakmak, Rıdvan Bulut, Mehmet Kadri Gümüş, Kadri Demir and Mehmet Aslan were killed. There are conflicting reports as to what really happened on that day in Diyarbakır Prison. The press accounts have produced scenarios that accord with the government's version of events. Some say that there was an uprising in the prison. Others note that the inmates wanted to visit the women's section of the jail. The delegation concluded "that the authorities in the government had prior knowledge of this incident and in fact some of them took part in its implementation."

According to the Secretary of the Diyarbakır Medical Association, Dr. Necdet İpekyüz, the followings happened:

"Of the 33 victims, 10 were dead. Ten injured ones were treated in Diyarbakır State Hospital and 13 injured inmates were transferred to Gaziantep State Hospital. All killings were the result of head injuries. On the day of the incident, two prison guards visited the hospital at about 10 am. They had very light bruises. The doctors on duty did not know why these guards were sent to the hospital for such minor things. Just before the attack on the inmates, the hospital staff received a call from the district attorney's office. The staff was told to be ready for an emergency to receive a large group of injured inmates."

=== Investigation into the incident ===
The incident was investigated by different groups and the public prosecutor. The Parliamentary Human Rights Commission stressed that "30 soldiers and 38 police officers, who exceeded the limits of their authority, had caused deaths." An investigation was launched against the prisoners who were attacked, beaten and wounded in Diyarbakır Prison. In the investigation launched against 23 prisoners, who were wounded in the attack, upon the instruction by Diyarbakır Public Prosecutor İbrahim Akbaş, the prisoners were accused of "damaging the state property and mutiny." In the investigation against the soldiers and police officers on duty the prosecution office gave a decision of non-prosecution under the Law on Prosecution of Civil Servants. The prosecution office alleged that "the soldiers and police officers tried not to inflict suffering on the prisoners."

The Parliamentary Human Rights Commission, stating that the prisoners were beaten to death, applied to the Prime Ministry and Ministries of Justice and Interior, demanding that 29 soldiers and 38 police officers be prosecuted. Upon this, Diyarbakır Provincial administrative Board decided on the prosecution of the security officers. Diyarbakır Public Prosecution Office, in January 1997, launched a trial against 65 people, 35 of whom are police officers and 30 soldiers.

The number of defendants increased to 72 defendants, but did not conclude until 2006. After the case had been transferred to Diyarbakır Criminal Court No. 2 a verdict was reached in the 59th hearing in February 2006. The Court sentenced 62 defendants first to 18 years' imprisonment for responsibility into more than one death. For various reasons the sentences were reduced to six years' imprisonment and for good conduct to five years and three months' imprisonment. The other defendants were acquitted or dropped because of the statute of limitation.

The verdict was quashed by the Court of Cassation ruling that the defendants had to be given the opportunity to plead, on changed charges and had to be heard again. On 30 September 2009 Diyarbakır Heavy Penal Court No. 3 went on hearing the case again.

=== Verdict of the European Court of Human Rights ===
On 20 May 2010 the European Court of Human Rights passed its verdict in the case of Perisan and Others v. Turkey (application no. 12336/03) The incident is described as:

The applicants and the Government presented differing accounts of the events. According to the applicants, following scuffles between two prisoners and the chief warder during a long wait by a group of prisoners to enter the visiting room, police officers and gendarmes armed with truncheons and batons had beaten the offending prisoners and their fellow inmates, in some cases to death. According to the Government, a riot had taken place that morning and prisoners armed with a variety of metal objects (taps, radiator pipes, lead piping, etc.) had attacked the warders.
The operation left 33 prisoners injured and 27 gendarmes with minor injuries. In December 1996, criminal proceedings were started against various members of the prison staff and against 65 gendarmes and police officers.

The Court ruled:

The Government's contention that the force used had been in response to an attack by prisoners armed with dangerous implements (taps, radiator pipes, lead piping, etc.) was undermined by the fact that the injuries sustained by the gendarmes had been localised and minor. It further considered that the force used against the prisoners, which had led to the deaths of eight of them, had not been "absolutely necessary" within the meaning of Article 2. There had therefore been a breach of that Article in respect of the prisoners who died.

== See also ==
- Aşkale labor camp
- Human rights in Turkey

== Testimonies ==
- The documentary "Prison No 5: 1980-84" prepared by Director Çayan Demirel contains about 100 minutes of enacted scenes and testimonies of witnesses. According to the Golden Apricot the film was awarded as Best Documentary (46th Antalya Golden Orange Film Festival, 2009), Best Documentary (Association of Film Critics, 2009) Best Documentary (21st Ankara International Film Festival, 2010). Parts of it (in Turkish and Kurdish language) can be found at YouTube (33 minutes). A shorter version (11 Minutes) is also available at YouTube. Both films can be watched with English subtitles.
- Orhan Miroğlu Torturers Will be Called to Account 28 September 2010
- Mehdi Zana Defence in Court, Kurdish and Turkish, this testimony was written against the verdict of Diyarbakır Military Court of 20 October 1983
- Yaşayanlar anlatıyor Collection of articles in Turkish
- Hamit Baldemir DİYAR BAKIR 5 NOLU ZİNDANINDA BİR DÖNEM 1984 OCAK DİRENİŞİ, 4 January 2011
