= Labour Party of Turkey =

Facts Labour party in Turkey

Labour Party of Turkey Türkiye Emekçi Partisi
- Chairperson: Mihri Belli
- General Secretary: Hamza Özkan, Şaban Ormanlar
- Governing body: General Committee
- Founded: February 12, 1975
- Banned: May 8, 1980
- Preceded by: Workers' Party of Turkey
- Headquarters: Istanbul
- Newspaper: Emekçi, Bağımsız Türkiye
- Ideology: Socialism
- Political position: Left-wing

The Labour Party of Turkey (Turkish: Türkiye Emekçi Partisi, abbreviated TEP) was a socialist political party in Turkey, led by Mihri Belli. TEP was founded in 1975, and sought to fill the political void created by the banning of the Workers' Party of Turkey (TİP) in 1971. The party remained a small organization. The leaders of the party were subjected to a lengthy political trial and suffered violent attacks. The party was banned in 1980 for promoting usage of Kurdish language in schools.

== Foundation and program ==
The Workers' Party of Turkey (TİP) was banned in 1971. With the March 14, 1974 amnesty for political and trade union activists, many jailed TİP cadres were released from jail. TEP was one of a number of competing initiatives in 1974-1975 to regroup elements of the former TİP into new legal socialist parties - along with Ahmet Kaçmaz's Socialist Workers Party of Turkey (TSİP), Mehmet Ali Aybar's Socialist Party (SP) and Behice Boran's refounded TİP ("İkinci TİP").

TEP was founded on February 12, 1975 by Mihri Belli, a former leader of the Communist Party of Turkey who had returned to the country in 1973. Other prominent founding members of TEP included Vecdi Özgüner, Şaban Ormanlar, Sevki Aksit, Mustafa Özçelik, Halil Oyman, Erol Yüce, Sefer Yılmaz and Faik Kalkavan.

TEP distinguished itself from the other contemporary legal socialist parties by upholding the National Democratic Revolution ('MDD', per its Turkish acronym) line. The party argued that Turkey would have to undergo a democratic transformation, abolishing remnants of feudalism, before being ready for transition to socialism. The party program called for "an independent and genuinely democratic Turkey heading towards socialism". The party program put forth as immediate tasks "the attainment of full independence for the country economically and politically and the democratization of political life within Turkey", and sought to build a 'Patriotic Front' of democratic forces under the leadership of the working class. TEP refused to take sides in the conflict between the Communist Parties of the Soviet Union and China, citing the Ho Chi Minh line of the Communist Party of Vietnam appealing for reconciliation between Moscow and Beijing on the basis of proletarian internationalism. The party challenged the legitimacy of the exiled TKP leadership based in the Socialist Bloc.

== Leadership, party organization and publications ==
TEP was founded as a legal party. It had its party centre in Istanbul. The party had organizations at province and district levels. The highest decision-making organ of the party was its national congress, which elected the General Committee of the party, which in turn elected the chairman, general secretaries and the Central Executive Committee of the party. Belli served as the chairman of the party. The party had two general secretaries - Hamza Özkan and Şaban Ormanlar. TEP ran the monthly publications Emekçi ('Labourer') and Bağımsız Türkiye ('Independent Turkey'). The party remained a minor force in Turkish politics, unable to gain a mass following. The party never contested any general elections.

TEP had a front organization among Turkish immigrants in West Germany, the Union of Turkish Socialists in Europe (Avrupa Türkiye Sosyalistler Birliği, ATSB). ATSB was estimated to have had some fifty members in the mid-1970s and had its headquarters in Munich.

== 1975 elections ==
In August 1975, TSİP appealed for a united front of socialist and leftist forces ahead of the October 12, 1975 Senate election. By early September 1975, a four party conference was held in Istanbul with the participation of TSİP, TEP, SP and the Turkish Unity Part (the latter, although not a socialist party, had an anti-Western outlook). The Istanbul conference was followed by a similar meeting in Ankara a few days later. In the end the meetings did not result in a united front, as the participating parties could only agree to the formation of a Consultative Socialist Bureau. The different socialist parties had different viewpoints on which party to support in the Senate election. TEP declared that it would support neither the TBP nor the Republican People's Party (CHP) in the election, with TEP followers being instructed to vote for the 'most progressive' candidate in their respective province. Belli argued that TEP "cannot support the CHP, as the CHP is not a progressive party, merely the least reactionary".

== Trial and ban ==
In November 1975 Belli was detained for refusing to present party documents at a security trial. He remained in detention for six months. On June 7, 1976 a trial of 33 leading TEP members began at the Istanbul State Security Court, based on an indictment dated April 21, 1976. They were charged per Article 141 of the Turkish Penal Code. The investigation alleged that the party was pursuing 'communist and Kurdish goals'. After the State Security Courts had been declared unconstitutional in November 1976 the TEP case was moved to a civilian court (the TEP case was moved to a military court in 1980).

On April 7, 1979 Belli survived an assassination attempt in Sultanahmet (Istanbul), for which the Grey Wolves were accused of responsibility. On May 8, 1980 the Constitutional Court of Turkey banned the party, reacting to the wordings in the party program supporting the right of the Kurdish people to have access to education in their mother tongue. The verdict found the TEP guilty of "attempting to create a sense of minority in the mind of a certain group of citizens [that] is contrary to the concept of the unity of the State with its territory and nation". The verdict made a reference to Article 83 of the Turkish Constitution, stating that official correspondence, education and national culture should only be in Turkish. On May 24, 1980 there was another Grey Wolves attack on the party – in which TEP executive committee member Vecdi Özgüner was wounded at his residence and his wife Sevinç was shot to death. Belli went into exile after the September 12, 1980 coup d'état.

== Later period ==
In 1982 TEP took part in the founding of the Unified Resistance Front against Fascism (FKBDC), in which the Kurdistan Workers' Party (PKK) and Dev-Yol were the dominant factions.

The 1976 trial of 33 TEP leaders concluded March 1986 with the acquittal of the defendants. After the TEP trial was over, Belli returned to Turkey in 1987 and joined the Freedom and Solidarity Party (ÖDP).
