= Nezihe Araz =

Turkish writer and journalist

Fatma Nezihe Araz
- Born: 11 May 1920
- Died: 25 July 2009 (aged 89)
- Education: Ankara Girls' High School; Ankara University
- Occupation: Writer Journalist

Fatma Nezihe Araz (11 May 1920 – 25 July 2009) was a Turkish writer and journalist. In addition to her 1959 best seller on the saints of Anatolia, she wrote several plays for television and the stage as well as three books about Atatürk.

== Early life ==
Araz was born on 11 May 1920 in Konya. She hailed from the eminent Bulgurzade family, renamed Araz after the Surname Law. Her father, Rıfat Araz, was an officer in Ziraat Bankası and was the bank's director in Konya at the time of her birth; he would later become a Member of Parliament for the Republican People's Party. Her mother's name for Müzeyye and she was the second wife of her father. She graduated from Ankara Girls' High School in 1941 and from the Department of Psychology and Philosophy in the Faculty of Language, History of Geography in Ankara University.

Whilst at university, she was heavily influenced by two of her lecturers, Muzaffer Şerif Başoğlu, who introduced the university to psychology, and Behice Boran. She was an ardent follower of their magazine Yurt ve Dünya and later, when they started publishing the magazine Adımlar, which was aligned with the Turkish Communist Party, she became a volunteer.

== Career ==
After she graduated, Araz became an assistant to Boran. However, when Boran was expelled from the university in 1948, Araz quit her job and was taken to Istanbul by her family, who wanted to take her away from leftist circles. The Araz family had always been religious and Araz's father was already affiliated with the religious order headed by Kenan Rıfai. By 1948, Araz had also become affiliated with this Sufi order and dropped her plans to become a scholar after meetings at Istanbul University. In 1950, she published her first book, Benim Dünyam ("My World"), a collection of poems. In 1951, after the death of Rıfai, she co-authored the book Ken’an Rifai ve Yirminci Asrın Işığında Müslümanlık ("Ken'an Rıfai and Islam in the Light of the 20th Century") with Samiha Ayverdi, Safiye Erol and Sofi Huri.

In 1952, she started her career in journalism at the magazine Resimli Hayat, owned by Şevket Rado. She later continued working with the same team in the magazine Hayat. In 1953, she published the book Fatih'in Deruni Tarihi, a biographical work on Mehmed II in the light of her religious approach. In 1956, Araz started working in the newspaper Havadis, owned by the Democrat-aligned Bahadır Dülger. Araz was sent to Mecca to write a series of reports to gain circulation. One of the photos published was of an Arab urinating next to a wall, this was reportedly met with outrage from the visiting King of Iraq, Faisal II, and Araz was fired from the newspaper.

Between 1957 and 1963, Araz worked in Yeni Sabah. In 1959, she published her book Anadolu Evliyaları ("Saints of Anatolia"), another religious work chronicling the lives of 50 saints. This book was a great commercial success and broke sales records. She published more religious books in the 1950s and 60s, and worked as a columnist in Yeni İstanbul, Milliyet and Güneş.

In 1973, Araz started writing TV plays. These plays were played by the duo of Yıldız Kenter and Şükran Güngör and portrayed women and men from different walks of life in their daily realities. The plays were dramas and the themes included limits placed upon women by the society, gender roles, marital disputes and generation gap. Emotional dialogues were balanced by comical dialogues. Her first full-length play, Bozkır Güzellemesi ("An Ode to the Steppe"), was staged by the state theatres of Turkey in 1974–75, as were her later plays, Öyle bir Nevcican (1979), Alaca Karanlık (1981), İmparatorun İki Oğlu (1983), Ballar Balını Buldum, Savaş Yorgunu Kadınlar ("War-Weary Women"). In 1987, she wrote the play Afife Jale on the life of the first Turkish actress, Afife Jale for which she won the Best Playwright Award from the Turkish Ministry of Culture. She won the Afife Jale Theatre Award and Avni Dilligil Theatre Award for her work.

After 1984, she prepared a show for women on TRT named Hanımlar Sizin İçin, which she wrote and presented. She wrote the script for the 1983 film İhtiras Fırtınası.

In 1993, she published Mustafa Kemal’le 1000 Gün, in which she portrayed the relationship between Mustafa Kemal Atatürk and Latife Uşşaki. She then wrote more books on Atatürk, publishing Mustafa Kemal'in Ankara'sı in 1994, Mustafa Kemal’in Devlet Paşası and Bir Zamanlar O da Çocuktu: Adı Mustafa.

In 2003, she was awarded the 2003 Burhan Felek Media Award for her work in journalism.

== Awards ==
- Best Playwright Award, Turkish Ministry of Culture
- Afife Jale Theatre Award
- Avni Dilligil Theatre Award
- 2003, Burhan Felek Media Award

== Legacy ==
In 2012, a documentary about Araz was made. The documentary, named Beyond Words, was directed by Jeyda Elsasser, grand daughter of her sister Vecihe Buyukaksoy.

== Personal life and death ==
Araz lived in an old people's home in her last years. She suffered from Alzheimer's disease, refused to see anybody and had reportedly lost a lot of weight. Araz died in 2009.
