= Necmettin Büyükkaya =

Kurdish activist (1943–1984)

- Born: 1943 village of Karahan (Dağbaşı), Siverek district of Şanlıurfa Province
- Died: January 24, 1984 (aged 40–41); Diyarbakır Prison
- Other name: Neco
- Known for: Kurdish activist and cadre of the Revolutionary Cultural Eastern Hearths in Turkey

Necmettin Büyükkaya also known as Neco (1943–1984) was a prominent Kurdish activist and cadre of the Revolutionary Cultural Eastern Hearths in Turkey who was tortured to death in prison.

== Biography ==
Büyükkaya was born in 1943 in the village of Karahan (Dağbaşı) in the Siverek district of Şanlıurfa Province to Kurdish parents and went on to study at the Istanbul University Faculty of Law after graduating high school in Diyarbakır. During his studies in Istanbul, he became a member of the Workers' Party and the Federation of Debate Clubs before becoming a prominent member of the Kurdish movement. He co-founded the Revolutionary Cultural Eastern Hearths together with other Kurdish intellectuals in 1969. After the 1971 military coup, he fled to Iraqi Kurdistan and became a member of the Kurdistan Democratic Party/North. In 1972, he went to Qamishli in Syria, and then Czechoslovakia and Sweden before returning to Turkey in 1975 after general amnesty was declared the previous year. In Turkey he continued his Kurdish activism until the 1980 coup d'état when he was jailed and tortured. On 24 January 1984, Büyükkaya was tortured to death at Diyarbakır Prison while on a hunger strike.

Letters and other writings of Büyükkaya were collected and published in Sweden in 1992 as the book "Kalemimden Sayfalar".
