= Fatma Hikmet İşmen =

Turkish politician and agricultural engineer

Senator of the Republic
- In office 5 June 1966 – 12 October 1975

Personal details
- Born: Fatma Hikmet; 1918 Ioannina, Kingdom of Greece
- Died: 9 May 2006 (aged 87–88) Istanbul, Turkey
- Resting place: Zincirlikuyu Cemetery
- Party: Workers Party of Turkey (TİP)
- Other political affiliations: Socialist Unity Party (SBP); Freedom and Solidarity Party (ÖDP)
- Relations: Ali Pasha of Ioannina (ancestor), Fikret İşmen Kaygı (sister)
- Parent: Husein Pasha (father)
- Education: Agricultural engineering, Ankara University
- Occupation: Agricultural engineer, politician

Fatma Hikmet İşmen (1918 – 9 May 2006) was a Greek-born Turkish agricultural engineer with a specialization in plant pathology, as well as a politician who served as a senator for the socialist Workers Party of Turkey from 1966 to 1975.

== Early life ==
Fatma Hikmet was born to an Albanian Muslim minority family in Ioannina, Greece in 1918. Her father, Husein Pasha, is claimed to be a descendant of the Albanian ruler Ali Pasha (1740–1822).

After the Greco-Turkish War, the family emigrated to Turkey within the frame of population exchange between Greece and Turkey agreed by the Lausanne Convention in 1923. They settled in Beşiktaş, Istanbul. Due to the father's occupation as an army officer, the family migrated to Tokat and Adapazarı.

Fatma Hikmet completed her primary and secondary education in Istanbul. She attended the Arnavutköy American High School for Girls, before moving to Istanbul Girls High School, finishing in 1933. She then studied agricultural engineering at Ankara University's Faculty of Agriculture, graduating in 1937. She attended courses in England and obtained a doctoral degree in Canada. She became a specialist in plant diseases.

After the Surname Law in 1934, she and her older sister Fikret adopted the family name "İşmen".

== Scientist ==
İşmen was employed by the Ministry of Agriculture, and served in the Institute of Pest Control (Turkish: Zirai Mücadele Enstitüsü) in Ankara, İzmir, and from 1945 on in Istanbul. She conducted research work as assistant, chief assistant and specialist between 1940 and 1966.

== Politician ==
Encouraged by Adnan Cemgil, whose son was a militant of an armed underground far-left movement, İşmen joined the Workers Party of Turkey (Turkish: Türkiye İşçi Partisi, TİP) in 1964. On 5 June 1966, she entered the Senate of the Republic representing Kocaeli electoral district as the only senator of TİP, which was present in the Turkish Grand National Assembly with 15 seats won in the 1965 general elections.

In her first speech in the senate, she accused the Directorate of Religious Affairs of fueling the discrimination of Alawites by the Sunni Islam that sparked a long-lasting controversy in the senate with Justice Party majority. Her parliamentary works were focused on policies of education, agriculture and animal husbandry.

The TİP was banned after the 1971 Turkish military memorandum. She remained alone as socialist representative in the legislature. She resigned after nine years in the senate on 12 October 1975 stating tiredness.

In 1976, she published her autobiography about her time in the Senate under the title Parlamentoda 9 yıl: TİP Senatörü Olarak 1966 – 1975 Dönemi Parlamento Çalışmaları ("9 Years in the Parliament: Parliamentary Works as the Senator of TİP During the Term 1966 – 1975").

In 1991, she co-founded the Socialist Unity Party (Turkish: Sosyalist Birlik Partisi, SBP), and in 1994, she was among the founders of the Freedom and Solidarity Party (Turkish: Özgürlük ve Dayanışma Partisi, ÖDP). She served in the boards of these political parties.

== Later years and death ==
She was the co-founder and a member of the board of trustees of the "Tarih Vakfı" ("The History Foundation"). In 1992, the foundation awarded in her honor the "Fatma Hikmet İşmen Prize for Supporting Research on Marxism" (Turkish: Fatma Hikmet İşmen Marksist Araştırmaları Destekleme Ödülü).

Fatma Hikmet İşmen died in Istanbul on 9 May 2006. Two days later, she was buried at Zincirlikuyu Cemetery following the religious ceremony held at Şişli Mosque. The funeral attendees sang the left-wing anthem "The Internationale". She was survived by her sister Fikret İşmen Kaygı. She was never married due to her anti-marriage views.
