= Atatürk Museum, Şişli =

Atatürk Museum
- Atatürk Müzesi
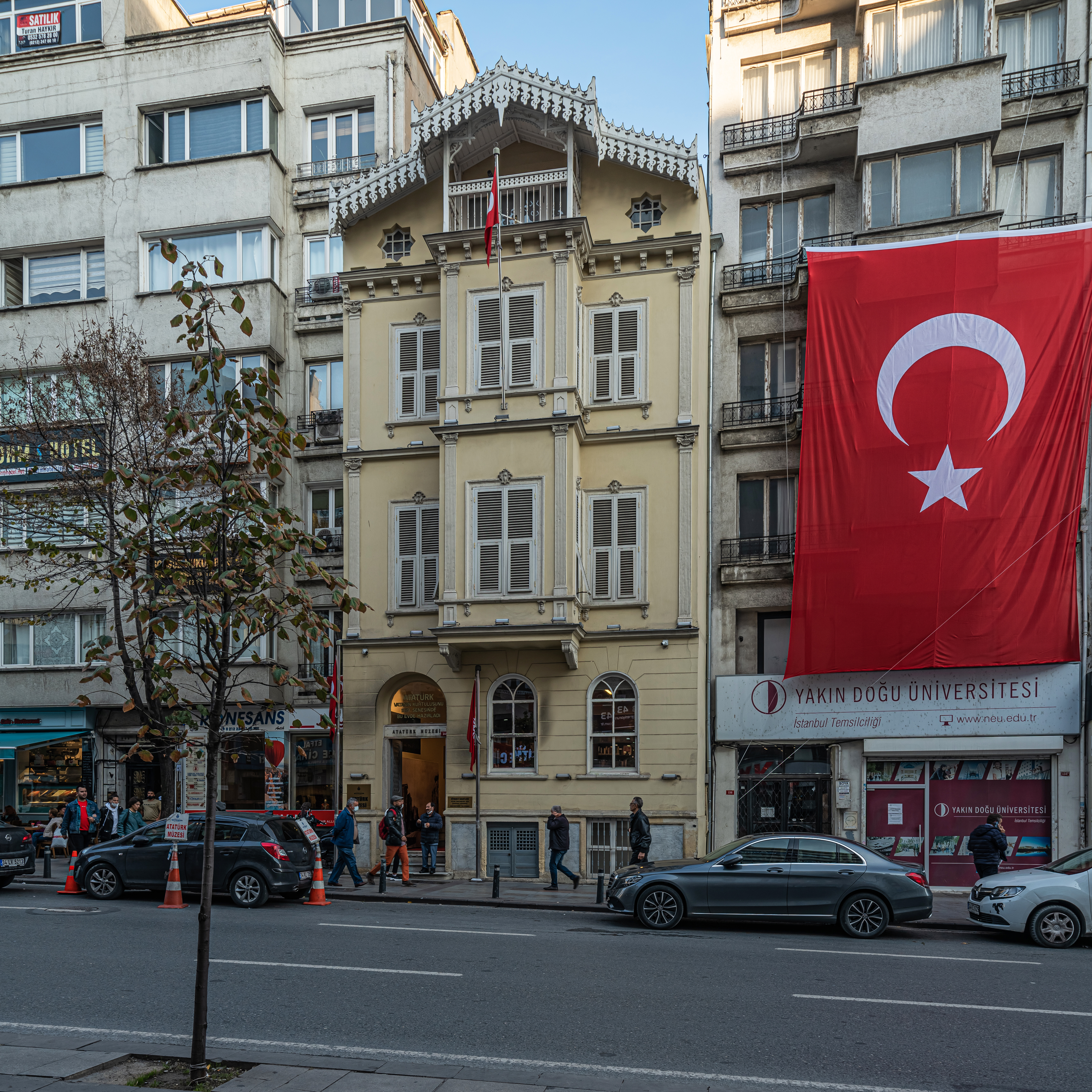
- Atatürk Museum
- Established: 1942
- Location: Şişli, Istanbul, Turkey
- Coordinates: 41.056397°N 28.987212°E
- Type: National, Biographical

Atatürk Museum (Turkish: Atatürk Müzesi) is a historic house museum dedicated to the life of Mustafa Kemal Atatürk, the first president of the Republic of Turkey. It is located in the district of Şişli, on the European side of Istanbul, Turkey.

It is located in a three-storey house built in 1908. Mustafa Kemal rented the house after returning from the Syrian Front and lived there with his mother Zübeyde, sister Makbule and adopted son Abdurrahim. He lived there until 16 May 1919, the day he sailed on the ship Bandırma to Samsun, on his way to the headquarters of the Ninth Army Troops Inspectorate in Erzurum. The house was purchased in 1928 by the Municipality of Istanbul and some of Atatürk's personal belongings were stored there. The house was converted to a museum, opening to visitors on 15 June 1942 as Atatürk Revolution Museum.

The museum houses personal belongings of Atatürk like clothes and collections, other than historical documents, photographs and paintings of his lifetime.

== See also ==
- Atatürk Museums in Turkey
