= Socialist Revolution Party (Turkey) =

Socialist Revolution Party Sosyalist Devrim Partisi
- President: Mehmet Ali Aybar
- Founder: Canan Bıçakçı
- Founded: 30 May 1975
- Dissolved: 1995
- Headquarters: Ankara, Turkey
- Ideology: Democratic socialism
- Political position: Left-wing

Socialist Revolution Party (Turkish: Sosyalist Devrim Partisi) was a political party in Turkey.

The party was founded by Mehmet Ali Aybar, the former chairman of Workers Party of Turkey (TIP). Aybar was a champion of a policy known as "smiling socialism" which was rejected among most of the other Marxists. So in 1970, he lost his chair to Behice Boran. In 1971 TİP was banned by the 33rd government of Turkey after 1971 Turkish military memorandum. Although TİP was reestablished, Aybar did not participate and he founded another party named the Socialist Party on 30 May 1975 which later on was renamed the Socialist Revolution Party (SDP). Among the 50 carter members some of the notable names were Cenan Bıçakçı, Uğur Cankoçak and Kemal Nebioğlu. In the 3rd art. of the party constitution it reads "People are not for socialism, but socialism is for people."

The blue collar workers made up 2/3 of the party staff. No person was to be the chairperson of the party for more than one term. So Aybar left his seat to Cenan Bıçakçı, a former unionist. However, in 1980 following 1980 Turkish coup, the party was closed by the military rule just like the other political parties. After the military term, Turkey returned to democracy, and the party was opened for the second time. In the elections, however, the party was unable to gain any seat in the parliament or in the local government and in 1995 it dissolved itself.
