= Yurt ve Dünya =

Turkish sociology and political magazine (1941–1944; 1977–1980)

- Categories: Sociology magazine (1941–1944); Political magazine (1977–1980)
- Frequency: Monthly
- Founded: 1941
- First issue: January 1941
- Final issue: March 1980
- Country: Turkey
- Based in: Ankara (1941–1944); Istanbul (1977–1980)
- Language: Turkish

Yurt ve Dünya (transl. Homeland and the World) was a sociological and political magazine which was headquartered first in Ankara and then in Istanbul, Turkey. It was first published in the period between 1941 and 1944 and then between 1977 and 1980. It is known for its well-known editors and contributors, including Sabahattin Ali, Niyazi Berkes, Behice Boran and Pertev Naili Boratav.

== History and profile ==
Yurt ve Dünya was started by Adnan Cemgil and Niyazi Berkes as a monthly in Ankara in 1941, and its first issue appeared in January that year. Its directors included Adnan Cemgil, Pertev Naili Boratav and Behice Boran. The latter was also its founding editor-in-chief.

Yurt ve Dünya focused on sociological analyses of the rural society following the views of Turkish sociologist Ziya Gökalp and French sociologist Pierre Guillaume Frédéric le Play. One of the contributors to articles about rural sociology was Mediha Esenel. Yurt ve Dünya also featured poems, short stories and critical articles on film industry in Turkey.

Yurt ve Dünya was banned by the Turkish authorities in March 1944 due to its alleged leftist leaning without any legal process. Total number of the contributors of Yurt ve Dünya in the first period was nearly sixty-seven. Most of them were academics at Ankara University. It produced a total of forty-two issues during its run. Behice Boran argued in an interview with the Turkish journalist Uğur Mumcu in 1986 that her articles led to the government pressure on and the closure of both Adımlar and Yurt ve Dünya in 1944.

In 1977 Yurt ve Dünya was restarted in Istanbul under the ownership of Behice Boran and was affiliated with Workers' Party of Turkey. It folded in March 1980 after producing 20 issues.

Some issues of the magazine are archived by TUSTAV.
