= Sera Kadıgil =

Turkish politician and lawyer

Sera Kadıgil MP
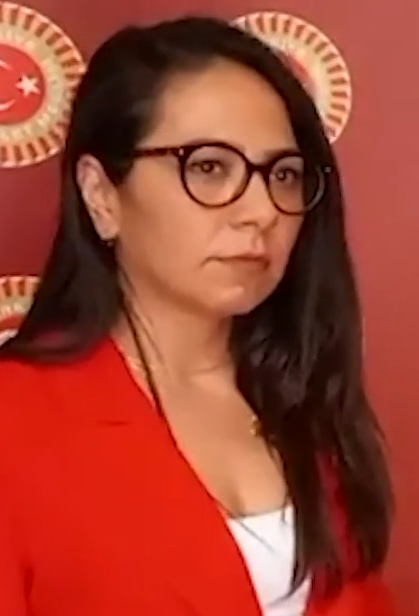

Spokesperson of Workers' Party of Turkey
- Incumbent
- Assumed office 2021

Member of the Grand National Assembly
- Incumbent
- Assumed office 7 July 2018
- Constituency: İstanbul (I) (2018, 2023)

Personal details
- Born: 29 November 1984 (age 41) Istanbul, Turkey
- Party: Workers' Party of Turkey (2021–present)
- Other political affiliations: Republican People's Party (2010–2021)
- Spouse: Tolga Sütlü (m. 2017)
- Education: Istanbul University Faculty of Law
- Occupation: Politician, lawyer

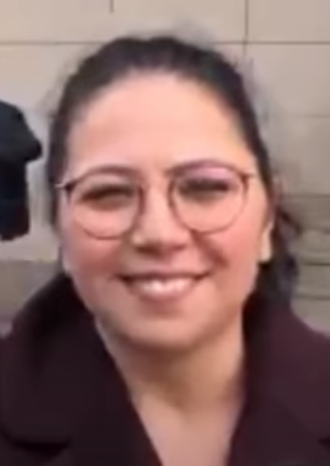
Sera Kadıgil in 2019

Saliha Sera Kadıgil (born 29 November 1984) is a Turkish politician and lawyer. She has served as a member of the Grand National Assembly of Turkey in its 27th legislative term since 2018. Initially a member of CHP, she later resigned and joined the Workers' Party of Turkey in 2021.

== Early life and education ==
After graduating from Vefa High School in 2003, she graduated from Istanbul University Faculty of Law in 2007. She completed her master's degree in private law at the same university in 2010 and wrote her master's thesis on cinema works after her research at Queen Mary University of London. She is pursuing a doctorate at Istanbul University.

== Career ==
Kadıgil, who has been a member of the Istanbul Bar Association Animal Rights Commission Executive Board since 2008, has worked as a manager in many non-governmental organizations related to animal rights. She was a member of the CHP Women's Branch Central Board of Directors and served as a party council member for 3 terms. She is a member of the TBMM Equal Opportunities Committee for Women and Men. She resigned from CHP on Friday, 25 June 2021, and joined the Workers' Party of Turkey (TİP). She staged a protest against Fuat Oktay during a parliamentary budget hearing in 2021, where she played two songs, "Yalan" (Lie) and "Palavra palavra", through a loudspeaker. She received an official reprimand for the protest.

== Personal life ==
She has been married to Tolga Sütlü since 2017.
