= Mihri Belli =

Turkish socialist revolutionary

- Born: December 1915; Silivri, Ottoman Empire
- Died: August 16, 2011 (aged 95); Istanbul
- Resting place: Feriköy Cemetery, Istanbul
- Education: Economics
- Alma mater: Robert College, University of Mississippi
- Occupation: Politician
- Known for: His thesis "National Democratic Revolution"
- Political party: Communist Party of Turkey (TKP), Workers Party of Turkey (TİP), Labour Party of Turkey (TEP); Freedom and Solidarity Party (ÖDP), Socialist Democracy Party (SDP); Workers' Socialist Party (İSP)

Mihri Belli (December 1915 – 16 August 2011) was a prominent leader of the socialist movement in Turkey. He fought for the communist side in the Greek Civil War.

Belli was repeatedly prosecuted and sentenced to prison for his political views, and was altogether imprisoned for 11 years, and forced into exile for another 18.

Belli wrote several influential books on the Turkish left and was, for many years, a source of inspiration for leftist Turkish youths.

== Early life ==
Belli was born in 1916 in Silivri, then in the Ottoman Empire, to Mahmut Hayrettin Bey, later a prominent leader of the Turkish War of Independence in Urfa.

He was educated at Robert College in Istanbul, and in 1936 went on to study economics at the University of Mississippi in the United States. There he was introduced to Marxist thought and revolutionary action. He took part in the activities of the civil rights movement in Mississippi.

== Return to Turkey ==
Belli returned to Turkey in 1940, where he joined the outlawed Communist Party of Turkey (TKP).

Turkey was at the time under a one-party regime. The government, under the influence of the German advances in the initial years of World War II, had abandoned its policy of friendship with the USSR. The only opposition party in Turkey in these days was the underground TKP. Belli, after returning to Turkey, contacted the outlawed party via his elementary-school friend David Nea, who was the party secretary for Istanbul at the time. Belli became a member of the central committee of the TKP in 1942.

He served as assistant professor with professor Fritz Neumark at the Faculty of Economics of Istanbul University in the years 1943–1944. There he was among the founders and organizers of the İlerici Gençler Birliği (Progressive Youth Union). In 1944 he was arrested for these activities and sentenced to two years imprisonment and exile.

== Greek Civil War ==
Belli left Turkey in 1946, and joined the Greek Civil War as a guerrilla fighter on the communist side. He rose to the rank of lieutenant-colonel in the Democratic Army of Greece. He was wounded twice in battle, and was treated in Bulgaria and the USSR.

In 1950 he was imprisoned in Turkey for a short while for entry without a passport and illegal possession of a handgun. Shortly after his release, he was imprisoned again in 1951 in a wave of TKP arrests. This time he was sentenced to seven years in prison and two years and four months of forced relocation.

A documentary about his time in Greece, entitled "Καπετάν Κεμάλ, ο σύντροφος" ("Captain Kemal, A Comrade"; Turkish title "Kaptan Kemal, Bir Yoldaş") was made by the prominent Greek filmmaker Fotos Lamprinos.

== Turkish revolutionary movement ==
During the 1960s, Belli could write and speak without having to use an alias. Nevertheless, also in that period he served prison time for various articles and speeches. He was part of the group who published the revolutionary magazines Türk Solu and Aydınlık Sosyalist Dergi. Expelled from the TKP, he joined the newly formed Workers Party of Turkey (TİP). At this time, he developed his well-known thesis for Turkey known as Milli Demokratik Devrim (National Democratic Revolution), abbreviated MDD. In 1964 Mihri Belli joined weekly Yön magazine.

With his friends, Belli contacted Deniz Gezmiş and Mahir Çayan, who were at the time leaders of the youth movement amassing popular support. The ideas of MDD quickly gained prominence among the leftist youth movement; it became the main theoretical framework for most of the leftist groups that flourished in Turkey in that period and played a key role in the '68 movement in Turkey, giving it a Marxist and revolutionary characteristic.

Mihri Belli left Turkey after the 1971 military coup to avoid arrest, and was for a while a guest of the Palestine Liberation Organization. He returned to Turkey briefly, en route to Western Europe. There he stayed for a while and helped with the magazine Yurtsever (Patriot). He returned to Turkey when the centre-left Republican People's Party (CHP) under Bülent Ecevit emerged as the largest party in the 1973 elections.

After the amnesty of 1974, he founded the Labour Party of Turkey (TEP) in 1975. Immediately after the founding of the party, the prosecutor's office of the Martial Law Court took notice and demanded the removal of the word Kurd from the party program and other documents. The Constitutional Court banned the TEP for demanding equal rights for Kurds.

In 1979, Belli faced an assassination attempt in which he was severely injured. After the 1980 military coup, he left for the Middle East. From there he moved to Sweden, where he followed the Kurdish movement closely until he returned to Turkey in 1992. In 1997 he met with Abdullah Öcalan, and they came to the common conclusion that a solution to the Kurdish issue under the umbrella of a unitarian state, instead of a federative solution, was possible on the basis of equality and voluntary union. The report of this meeting was later published in book form.

In 1996 Belli participated in the founding of the Freedom and Solidarity Party (ÖDP), and that of the Socialist Democracy Party (SDP) in 2002. He was a candidate for member of parliament for Istanbul in the 2002 elections.

In 2005, the portraits Belli had made 50 years earlier, while in prison, were presented in an exhibition "Lines From Prison". Together with several other founding members he resigned from the SDP in 2007 and took part in the 2008 founding of the Workers' Socialist Party (İşçilerin Sosyalist Partisi), better known by the shortened name Socialist Party (Sosyalist Parti), along with others who left.

== Death ==
Mihri Belli died in his home in Istanbul from respiratory distress on 16 August 2011. He was laid to rest in Feriköy Cemetery following a religious funeral service held at Şişli Mosque.

He was an atheist.
