= Cemal Reşit Rey Concert Hall =

Concert hall in Istanbul, Turkey

- Cemal Reşit Rey Konser Salonu
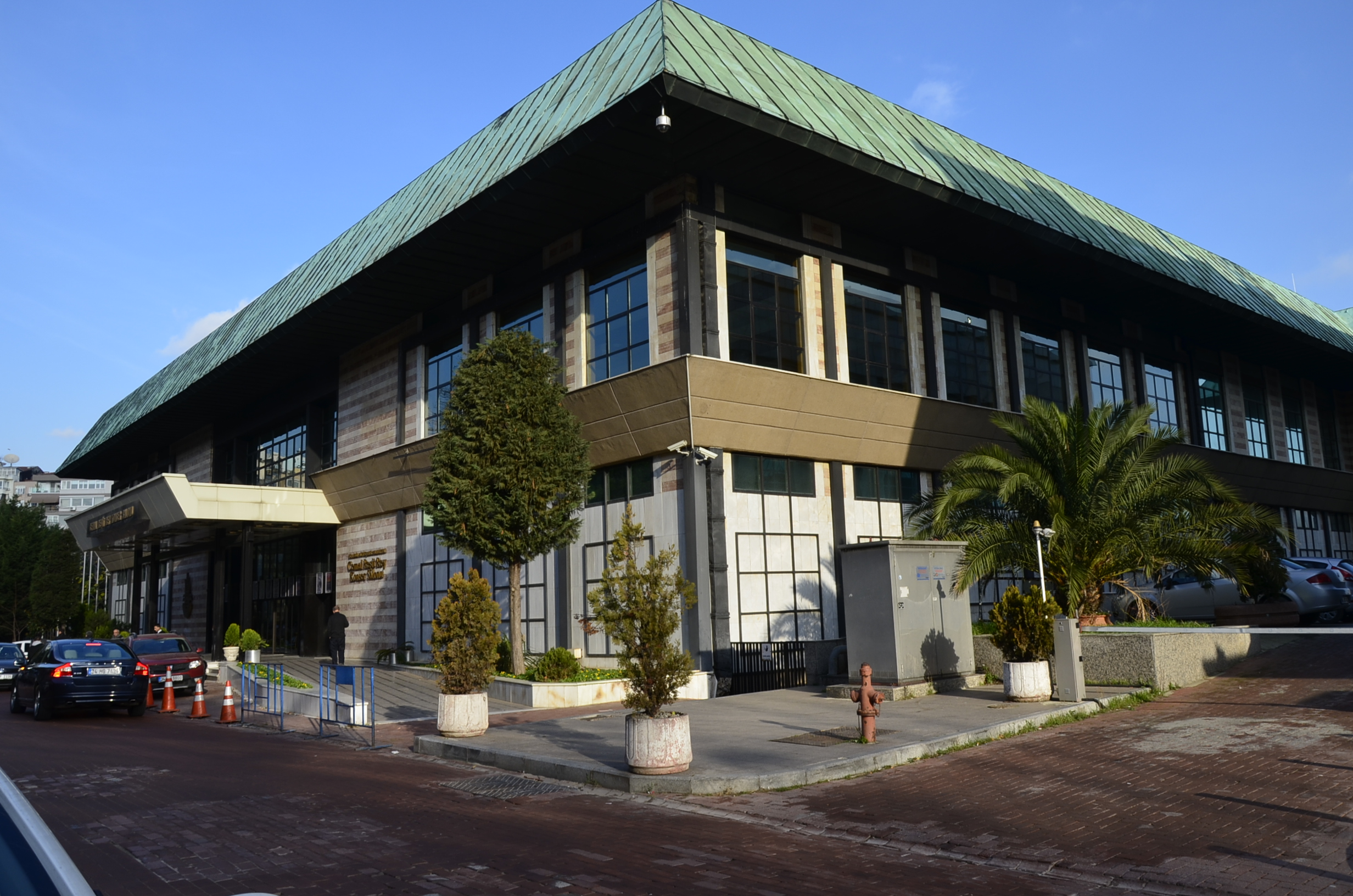
- Cemal Reşit Rey Concert Hall.

- Location within Istanbul

General information
- Location: Harbiye, Şişli, Dar’ül Bedayi Cad. 31, Istanbul, Turkey
- Coordinates: 41°02′53″N 28°59′24″E
- Opened: March 1989; 37 years ago
- Client: Kültür A.Ş.
- Owner: Istanbul Metropolitan Municipality

Other information
- Seating capacity: 860

The Cemal Reşit Rey Concert Hall (Turkish: Cemal Reşit Rey Konser Salonu) is a concert hall located in the Harbiye neighbourhood of Istanbul, Turkey. It is one of the country's major concert halls, being the first one designed for classical music. Named after the Turkish composer Cemal Reşit Rey (1904–1985), the hall is owned by the Metropolitan Municipality of Istanbul and operated by its subsidiary, the Kültür company. Opened in March 1989, it has a seating capacity of 860.

The concert hall hosts concerts, ballet and dance performances every year between October and May. It is also home to CRR Istanbul Symphony Orchestra, Turkish Musical Ensemble, CRR Big Band Jazz and CRR Instrumental Soloists.

The concert hall underwent an overhaul of its stage and auditorium acoustics, foyer and auditorium design, and heating and air conditioning facilities beginning in August 2007. The renovation works cost around ₺4 million (approx. US$3 million at that time), and were completed before the start of the new concert season.

== See also ==
- Cemil Topuzlu Open-Air Theatre
- Ataturk Cultural Center
- List of concert halls
