= Kemal Bilbaşar =

Turkish writer (1910–1983)

- Born: 1910; Çanakkale
- Died: 21 January 1983 (aged 73); Istanbul
- Education: Sofia University
- Occupation: Writer
- Writing career
- Period: Cumhuriyet dönemi
- Notable awards: Turkish Language Institution Novel Award, May Novel Award

Kemal Bilbaşar (born 1910, Çanakkale – 21 January 1983, Istanbul), was a Turkish writer.

== Biography ==
He was born in Çanakkale. His father is Hüsnü Naim Efendi, a police chief commissioner from the Caucasus, and his mother is Nuriye Hanım, who is an immigrant from Bulgaria. Naim Efendi, who graduated from Sofia University, went to Thessaloniki as the police chief after his appointment came out after serving in Çanakkale for a while. Upon the death of Naim Efendi, who worked here for a while, the family migrated to Çanakkale, his previous place of duty. The family had to leave here in 1915 after the Çanakkale front was also bombarded during World War I.

Bilbaşar was among the contributors of the literary magazine Adımlar between 1943 and 1944.

== Bibliography ==
=== Story ===
- Anadolu'dan Hikayeler - 1939
- Cevizli Bahçe - 1941
- Pembe Kurt - 1953
- Üç Bulutlu Hikayeler - 1956
- Irgatların Öfkesi - 1971
- Pazarlık – 1944
- Köyden Kentten – 1961

=== Novel ===
- Denizin Çağırışı – 1943
- Ay Tutulduğu Gece – 1961
- Cemo – 1966
- Memo – 1970
- Yeşil Gölge – 1970
- Yonca Kız – 1971
- Başka Olur Ağaların Düğünü – 1972
- Kölelik Dönemeci – 1977
- Bedoş – 1980
- Zühre Ninem – 1981
