= Safiye Erol =

Turkish novelist (1902-1964)

- Born: Safiye; 2 January 1902; Uzunköprü, Edirne, Ottoman Empire
- Died: 7 October 1964 (aged 62); Istanbul, Turkey
- Resting place: Karacaahmet Cemetery
- Education: Philosophy, literature
- Alma mater: Marburg University; Ludwig-Maximilians-Universität München
- Occupation: Writer
- Writing career
- Pen name: "Sami", "Diara"
- Language: Turkish
- Genre: Novel
- Website: safiyeerol.org/index.php

Safiye Erol (2 January 1902 – 7 October 1964) was a Turkish novelist. She is one of the writers of the Republican Era.

== Early life ==
Safiye Erol was born to Sami and Emine İkbal in Uzunköprü town of Edirne, then Ottoman Empire, on 2 January 1902. Her father was a clerk in the Municipality of Uzunköprü, and her mother was a member of the Bektashi Order lodge in Keşan. The family moved to Üsküdar, Istanbul in 1906.

She was schooled in Üsküdar for primary education. Later, she attended the French Missionary School. Then, she entered the Deutsche Schule Istanbul for secondary education.

In 1917, she went to Germany through a scholarship granted by the "German-Turkish Friendship Association". She completed her secondary education at the Private Falkanplatz High School in Lübeck in 1919. Due to some events in Germany, she returned home. In 1921, she went to Germany again, and enrolled in Marburg University, but moved to the Ludwig-Maximilians-Universität München in 1923 to continue her education in philosophy and literature. In 1926, she obtained a Ph.D. degree with the thesis Die Pflanzennamen in der altarabischen Poesie, about the plant names in the Arabian language poetry. She returned to Istanbul the next year.

== Writing career ==
She told in her memoirs that "one of her professors in Germany said that she would be the Selma Lagerlöf of the Turks in the future" as she likes writing very much.

In the beginning of her writing career, she used the pen names "Sami" for articles and translations, as well as "Dilara" for short stories. She wrote short stories and made translations for the magazines such as Milli Mecmua ("National Magazine") and Her Ay ("Every Month"). Her first novel Kadıköyü'nün Romanı was serialized in the newspaper Vakit in 1935, which was published as a book in 1938. Her next novel Ülker Fırtınası was published in 1944 after it appeared in as a serial in the daily Cumhuriyet in 1938. Her favorite novel was the 1946-published Ciğerdelen, Turkish for Štúrovo on the River Danube. She translated the 1914-novel Kejsarn av Portugallien of Swedish Selma Lagerlöf (1858–1940) as Portugaliye İmparatoriçesi (1941) and German Friedrich de la Motte Fouqué's (1777–1843) 1811-novel Undine as Su Kızı (1945). In 1951, her three-part philosophical review of the Sufi thinker Kenan Rıfai was published in Kenan Rıfai ve Yirminci Asrın Işığında Müslümanlık ("Kenan Riffai and Islam in the Light of the Twentieth Century"). Her last novel Dinyeri Papazı was serialized in the daily Tercüman in 1955. During the Islamic fasting month of Ramadan in 1962, she wrote the serial Çölde Biten Rahmet Ağacı in the newspaper Yeni Istanbul, which narrated the phases of the life of Muhammad in the desert. Many articles of her published in various newspapers and magazines were collected in a book titled Makaleler in 2002. Her short stories were published post-mortem in the book Leylak Mevsimi in 2010.

== Private life ==
She married in 1931. She served as city councilor in 1943. In her later years from 1961 on, she was active in cultural events as a member of the "Development and Culture Association of Üsküdar".

Safiye Erol died at the age of 62 in Istanbul on 7 October 1964, and was buried at the Karacaahmet Cemetery.

== Works ==
1. Erol, Safiye (30 May 2002) [2002]. Makaleler (in Turkish) (1st ed.). Kubbealtı Neşriyat. p. 606. ISBN 975-766-381-6.
2. Araz, Nezihe; Sofi Huri; Samiha Ayverdi; Safiye Erol (17 October 2016). Mektuplar 5 (in Turkish) (1st ed.). Kubbealtı Neşriyat. p. 168. ISBN 978-605-475-025-2.
3. Erol, Safiye (10 October 2017) [2010]. Leylak Mevsimi (in Turkish) (3rd ed.). Kubbealtı Neşriyat. p. 95. ISBN 978-975-644-474-0.
4. Erol, Safiye (24 April 2018) [1946]. Ciğerdelen (in Turkish) (16th ed.). Kubbealtı Neşriyat. p. 261. ISBN 978-975-766-354-6.
5. Erol, Safiye (25 September 2019) [1944]. Ülker Fırtınası (in Turkish) (7th ed.). Kubbealtı Neşriyat. p. 216. ISBN 978-975-766-379-9.
6. Erol, Safiye (16 October 2019). Dineyri Papazı (in Turkish) (5th ed.). Kubbealtı Neşriyat. p. 333. ISBN 978-975-766-378-2.
7. Erol, Safiye (16 October 2019) [1938]. Kadıköyü'nün Romanı (in Turkish) (7th ed.). Kubbealtı Neşriyat. p. 264. ISBN 978-975-766-374-4.
8. Erol, Safiye (21 February 2020). Çölde Biten Rahmet Ağacı (in Turkish) (7th ed.). Kubbealtı Neşriyat. p. 112. ISBN 978-975-766-373-7.
