= Barış Atay =

Turkish actor and politician

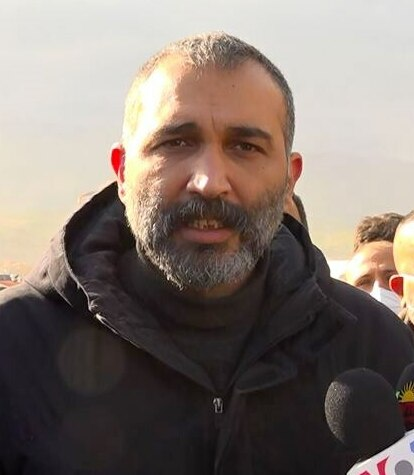
- Atay in April 2023

Member of the Grand National Assembly
- In office 6 July 2018 – 7 April 2023
- Constituency: Hatay (2018)

Personal details
- Born: Barış Atay Mengüllüoğlu; 22 September 1981 (age 44) Wilhelmshaven, West Germany
- Party: TİP
- Spouse: Beste Sultan Kasapoğulları (m. 2013)
- Education: Yeditepe University
- Occupation: Actor, politician

Barış Atay Mengüllüoğlu (born 22 September 1981) is a Turkish actor and a politician of the Workers' Party of Turkey (TİP).

== Early life and education ==
He was interested in theatre plays since he was ten years old and acted in multiple shows during his early life. He attended primary and secondary school in Antakya and studied Theater at the Yeditepe University in Istanbul, from where he graduated in 2009.

== Professional career ==
He played in several Turkish TV series and movies and together with friends he established the Emek Sahnesi Theater in 2011. He is an outspoken critic of Recep Tayyip Erdoğan's policies and the application of the rule of law in Turkey. He acted in the theater play "Only a Dictator" (Turkish: Sadece Diktatör), which was widely viewed as a parody of Erdoğan. The play was subsequently prohibited to be performed in the Kadiköy district where the Emek Sahnesi Theater is located. As a reaction to this ban, he published the piece in the internet and the play was then shown in the Maxim Gorki Theater in Berlin.

== Political career ==
He was a strong supporter of the Gezi Park protests and as such was criticized by Melih Gökçek from the governing party, the Justice and Development Party (AKP. In November 2013, he was briefly detained due to suspected links to RedHack, a Turkish hacker group supportive of the Gezi Park protests, but released after a week.

In May 2018, he was announced as a candidate of the Peoples Democratic Party (HDP) for the parliamentary elections in 2018 in which he was elected as a representative of the Hatay province. In 2018, he and Erkan Baş announced their resignation from the HDP and together joined the Workers' Party of Turkey (TİP), becoming their only representatives in the Parliament.

=== Controversies ===
In June 2020, he claimed a car of the TIP he was using was sabotaged by his political opponents in order to cause an accident. After he demanded clarification in a case in which a sergeant was accused of the rape of the Kurdish 18 year old student İpek Er, but released from custody, he drew harsh criticism on him by the Turkish Minister of the Interior Süleyman Soylu, who blamed him of being a sympathizer of the Kurdistan Workers' Party (PKK) and the People's Liberation Party/Front (DHKP-C) and advised him "don't get caught". The following night, he claimed that he was attacked by five individuals, causing him to stay the night in the hospital. For the assault, he blamed Soylu.
