= Pertev Naili Boratav =

Turkish folklorist and researcher of folk literature

Pertev Naili Boratav, born Mustafa Pertev (September 2, 1907 – March 16, 1998) was a Turkish folklorist and researcher of folk literature. He has been characterized as 'the founding father of Turkish folkloristics during the Republic'.

== Life ==
Pertev Naili Boratav was born in 1907 in Darıdere - today known as Zlatograd, in Bulgaria, but then a town in the Sanjak of Gümülcine in the Ottoman Empire. He was educated at Istanbul High School before enrolling at Istanbul University in 1927, graduating from the Turkish Language and Literature Department in 1930. In 1931-32 he worked as an assistant to the historian Mehmet Fuat Koprulu. In the period between 1941 and 1944 he was among the directors of a monthly sociology journal entitled Yurt ve Dünya based in Ankara. It was banned in 1944 due to its communist leaning. Boratav was also a contributor to Adımlar, another magazine, in 1943 and 1944. After establishing Turkey's first Department of Folk Literature in 1946, Boratav was one of three professors who in 1947 were accused of promoting socialism and undermining nationalism. Though eventually acquitted in his 1948 trial, his department was closed and he was forced to move to Paris in 1952. He died in Paris in 1998.

Boratav reported that he acquired his basic knowledge on folklore, literature and sociology from the courses of his high school teacher Hilmi Ziya Ülken. A student of Koprulu and Georges Dumézil, Boratav was also influenced by the writings of Arnold Van Gennep. He was pioneering in giving attention to performative aspects of folklore. The classification of Turkish folktales, which he undertook with Wolfram Eberhard, modified the comparative approach of Antti Aarne, by insisting that detailed classification of folktales of a particular culture needed to precede attempts at cross-cultural research.

== Works ==
- Köroğlu destanı [The Köroğlu epic], 1931
- Halk hikâyeleri ve halk hikâyeciliği [Folk Narratives and Folk Narration], 1946
- (with Wolfram Eberhard) Typen türkischer Volksmärchen [Types of the Turkish Folktale], 1953
- Les histoires d'ours en Anatolie [The Bear Stories of Anatolia], 1955
- Türkische Volksmärchen [Turkish Folk Tales], 1967
