= Death of İpek Er =

2020 incident in Turkey

İpek Er
- Born: 20 April 2002; Batman, Turkey
- Died: 18 August 2020 (aged 18); Kurtalan, Turkey
- Cause of death: Complications from a suicide attempt
- Occupation: Student
- Known for: Being drugged and raped by a member of the Turkish military.

İpek Er was an 18-year-old student from Batman who died on 18 August 2020 following a suicide attempt on 16 July. She claimed that she had been drugged and raped by Musa Orhan, a specialized sergeant in the Turkish army, and that he had done so before and that she could complain, but he would not be harmed by it. Questioned by the authorities, he initially denied any wrongdoing, but after a forensic investigation he alleged that he had been intoxicated. Text messages in which he claimed to have raped Er repeatedly were circulated on social media.

== Events ==
Er's family notified the police when she went missing on 24 June. She was found on 3 July in a house in Kurtalan, Siirt. Her family filed a criminal complaint against Orhan with the Siirt prosecutor's office on 7 July, stating that he had raped and abducted Er. According to her family, she had told him that she could not return home after the rape unless he married her. He reportedly sent her to a cousin of his in Izmir and said they would marry soon, but then turned off his phone so he could not be contacted. An investigation was begun on 10 July, together with a request that he be dismissed from the military. On 16 July, Er attempted to kill herself with her father's rifle. She survived but was badly injured and subsequently transferred to a hospital in Batman.

=== Death ===
On 18 August 2020, Er died after twenty days in the Batman hospital. Following her death, several organizations demanded the arrest of Orhan.

== Legal prosecution ==
Following Er's suicide attempt, a campaign demanding the arrest of Orhan began in Turkish society and women's organizations. The next day, 17 July, Orhan was detained by Turkish authorities and questioned by a judge. After a week, the court ordered Orhan's release pending trial on the grounds that there was no flight risk. The decision was appealed by both the Siirt Bar Association and the public prosecutor. Their objections were not successful. On 27 July, a criminal sexual misconduct investigation of Orhan was begun. On 1 September, the Ministry of the Interior announced that Orhan had been dismissed from the military.

The Human Rights Foundation of Turkey reported that Orhan's trial began on 16 October. Orhan attended court by video call from Ankara and several lawyers and potential observers were not allowed into the courtroom due to COVID-19 pandemic restrictions. The court postponed further deliberations until 25 February 2021. On 25 February, Orhan didn't attend the hearing in person but over a video conference system and reserved the right to remain silent. The mother of İpek demanded his arrest, a request which was dismissed. In December 2021, a Court in Siirt sentenced Orhan to a prison term of 10 years, but the court did not order his arrest.

== Reactions ==
=== Political ===
Feleknas Uca, an MP of the Peoples' Democratic Party (HDP) for Batman, unsuccessfully demanded an explanation from the Ministry of Justice for the release of Orhan despite the existence of enough evidence for prosecution. Saruhan Oluç alleged that Musa Orhan's protection by the Government is an other example of the systematic oppression of the Kurdish people while Bariş Atay also demanded a clarification of the release, drawing harsh criticism from Minister of the Interior Süleyman Soylu, who accused him of being a sympathizer to the Kurdistan Workers' Party (PKK) and the People's Liberation Party-Front (DHKP-C), advising him "don't get caught". The following night, Atay claimed that he had been hospitalized after an attack by five individuals. He blamed Soylu for the assault. Soylu accused the HDP and PKK of bringing up the issue in order to hide their own actions from the public. Also the women's branch of the HDP demanded the arrest of Musa Orhan.

=== Society ===
Against the release of Musa Orhan, thousands of posts were made on social media. The Women are stronger together platform and the University Women assemblies organized protests in Istanbul and Izmir on the 27 August 2020. The Turkish actress Ezgi Mola was prosecuted for a tweet condemning Orhan's release in which she called Orhan a rapist, with the prosecution asking for up to 2 years and 4 months imprisonment. In May 2022, she was sentenced to a fine of several hundred dollars for her tweet. The trial against Mola lead to a wave of solidarity for her by several prominent personalities from the Turkish society. Hazal Kaya had defended her in a tweet, which then lead to another trial against Kaya in which the prosecution demanded 2 years and 4 months imprisonment for having insulted Musa Orhan. Farah Zeynep Abdullah was sentenced to pay a fine of 1300 Turkish liras for having insulted the Turkish sergeant. After Orhan was not imprisoned in December 2021, human rights activist Eren Keskin deemed the Turkish judiciary to hold the Wolf Salute of the Grey Wolves and a uniform to be superior to International law.

== See also ==
- List of solved missing person cases (2020s)
