= Sadun Aren =

Turkish academic and politician (1922–2008)

- Born: 19 April 1922; Erzurum, Ottoman Empire
- Died: 8 March 2008 (aged 85); Ankara, Turkey
- Resting place: Ankara
- Education: Ankara University
- Spouse: Munise Aren
- Scientific career
- Fields: Sociology; Political science
- Workplaces: Ankara University

Sadun Aren (19 March 1922 – 8 March 2008) was a Turkish academic and politician. He was one of the cofounders of Workers' Party of Turkey and of the leading figures of socialist movement in Turkey.

== Early life and education ==
Aren was born on 19 March 1922 in Erzurum. His father was a civil servant, and his mother was a housewife who died when Sadun Aren was a child. Due to his father's frequent appointments he completed his primary and secondary education in different cities, including Eskişehir, Ankara and Istanbul. He graduated from Ankara University's Faculty of Political Science in 1944. He held a PhD which he received from the same university.

== Career and arrests ==
Following the completion of his PhD studies Aren began to work at the Faculty of Political Science, Ankara University, as an associate professor and taught courses in sociology. In 1951 he was sent to Geneva to work at the United Nations' European Economic Commission. However, he resigned from the post and began to work at BBC's Turkish section. He returned to Turkey in 1956, but was arrested for a short time due to his communist activities. He became full professor in 1957 at the Faculty of Political Science, Ankara University. Following the military coup on 27 May 1960 Aren was appointed to the economic committee of the military government. In 1961 he involved in the establishment of the Workers' Party of Turkey and became the head of its Ankara branch in 1962. He became a cofounder of the Socialist Culture Association (Turkish: Sosyalist Kültür Derneği) in 1963.

Aren won a seat in the Parliament for the party representing Istanbul in 1965. Within the party Aren and Behice Boran formed an alliance. They both resigned from the party in 1968 due to their opposition against the views of the party chair Mehmet Ali Aybar. Aybar did not support the invasion of Czechoslovakia by the Soviet Union in August 1968.

Immediately after the military coup on 12 March 1971 Aren was arrested and imprisoned for three years in Niğde. He was not allowed to continue his academic work at the university and began to work as an advisor to a trade union, DİSK. He was also imprisoned one year after the military coup on 12 September 1980 and released in 1984.

Aren founded a political party, Socialist Unity Party, in 1991. Following the dissolution of the party he joined Freedom and Solidarity Party and was made the party's honorary chair.

== Personal life and death ==
Aren married Munise Hanım on 25 October 1949 with whom he had two children, a daughter and a son. He died in Ankara on 8 March 2008 and was buried there on 10 March.

=== Works and views ===
Aren is the writer of several books. He published several articles in the newspapers and magazines, including Yön, Forum, Emek, Marksizm ve Gelecek and Politika.

When Aren was a member of the Workers' Party he claimed that the focus should not be exclusively on the theory. He also argued that the clash between socialism and capitalism should be nonviolent due to the changing nature of the economy and that discussions which led to polemics were not useful. Although Aren also did not support the Soviet invasion of Czechoslovia like Mehmet Ali Aybar, he was an ardent critic of Aybar's conceptualization of democratic socialism. Because Aren argued that a non-authoritarian and democratic version of socialism was needed in Turkey. He considered statism as an ideological tool to mobilize the masses.

Aren was one of the opponents of Turkey's association with the European Economic Community on the grounds that it would have negative effects on Turkish industry which was not yet developed.
