= Esat Oktay Yıldıran =

Turkish military officer (1949-1988)

- Born: 15 February 1949; İzmir, Turkey
- Died: 22 October 1988 (aged 39); Ümraniye, Istanbul, Turkey
- Children: 2
- Military career
- Allegiance: Turkey
- Branch: Turkish Land Forces
- Rank: Major
- Conflicts: Turkish invasion of Cyprus; PKK insurgency

Esat Oktay Yıldıran (15 February 1949 – 22 October 1988) was a Turkish military officer who was appointed governor of the Diyarbakır Prison after the 1980 Turkish coup d'état. During the PKK insurgency, Yıldıran became known for his extensive torture of PKK aligned Kurds in the Diyarbakır Prison. Many inmates either committed suicide or died on hunger strikes in the penitentiary.

== Career ==
After taking part in the Turkish invasion of Cyprus in 1974, Yıldıran was promoted to major. In 1980, after the military coup which took place the same year, he was appointed to the Diyarbakır Prison by Kenan Evren as internal security officer. He tortured prisoners with cruel methods. Moreover, he viewed prison as a school in which inmates would be subjected to Turkification. Yıldıran beat, coerced and tortured the male and female prisoners. Under his force, inmates were forced to eat human excrement, doused in sewer water, tortured with electric shocks and such other torture methods. Yıldıran had a German Shepherd called "Co" ("Joe"), which was trained to bite the genitals of naked prisoners; all inmates were obligated to salute the dog.

== Assassination of Esat Oktay ==
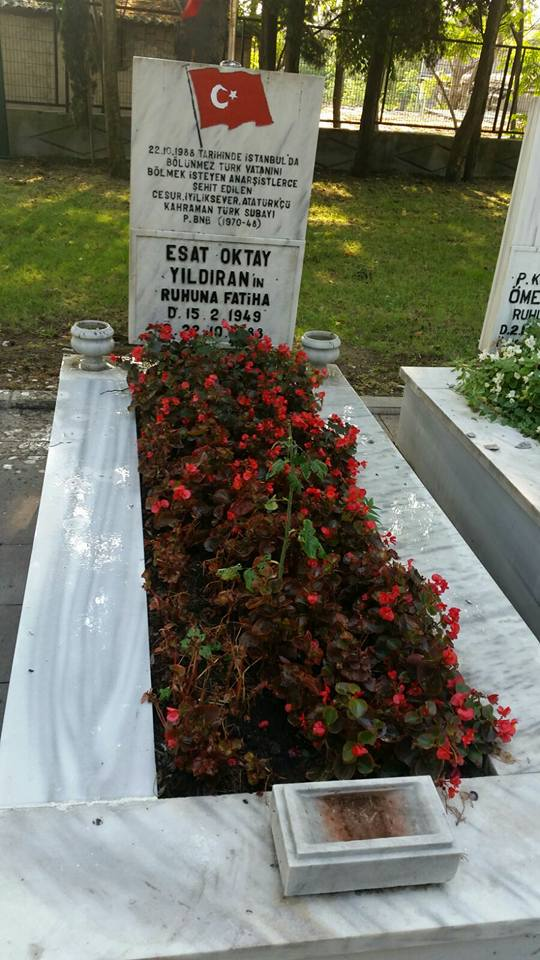
Esat Oktay Yıldıran's grave with the inscription: "The courageous, good-doer, Kemalist, heroic Turkish officer who was martyred on October 22nd, 1988 by anarchists who wanted to split the indivisible Turkish motherland."

On 22 October 1988, Yıldıran was on a public bus which stopped by at a station, and 2 suspects entered the bus and sat behind him. After the bus halted at another stop, moments later the doors opened one of the two suspects opened fired. He was shot dead on the bus in Ümraniye, Istanbul.

According to some reports, his firing assassin yelled "Laz Kemal sends his greetings" (referring to one of the inmates, Kemal Pir) before shooting him. He died in front of his wife and two children. On the 26th of October, he was buried and declared a martyr by the government.

The PKK took responsibility of the attack, after a anonymous man contacted the Cumhuriyet Gazétte later that day and stated that; "Esat Oktay Yıldıran, who was punished in Kısıklı today, was killed by the PKK." As a result, the two suspects were identified as members of the PKK, but never fully identified and were never caught.

== Aftermath ==
Yıldıran's torture methods were the subject of the Turkish television series "Bu Kalp Seni Unutur mu?" Various books have also been written about Yıldıran's torture practices. One of the most famous books is Mehdi Zana's "Hell No. 5. Diary from a Turkish Prison". Yıldıran was honored as a hero and martyr by Turkish nationalists. In 2010, the Istanbul City Council added his name to a memorial in Fatih.

In 2013, a Turkish court sentenced the journalist Rasim Ozan Kütahyalı to a suspended prison term of ten months and fined him for writing that Yıldıran was a torturer.
