= Revolutionary Cultural Eastern Hearths =

Association in Turkey

Revolutionary Cultural Eastern Hearths Devrimci Doğu Kültür Ocakları
- Abbreviation: RCEH
- Founded: 1969
- Banned: 1971
- Ideology: Kurdish nationalism (Left-wing nationalism); Marxism; Socialism
- Political position: Left-wing

The Revolutionary Cultural Eastern Hearths (Devrimci Doğu Kültür Ocakları, DDKO) was an association of mainly Kurdish students in Turkey. It was formed in 1969 and outlawed after the military coup in 1971. The DDKO leaders' defense of Kurdish identity at their court martial was, in the opinion of a historian of the era, "a watershed in the history of the Kurdish movement in Turkey."

== History of Kurdish nationalism ==
The Kurdish nationalist movement dates back to the late 19th century, when Sheikh Ubeydullah led a failed uprising that sought to create an independent Kurdish state out of the portions of the Ottoman Empire and Qajar Iran where Kurds were in the majority. Kurdish nationalists, led by Mehmed Şerif Pasha, renewed this demand for a separate Kurdish state after the First World War at the Paris Peace Conference, but ultimately lost the autonomy promised by the unratified Treaty of Sèvres (1920) in the subsequent Treaty of Lausanne (1923).

The new Republic of Turkey established by the Treaty of Lausanne not only rejected Kurdish political autonomy, but denied that the Kurds were, in fact, a separate people, referring to them as "Mountain Turks" and removing the words "Kurds" and "Kurdistan" from dictionaries and history books. In the midst of putting down repeated Kurdish uprisings in the decades after World War I, the Republic declared the region a closed military area from which foreigners were banned until 1965.

The Turkish government also adopted a policy of forced, systematic assimilation of minority populations, including resettlement of Kurds and other non-Turkish communities, prohibition of non-Turkish surnames, and limiting or prohibiting the use of languages other than Turkish in public and business settings. Starting in the early 1960s Kurdish peasant children were sent to boarding schools in large villages in which Kurdish was forbidden.

== Founding of the DDKO ==
In the late 1960s, Kurdish students organized so-called Eastern Meetings (Turkish: Doğu Mitingleri), which led to the founding of the Revolutionary Cultural Eastern Hearths in 1969. The DDKO was initially active in Ankara and Istanbul, where Abdullah Öcalan took part in their activities, but soon spread to cities in the Kurdish provinces, where branches were established in Ergani in November 1970, a month later in Silvan and Kozluk, and in January 1971 in Diyarbakır and Batman.

The DDKO received significant support from the left-wing Turkish Workers' Party (TIP), whose president, Mehmet Ali Aslan, was a Kurd. In 1969 Aslan condemned a decree issued two years earlier prohibiting the distribution of foreign material in the Kurdish language and started a bilingual Turkish-Kurdish journal, Yeni Akış (New Current), which raised the question of Kurdish national rights until it was suspended after four issues. The TIP then took the cautious, but unprecedented, step of recognizing the existence of "the Kurdish question" at its fourth congress in 1970.

== Ideology and activities ==
The DDKO demanded greater development of the Eastern Provinces and more cultural freedom for the Kurds. The DDKO also published demands on behalf of farmers in their journals, while organizing seminars about Marxism and socialism and meetings where the Kurdish question was discussed. In several of their events and gatherings, short theater plays were performed in the Kurdish language.

== Suppression and prosecution ==
In October 1970, many prominent leaders of the DDKO were arrested. After the military coup in March 1971, the DDKO itself was closed down, followed by trials of DDKO leaders under martial law.

The prosecution argued that the Kurdish people did not actually exist and that their language was in reality a Turkish dialect, claiming that 60% of its vocabulary was Turkish and the remaining 40% Arabic and Persian words. Therefore, the prosecution claimed, Kurdish was just as Turkic as Yakut or Chuvash, languages spoken by Turkic peoples in Siberia and the Volga regions of Russia, respectively. The prosecutor went on to accuse the DDKO of having had ties with the left wing of the TIP and the Revolutionary Youth Federation of Turkey (Dev-Genç), which led to separatist activities and violence that caused the military to impose martial law in 11 provinces.

Defendants Musa Anter, Necmettin Büyükkaya, and İsmail Beşikçi, along with Kurdish rights activists Edip Karahan, Mehdi Zana and Mümtaz Kotan, argued in response that Kurds were a separate people who had lived in Eastern Anatolia since 2000 B.C., while the Turks only arrived in Anatolia in the 11th century. They also contended that Kurdish is a member of the Indo-European family of languages while Turkish is an Altai-Uralic language.

The defendants drew on Arabic, Persian and Ottoman sources, as well as studies by Turkish historians, to refute the prosecution's claim that the Kurds were descended from a Turkic people and ridiculed the prosecutor’s denial that the Kurdish people had their own language by subjecting the heading of the indictment to the same sort word count analysis that the prosecutor had used, showing that except for the words "Turkey", "Martial law", "prosecution" and "province", which were Turkish, all other words were either Persian or Arabic. They followed this with a list of Kurdish words that had entered Turkish vocabulary, a summary of Kurdish syntax, an overview of Kurdish history in Ottoman and Republican times, a history of Kurdish literature, and an inventory of Kurdish complaints at the treatment of their people by the Turkish state.

The military tribunal attempted to impede such a defense, but in the end the defense was admitted and included in the case files. The defendants were nonetheless convicted. Many of the defendants were sentenced to over 10 years in prison.

This trial was the first time that advocates for the separate identity of the Kurds had the opportunity to confront the Turkish regime's denial of their existence in such an official setting. While the restrictions imposed by martial law conditions prevented their words from being heard in Turkey at the time, extracts of their historical and linguistic arguments were published abroad by Kurdish activists in European exile under the title Sen Faşist Savcı İyi Dinle: Dünyada Kürt Vardır! ("Listen Well, You Fascist Prosecutor: There are Kurds in the World!"). Their defense of Kurdish identity was finally published in Turkey after the return of civilian rule and an amnesty for all prisoners, marking, in the words of one historian, "the beginning of a wave of publications on Kurdish history and society by Kurds themselves."

== Aftermath ==
Some former DDKO members attempted to create a successor with the Devrimci Doğu Kültür Derneği (DDKD) but did not meet with success.

== See also ==
- Politics of Turkey
