= Adımlar =

Literary and political magazine in Turkey (1943-1944)

- Editor-in-chief: Behice Boran
- Categories: Literary magazine; Political magazine
- Founder: Behice Boran; Muzaffer Şerif Başoğlu
- Founded: 1943
- First issue: May 1943
- Final issue: April 1944
- Country: Turkey
- Based in: Ankara
- Language: Turkish

Adımlar (Turkish: Steps) was a literary and political magazine which appeared in Ankara, Turkey, between May 1943 and April 1944. Its subtitle was Aylık Fikir ve Kültür Dergisi (Turkish: Monthly Journal of Ideas and Culture). It is known for its cofounder, owner and editor-in-chief Behice Boran, a Turkish socialist politician, and for its introduction of humanist approach towards literature in the country.

== History and profile ==
Adımlar was established by Behice Boran and Muzaffer Şerif Başoğlu in Ankara in 1943, and its first issue was published in May that year. Boran was its owner and editor-in-chief. It billed itself as a populist and humanist publication and developed its own humanist approach known as people's humanism. One of its goals was to introduce major literary work from contemporary Western literature to improve the Turkish intellectual environment. In the discussions of these literary works the magazine employed a sociological framework. Over time Adımlar became a forum for Turkish leftist intellectuals who published articles on Fascism, freedom, and democracy criticizing the government.

Adımlar ceased publication in April 1944 after producing 12 issues. The reason for its closure was the intensified anti-communist campaign in Turkey. Behice Boran argued in an interview with the Turkish journalist Uğur Mumcu in 1986 that her articles led to the government pressure on and the closure of both Adımlar and Yurt ve Dünya in 1944.

All issues of Adımlar are archived by TUSTAV.

In the documents of the Federal Bureau of Investigation on Muzaffer Şerif Başoğlu, known as Muzafer Sherif in the US, Adımlar was described as an extremely nationalist, extremely liberal, and anti-racist publication.

== Contributors ==
In addition to Behice Boran various leading Turkish writers contributed to Adımlar, including Nermin Menemencioğlu, Hilmi Ziya Ülken, Jean Camborde, Burhan Arpad, Walter Ruben, Liko Amar, Yunus Kâzım Köni, Bekir Kunt, Nurullah Ataç, Suat Taşer, Rıfat Ilgaz, Sabahattin Ali, Kemal Bilbaşar and Orhan Kemal. Zeki Baştımar, a member of the Turkish Communist Party, also published articles in the magazine. Other leftist figures worked for Adımlar were Pertev Naili Boratav and Adnan Cemgil. Most of the Adımlar contributors were academics at Ankara University.
