= United Communist Party of Turkey =

United Communist Party of Turkey Türkiye Birleşik Komünist Partisi
- Abbreviation: TBKP
- President: Nihat Sargın
- Founder: Nihat Sargın; Nabi Yağcı
- Founded: 4 June 1990
- Dissolved: 16 July 1991
- Preceded by: TKP; TİP
- Succeeded by: SBP
- Ideology: Communism
- Political position: Far-left

United Communist Party of Turkey (Turkish: Türkiye Birleşik Komünist Partisi) was a political party in Turkey.

== History ==
The leadership of two banned parties Communist Party of Turkey (TKP) and Workers Party of Turkey (TİP) who went to exile after the 1980 Turkish coup d'état announced on 8 October 1987 in Brussels that they had decided to merge and form TBKP. Nihat Sargın (general secretary of TİP) and Yaşar Nabi Yağcı (Haydar Kutlu) (general secretary of TKP) returned to Turkey from exile in Europe with the stated aim to set up TBKP legally. However, they were promptly arrested and imprisoned. In 1988, it was announced that the merger was carried out and TBKP formed in a clandestine congress.

In 1989, several leading members of (clandestine) TBKP publicly disclosed their identity as TBKP leaders and members and stated the party's intention to operate legally. In 1990, Sargın and Yağcı were released from prison after a 19-days hunger strike to demand freedom and right to operate legally. Sargın, Yağcı and their followers finally launched TBKP as a formal political party the same year. Chairman of TBKP was Nihat Sargın and Nabi Yağcı was the general secretary. However, the Constitutional Court banned the party in 1991, and Sargın and Yağcı were banned from holding office in any other party. The case was taken up by the European Court of Human Rights, which found that the ban violated the Convention for the Protection of Human Rights and Fundamental Freedoms.

Before the Court officially banned the party, TBKP had held a legal congress (the first time-ever legal congress of communists in Turkey). In this congress, a resolution was adopted overwhelmingly calling on all its members to join a project to form a broader-based socialist party, the Socialist Unity Party (SBP), with other socialist groupings and individuals. In the following years, Socialist Unity Party itself turned into United Socialist Party with the participation of yet other leftist groups. Finally, the party merged with the former Revolutionary Path (Devrimci Yol) cadres to form the Freedom and Solidarity Party (ÖDP).

== See also ==
- List of illegal political parties in Turkey
- Communist Party of Turkey (disambiguation), for other groups using similar names
