= Socialist Unity Party (Turkey) =

Socialist Unity Party Sosyalist Birlik Partisi
- Leader: Sadun Aren
- Founder: Sadun Aren
- Founded: 15 January 1991
- Banned: 19 July 1995
- Preceded by: United Communist Party of Turkey
- Headquarters: Ankara
- Ideology: Socialism

The Socialist Unity Party (Turkish: Sosyalist Birlik Partisi, abbreviated SBP) was a political party in Turkey. The party was founded on January 15, 1991. It was headed by Sadun Aren, a former university professor. The party was largely a successor organization of the banned United Communist Party of Turkey (TBKP). SBP held its first party congress in Ankara in May 1992.

The party was banned on July 19, 1995. The remains of the party merged into the United Socialist Party (BSP).
