= SS Bandırma =

Ottoman mixed-freight ship

Coordinates: 41°16′24″N 36°22′02″E

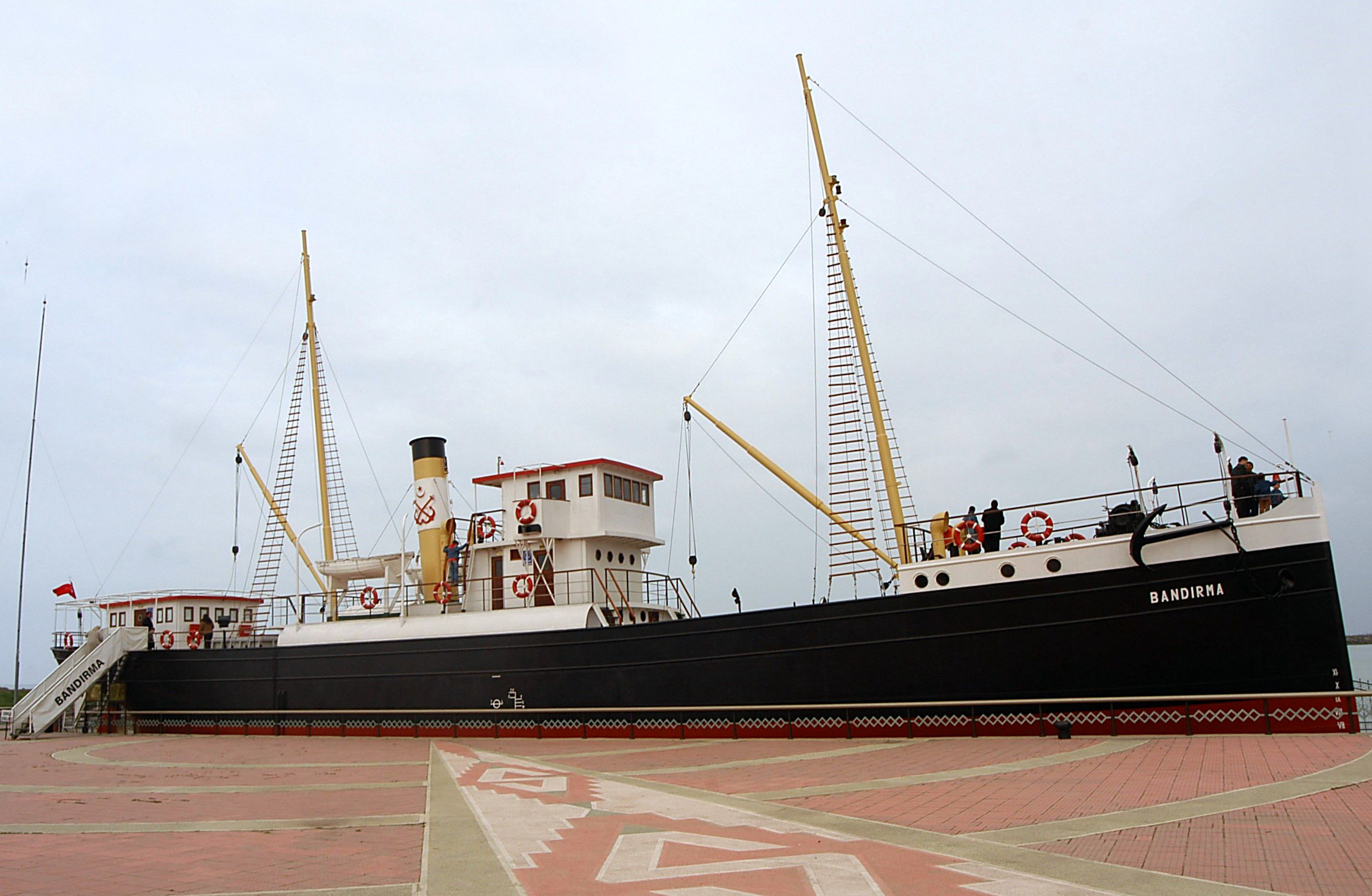
- SS Bandırma ship replica in Samsun

History

Ottoman Empire
- Name: SS Bandırma (1910); (Ottoman Empire) ex Panderma (1894); (Greece) ex Kymi (1883); (United Kingdom) ex Trocadero (1878)
- Builder: Paisley, Scotland
- Launched: 1878
- Out of service: 1924
- Fate: Broken up

General characteristics
- Type: Cargo ship
- Tonnage: 192 GRT
- Length: 47.7 m (156 ft 6 in)

SS Bandırma was an Ottoman mixed-freight ship, which became famous for her historical role in taking Mustafa Kemal Pasha (Atatürk) from Constantinople (today-Istanbul) to Samsun in May 1919 that marked the establishment of the Turkish national movement.

== The ship ==
The steamer Bandırma, built in 1878 in Paisley, Scotland, was a 47.7-metre (156 ft) cargo ship with 192 gross register tons capacity. It was christened Trocadero, and under this name, it sailed for five years as a freighter for Dansey and Robinson. In 1883, it was purchased by Greek ship-owner H. Psicha Preaus, and renamed SS Kymi. 7 years later, it was sold to another Greek ship-owner, Cap. Andreadis, sailing under the same name. In 1891, it went down following an accident, but could be floated again.

The Ottoman Maritime Co. purchased the ship in 1894, renamed it SS Panderma. It served in the Sea of Marmara as a passenger-cargo vessel. On 28 October 1910, the company's status was changed, and it was renamed Ottoman Transportation Authority. The ship's name was also changed to SS Bandırma, Turkish for Panderma, and it served then as a mail ship in the coastal waters of the Ottoman Empire.

During World War I, SS Bandırma collided with the British submarine HMS E11, and survived a torpedo attack from the same vessel. Bandırma was taken out of duty in 1924. It was sold in 1925, and demolished in a shipyard in Golden Horn within four months.

== The mission ==
It went into the history of Republic of Turkey, when Mustafa Kemal Pasha, who was appointed shortly before Inspector of the Ninth Army Troops Inspectorate of the Ottoman Empire in eastern Anatolia, left Constantinople with SS Bandırma on 16 May 1919 for Samsun. He was sent to Anatolia by sultan's decree to oversee the process of disbanding the Ottoman Army that was ordered by the Entente powers occupying the capital and controlling the Ottoman government.

Mustafa Kemal Pasha, accompanied by 22 officers, 25 soldiers, and 8 administrative staff, sailed in heavy weather on the old steamer with a not functioning compass needed to navigate in the wavy Black Sea, and set foot on land in Samsun on 19 May 1919. Upon landing, Mustafa Kemal Pasha started the Turkish national movement contrary to the orders given to him by the Ottoman government in İstanbul that resulted in the declaration of the Republic of Turkey after the Turkish War of Independence almost four years later.

== The replica ==
In view of its important historical role in the birth of the Republic of Turkey, the governor and the mayor of Samsun Province both initiated the rebuilding of Bandırma in its original dimensions and outlook. The building of the replica by Taşkınlar Shipbuilding Co. started on 9 May 2000 and was completed on 15 April 2001. The new Bandırma was opened as a museum ship by Prime Minister Recep Tayyip Erdoğan on 19 May 2003 at Doğu Park (East Park) in Samsun. Wax figures of Mustafa Kemal Pasha and his followers on the ship are on display along with historical items in the museum ship today.

== Ship's register ==
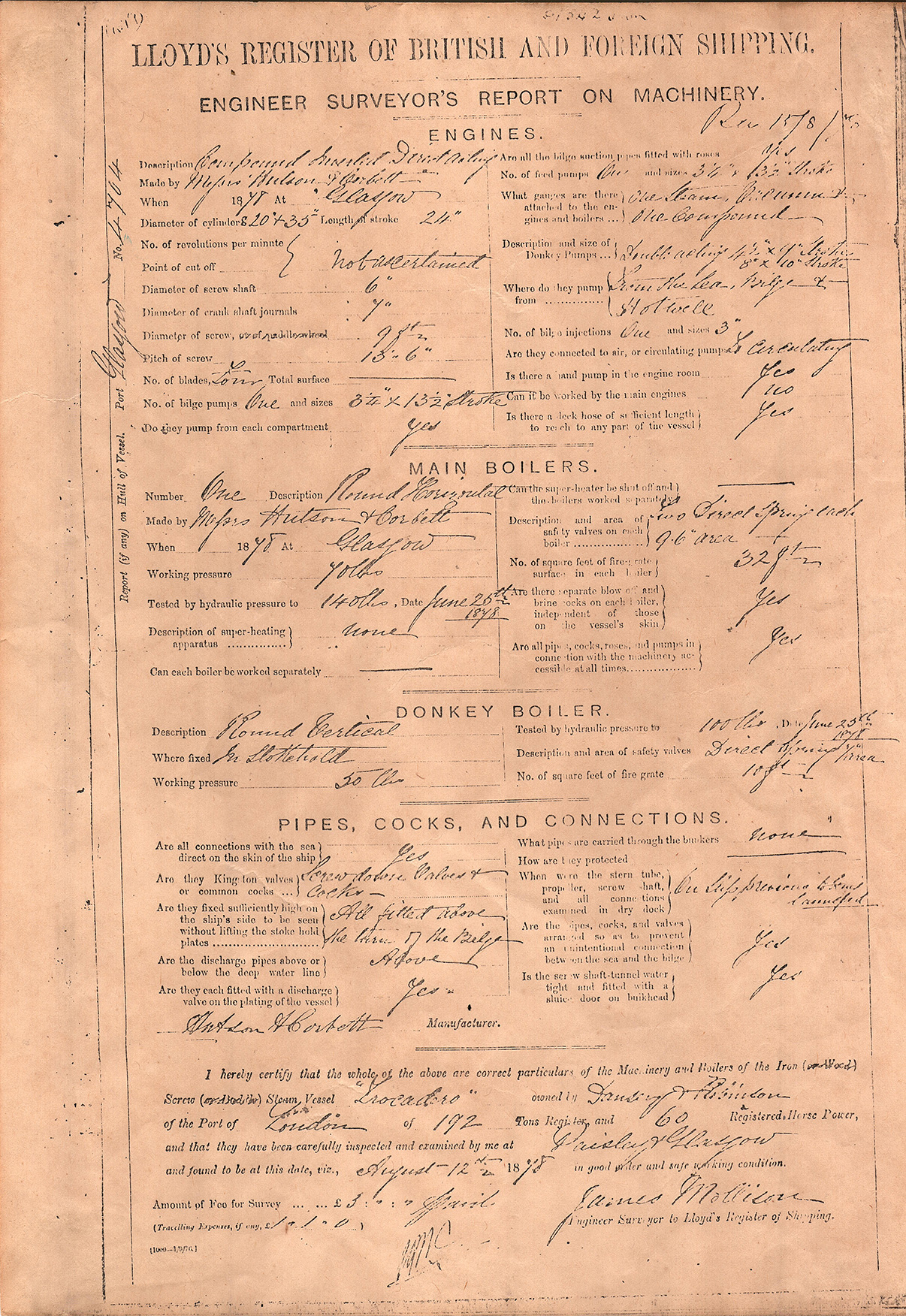
Ship's original Lloyd's registration paper.

- 1878 SS Trocadero, Great Britain, Dansey and Robinson
- 1883 SS Kymi, Greece, H. Psicha Preus
- 1890 SS Kymi, Greece, Cap. Andreadis
- 1894 SS Panderma, Ottoman Empire, Ottoman Maritime Co.
- 1910 SS Bandırma, Ottoman Empire, Ottoman Transportation Co.
- 1924 taken out of service
- 1925 demolished
- 2001 replica built
- 2003 replica put in service as museum ship in Samsun
