= Mehdi Zana =

Turkish politician (1940–2026)

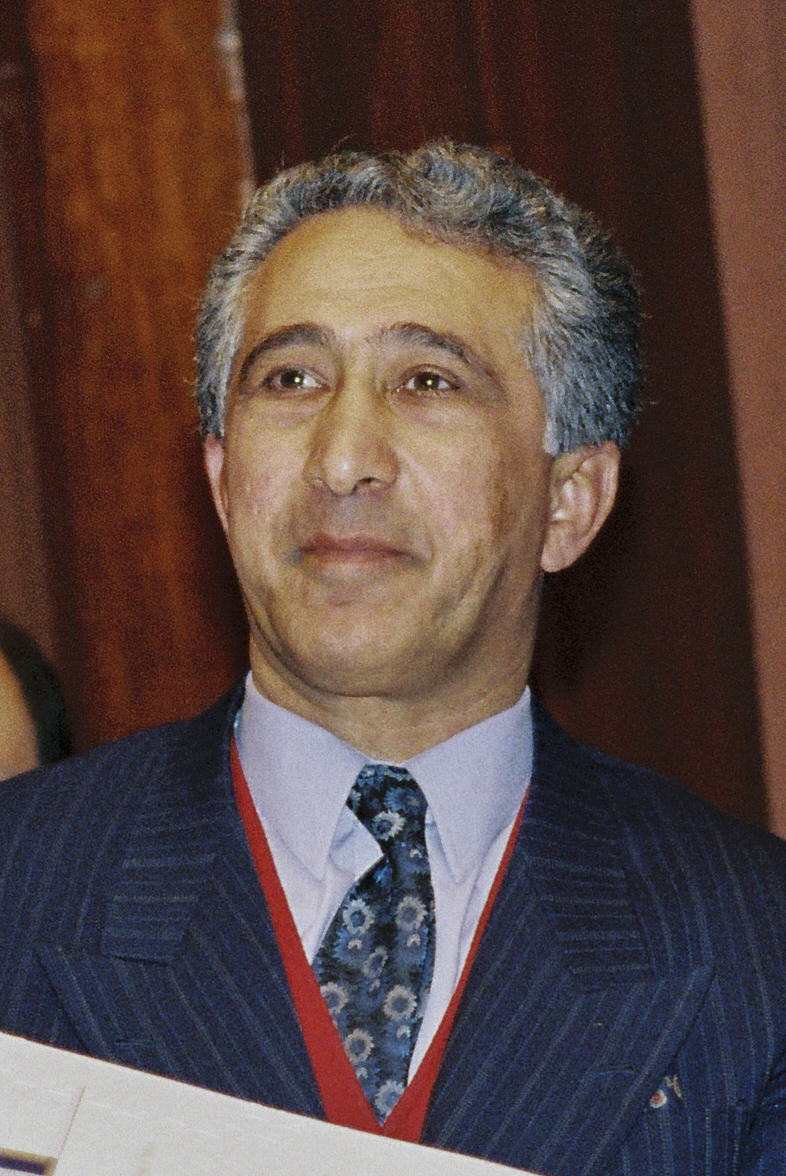
- Zana at the 1995 Sakharov Prize ceremony

Mayor of Diyarbakır
- In office 1977–1980
- Preceded by: Okay Kalfagil
- Succeeded by: Feyyaz Üzümcü

Personal details
- Born: Mehdi Bilici; 20 December 1940 Silvan, Diyarbakır Province, Turkey
- Died: 29 August 2026 (aged 85) Diyarbakır, Turkey
- Party: Workers Party of Turkey
- Spouse: Leyla Zana (m. 1975)
- Children: 2
- Occupation: Politician, author

Mehdi Zana (20 December 1940 – 29 August 2026) was a Turkish author and politician. He was a prominent Kurdish political activist and a mayor of Diyarbakır. Following the coup d'état in 1980 he was imprisoned for more than ten years.

== Early life and education ==
Born in Silvan, Turkey, on 20 December 1940, Zana went to the local elementary school but did not finish high school. He began work as a tailor at a shop owned by a prominent Kurdist intellectual, Niyazi Tatlıcı. The tailor workshop has been described as a sort of a "university" by political activists of the time. In the Eastern Meetings (Doğu mitingleri) he attempted to organize a Kurdish theater tour through four villages in Diyarbakır but didn't succeed. Besides he was also involved in the Revolutionary Cultural Eastern Hearths (DDKO).

== Political career ==
In 1963 he became a member of Workers Party of Turkey (TİP) of which two years later he became the head of the Silvan branch. While in Silvan, he supported the establishment of a theater company with the aim to draw interest on socialism and the Kurdishness. In the parliamentary election of 1969, the TIP unsuccessfully put him forward as candidate for Diyarbakır. He was straight forward and urged the people to acknowledge their Kurdishness and changed his Turkish given name Bilici into the Kurdish equivalent. Due to his activism, he was detained for a year in the late 1960s and again between 1971 and 1974. He also traveled to Syria and Iran, where he attempted to extend his Kurdish political network. In August 1977, he announced his candidacy for mayor of Diyarbakir. During the electoral campaign, he often held speeches in Kurdish, and focused on a Kurdish "us" and a Turkish "them". He rallied for the support of the Kurdish tribes, of which the tribes of the Omeyran and the Botan also supported him. In the local elections of December 1977, he was elected as the first independent socialist mayor of Diyarbakır. He won against the candidate supported by the TIP and the pro-Kurdish DDKO, Yahya Mehmetoğlu. After the 1980 Turkish coup d'état he was imprisoned until April 1991. After his release he went to France for medical treatment until February 1992. He was imprisoned again between 1994 and 1995.

=== Political views ===
As mayor he engaged with other Kurds in the aim to foment a transnational aid network. He encouraged the use of Kurdish language in the city council and the municipality. He undertook various trips to Sweden, France and Germany and in 1979 several socialist-run cities in France sent fifteen trucks and buses to Diyarbakır as gift. A member of the DDKO, he was a constant defender of Kurdish rights, and he acknowledged the Kurdish role in the Armenian genocide.

== Personal life and death ==
Mehdi Zana married his cousin and later politician Leyla Zana in 1975, who was 14 years old at that time and the couple had two children. He was imprisoned for 16 years during his life. After his release in 1995, he went to collect the Sakharov Prize in 1996 on behalf of his imprisoned wife, Leyla Zana. Following his release, he lived for several years in exile in Europe where he lived in Sweden and Germany. Zana changed his name from the Turkish Bilici into the Kurdish equivalent Zana.

Zana died on 29 August 2026, at the age of 85.

== Bibliography ==
- Zana, Mehdî (2013). Wait Diyarbakir: Account of Kurdish Struggle. Blue Crane Books. ISBN 978-1-886434-11-0.
- Zana, Mehdî (2006). Postal darbelerıyle uyanmak (in Kurdish). İstanbul: Medîsa Eğitim Basım Yayın Reklam. ISBN 978-975-9094-63-8. OCLC 542825389.
- Zana, Mehdî (2005). Ay dayê. Weşanên Tevn; Roman (in Kurdish). Aksaray, İstanbul: Weşanên Tevn. ISBN 978-975-9094-03-4. OCLC 72801208.
- Zana, Mehdî (2004). Parastina min (in Kurdish). Stockholm: Evra. ISBN 978-91-87662-51-5. OCLC 84678587.
- Zana, Mehdî; Vauquelin, André (1997). Prison No. 5: Eleven Years in Turkish Jails (1st ed.). Watertown, MA, USA: Blue Crane Books. ISBN 978-1-886434-05-9. OCLC 260083915.
- Zana, Mehdî (1995). Sevgili Leyla : uzun bir sürgündü o gece. Belge Yayınları, 243; Yaşam ve anılar (in Turkish) (1st ed.). İstanbul: Belge Yayınları. ISBN 978-975-344-086-8. OCLC 260193256.
