= Kurdistan Democratic Party/North =

Kurdistan Democratic Party/North Partiya Demokrat a Kurdistan/Bakur
- Abbreviation: KDP–Bakur
- Founded: 1965
- Ideology: Kurdish nationalism Separatism
- Political position: Big tent
- Slogan: Rêbaz a Barzani ("On Barzani's path")

Party flag

Website
- www.pdk-bakur.com

Kurdistan Democratic Party/North or Türkiye Kürdistan Demokrat Partisi (TKDP), or Partiya Demokrata Kurdistana Turkiye (PDK-T) (Turkish: Kürdistan Demokrat Partisi/Kuzey; Kurdish: Partiya Demokrat a Kurdistan/Bakur), abbreviated KDP/Bakur or PDK/Bakur, is an illegal political party active in Turkey. The aim of the party is to create an independent state for the Kurdish people.

== History ==
The TKDP was founded as an illegal party in 1965. Prominent co-founders of the Party were Şerafettin Elçi and Faik Bucak. In September 1992 it merged with the Ala Rızgari Birlik Platformu, Ulusal Birlik Platformu (Bergeh) to the PDK/Bakur, some groups that had separated from Rızgari and some independents through a Congress of Union. Its original name was Hevgırtın-PDK.

When the Second Congress convened in November 1994, the party changed its name to PDK/Bakur. This was a result of the party taking the geographical scope of its activities into consideration, suggesting that southeastern Turkey is northern Kurdistan.

At its 10th convention in 2013, the party decided it would seek legalization as soon as it becomes legal to use the words "Kurdish" or "Kurdistan" in the name of a party.

== Doctrine ==
According to its program PDK/Bakur is a "national salvation" party. It has a national democratic character and therefore is open to different views. All points of view that are not fascist, racist, against equality of men and women, brotherhood of peoples and peace can be advanced within the party. Aspiring to become a secular political party open to leftists, liberals and conservatives alike, it is influenced by the rather conservative profile of Massoud Barzani's Iraqi Kurdistan Democratic Party.

The party demanded an adaptation of the Turkish constitution in the sense that it is accepted that there exist a Kurdish and a Turkish nation within Turkey and refuses the separation of Kurdish nation between different nation-states and renders illegitimate all international arrangements that support this status quo. Besides it also asserted that of the profits gained from the extraction of natural resources in Kurdistan three quarters should be invested in Kurdistan. It states that it aims to create a parliamentary democracy in the part of Kurdistan that lies within Republic of Turkey, make Kurdish people enjoy all rights bestowed on them by international law and create the conditions for a self-determination.

== Designation as a Terrorist Organisation ==
According to the Counter-Terrorism and Operations Department of General Directorate of Security of Turkey it is one of the 12 active organisations which is considered as a terrorist organization by the Turkish government and one of the three Kurdish separatist organisations. The list refers to the organisation as Kürdistan Demokrat Partisi/Bakur.

== See also ==
- List of political parties in Turkey
