= Şişli Mosque =

Mosque in Istanbul, Turkey

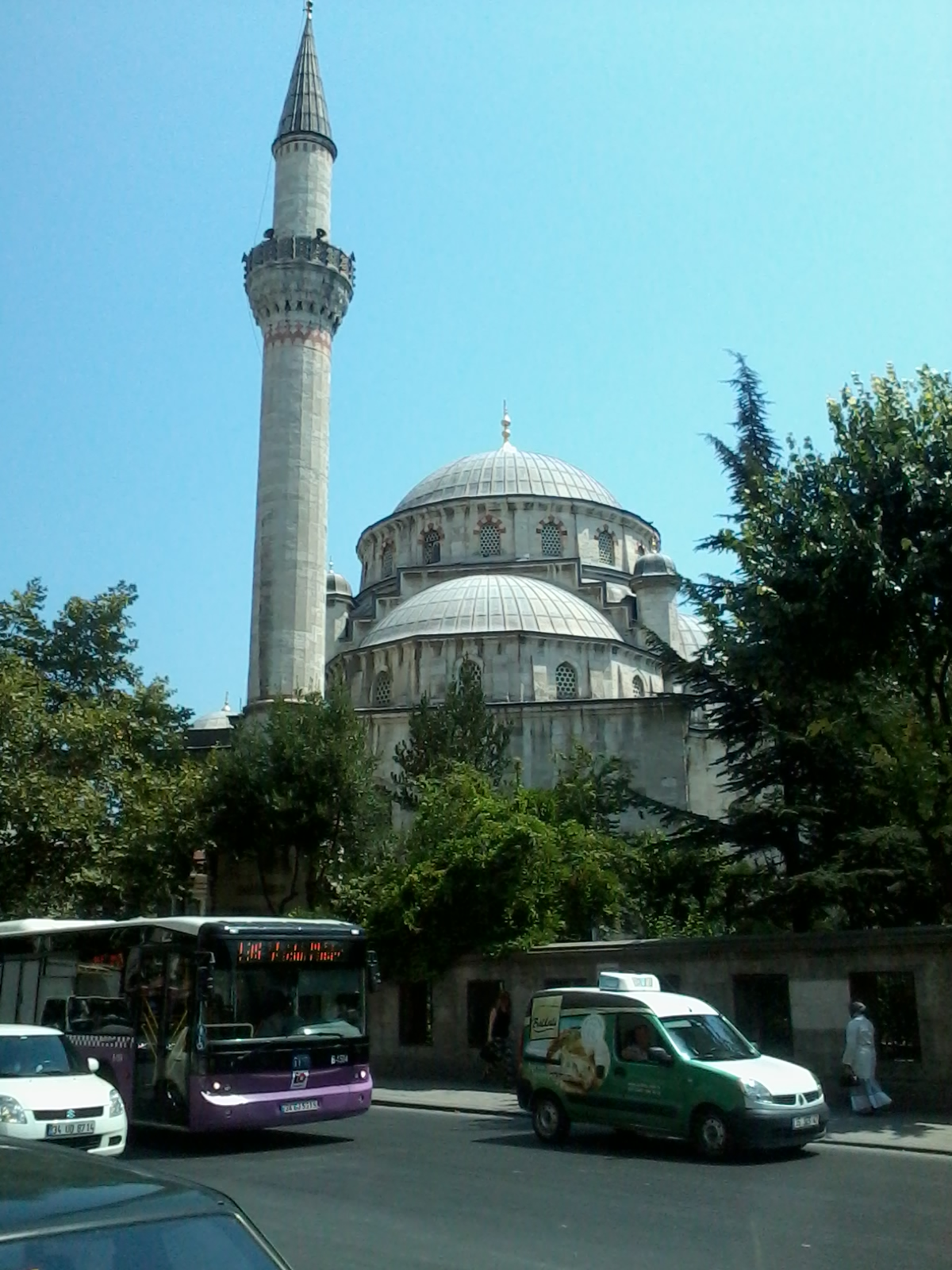

Religion
- Affiliation: Islam

Location
- Location: Şişli, Istanbul, Turkey
- Interactive map of Şişli Mosque
- Coordinates: 41°03′41″N 28°59′16″E

Architecture
- Architect: Vasfi Egeli
- Type: Mosque
- Style: Islamic
- Groundbreaking: 1945
- Completed: 1949; 77 years ago

Specifications
- Domes: 1 main dome and 3 half-domes
- Minaret: 1
- Materials: Gritstone, Marble

The Şişli Mosque (Turkish: Şişli Camii) is a mosque located in Şişli Square between the Büyükdere Avenue, the Halaskargazi and Abide-i Hürriyet streets in the Şişli district of Istanbul, Turkey.

Due to lack of any mosque in Şişli, which got incorporated into the urban area with the rapid expansion of the city in the 1940s, the residents demanded the building of a mosque. With the initiative of Mayor Lütfi Kırdar, a land of 3,219 m^{2} (34,650 sq ft) was left over to a symbolic price to the trustees of the mosque.

Designed in classical Ottoman architectural style by architect Ali Vasfi Egeli, its construction began in 1945, and it was opened to worship in 1949. It is the first mosque in Istanbul ever built after 1923, in the Republican era.

The mosque, built of gritstone (coarse-grained sandstone) ashlar, is situated in a walled courtyard having three gates. The building has a porticoed entrance porch, is topped with a main dome flanked by three half-domes, and has a minaret featuring one gallery with muqarnas.

Over the hobnailed main entrance door, a calligraphic inscription in Arabic script is fixed, which was created by Hamid Aytaç (1891-1982). In the center of the courtyard, a dodecagon-shaped sadirvan spends water for ritual washing wudu. The courtyard houses also spaces for the imam, muezzin, other mosque officials, and a library.

The entrance to the mosque is reached by stairs. Inside, a marble fountain is situated in the center. Pews are located on both sides of the entrance. The ground is covered by a rose-colored carpet, and heated underground. The ceiling is decorated. There are calligraphic scripts on the inner walls. The windows over the marble-made mihrab are of stained glass.
