= Mehmet Ali Aybar =

Turkish politician

Second president of the Workers' Party of Turkey
- In office 1962–1969
- Preceded by: Avni Erakalın
- Succeeded by: Mehmet Ali Aslan

Personal details
- Born: 5 October 1908 Istanbul, Ottoman Empire
- Died: 10 July 1995 (aged 86) Istanbul, Turkey

Mehmet Ali Aybar (pronounced [mehmet aɫi ajbaɾ]; 5 October 1908 – 10 July 1995) was a lawyer, member of the Turkish parliament, the second president of the Workers Party of Turkey (Turkish: Türkiye İşçi Partisi or briefly TİP), the founder and President of the Socialist Revolution Party, and a member of the Russell Tribunal against the war crimes of the United States in Vietnam. He is known as one of the most prominent proponents of democratic socialism in Turkish political history.

== Biography ==
Mehmet Ali Aybar was born in Istanbul in 1908. He was a great-grandson of the Prussian-born Ottoman general Mehmed Ali Pasha, and thus a relative of Turkish poets Nâzım Hikmet and Oktay Rıfat Horozcu, as well as the statesman Ali Fuat Cebesoy. Aybar's father was Tahsin Bey, who was the son of Hüseyin Hüsnü Pasha, first commander of the Action Army. Another ancestor of his is Gelenbevi Ismail Efendi.

He studied at Galatasaray High School, and graduated from Istanbul University's School of Law. He then moved to Paris to continue his legal studies. It was in Paris that he was exposed to Marxist literature. Upon returning to Istanbul he became assistant professor of international law at the same Law School he graduated from. His academic career was hampered by his communist leanings, and he was eventually expelled from the university in 1946. His writings for the Istanbul magazine Hür (Free) engendered anger on the part of the government and he was briefly imprisoned.

In 1950, Aybar was pardoned and began practicing law in Istanbul. He continued his activist writings and began participating in protests against the government, leading to his second arrest. After his release from prison in 1962, he became the first leader of the Workers' Party of Turkey. It was only after he ascended to party leadership that intellectuals began to take the party seriously. Aybar's credibility drew academics to the party As the leader of the party, he and his associates were responsible for the direction and success of the party. One of the primary tenets of the party was to resist Turkey's subservience to American influence. Aybar personally opposed the Soviet Union's invasion of Czechoslovakia and this caused disputes in the party. In 1971 he resigned from TİP as a result of his ideological split with party leadership over the Czechoslovakia issue. In 1975 he founded Socialist Party (later called Socialist Revolution Party). This party was closed by the military coup in 1980. Aybar was also a member of the International War Crimes Tribunal which was founded by Bertrand Russell. Mehmet Ali Aybar died on 10 July 1995 in İstanbul.

== Olympics ==
He participated in the 1928 Summer Olympics as track and field athlete for Turkey. He was eliminated in the first round of the 100 metres event. He was also a member of the Turkish team which was eliminated in the first round of the 4×100 metre relay competition.

== Notes ==
Party political offices
Preceded by Kemal Türkler	Leader of the Workers Party of Turkey (TİP); 1962–1969	Succeeded by M. Ali Aslan
