= Behice Boran =

Turkish politician (1910–1987)

President of the Turkish Workers' Party
- In office 1970–1972
- Succeeded by: Şaban Yıldız

Member of Parliament
- In office 1965–1969

Personal details
- Born: 1 May 1910 Bursa, Ottoman Empire, (modern Turkey)
- Died: 10 October 1987 (aged 77) Brussels, Belgium
- Spouse: Nevzat Hatko
- Education: University of Michigan

Behice Boran (1 May 1910 – 10 October 1987) was a Turkish Marxist-Leninist politician, author and sociologist. As a dissenting political voice from the far-left, Boran was repeatedly imprisoned for her work and died in exile after the Turkish military coup of 1980.

== Biography ==
Boran was born in Bursa to Kazan Tatar parents whose families had settled in the Ottoman Empire during the 1890s. She graduated from American College for Girls in Istanbul and studied sociology at the University of Michigan in the United States. She received a PhD on sociology in 1939 from the University of Michigan, and was involved in Marxism. She was nominated to Ankara University, Faculty of Language and History-Geography as an associate professor.

She also joined the clandestine Communist Party of Turkey (TKP) and began publishing left-wing periodicals, Yurt ve Dünya (Turkish: Motherland and World) and Adımlar (Turkish: Steps), which led to her sacking from the university. In 1950, she led the formation of the Turkish Peacelovers Association, which protested against Turkey's participation in the Korean War, which led to her arrest and a sentence of 15 months in prison. In 1965, Boran was elected deputy from the Workers' Party of Turkey in the Turkish parliament. Within the party Boran and Sadun Aren formed an alliance, known as Aren-Boran faction.

In 1970, she assumed the leadership of the party. She was arrested after the military coup of 1971 and sentenced to 15 years of imprisonment. After she was released following an amnesty in 1974, she re-established the TİP in 1975.

After the military coup of 1980, Boran went into exile in Europe, living as a political refugee in Sofia, Brussels and Düsseldorf. In 1987, she announced that TİP and TKP had decided to merge. She died soon after this press conference from heart disease in Brussels, Belgium. She was 77 years old. Her body was brought to Istanbul and her funeral turned into a mass demonstration, the first public show of force of Turkey's left-wing movement after the coup.

== See also ==
- Politics of Turkey
