= Workers' Party of Turkey (1961) =

Workers' Party of Turkey Türkiye İşçi Partisi
- Abbreviation: TİP
- Leader: Mehmet Ali Aybar; Behice Boran
- Founded: 13 February 1961
- Banned: 16 October 1981
- Merged into: TBKP
- Ideology: Socialism; Marxism; Left-wing nationalism
- Political position: Left-wing

The Workers' Party of Turkey (Turkish: Türkiye İşçi Partisi) was a Turkish political party, founded on 13 February 1961. It became the first socialist party in Turkey to win representation in the national parliament. It was banned twice (after the military coups of 1971 and 1980) and eventually merged with the Communist Party of Turkey in 1987.

During the inaugural press conference held on the day of its foundation, the founders declared that the mission of the party was "to protect the rights of the oppressed working class in Turkey" and that "members of the TİP, together with intellectuals, will work for the establishment of social security and will fully recognize and promote the right to strike."

Despite having advantages over other Marxist groups in terms of being the most widespread organization in the Turkish left, TİP was unable to establish an ideological, political, and organizational continuity which led to its gradual disintegration and failure to establish a lasting tradition. The party represented a more parliamentarian wing of the socialist movement in Turkey. It did not have the structure of a Leninist organization.

== History ==
Following the victory of anti-fascist forces in 1945, leftist parties emerged, but were swiftly dismantled within six months under martial law. In spite of this setback, several efforts were made to establish socialist parties, such as the Democratic Labor Party in 1950 and the Homeland Party (VP) founded in 1954 by Hikmet Kıvılcımlı. However, these endeavors were on a limited scale and only endured for three to five years, ultimately falling short of the aspirations placed upon them. Beginning in the mid-1950s, as the terror of the 1951-52 TKP arrests waned, the rise of the Democrat Party (DP) began to stumble, and the VP was limited to Hikmet Kıvılcımlı's inner circle, a number of leftist intellectuals and labour leaders, independently of each other, took it upon themselves to investigate the feasibility of establishing a leftist political party. In this respect, the TİP was the product of various organizational experiments and independent searches throughout the 1950s, with the contribution of the favorable political environment provided by the events of May 27th and the new constitution.

TİP was founded in 1961 by a group of labour unionists, who were members of the İstanbul İşçi Sendikaları Birliği. In its first year, the party struggled in organizing and publishing. They decided that if the party was not to close down, they needed intellectuals. In 1962, they invited constitutional lawyer Mehmet Ali Aybar to assume the leadership of the party, who accepted the offer. Following Aybar, several intellectuals like Çetin Altan, Aziz Nesin and Yaşar Kemal also joined the ranks and the party soon adopted a left-wing nationalist and socialist program.

The party's breakthrough came in the 1965 general election when it got 3% of the votes in the national elections and won 15 seats in the parliament. TİP deputies' highly publicized active participation in parliamentary sessions contributed to a radicalisation of the political scene in the country. By 1967–68, militant left-wing student organizations and labour unions were formed.

Towards the end of the 1960s, there were important ruptures in the party. In 1968, after the Soviet invasion of Czechoslovakia, Aybar adopted a rhetoric hostile to Soviet Communism. 1968 was also the year in which the effectiveness and prestige of the TİP among the labor movement, the Kurdish movement, the Alevi progressives and the Marxist intellectuals, young and old, was significantly broken.

When TİP failed to increase its votes in the 1969 general election, Aybar resigned from the party leadership in November 1969 and Behice Boran, who had opposed Aybar's anti-Soviet stand, was elected as the first female Turkish party leader. The struggle led by Boran in 1969-70 aimed to prevent and control the disintegration process. The struggle was characterized by "strengthening by purification and tightening the ranks" in line with the spirit of the period. The party was a supporter of the pro-Kurdish Revolutionary Cultural Eastern Hearths (DDKO). During its Party Congress in October 1970, it recognized existence of the Kurdish community in eastern part of the country which had to affront policies of forced assimilation.

After the military coup of 1971, the party criticized the government and supported strikes against the military coup. The government subsequently accused the TİP supporting the separation of the unity of Turkey, and for viewing the Kurds as a different ethnicity. A lawsuit was started on the 26 July 1971, the party banned in 1972. Boran and other senior TİP leaders, were arrested and sentenced between 12 and 15 years, imprisonment, the TİP delegates to 8 years. They were released following an amnesty in 1974 and re-established TİP the next year. But the party could not regain its popularity. In 1978 the Bahçelievler massacre saw seven student members of the TİP killed in Ankara by ultranationalists.

TİP was once again banned after the military coup in 1980. This time, Boran went to exile in Europe and the party continued to operate clandestinely. In 1987, it merged with the Communist Party of Turkey to form the United Communist Party of Turkey in Brussels.

The party was refounded with the same name in 2017, led by Erkan Baş. The modern TİP was formed by a faction that emerged within the TKP after a split in 2014, therefore it is not a direct successor of the historical TİP. TİP currently has 4 MPs in the Grand National Assembly of Turkey.

== Notable politicians ==
- Çetin Altan
- Sadun Aren
- Mehmet Ali Aybar
- Mihri Belli
- Behice Boran
- Mahir Çayan
- Yusuf Ekinci
- Deniz Gezmiş
- Fatma Hikmet İşmen
- Yalçın Küçük
- Doğan Özgüden
- Kemal Türkler
- Mehdi Zana

== See also ==
- Workers' Party (Turkey)
- Workers' Party of Turkey (2017)
- June 15-16 events (Turkey)
- Labour Party of Turkey
