= 1968 movement in Turkey =

The 1968 movement in Turkey or the generation '68 (Turkish: 68 Kuşağı) was a student movement that emerged during the Protests of 1968 and later evolved into an armed resistance, particularly in Eastern Anatolia and Southeastern Anatolia. The generation '68 has changed the trajectory of Turkey's modern history and was one of the leading causes of the beginning of armed struggle in Turkey, political violence in Turkey, 1980 Turkish coup d'état and the political atmosphere after the coup d'état in 1980. The movement included key figures like Deniz Gezmiş, Mahir Çayan, Kemal Bingöllü, İbrahim Kaypakkaya, Behice Boran, Sevgi Soysal, Şirin Cemgil, İlkay Demir, Gülten Savaşçı, Hatice Alankuş, Füsun Özbilgen, Necmiye Alpay, Hasan Yalçın, Cihan Alptekin, Hüseyin İnan, Yusuf Aslan, Ertuğrul Kürkçü, Harun Karadeniz, Sinan Cemgil, Teslim Töre, Ali Haydar Yıldız, Rasih Ulaş Bardakçı, Kadir Manga, Ahmet Atasoy, Alpaslan Özdoğan, Hüseyin Cevahir, Ömer Ayna, Taylan Özgür, Doğu Perinçek.

== Background ==
After the victory of the Democrat Party in the 1950 Turkish general election and 1950 Turkish presidential election, Turkey experienced a decade of liberalization, urbanization, and industrialization, fueled by the party's liberal policies as well as the Marshall Plan. However, these liberal policies later shifted toward authoritarianism, which ultimately resulted in the 1960 Turkish coup d'état. The constitution promulgated following the 1960 Turkish coup d'état, granted civil liberties and freedom of expression not previously guaranteed in Turkish constitutional history. It included checks on the accumulation of executive power, reformed the judiciary, extended labor rights, and encouraged a more pluralistic democratic framework compared with the previous constitution of 1924. The political atmosphere and institutional liberties brought by the coup saw the establishment of the Workers' Party of Turkey, which was the first legal communist party in Turkey since the Communist Party of Turkey, as well as the foundation of the DİSK, which was established following the 1961 Constitution and the trade union acts of 1964. DİSK was the first legal left-wing trade union confederation in Turkey. The institutionalization of the left also produced pluralization within Turkish society, particularly in universities, which heavily influenced the '68 movement as a student movement.
