= Kızıldere Incident =

Event in the Turkish political history, 70s turmoil

The Kızıldere Incident (Turkish: Kızıldere Olayı) was a political armed conflict that took place in the Kızıldere village of the Turkish city of Tokat on 26 March 1972, which ended in the deaths of nine Turkish leftist guerrillas belonging to People's Liberation Party-Front of Turkey (THKP-C).

What led to this incident was the ongoing lawsuit that demanded the execution of other THKP-C guerrillas Deniz Gezmiş, Yusuf Aslan, and Hüseyin İnan. Leftist guerilla Mahir Çayan and his friends kidnapped the Israeli ambassador, Ephraim Elrom, and killed him to prevent the oncoming execution of formerly arrested guerrillas. After the murder of Ephraim Elrom, the Turkish government managed to seize Mahir Çayan in a gunfight and placed him in the Maltepe military prison. THKP-C guerrillas Mahir Çayan, Ulaş Bardakçı, Ziya Yılmaz, and THKO guerrillas Cihan Alptekin and Ömer Ayna managed to escape on 29 November 1971 by digging a tunnel. After their escape, Çayan and his friends kidnapped two English and one Canadian technicians from the Ünye Radar Station in the Turkish city of Ordu on 26 May 1972 to force their demands. They left a memorandum that demanded the halt of the execution of Deniz Gezmiş and two other guerrillas in the combination safe of the three technicians they kidnapped. After the Turkish government's investigations, a local mukhtar, Hasan Yılmaz, told the policemen that Çayan and his friends were headed to Kızıldere. On 29 May 1972, the house the guerrillas were hiding in was besieged by Turkish commando forces. Çayan and his friends refused to surrender and they threatened to kill the hostages. Turkish forces told the guerrillas that they did not believe the hostages were in the house. Çayan and his friends proved the presence of the hostages by showing them from the window. A gunfight broke out, Çayan was killed, and the hostages were shot by the remaining guerrillas. As the fighting continued, the rest of the guerrillas were killed except for Ertuğrul Kürkçü, who managed to survive by hiding in the hayloft. Kürkçü was arrested the next day during the search of the house by commando forces.

The Kızıldere Incident was one of the most infamous events preceding the political violence in Turkey (1976–1980) and it was influential for further guerilla actions and government retaliations. Events such as Bloody Sunday (1969), bombings, robberies, and kidnappings happened but it was responded with the government's stance on gladio and militant activities of right groups, which paved the way to the Turkish coup d'état of 1980.
