= Political violence in Turkey (1976–1980) =

Political violence in Turkey (1968–1980)
- Part of the Cold War
Date	29 December 1968 – 12 September 1980 (peak years: 1976–1980) (11 years, 8 months and 2 weeks)
Location	Turkey
Result	1980 Turkish coup d'état: Resurgence of the Maoist insurgency; Beginning of the PKK insurgency

Belligerents
Right-wing groups: Grey Wolves (MHP); Turkish Revenge Brigade; Turkish mafia; Raiders Organization (MSP); Turkish National Student Union; TÜRK-İŞ; MİSK (MHP); Supported by: Counter-Guerrilla	Left-wing groups: DEV-GENÇ; TİİKP; TKP/ML (TİKKO); THKO; DEV-YOL; THKP-C/MLSPB; THKP-C; Progressive Youth Association (TKP); DİSK; Liberation Movement; People's Path; DEV-SOL

Commanders and leaders
Muhsin Yazıcıoğlu; Alparslan Türkeş; Abdullah Çatlı	İbrahim Kaypakkaya †; Deniz Gezmiş (executed); Mahir Çayan †; Others

Strength
Around 200,000	Around 113,000

Casualties and losses
1,826	2,109
- Total: 5,388 killed, affiliation of 1,983 victims unknown.

Political violence in Turkey became a serious problem in the late 1970s and was even described as a "low-level civil war". Far-left groups such as Revolutionary People's Liberation Party/Front, and separate Maoist groups , also Turkish right-wing ultranationalist gangs (sometimes allied with the state), were responsible for most of the violence. Ultimately, over 5,000 people died in the conflict. The violence lessened for a while after the 1980 Turkish coup d'état and was later overshadowed by the PKK insurgency in 1984.

== Background ==
The Democrat Party, right-wing force that united conservatives, traditionalists, Islamists, nationalists, liberals, and urban bourgeoisie under one roof and was the dominant party throughout the 1950s, was banned after the 1960 coup d'état and its leaders such as prime minister Adnan Menderes were hanged. Intellectuals, politicians and the masses on the right fell into moral defeat as a result of these developments.

With the increase in infrastructure and transportation investments after the 1960 coup, the urban population grew, industrialization accelerated, and workers and their families who earned a living via performing labor became numerous. Class consciousness increased. The Right to unionize was granted with the 1961 Constitution. Under the influence of these developments, the Turkish left strengthened. 1961 Constitution essentially allowed ideological politics. In this environment of freedoms guaranteed, by the constitution students inclined to the Workers' Party of Turkey (Turkish: Türkiye İşçi Partisi, TİP) founded their political associations. Left-wing book and magazines were translated, and political literature became more accessible. This situation became a threat to the right which began to mobilize its own forces to fight against communism.

Due to increasing political tensions and high inflation during social changes in the late 1960s and early 1970s, consumption was restricted to a limited group, and unemployment rose despite the growth of the labor force, and migration to Europe increased due to a lack of jobs (see Gastarbeiter). While the number of unionized workers increased, the number of unemployed people under the age of 30 reached alarming rates. In the 1960s, workers became militant in their struggle for higher wages and better working conditions. The struggle between employers and workers intensified with strikes and lockouts. As a result, in 1967, some unionists left Confederation of Turkish Trade Unions (TÜRK-İŞ) (Turkish: Türkiye İşçi Sendikaları Konfederasyonu, TÜRK-İŞ), which they saw as pro-Justice Party (Turkish: Adalet Partisi, AP), and founded the radical left-wing Confederation of Revolutionary Trade Unions of Turkey (Turkish: Türkiye Devrimci İşçi Sendikaları Konfederasyonu, DİSK). While TÜRK-İŞ was established according to the American model and prioritized political tendencies by concentrating on economic demands; DİSK, on the other hand, got closer to Workers' Party of Turkey (TİP) by claiming that economic demands could be won through political struggle, based on the European example. As a result of this division, TÜRK-İŞ weakened.

With the increase in the number of students, schools and higher education, institutions became gathering places for political groups on the left and right sides.

In the absence of liberal solutions for countries whose main problem was development, such as Turkey, the intellectuals of the period were largely interested in the socialist model. Many intellectuals signed the manifesto proposing a socialist model in the first issue of Yön magazine, published in 1961. Under these influences, changes were taking place in the value system and status scale of ideologies in Turkey in the 1960s. Workers' Party of Turkey won 14 seats in the 1965 general election thanks to the national remnant and gained an important place in politics. Although it received a similar number of votes with the changed election system in the 1969 elections, its presence was reduced to three.

While Turkey, which is also a member of NATO, became a frontline country in the Cold War, various socialist regimes were established through coups in the south and in the Mediterranean region. From the right-wing perspective, while Turkey was surrounded from both the north and south, the loss of state authority in Istanbul for two days, starting in the industrial zones of Kocaeli and Istanbul, during the great workers' protest led by DİSK on 15-16 June 1970, was frightening for the right.

Some of the state elite, out of concern about the rise of the left, supported the far-right. Due to this support, left-leaning writers and journalists claimed that the Grey Wolves (officially the Idealist Hearths, Turkish: Ülkü Ocakları) were established and protected by the state in the late 60s to wage an armed struggle against the left.

In 1975 Süleyman Demirel, chairman of the conservative Justice Party (Turkish: Adalet Partisi, AP) succeeded Bülent Ecevit, chairman of the now social-democratic Republican People's Party (Turkish: Cumhuriyet Halk Partisi, CHP) as Prime Minister. He formed a coalition, the Nationalist Front (Turkish: Milliyetçi Cephe), with Necmettin Erbakan's Islamist National Salvation Party (Turkish: Millî Selamet Partisi, MSP), and Alparslan Türkeş' far-right Nationalist Movement Party (Turkish: Milliyetçi Hareket Partisi, MHP). The MHP used the opportunity to infiltrate state security services, seriously escalating the low-intensity civil war that had been waging between rival factions.

The elections of 1977 had no clear winner, as CHP didn't have a majority to form a government, and the right-wing parties all had to work together to form another coalition. Demirel at first continued the coalition with the Nationalist Front, but in 1978, Ecevit came to power again with the help of defectors from the AP, in a controversial event called the Güneş Motel Incident. In 1979, Demirel once again became prime minister. At the end of the 1970s, Turkey was in an unstable situation with unsolved economic and social problems and facing large strike actions and partial paralysis of parliamentary politics (the Grand National Assembly of Turkey was unable to elect a president during the six months preceding the coup). Since 1969, proportional representation had made it difficult for one party to achieve a parliamentary majority. The interests of the industrial bourgeoisie, who were economically dominant, were opposed by other social classes, such as smaller industrialists, tradesmen, rural notables and landlords, whose interests did not always coincide among themselves. Numerous agricultural and industrial reforms sought by parts of the upper-middle classes were blocked by others. The politicians seemed unable to combat the growing violence in the country. Even the police force was divided, with some police officers becoming members of left-wing and others being members right-wing unions. The left-wing police officers' union Pol-Der, had grown quite large, at one point having 18.000 members. In response, a right-wing police officers' union was formed, and the two unions' members were in conflict. The right and left-wing police officers would frequently report each other for administrative sanctions. The right-wing police members would intimidate and beat citizens that reported right-wing terrorists, and the left-wing police officers would intimidate citizens that reported crimes by left-wing militants, causing chaos.

== Sequence of events ==
Unprecedented political violence erupted in Turkey in the late 1970s. The overall death toll of the 1970s is estimated at 5,000, with nearly ten assassinations per day. Most were members of left-wing and right-wing political organizations, which were then engaged in bitter fighting. The ultranationalist Grey Wolves, the youth organisation of the MHP, claimed they were supporting the security forces. According to the British Searchlight magazine, in 1978 there were 3,319 right-wing attacks, in which 831 were killed and 3,121 wounded. In the central trial against the left-wing organization Devrimci Yol (Revolutionary Path, abbreviated as DEV-YOL) at the Ankara Military Court, the defendants listed 5,388 political killings before the military coup. Among the victims were 1,296 right-wingers and 2,109 left-wingers. The others could not clearly be related. The 1978 Bahçelievler massacre, the 1977 Taksim Square massacre with 35 victims and the 1978 Maraş massacre with over 100 victims are some notable incidents. Martial law was announced following the Maraş massacre in 14 of the then 67 provinces in December 1978. On the eve of the 12 September 1980 coup, martial law had been extended to 20 provinces. Nationalist Movement Party members were also murdered throughout Turkey, in one instant, the Gaziosmanpaşa local chairman for the MHP was murdered alongside his wife and children in Istanbul. MHP minister of Customs Gün Sazak was also assassinated by left-wing militants. . The People's Liberation Party-Front of Turkey claimed responsibility for killing several MHP members, bombing local MHP offices, and bombing police headquarters. In several incidents, members of left-wing organizations were in conflict with each other, with Revolutionary People's Liberation Party/Front compiling a list of incidents where murders occurred within the left, and accusing militant left-wing People's Liberation Party-Front of Turkey of shooting and killing members of other left-wing political organizations, or reporting them to the authorities.

Ecevit was warned about the coming coup in June 1979 by Nuri Gündeş of the National Intelligence Organization (MİT). Ecevit then told his interior minister, İrfan Özaydınlı, who then told Sedat Celasun, one of the five generals who would lead the coup. The deputy undersecretary of the MİT, Nihat Yıldız, was demoted to the London consulate and replaced by a lieutenant general as a result.

== Kurdish separatism ==
The right-wing groups were opposed to Kurdish separatism. Disproportionate numbers of Kurds were part of the left-wing groups. Before the 1980 military coup, the majority of violent clashes were between leftist and rightist groups, though the separatist attacks against the Turkish forces increased afterwards.

An amendment of the electoral law in 1969 kept small parties on both sides to gain any seats in Parliament. This caused a public uprising, including the Kurdish resistance. Multiple Kurdish leftist organizations appeared in Turkey in the 1960s and 1970s that were ready to use violence as a political tool. Violence sparked especially in the second half of the 1970s. Throughout the years, a number of them fell apart or were banned altogether after the 1980 military coup. After becoming increasingly involved in political activism after its foundation in 1978, the Kurdistan Workers' Party (PKK) led by Abdullah Öcalan would rise quickly to be one of the major separatist actors. As a militant political organisation, the PKK claimed 354 lives between the years 1978 and 1980. Most of the victims were ethnic Kurds as they constituted PKK's main target group. For example, feudal leaders were against the PKK's goals and values, which was why the PKK fought against them. Also, the PKK attempted to be the sole leftist power in the region, and thus fought against other leftist groups.

The Kurdistan Worker's Party did not only use violence to mobilise people during this time period. However, their use of violence did appeal to larger crowds, increasing the popularity of the party. By gaining more people to support them, other organisations were not able to gain similar status as the PKK did. Thus, the PKK was the main access of the Kurdish to political participation in Turkey. One way of involving a larger number of people in its activities was to include women, which challenged the traditional gender relations in the country.

== Aftermath ==
Following the ongoing political violence of the 1970s and the Turkish parliament's inability to form a stable government and fulfill its function as legislative, the 12 September Military Coup brought Kenan Evren to power. The parliament was abolished, martial law was declared and a state of emergency was put into place. The period of military dictatorship between 1980 and 1983 constituted a fundamentally transformational period for Turkish society.

The National Security Council became responsible for the close monitoring of society, aimed at those who participated in any form of state resistance in the 1970s. Estimated numbers of the people facing punishment by the state 1980-1983 are listed in the table below.

Custody	650,000
Prosecuted in martial courts	210,000
Imprisoned	80,000
Sentenced	65,000
Tried under threat of capital punishment	6,353
Condemned to capital punishment	> 500
Executed	50
Blacklisted	> 300,000
Banned to travel abroad	388,00
Fired public officials	4,891
Deported	4,509
Forced retirement or resignation	> 20,000
Cancelled Turkish citizenship	15,000

A culture of mutual denunciation was developed among the citizenry and the formation of organisations banned, leading to a nationwide atmosphere of social anxiety and polarization into two groups: those who were innocent and those who were guilty. In addition, nationalism was coupled with Islamization in order to formulate a new Turkish national identity and promote morality. The National Security council owned the public broadcasting channel, Turkish radio and the television institution. Both Islamization and the nationalization of important media channels acted as ways to further discipline the population.

The military coup also allowed for a restructuring of the state; 535 laws were passed in the 1982 Turkish Constitution. Among them were laws that enabled a shift from a state-controlled to a market economy with a developmentalist approach. However, with the 24th January Decisions, real wages dropped significantly and the establishment of small businesses was hampered, whereas the way was paved for larger corporations, new networks of exportation and multinational organisations. A development program for Southeastern Anatolia (Güneydoğu Anadolu Projesi) was established in order to help the dominantly Kurdish population to more economic prosperity but did not include anyone from the region to make the program cooperative and successful. Instead, reforms were designed to be much in favour of the bourgeoisie all while it worsened the situation of the middle class significantly with a plummeting of real wages.

Among other reasons, Kurdish separatism was reinforcing the economic backwardness of the Eastern and Southeastern Anatolia while the economic backwardness of Eastern and Southeastern Anatolia reinforced Kurdish separatism. Terrorist attacks have had an impact on human and physical capital, and what the state spent on countering the movement shifted spendings from the infrastructure and development of the region to the defence. However, this simultaneously marginalised Kurdish who would then be recruited by the PKK as lower-class. Thus, economic backwardness and Kurdish separatism created a vicious circle.

Regarding minority rights and freedoms, there were many setbacks. Exclusionary nationalism was promoted. For the Kurdish, the acknowledgement of their existence and the use of their language were banned entirely. Any type of Kurdish media was forbidden, and publishers were imprisoned. Political parties, trade unions and NGOs were abolished. The Turkish Armed Forces fought against PKK influence in Southeast Anatolia and at the Iraqi border and implemented a guard system in order to make villagers fight against the PKK with them. For Alevis, Islamization acted as an assimilationist state policy because it was Sunni Islam that was practiced. Many mosques were built in Alevi districts and the religious courses offered were all Sunni as well. This marginalization would lead to the 1984 Kurdish-Turkish conflict and the rise of the PKK.

== See also ==
- Politics of Turkey
- Years of Lead (Italy)
- 1971 Turkish military memorandum
- New Çeltek events
- Fatsa#Social Unrest in 1970s - 1980s
- List of assassinated people from Turkey
- List of massacres in Turkey
- Suzerain, a video-game based on these events
- Turkish–Islamic synthesis
- Human rights in Turkey
