= Capital punishment in Turkey =

Capital punishment was abolished in Turkey in 2004, and no prisoners have been executed since October 1984. Before that, over 500 convicts sentenced to death were executed. The method of execution was hanging. Following the Turkish coup attempt in July 2016, the European Union and the Council of Europe warned Turkey that its EU membership accession negotiations and membership in the Council of Europe would be terminated if it reinstated the death penalty.

== History ==
According to Hanz Chiappetta, since the foundation of Turkey in 1923, capital punishment has been carried out 588 times. Turkey's last public execution took place in 1960 in Istanbul.

Prior to 1984, executions would usually occur after military interventions. Adnan Menderes, who served as Prime Minister, was hanged on 17 September 1961 following the 1960 coup d'état, along with two other cabinet members, Fatin Rüştü Zorlu and Hasan Polatkan. Student leaders Deniz Gezmiş, Hüseyin İnan, and Yusuf Aslan were hanged on 6 May 1972 after the 1971 military memorandum.

Between 1972 and 1980, Turkey experienced an eight-year gap wherein no executions were carried out, but this hiatus ended with the hangings of two men, 24-year-old Necdet Adali and 22-year-old Mustafa Pahlivanoglu, who were convicted of terrorism for their roles in the 1980 Turkish coup d'état. The men had appealed for clemency, but Turkey's National Security Council rejected their appeals, and the hangings took place shortly before dawn on 8 October 1980. Between 1980 and 1984, a total of 50 men, including 27 political activists, were executed by Turkish authorities following the coup. The last of these 27, and also the last person to be executed in Turkey, was Hıdır Aslan, who was hanged in Burdur on 25 October 1984.

Twenty-four articles of the 1926 Turkish Penal Code (Law 765) provided for a mandatory death penalty for crimes against the state, the government, and the Constitution and military, as well as for civilian criminal offences like murder and rape. These 24 articles defined a total of 29 offences punishable by death.

=== Abolition ===
By Law 4771 of 9 August 2002 (the 3rd Package for Harmonization with the European Union), the death penalty was abolished for peacetime offences. Law 5218 of 14 July 2004 abolished the death penalty for all crimes. Turkey ratified Protocol No. 13 to the European Convention on Human Rights, overseen by the Council of Europe, in February 2006.

Abdullah Öcalan was also sentenced to be executed in June 1999; however, Turkey commuted his sentence to life imprisonment in October 2002.

=== Proposed reinstatement ===
Since the failed 2016 coup d'état, some politicians have talked about restoring the death penalty. Recep Tayyip Erdoğan, President of Turkey since 2014, announced on 29 October 2016 that the government planned to present a draft law restoring the death penalty to the Turkish Parliament and announced his intent to "countersign it").

After his victory in the constitutional referendum in 2017, Erdogan made favorable statements on the reinstatement of capital punishment, announcing he would discuss the possibility with Devlet Bahçeli of the Nationalist Movement Party (MHP) and the then-Turkish prime minister Binali Yıldırım. In view of this happening, the President of the European Commission Jean-Claude Juncker announced that such an event would mean the end of an eventual Turkish accession to the European Union.

== Public opinion ==
A 2011 poll found 65% of people wanted capital punishment reinstated for "certain crimes".

In 2019, an Opinion Research Corporation survey asked, "Would you support the death penalty for the crimes of child abuse, murder of women and terrorism?", and 71.7% of Turkish respondents said they would.

== Methods and practices ==
Under Article 12 of Law 765, death sentences were to be carried out by hanging after being approved by act of the Grand National Assembly of Turkey (Türkiye Büyük Millet Meclisi), or the TBMM. Within the TBMM, they were reviewed by the Judicial Committee before being voted on by parliament as a whole. This decision had to be ratified by the President, who had the power to commute death sentences on grounds of age or ill-health.

Rather than utilizing gallows that permitted a long drop to break the condemned inmate's neck and render the condemned inmate instantly unconscious, Turkey's gallows were very simple and inexpensive, only permitting a short drop. People convicted of military crimes were executed by firing squad.

According to press coverage of the 1980 hangings of Adali and Pahlivanoglu, the two condemned men were offered the counsel of a Muslim priest and were allowed to kiss a copy of the Quran based on Turkish custom.

== Alternatives ==
The death sentence was replaced by aggravated life imprisonment (ağırlaştırılmış müebbet hapis cezası). According to Article 9 of Law 5275 on the Execution of Sentences these prisoners are held in individual cells in high security prisons and are allowed to exercise in a neighbouring yard one hour per day.
