= Çeltek =

Çeltek is a Turkish word meaning "shepherd's apprentice" and may refer to the following places in Turkey:

== Communities ==
- Çeltek, Aksaray, a village in the district of Aksaray, Aksaray Province
- Çeltek, Gölbaşı, a village in the district of Gölbaşı, Ankara Province
- Çeltek, Vezirköprü, a village in the district of Vezirköprü, Samsun Province
- Çeltek, Yeşilova, a village in the district of Yeşilova, Burdur Province

== Other ==
- Çeltek coal mines, in Suluova District, Amasya Province
