= Yankee =

Term for people from the United States

The term Yankee and its contracted form Yank have several interrelated meanings, all referring to people from the United States. Their various meanings depend on the context, and may refer to New Englanders, the Northeastern United States, the Northern United States, or to people from the US in general. Many of the earlier immigrants to the northeast from Ireland, Italy, Poland, and other regions of Europe used Yankees to refer to English settlers in New England.

Outside the United States, Yank is used informally to refer to a person or thing from the US. It has been especially popular in the United Kingdom, Ireland, South Africa, Australia, and New Zealand where it may be used variously, either with an uncomplimentary overtone, endearingly, or cordially. In the Southern United States, Yankee is a derisive term which refers to all Northerners, and during the American Civil War it was applied by Confederates to soldiers of the Union army in general. Elsewhere in the United States, it largely refers to people from the Northeast or with New England cultural ties, such as descendants of colonial New England settlers, wherever they live. Its sense is sometimes more cultural than geographical, emphasizing the Calvinist Puritan Christian beliefs and traditions of the Congregationalists who brought their culture when they settled outside New England. The regional dialect of Eastern New England English, particularly in the 19th and early 20th century, has been referred to as "Yankee" or "Yankee dialect".

== Etymology and historical usage of the term ==
The meaning of Yankee has varied over time. Its earliest usage was in the 17th century, in New Netherland. In the 18th century, it referred to residents of New England. As early as the 1770s, British people applied the term to any person from the United States, and was often derogatory.

In the 19th century, Americans in the southern United States employed the word in reference to Americans from the northern United States. Historically, it has also been used to distinguish American-born Protestants from later immigrants, such as Catholics of Irish descent.

=== New Netherland origin ===
New Netherland flag

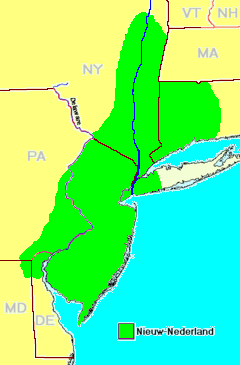
The New Netherland colony in America

The term Yankee is attested as early as 1683. It likely derives from the Dutch name Janneke (lit. 'Little John'), which was popular across New Netherland during the 17th century. The Oxford English Dictionary calls this theory "perhaps the most plausible".

Janneke was used as both a diminutive form of the Dutch name Jan (Dutch: [jɑn]) and as a surname in its own right. After the British replaced the Dutch administration in 1664, it would have been Anglicized as Yankee. Michael Quinion and Patrick Hanks posit that Yankee was therefore "used as a nickname for a Dutch-speaking American in colonial times".

Alternatively, the Online Etymology Dictionary suggests that Yankee may be derived from Jan Kees or Jan Kaas (lit. 'John Cheese'), originally a derogatory Flemish nickname for the Dutch. The Dutch settlers of New Amsterdam may have used this as a disparaging term for the English colonists in Connecticut.

=== New England use ===
Flag of New England

Map of New England

Dutch colonists in New Amsterdam may have been the first to call New Englanders—specifically English colonists in Connecticut—Yankees. In 1758, British General James Wolfe also negatively referred to New England soldiers under his command as Yankees.

The term was not used by New Englanders themselves until 1775. According to Merriam-Webster, New Englanders began to use the term as a self-descriptor after their successes in the battles of Lexington and Concord.

=== Rejected etymologies ===
Many etymologies have been suggested for the word Yankee, but modern linguists generally reject theories that suggest it originated in any Indigenous languages. This includes a theory put forth by a British officer in 1789, who said that it was derived from the Cherokee word eankke meaning "coward"—despite the fact that no such word existed in the Cherokee language. Another theory surmised that the word was borrowed from the Wyandot pronunciation of the French l'anglais, meaning "the Englishman" or "the English language", which was sounded as Y'an-gee.

American musicologist Oscar Sonneck debunked a romanticized false etymology in his 1909 work Report on "The Star-Spangled Banner", "Hail Columbia", "America", "Yankee Doodle". He cited a popular theory that the word came from a tribe called the Yankoos (said to mean "invincible") who were defeated by New Englanders, and transferred their name to the victors as part of an "Indian custom". Sonneck found no evidence such a tradition existed, nor had any settlers ever adopted an Indian name to describe themselves, and concluded there was never a tribe called the Yankoos.

== History ==
=== Yankee settlement in the United States ===
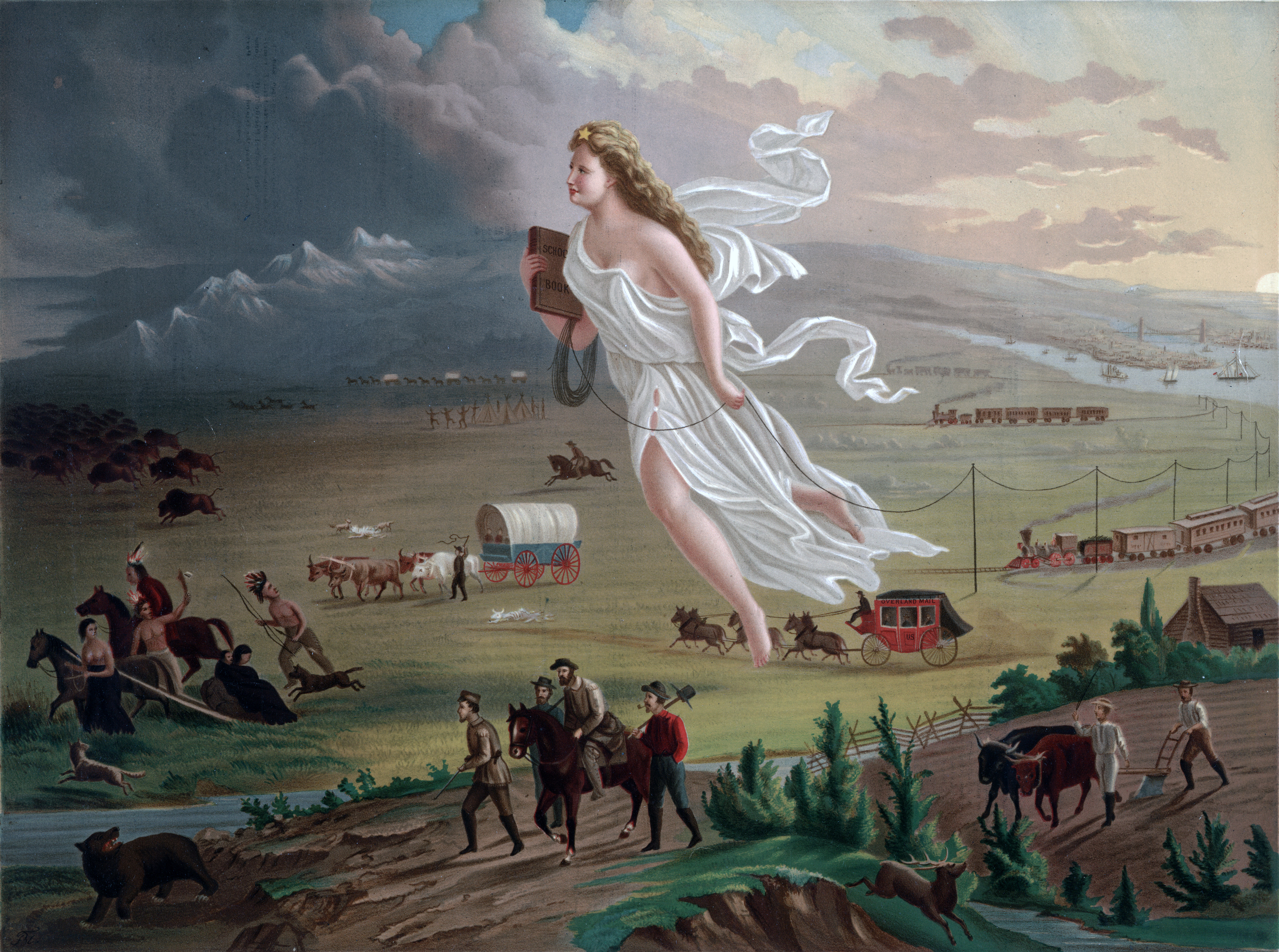
Manifest Destiny, settlement of the United States

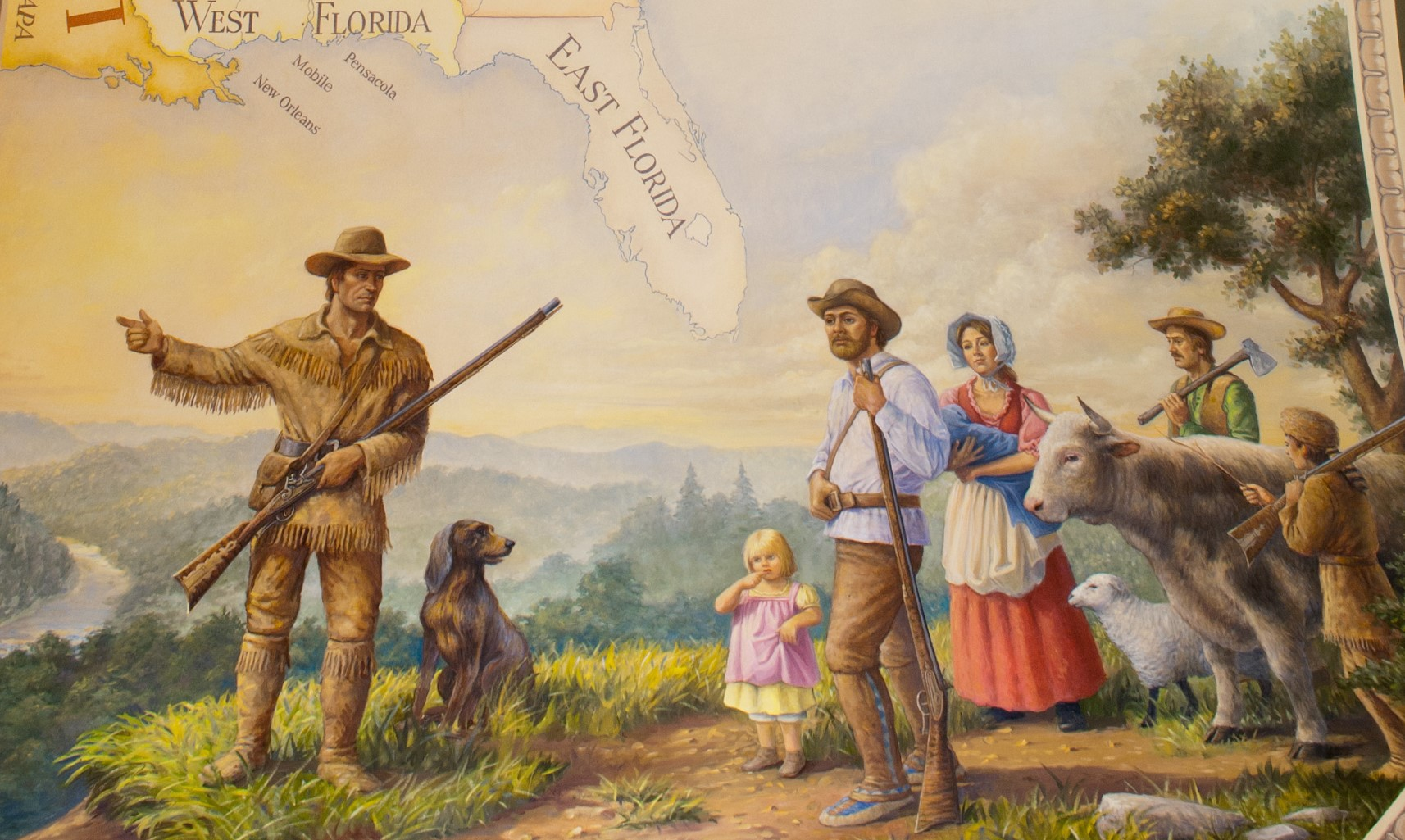
Yankee settlers

The original Yankees diffused widely across the northern United States, leaving their imprints in New York, the Upper Midwest, many taking advantage of water routes by the Great Lakes, and places as far away as Seattle, San Francisco, and Honolulu.

Yankeeism is the general character of the Union. Yankee manners are as migratory as Yankee men. The latter are found everywhere and the former prevail wherever the latter are found. Although the genuine Yankee belongs to New England, the term "Yankee" is now as appropriate to the natives of the Union at large.

Yankees settled other states in various ways: some joined highly organized colonization companies, others purchased groups of land together; some joined volunteer land settlement groups, and self-reliant individual families also migrated. Yankees typically lived in villages consisting of clusters of separate farms. Often they were merchants, bankers, teachers, or professionals.

Village life fostered local democracy, best exemplified by the open town meeting form of government that still exists today in the Northeastern United States. Village life also stimulated mutual oversight of moral behavior and emphasized civic virtue. The Yankees built international trade routes stretching to China by 1800 from the New England seaports of Boston, Salem, Providence, Newport, and New London, among others. Much of the profit from trading was reinvested in the textile and machine tools industries.

=== Post-Independence ===
After 1800, Yankees spearheaded most American reform movements, including those for the abolition of slavery, temperance in use of alcohol, increase in women's political rights, and improvement in women's education. Emma Willard and Mary Lyon pioneered in the higher education of women, while Yankees comprised most of the reformers who went South during Reconstruction in the late 1860s to educate the Freedmen.

Historian John Buenker has examined the worldview of the Yankee settlers in the Midwest:

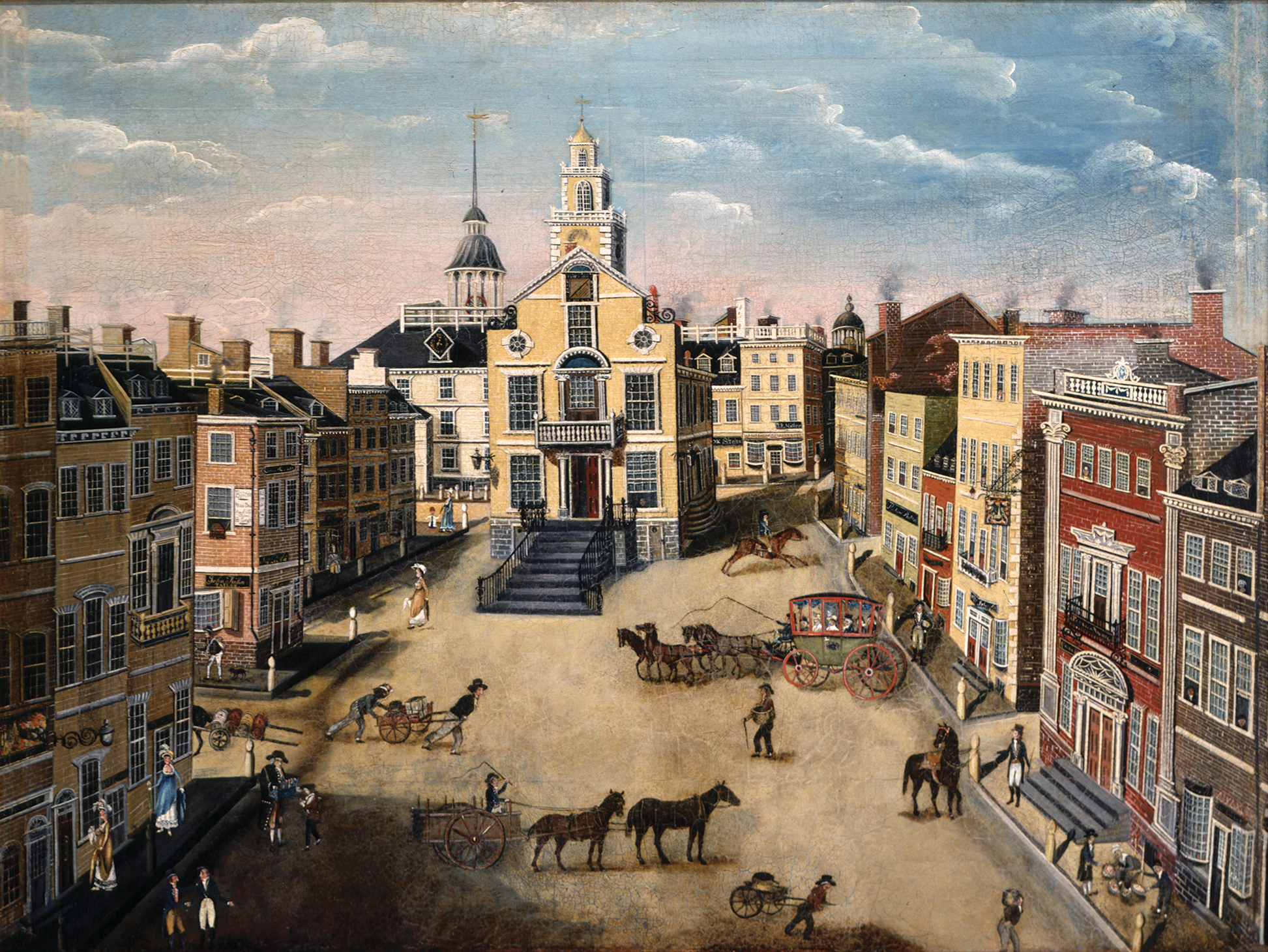
Boston, New England capital

Because they arrived first and had a strong sense of community and mission, Yankees were able to transplant New England institutions, values, and mores, altered only by the conditions of frontier life. They established a public culture that emphasized the work ethic, the sanctity of private property, individual responsibility, faith in residential and social mobility, practicality, piety, public order and decorum, reverence for public education, activists, honest, and frugal government, town meeting democracy, and he believed that there was a public interest that transcends particular and stock ambitions. Regarding themselves as the elect and just in a world rife with sin and corruption, they felt a strong moral obligation to define and enforce standards of community and personal behavior…. This pietistic worldview was substantially shared by British, Scandinavian, Swiss, English-Canadian and Dutch Reformed immigrants, as well as by German Protestants and many of the Forty-Eighters.

Yankees dominated New England, much of upstate New York, and much of the upper Midwest, and were the strongest supporters of the new Republican party in the 1860s. This was especially true for the Congregationalists, Presbyterians, and Methodists among them. A study of 65 predominantly Yankee counties showed that they voted only 40 percent for the Whigs in 1848 and 1852, but became 61–65 percent Republican in presidential elections of 1856 through 1864.

Ivy League universities remained bastions of old Yankee culture until well after World War II, particularly Harvard and Yale.

== Stereotypes ==
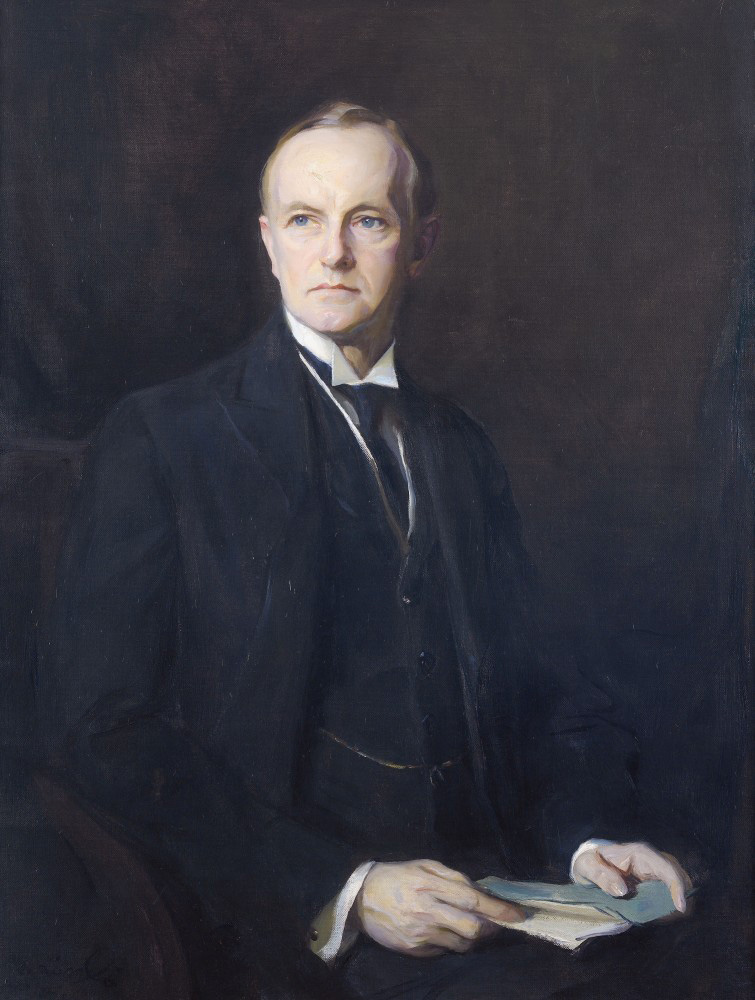
President Calvin Coolidge of New England

President Calvin Coolidge exemplified the modern Yankee stereotype. Coolidge moved from rural Vermont to urban Massachusetts and was educated at elite Amherst College. Yet his flint-faced, unprepossessing ways and terse rural speech proved politically attractive. "That Yankee twang will be worth a hundred thousand votes", explained one Republican leader. Coolidge's laconic ways and dry humor were characteristic of stereotypical rural "Yankee humor" at the turn of the 20th century.

Yankee ingenuity was a worldwide stereotype of inventiveness, technical solutions to practical problems, "know-how," self-reliance, and individual enterprise. The stereotype first appeared in the 19th century. As Mitchell Wilson notes, "Yankee ingenuity and Yankee git-up-and-go did not exist in colonial days." The great majority of Yankees gravitated toward the burgeoning cities of the northeast, while wealthy New Englanders also sent ambassadors to frontier communities where they became influential bankers and newspaper printers. They introduced the term "Universal Yankee Nation" to proselytize their hopes for national and global influence.

== Religion ==
New England Yankees originally followed the Puritan tradition, as expressed in Congregational and Baptist churches. Beginning in the late colonial period, many became Presbyterians, Episcopalians, Methodists, or, later, Unitarians. Strait-laced 17th-century moralism as derided by novelist Nathaniel Hawthorne faded in the 18th century. The First Great Awakening under Jonathan Edwards and others in the mid-18th century, and the Second Great Awakening in the early 19th century under Charles Grandison Finney and others emphasized personal piety, revivals, and devotion to civic duty.

== Historic uses ==
=== Yankee Doodle ===
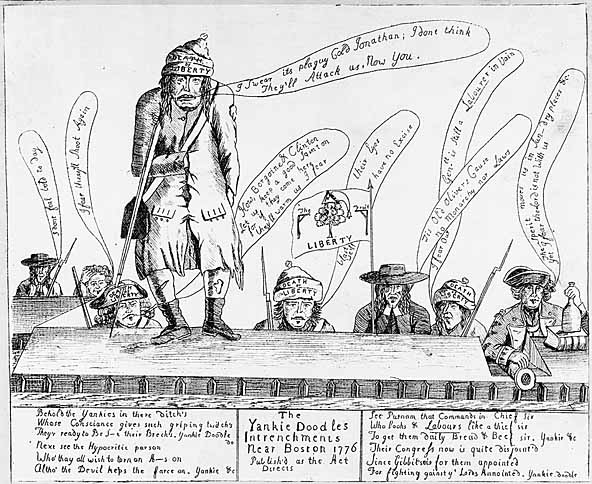
Loyalist newspaper cartoon from Boston ridicules "Yankie Doodles" militia who have encircled the British forces inside the city.

A pervasive influence on the use of the term throughout the years has been the song "Yankee Doodle" which was popular during the American Revolutionary War (1775–1783). The song originated among the British troops during the French and Indian or Seven Years' War, creating a stereotype of the Yankee simpleton who stuck a feather in his cap and thought that he was stylish, but it was rapidly re-appropriated by American patriots after the battles of Lexington and Concord. Today, "Yankee Doodle" is the official state song of Connecticut.

=== Canadian usage ===
An early use of the term outside the United States was in the creation of Sam Slick the "Yankee Clockmaker" in a newspaper column in Halifax, Nova Scotia, in 1835. The character was a plain-speaking American who becomes an example for Nova Scotians to follow in his industry and practicality; his uncouth manners and vanity were qualities that his creator detested. The character was developed by Thomas Chandler Haliburton, and it grew between 1836 and 1844 in a series of publications.

=== Damn Yankee ===
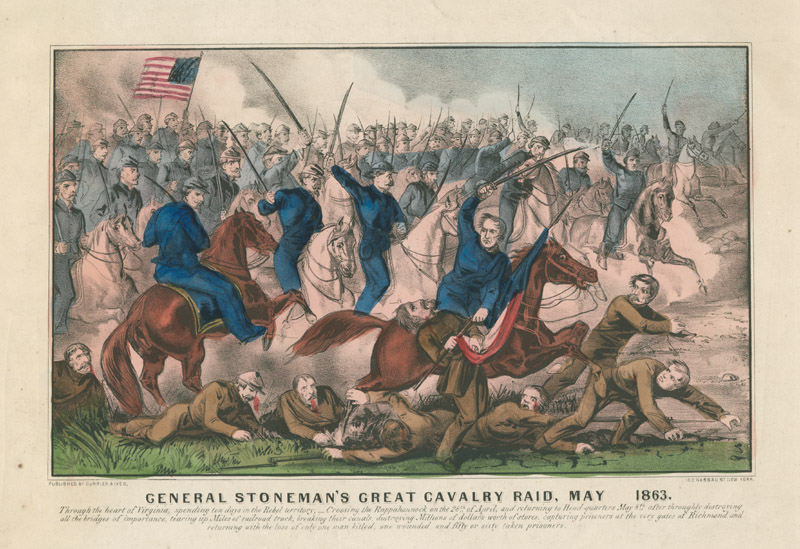
A Yankee cavalry raid

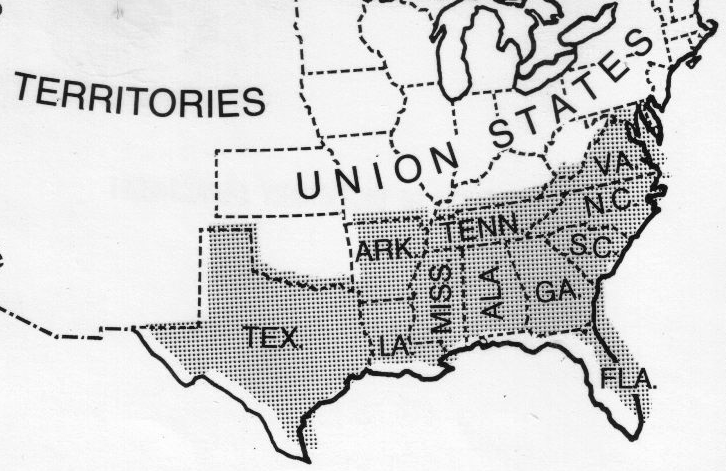
American Civil War map, Federal Union and Southern States

The damned Yankee usage dates from 1812. Confederates popularized it as a derogatory term for their Northern enemies during and after the American Civil War (1861–1865). Rhode Island Governor Bruce Sundlun had been a pilot in World War II, and he named his B-17F bomber Damn Yankee because a crewman from North Carolina nicknamed him with that epithet.

== Contemporary uses ==
=== In the United States ===
The term Yankee can have many different meanings within the United States that are contextually and geographically dependent. Traditionally, Yankee was most often used to refer to a New Englander descended from the settlers of the region, thus often suggesting Puritanism and thrifty values. By the mid-20th century, some speakers applied the word to any American inhabiting the area north of the Mason–Dixon line, though usually with a specific focus still on New England. New England Yankee might be used to differentiate. However, within New England itself, the term still refers more specifically to old-stock New Englanders of English descent. For example:

Certainly the Irish have for years complained of Yankee discrimination against them.

— William F. Whyte

There were no civil rights groups then. Even the Federal Government was controlled by bigoted Yankees and Irish who banded together against the Italian immigrant.

— Fred Langone

The one anomaly of this era was the election of Yankee Republican Leverett Saltonstall as governor in 1938, and even then Saltonstall jokingly attributed his high vote totals in Irish districts to his 'South Boston face'.

— Stephen Puleo

In the Southern United States, the term is used in derisive reference to any Northerner, especially one who has migrated to the South and maintains derisive attitudes towards Southerners and the Southern way of life. Alabama lawyer and author Daniel Robinson Hundley describes the Yankee as such in Social Relations in Our Southern States:

Yankee with all these is looked upon usually as a term of reproach—signifying a shrewd, sharp, chaffering, oily-tongued, soft-sawdering, inquisitive, money-making, money-saving, and money-worshipping individual, who hails from Down East, and who is presumed to have no where else on the Globe a permanent local habitation, however ubiquitous he may be in his travels and pursuits.

Senator J. William Fulbright of Arkansas pointed out as late as 1966, "The very word 'Yankee' still wakens in Southern minds historical memories of defeat and humiliation, of the burning of Atlanta and Sherman's March to the Sea, or of an ancestral farmhouse burned by Quantrill's Raiders". Ambrose Bierce defines the term in The Devil's Dictionary as: "In Europe, an American. In the Northern States of our Union, a New Englander. In the Southern States the word is unknown. (See DAMNYANK.)"

Humorously drawn distinctions, often attributed to E. B. White:

To foreigners, a Yankee is an American.
To Americans, a Yankee is a Northerner.
To Northerners, a Yankee is an Easterner.
To Easterners, a Yankee is a New Englander.
To New Englanders, a Yankee is a Vermonter.
And in Vermont, a Yankee is somebody who eats pie for breakfast.*

- A variant ending with "eats it with a knife" has been attributed to Steve Sherman, the author of the 1985 book Basic Yankee

The New York Yankees, a Major League Baseball team, were originally the New York Highlanders, but were nicknamed the "Yankees" by journalists because "Yankees" was easier to fit in newspaper headlines. Their rivalry with the Boston Red Sox (originally the Boston Americans) can make the utterance of the term "Yankee" unwelcome, especially to the most dedicated Red Sox fans living in the northeastern United States.

The term Swamp Yankee is sometimes used in rural Rhode Island, Connecticut, and southeastern Massachusetts to refer to Protestant farmers of moderate means and their descendants, although it is often regarded as a derogatory term. Scholars note that the famous Yankee "twang" survives mainly in the hill towns of interior New England, though it is disappearing even there.

Mark Twain's 1889 novel A Connecticut Yankee in King Arthur's Court popularized the word as a nickname for residents of Connecticut, and Connecticut Air National Guard unit 103d Airlift Wing is nicknamed "The Flying Yankees."

=== In other countries ===
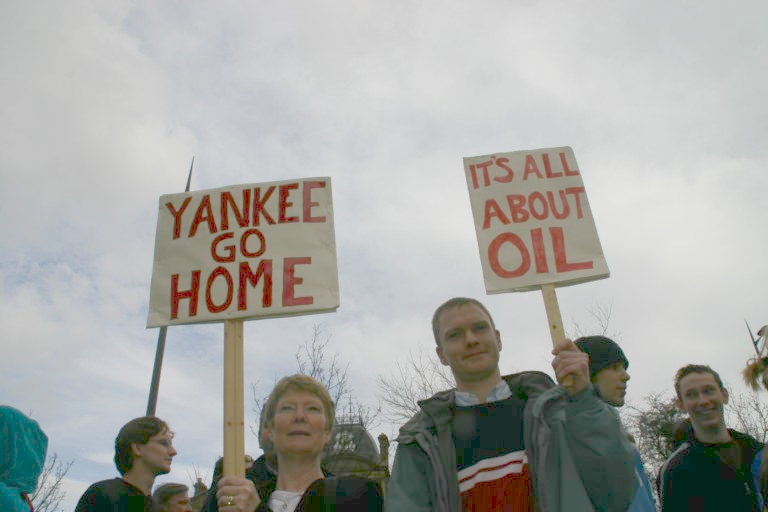
"Yankee, go home", anti-American banner in Liverpool, United Kingdom

The shortened form Yank is used as a derogatory, pejorative, playful, or colloquial term for Americans in Britain, Australia, Canada, South Africa, Ireland, and New Zealand. The full Yankee may be considered mildly derogatory, depending on the country. The Spanish variation yanqui is used in Latin American Spanish, often derogatorily. Venezuelan Spanish has the word pitiyanqui derived around 1940 from petit yankee or petit yanqui, a derogatory term for those who profess an exaggerated and often ridiculous admiration for anything from the United States.

In Australia, the term seppo, shortened from traditional rhyming slang yank ==> septic tank, is sometimes used as a pejorative reference to Americans.

In Finland, the word jenkki is sometimes used to refer to any American citizen, and Jenkkilä or Jenkit refers to the United States itself. It is not considered offensive or anti-American, but rather a colloquial expression. In Sweden, the word jänkare is a derivative of Yankee that is used to refer to both American citizens and classic American cars from the 1950s that are popular in rural Sweden.

==== Japan ====
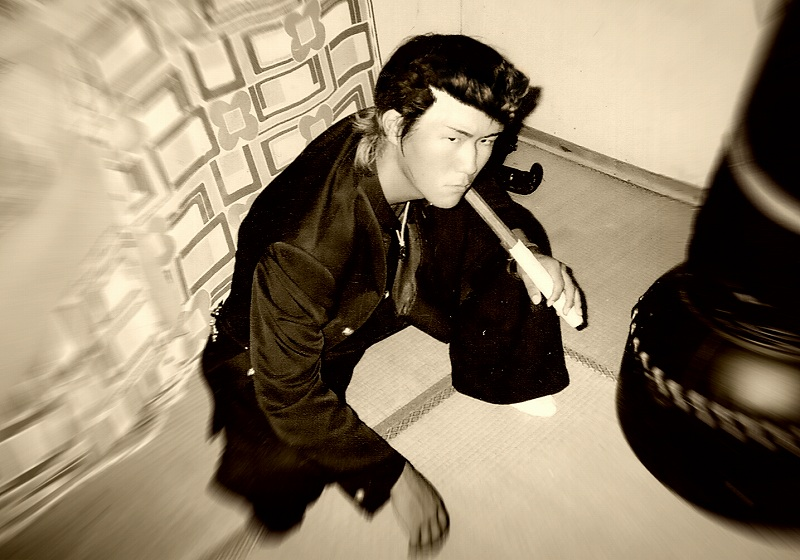
A man dressed as a 1990s Japanese yankī (2015)

In the late 19th century, the Japanese were called "the Yankees of the East" in praise of their industriousness and drive to modernization. In Japan, the term yankī (ヤンキー) has been used since the late 1970s to refer to a type of delinquent youth associated with motorcycle gangs and frequently sporting dyed blond hair.

==== South Korea ====
Around the American occupation of Korea and the Korean War periods, Korean black markets that sold smuggled American goods from military bases were called "yankee markets" (Korean: 양키시장). The term "yankee" is now generally viewed as an anti-American slur in South Korea, and is often used in the exclamation "Yankee go home!" (『양키 고 홈!』).

==== Turkey ====
In Turkey, the term "yankee" is tied with anti-American and anti-imperialist ideologies dating back to the Cold War. The phrase "Yankee go home!" was popularized locally by leftist student movements during the 1968 movement in Turkey to protest the presence of the U.S. Sixth Fleet and American military bases in Turkey. Today the slogan and the term remain a fixture among nationalist and anti-atlanticist groups such as the Youth Union of Turkey and the Patriotic Party's youth wing, the Vanguard Youth. These factions have chanted the slogan while protesting and physically assaulting off-duty U.S. military personnel by placing white sacks over their heads during a naval port visit of the USS Wasp in İzmir.

== See also ==
- Dixie, a term used to refer to the Southern United States
- Brother Jonathan
- Nutmegger
- Carpetbagger, Northerners in the South during Reconstruction
- 26th Maneuver Enhancement Brigade (Yankee Division)
- Jonkheer
- Anti-Americanism
- Yankee Doodle Dandy
- Yankee ingenuity
- Yanks Go Home, British sitcom
- Brit
- Canuck
- Aussie
- Kiwi
- Boer
- Farang
- WASP
- Gringo
