= Marxist–Leninist Armed Propaganda Unit =

Marxist–Leninist organization in Turkey

- Marksist Leninist Silahlı Propaganda Birliği
- Dates active: 1975–present
- Active regions: Turkey, Syria
- Ideology: Communism; Marxism–Leninism
- Part of: Peoples' United Revolutionary Movement; International Freedom Battalion
- Wars: the political violence in Turkey (1976–80), the Kurdish–Turkish conflict and the Syrian Civil War

The Marxist–Leninist Armed Propaganda Unit (Turkish: Marksist Leninist Silahlı Propaganda Birliği, abbreviated as MLSPB), known fully as the People's Liberation Party-Front of Turkey/Marxist–Leninist Armed Propaganda Unit (THKP-C/MLSPB) is a Marxist–Leninist organization in Turkey. The group is a split from the People's Liberation Party-Front of Turkey. It was among the founding members of the Peoples' United Revolutionary Movement, formed in March 2016, with the Kurdistan Workers' Party and seven other socialist organizations.

== Activity ==
=== 1980s ===
In April 1980, members of the group shot dead an American naval officer and his driver. Chief Petty Officer Sam Novello and his driver, Ali Sabri Baytar, were shot dead in Turkey by three assailants who then were captured while trying to escape on motorcycle. One assailant was severely wounded during the capture and died later, the remaining two were sentenced to death by a military court and executed on June 25, 1981.

=== Involvement in Syrian Civil War ===
As MLSPB-Revolutionary Front (Turkish: MLSPB-Devrim Cephesi), the group has participated in the Syrian Civil War through fighting alongside the Kurdish People's Protection Units against the Islamic State of Iraq and the Levant. MLSPB-DC joined the internationalist armed organizations supporting the YPG, the United Freedom Forces and the International Freedom Battalion. A battalion was created by Devrimci Karargâh and MLSPB-DC named after Alper Çakas, an MLSPB-DC fighter killed while fighting in Rojava.

=== Banners used by MLSPB-DC ===

Banner of Betül Altındal Taburu

Banner of Serpil Polat Taburu

== See also ==
- People's Liberation Party-Front of Turkey
  - Devrimci Yol
    - Revolutionary People's Liberation Party/Front
  - Syrian Resistance
