= Hıdır Aslan =

Turkish rebel

- Born: 1958; Hozat, Tunceli Province, Turkey
- Died: 25 October 1984 (aged 26); Burdur, Turkey
- Cause of death: Execution by hanging
- Status: Executed
- Allegiance: Devrimci Yol
- Motive: Political
- Conviction: Murder
- Penalty: Death

Hıdır Aslan (1958 – 25 October 1984) was a Kurdish rebel in Turkey and member of Devrimci Yol who was sentenced to death and executed by hanging.

He was born 1958 in Hozat, Tunceli Province. Due to his success at the secondary school in his hometown, he was sent to Ankara for high school. He got interested in politics during his high school years. For his participation in a political incident, he was tried and imprisoned for seven months. In 1978, he moved to İzmir, where he was involved in armed actions of Devrimci Yol, an illegal Marxist-Leninist movement. Following a week of confrontations between the workers class and the Turkish authorities, Aslan was arrested on 26 February 1980 in İzmir and put in prison in Buca. He was accused of murdering three law enforcement officers. Following trials lasting for four years, he was sentenced to death along with two other comrades. At the end he was convicted of being the leader of the local Devirmci Yol but was not found guilty for a murder. He was hanged on the 25 October 1984 in the prison of Burdur. The European Parliament as well as Amnesty International condemned the fact that he was not charged of a violent crime, but for his opposition to the current government.

He was the 27th person to be hanged after the coup d'état on the 12 September 1980, and became the last person to be executed by Turkey. Turkish Grand National Assembly suspended all death penalty cases for approval after his execution. In conformity with European Convention on Human Rights, the parliament enacted on 3 August 2002 abolishment of the death penalty in all instances, including wartime.
