= Şirin Cemgil =

Turkish lawyer (1945–2009)

Sirin Yazıcıoğlu Cemgil
- Born: 11 May 1945; Buldan, Denizli
- Died: 17 April 2009 (aged 63); Duisburg, Germany
- Burial place: Karacaahmet Cemetery, Istanbul
- Education: Ankara University
- Occupation: Lawyer
- Known for: 1968 Turkish student movement
- Children: 1

Sirin Yazıcıoğlu Cemgil (11 May 1945; Buldan, Denizli, Turkey – 17 April 2009; Duisburg, Germany) was a Turkish lawyer; she was a significant activist in the 1968 student movement.

== Biography ==
Actively involved in the 1968 student movement, she participated in the Turkish Workers' Party and the Federation of Clubs of Opinion.

Whilst she was a law student at Ankara University, she married Sinan Cemgil, the symbolic persona of the 1968 movement and student of Middle East Technical University Architecture department, on February 8, 1969. On January 28, 1970, she gave birth to their son, who was named Taylan in honor of Taylan Özgur. After graduating she worked as a lawyer for a while. She took on the cases of progressive-democrats who were being prosecuted on political cases. She was imprisoned after the 1971 Turkish military memorandum. Her husband Sinan Cemgil, was shot during gendarme raid in the Nurhak Mountains in Kahramanmaraş, where he headed with Deniz Gezmiş and his friends to prepare for the guerilla battle.

Following her husband's death, Cemgil married Mehmet Özler which lasted for a few years. She got arrested after the 1980 Turkish coup d'état and spent two years in prison. When she was released in 1981, she left the country via political exile. She lived in Duisburg, Germany for 27 years. She died of poisoning due to intestinal knotting on April 17, 2009. She was buried in Istanbul's Karacaahmet Cemetery.

== See also ==
- People's Liberation Army of Turkey
