= Bloody May Day (1977) =

Attack on the Labor Day celebration on the 1 May 1977 in Istanbul, Turkey

- Part of political violence in Turkey (1976–1980)
- The "worker that lifts the world on their palms" (Turkish: dünyayı avuçlarında yükselten işçi) logo that was prepared for 1 May 1977 demonstrations
- Native name: Kanlı 1 Mayıs; 1 Mayıs Katliamı
- Location: 41°02′13″N 28°59′09″E; Taksim Square, Beyoğlu, Istanbul
- Date: 1 May 1977
- Target: Civilians, leftists
- Deaths: 36 (Described by the morgue) 31 (Explained by the prosecutor)
- Injuries: 136
- Accused: Counter-Guerrilla, right-wing groups

The Bloody May Day (Turkish: Kanlı 1 Mayıs, lit. 'Bloody 1 May' or 1 Mayıs Katliamı, '1 May Massacre') was an attack on leftist demonstrators on 1 May 1977 (International Workers' Day) in Taksim Square, Istanbul, Turkey. Casualty figures vary between 31 and 36 people killed with 126 to 220 injured. Over 500 demonstrators were later detained by the security forces, and 98 were indicted. None of the perpetrators were caught, although suspicion soon fell on the Counter-Guerrilla and associated right-wing groups. The massacre was part of the wave of political violence in Turkey in the late 1970s.

== Background ==
In the Ottoman Empire, the first celebration of Labour Day was organized in Skopje in 1909. In Istanbul, Labour Day was first celebrated in 1912. No celebrations could be organized between 1928 and 1975. On 1 May 1976 the Confederation of Revolutionary Trade Unions of Turkey (DISK) organized a rally at Taksim Square with mass participation.

Rumours that Labour Day 1977 would involve clashes between different leftist parties were circulated by the Turkish press before the rally, once again organized by DISK.

== The event ==
The number of participants in the Labour Day celebrations on Taksim Square in 1977 is usually estimated at 500,000. Many participants and in particular the Maoist bloc had not even entered the square when shots were heard. Most witnesses stated that they came from the building of the water supply company (Sular İdaresi) and the Sheraton Hotel (re-branded in 1996 as the Intercontinental Hotel and now known as the Marmara Hotel), the tallest building in Istanbul in 1977. Subsequently, the security forces entered with armoured vehicles making much noise with their sirens and explosives. They also hosed the crowd with pressurized water. People tried to escape through Kazancı Yokuşu, the nearest exit from the square, but a police vehicle blocked their escape route. Most casualties were caused by the panic that the police intervention created.

=== Casualties ===
The figures on the casualties vary between 34 and 42 persons killed and 126 and 220 persons injured. An official indictment against 98 participants in the celebrations presented 34 victims' names. (Note: These include: Meral Özkol, Mültezim Oltulu (Mürtezim Örtülü), Ahmet Gözükara, Ziya Baki, Bayram Eği (Eyi), Diran Nigiz (Negis), Ramazan Sarı, Hacer İpek (Saman), Hamdi Toka, Nazan Ünaldı, Jale Yeşilnil, Bayram Çatak (Çıtak), Rasim Elmaz (Elmas), Mahmut Atilla Özbelen (Özveren), Leyla Altıparmak, Ercüment Gürkut, Kenan Çatak, Mustafa Elmas, Hatice Altun, Kahraman Alsancak, Kadriye Duman, Aleksandros Konteas (Kontuas), Hüseyin Kırgın, Mehmet Ali Genç, Ali Sıdal, Ömer Narman, Sibel Açıkalın, Garabet Ayhan, Hikmet Özkürkçü, Nazmi Arı, Kadir Balcı (Bağcı) and Niyazi Darı) The Confederation of Revolutionary Trade Unions (DISK) prepared a list with 36 names. (Note: This list included the names of Ali Yeşilgül, Mustafa Ertan, Yücel Elbistanlı, Tevfik Beysoy, Bayram Sürücü, Özcan Gürkan ve Hülya Emecan) Fahrettin Erdoğan, the press advisor for DISK, concluded that these names taken together would raise the death toll to 42.

On the day of the incident, Istanbul Radio Station announced that 34 people had been killed and 126 injured. According to the autopsy reports, only four victims had been killed by bullets. In three cases the cause of death could either be a bullet or injuries to the head and 27 victims had been crushed. Several witnesses stated that Meral Özkol had been overrun by an armoured vehicle.

== List of Deceased People ==
- Kahraman Alsancak
- Hasan Yıldırım
- Ziya Baki
- Niyazi Darı
- M. Atilla Özbelen
- Leyla Altıparmak
- Ömer Narman
- Mustafa Elmas
- Hikmet Özkürkçü
- Kenan Çatak
- Bayram Cıtak
- Hüseyin Kırkın
- Meral Özkol
- Diran Nergis
- Nazan Ünaldi
- Kıymet Duman
- Rasim Elmas
- Nazmi Ar
- Bayram İyi
- Ahmet Gözükara
- Ercüment Günkut
- Aleko Konteus
- Mehmet Ali Genç
- Hacer İpek Saman
- Sibel Açıkalın
- Karabet Akyan
- Jale Yeşilmi
- Kadir Balcı
- Hamdi Toka
- Hülya Emecan
- Bayram Sürücü
- Mustafa Ertan
- Ali Yeşilgül
- Yücel Erlistanlı
- Özcan Gürkan
- Tevfik Beysoy

=== Legal measures ===
None of the perpetrators were caught and brought to justice. After the incident, over 500 demonstrators were detained, and 98 were indicted. Among the 17 defendants, who had been put in pre-trial detention, three were released before the first hearing and nine were released at the first hearing on 7 July 1977. The remaining prisoners were released soon afterwards. The trial ended in acquittal on 20 October 1989. Various sources stated that from the roof of the Water Supply Company, some 20 snipers were detained by the gendarmerie and handed over to the police. However, none of them appeared in the records of the police. This information comes from the prosecutor investigating the Taksim Square Massacre, Çetin Yetkin. He said that Lieutenant Abdullah Erim made the detentions and handed the detainees over to the police officers Muhsin Bodur and Mete Altan (who after the military intervention of 12 September 1980 worked in the political department of Istanbul Police HQ). Both officers rejected the claim that they had been involved.

After three months of investigation, the prosecutor Çetin Yetkin was appointed elsewhere and resigned. Çetin Yetkin claimed that a sack with explosives had been handed over to the police, but later disappeared. Similarly the lawyer Rasim Öz alleged that he had shot a film of the incident showing many things including the snipers on the roof of the Water Supply Company. He had handed it over to the prosecutor's office, but it had been "lost" at Istanbul Police HQ.

Hope of legal recourse finally fizzled out due to the statute of limitations; a deliberate tack by the culprits, according to Öz.

=== Suspected involvement by Counter-Guerrilla ===
Ever since the Taksim Square Massacre, the fact that none of the perpetrators were caught and brought to justice has fueled allegations that the Turkish branch of Operation Gladio, the Counter-Guerrilla, was involved. One of the first persons to raise such allegations was the then leader of the opposition Bülent Ecevit. At a meeting in İzmir, he said on 7 May: "Some organizations and forces within the State, but outside the control of the democratic State of law, have to be taken under control without losing time. The counter-guerrilla is running an offensive and has a finger in the 1 May incident." Later he declined to comment on the incident, just like the then Prime Minister Süleyman Demirel. But in a confidential letter Demirel sent to Ecevit, he warned his rival that he might become the victim of the same circles, if he would speak at Taksim Square on 3 June 1977. The letter that was disclosed by Ecevit warned that shots might be fired from the Sheraton Hotel. The forces to conduct such an attack in order to spoil the stability of Turkey Demirel were suspected to be "illegal communist or terrorist organizations" or "foreign enterprises or international terrorist organizations" that had been encouraged by the incidents on Taksim Square on 1 May 1977.

Since the beginning, the CIA has been suspected of involvement. After the incident, Ali Kocaman, chair of the trade union Oleyis, stated that police officers and Americans had been in the Sheraton (later known as the Intercontinental) Hotel that had been closed to the public for that day. Bülent Uluer, the then Secretary General of the Revolutionary Youth Federation (Turkish: Devrimci Gençlik) said on 2 May 1977: "Most victims were among us. About 15 of our friends died. This was a plan of the CIA, but not the beginning nor the end. To solve these incidents, one has to look at it from the angle."

Former Turkish prime minister Bülent Ecevit recalled he had learned of the existence of Counter-Guerrilla, the Turkish "stay-behind" armies for the first time in 1974. At the time, the commander of the Turkish army, General Semih Sancar, had allegedly informed him the US had financed the unit since the immediate post-war years, as well as the National Intelligence Organization (Turkish: Millî İstihbarat Teşkilâtı, MIT). Ecevit declared he suspected Counter-Guerrilla's involvement in the 1977 Taksim Square massacre in Istanbul, The next year, the demonstrators were met with bullets. According to Ecevit, the shooting lasted for twenty minutes, yet several thousand policemen on the scene did not intervene. This mode of operation recalls the June 20, 1973 Ezeiza massacre in Buenos Aires, when the Argentine Anticommunist Alliance (aka Triple A), founded by José López Rega (a P2 member), opened up fire on the left-wing Peronists.

According to an article in the Kurtuluş magazine, MIT deputy chief Hiram Abas was present on the May Day massacre. (Swiss historian Daniele Ganser says that Abas was a CIA agent; the CIA's station chief in Istanbul, Duane Clarridge, spoke glowingly of him.). The Sheraton Hotel, from which the shots were fired, belonged to ITT Corporation, which had already been involved in financing the September 11, 1973 coup against Salvador Allende in Chile and was on good terms with the CIA. Hiram Abas had been trained in the US in covert action operations and as an MIT agent first gained notoriety in Beirut, where he co-operated with the Mossad from 1968 to 1971 and carried out attacks, "targeting left-wing youths in the Palestinian camps and receiving bounty for the results he achieved in actions".

== See also ==
- List of massacres in Turkey
- 2013 Taksim Gezi Park protests in Turkey
