= New Çeltek events =

Turkish workers' protest

New Çeltek events or the New Çeltek resistance is a workers' protest that started with the strike of the workers in the New Çeltek mining area in Amasya during the pre-1980 coup and grew with the intervention of the soldiers.

== About New Çeltek ==
New Çeltek, located in the Suluova district of Amasya, is a mining region. The story of New Çeltek in the field of production begins in 1955. It has a coal mine that has been operating since 1955. In addition, Suluova sugar factory was established in the region in the same year. Beet is needed for sugar, high heat, namely lignite, is needed to turn beet into sugar, and it is stated that all of them are found in these soils.

== Development of events ==
In 1975, with the initiative of mining engineers, the Maden-İş Union was established. In New Çeltek, the employer did not accept the demands of the workers and unions and the workers decided to go on strike. The strike ended at the end of 23 days with the employer's promise that all demands of the workers would be met. After the strike ended successfully for the workers, important developments took place. Organizations in the form of committees started among the local people about the way employers followed in hiring and selling coal. Production and consumption were carried out in line with the decisions taken by the committee. New Çeltek workers celebrated May 1 in 1976 and 1977 in their own factories, they participated in Taksim May 1 in 1978 as Yeraltı Maden-İş. They were wearing work clothes, hard hats and pickaxes.

== 1980 resistance ==
Collective bargaining negotiations began again in 1980. Employers argued that none of the miners' demands could be met because the business would suffer from it. The miner then went on strike again. But employers tried to prevent this strike by closing the mines. This, too, failed as the local people did not surrender and occupied the quarries with a 64-day resistance. Workers continued production during this time, selling the coal they produced to people's committees and youth associations. The mines produced more during this time than had been done up to that time. Strike and resistance in New Çeltek; It spread to Divriği, Bigadiç, Cizre, Murgul and Aşkale. But in the meantime, the 1980 Coup took place. The mines were closed by the military forces, the occupation and the strike were ended. The workers who supported and initiated it were detained. He was subjected to various tortures. Some of the workers who were tortured died, and many of the rest were paralyzed and crippled. The workers who were decided to be arrested were collectively included in the Devrimci Yol case. Some were sentenced to death.

== Witnesses' testimony ==
One of the most important witnesses, Elif Er Korkmaz, who died in 2011, described the events as follows:

"They beat children, they beat revolutionaries," he said. Having said that, I went to save the revolutionaries, I could not save myself. I slept for 8 years, got 20 years. Why should I regret? I went there for my children. Nobody fooled me, nobody took me. I went out of my mind. I'll do it again, I'll do it as long as I can."

Grup Yorum commemorated this disaster with the song "Madenciye Ağıt" in the album Gel ki Şafaklar Tutuşsun, which was released the same year.

== See also ==
- Çeltek coal mines
