= Harun Karadeniz =

Turkish social reformer and writer (1942–1975)

Harun Karadeniz (1942, in Armutlu, Alucra – 15 August 1975, in Istanbul) was a Turkish political activist and author. He was the student leader of the late 1960s generation in Turkey and the chair of the Student Union of Istanbul Technical University. Together with other prominent student leaders such as Deniz Gezmiş, he was one of the student leaders who organized the famous 1968 protest against the American Navy's Sixth Fleet arriving at the Port of Istanbul, although he was initially against protesting at the docks themselves.

Karadeniz suffered cancer when he was in detention after the 1971 military coup in Turkey. He was not allowed medical treatment during his imprisonment, which eventually led to the spread of the cancer. Despite medical treatment in London, he died at age 33.

His most well-known and influential work is his 1968 autobiographical book Olaylı Yıllar ve Gençlik ("Eventful Years and Youth"). Karadeniz's other works include Eğitim Üretim İçindir ("Education is for Production"), Devrimcinin Sözlüğü ("The Dictionary of the Revolutionary"), Yaşamımdan Acı Dilimler ("Bitter Stories from My Life"), Kapitalsiz Kapitalistler ("Capitalists Without Capital"), and Emekçinin Kitaplığı ("The Bookshelf of the Worker"), among others.

== See also ==
- Deniz Gezmiş
