= Cihan Alptekin =

Turkish revolutionary and militant (1947–1972)

- Born: 1947; Yeniyol, Ardeşen, Rize, Turkey
- Died: 30 March 1972 (aged 25); Kızıldere, Niksar, Tokat, Turkey
- Occupation: Politician

Cihan Alptekin (1947 – 30 March 1972) was a Turkish revolutionary and militant who was a leader in left-wing organisations such as People's Liberation Army of Turkey, and the Revolutionary Youth Federation of Turkey, a Marxist organisation. He was active in the late 1960s and early 1970s, when he was killed.

He went to the DFLP military camps in Baqaa in Jordan in July 1969 for military training. Soon after he returned to Turkey he was arrested and jailed. In November 1971 he escaped the Maltepe Military Prison along with his comrades Mahir Çayan and Ulaş Bardakçı. He was a Hamsheni (Armenian Muslim).

In January 1972, he met with Mahir Çayan in Ankara in an attempt to help Hüseyin İnan, Deniz Gezmiş and Yusuf Aslan, who were on death row, to escape from prison. They kidnapped British technicians from the NATO base in Ünye and brought them to Kızıldere in an attempt to trade them off for their comrades on death row. This was refused by the government, which subsequently located them in Kızıldere with the coordination of the CIA. They were bombed and killed along with the hostages.
