= People's Liberation Army of Turkey – Revolutionary Path of Turkey =

People's Liberation Army of Turkey-Revolutionary Path of Turkey (Turkish: Türkiye Halk Kurtulus Ordusu-Türkiye Devriminin Yolu) was a splinter group of the People's Liberation Army of Turkey (THKO). People's Liberation Army of Turkey-Revolutionary Path of Turkey appeared in 1975.
