= Communist Party of Kurdistan (Turkey) =

Communist Party of Kurdistan Partiya Komunistê Kurdistan
- Abbreviation: KKP
- Leader: Mehmet Baran
- Founded: 1982
- Split from: TKEP
- Ideology: Communism; Kurdish self-determination

Party flag

Website
- http://partiyakomunistekurdistan.org

The Communist Party of Kurdistan (Kurdish: Partiya Komunistê Kurdistan; Turkish: Kürdistan Komünist Partisi; abbreviated KKP) is a banned political party in Turkey, founded in 1982 as the Kurdish branch of the Communist Labour Party of Turkey (TKEP). Between 1980 and 1982, the TKEP had a Kurdistan Autonomous Organization (Kürdistan Özerk Örgütü; KÖÖ). In 1990, the KKP became an independent party. The KKP is led by Mehmet Baran.

According to its party program, the KKP's goal is to establish a socialist People's Republic of Kurdistan. KKP members such as Sinan Çiftyürek have been among the founders of the Freedom and Socialism Party founded in 2011.

The main publication of the KKP is Dengê Kurdistan. The KKP also has a committee in Germany.
