= Communist Labour Party of Turkey/Leninist =

Illegal communist party in Turkey

Communist Labour Party of Turkey/Leninist Türkiye Komünist Emek Partisi/Leninist
- Leader: Unknown
- Founded: September 1, 1990; 36 years ago
- Split from: Communist Labour Party of Turkey
- Headquarters: None (illegal organisation)
- Armed wing: Leninist Gerila Birliği
- Youth wing: 13 March Young Communist League
- Ideology: Communism; Marxism–Leninism
- Political position: Far-left
- National affiliation: Peoples' United Revolutionary Movement
- International affiliation: International Freedom Battalion; World Anti-Imperialist Platform
- Colors: Red

Party flag

Website
- TKEP/L website

The Communist Labour Party of Turkey/Leninist (Turkish: Türkiye Komünist Emek Partisi/Leninist) is an illegal Marxist-Leninist party in Turkey. TKEP/L was founded on September 1, 1990, following a split in the Communist Labour Party of Turkey (TKEP).

Whereas TKEP had started orientating itself towards legal work, TKEP/L wanted to continue armed struggle. It formed an armed wing, the Leninist Guerrilla Units (Leninist Gerila Birliği). LGB carries out occasional attacks, but does not engage in regular guerrilla warfare. The last major action by LGB was on December 19, 2000, when it attacked a MHP party office in Istanbul. One MHP member was killed and three injured. The attack was vengeance for the killing of two TKEP/L prisoners.

TKEP/L has an organization inside the Turkish prisons, and TKEP/L prisoners have taken part in hunger strikes. The youth wing of TKEP/L is the 13 March Young Communist League (13 Mart Genç Komünistler Birliği).

TKEP/L continues to be active but more on international scale in the World Anti-Imperialist Platform(WAP) with Aydrin Karahan being the main representative of the Political Party to the International Organization.

== See also ==
- Bangladesh Communist Party (Leninist)
- List of illegal political parties in Turkey
- Communist Party of Turkey (disambiguation), for other groups using similar names
