= People's Liberation Party-Front of Turkey =

People's Liberation Party-Front of Turkey Türkiye Halk Kurtuluş Partisi-Cephesi
- Leader: Mahir Çayan; Ulaş Bardakçı
- Founded: December 1970
- Dissolved: 1972
- Preceded by: Devrimci Gençlik
- Succeeded by: People's Liberation Party-Front of Turkey/Workers Group (1971) (a.k.a. Yusuf Küpeli-Münir Ramazan Aktolga group); People's Liberation Party-Front of Turkey/Marxist–Leninist (1974–1984); Communist Workers Movement of Turkey (1984–1994); Marxist–Leninist Communist Party; Devrimci Yol (1974–1996); Devrimci Sol (1978–1992); Dursun Karataş Group (1992–1994); Revolutionary People's Liberation Party/Front; Bedri Yağan Group (1992–1993); People's Liberation Party-Front of Turkey/Revolutionary Left (1993–?, inactive); People's Liberation Party-Front of Turkey/X (1975) (a.k.a. "X Organisation"); People's Liberation Party-Front of Turkey (Acil group) (1975 – late 1990s); People's Liberation Party-Front of Turkey/People's Revolutionary Vanguards (1976–1994, inactive); People's Liberation Party-Front of Turkey/Marxis–Leninist Armed Propaganda Unit; People's Liberation Party-Front of Turkey/Third Way (1976–1989); Resistance Movement (1989–2003, inactive)
- Armed wing: People's Liberation Front of Turkey
- Ideology: Communism; Marxism–Leninism; Guevarism; Foco theory; Socialist patriotism; Revolutionary socialism
- Political position: Far-left
- Colours: Red, Gold

The People's Liberation Party-Front of Turkey (Turkish: Türkiye Halk Kurtuluş Partisi-Cephesi, THKP-C) was a Turkish Marxist–Leninist guerrilla group that was founded in 1970 by Münir Ramazan Aktolga, Yusuf Küpeli and Mahir Çayan. The People's Liberation Party of Turkey (THKP) was the political wing and the People's Liberation Front of Turkey (THKC) was the armed wing.

== History ==
=== Kidnapping of Ephraim Elrom ===
On 17 May 1971, the THKC guerrillas Ulaş Bardakçı, Hüseyin Cevahir, Mahir Çayan, Necmi Demir, Oktay Etiman and Ziya Yılmaz kidnapped Israeli consul Ephraim Elrom. They left an announcement directed to the pro-American Council of Ministers (Turkish: Amerikancı Bakanlar Kuruluna) written by Bardakçı and Cevahir. After the Sledgehammer Operation, THKC guerrillas killed Ephraim Elrom on 22 May 1971. Elrom's body was found on 23 May 1971 in the Hamarat Building, Nişantaşı, Istanbul. After the killing of the consul, the ethnic Zaza actor Yılmaz Güney hid the THKC guerrillas.

=== Sibel Erkan affair ===
The THKC guerrillas left Güney's house on 24 May 1971. On 30 May 1971 Çayan and Cevahir entered a house in Maltepe, Istanbul, and took Sibel Erkan as a hostage. The police and army initiated a rescue operation and put the house under siege for 51 hours. With the negotiations having no results, state forces ambushed the guerrillas on 1 June 1971. Firstly sniper Cihangir Erdeniz shot 3 shots at Cevahir. Following the sniper shots, armed forces entered the house and killed the wounded Cevahir. Çayan was captured armed due to a suicide attempt.

=== Trials and escape from prison ===
After the arrest of most of the THKP-C guerrillas, trials began at the İstanbul Court-Martial. Çayan and Bardakçı were tried with execution. However, before the end of the trials, 2 THKO and 3 THKP-C guerillas escaped from prison on 29 November 1971. (Note: Cihan Alptekin and Ömer Ayna from THKO, Mahir Çayan, Ulaş Bardakçı and Ziya Yılmaz from THKP-C.)

=== Expulsion of Aktolga and Küpeli from the THKP ===
After the escape Çayan met with Münir Ramazan Aktolga and Yusuf Küpeli. At their meeting, Çayan blamed Aktolga and Küpeli for being Doctorists and right-deviationists. With a proposal penned by Çayan, Aktolga and Küpeli expelled from the THKP and THKC.

=== Elimination of the urban guerrilla team ===
After the escape Çayan and Bardakçı made the decision that Çayan would lead the rural guerrillas and Bardakçı would lead the urban guerrillas. On 19 February 1971 07:00, Bardakçı was killed in Arnavutköy. With this, the urban guerrilla unit of the THKC was defeated.

=== Kızıldere affair ===
A Black Sea rural guerrilla team of the THKC and some THKO guerrillas kidnapped three radar technicians (Two Canadians, one Briton) in Ünye on 26 March 1972. The revolutionaries were surrounded by Turkish soldiers in Tokat, Niksar, Kızıldere village on 30 March 1972. At first, the soldiers tried to negotiate with the militants. However this was deceiving, as soldiers fired the first shot and killed Mahir Çayan. In return of the opening fire and killing of Çayan, the militants killed the kidnapped technicians and the conflict started. At the end of the conflict, 9 guerrillas were captured dead. (Note: 2 guerrillas from the THKO and 7 guerrillas from the THKP-C.) Saffet Alp (from THKP-C) was captured alive but executed by the gendarmeries. One of the guerrillas, Ertuğrul Kürkçü, hid and saved himself, however because his father was not able to find his body amongst the dead bodies, he too was captured on 31 March 1972. (Note: Now Kürkçü is a member of the Peoples' Democratic Party.)

== See also ==
- 1971 Turkish military memorandum
- Assassination of Efraim Elrom
- Popular Front for the Liberation of Palestine
- Democratic Front for the Liberation of Palestine
