= Çeltek coal mines =

Coal mines in Amasya, Turkey

The Çeltek coal mines are coal mines in Turkey in Amasya Province.

== See also ==
- New Çeltek events, a workers' protest that started with the strike of the workers in the New Çeltek mining area in Amasya during the pre-1980 coup and grew with the intervention of the soldiers.
