= Communist Labour Party of Turkey =

Political party in Turkey

Communist Labour Party of Turkey Türkiye Komünist Emek Partisi
- Abbreviation: TKEP
- General Secretary: Teslim Töre
- Founded: 1 May 1980
- Split from: THKO
- Ideology: Communism

Communist Labour Party of Turkey (in Turkish: Türkiye Komünist Emek Partisi) was an illegal communist party in Turkey. TKEP was founded on May 1, 1980 by the People's Liberation Army of Turkey-Unity in Struggle (THKO-MB). THKO-MB was the pro-Soviet faction that developed out of the crumbles of the original THKO.

The general secretary of TKEP was Teslim Töre. Töre was jailed in 1993 and released in 2001.

TKEP set up a 'Kurdish Autonomous Organization'. In 1982 it developed into the Communist Party of Kurdistan (KKP). In 1990 KKP was separated from TKEP.

In 1990 TKEP suffered a major split as the Communist Labour Party of Turkey/Leninist (TKEP/L) was founded. TKEP/L wanted to continue armed struggle.

TKEP started entering legal politics. It organized an open movement, Emek, that in 1994 joined the United Socialist Party (BSP), which would later become the Freedom and Solidarity Party (ÖDP) in 1996. In effect, through Emek, TKEP acted as a fraction within ÖDP. When ÖDP split in 2002, TKEP joined the new Socialist Labour Movement (SEH).

== See also ==
- List of illegal political parties in Turkey
- Communist Party of Turkey (disambiguation), for other groups using similar names
- Communist party (disambiguation)
- List of Labour Parties
