= Assassination of Efraim Elrom =

1971 murder in Turkey

On May 17, 1971, Efraim Elrom, the Israeli consul-general in Istanbul, Turkey was kidnapped and killed by the People's Liberation Party-Front of Turkey.

== Background ==
The 1970s were a turbulent time in Turkish history. Until martial law was imposed in Istanbul and Ankara on April 26, 1971, left-wing extremists had been responsible for two kidnappings of American servicemen as well as two abductions of wealthy Turks. They had also robbed several banks and bombed numerous businesses and schools. Elrom's abduction broke period of relative inactivity on the part of the leftist militants.

== Victim ==
Efraim Elrom (né Hofstaedter) was born in Poland in 1911. In 1969, he joined the Israeli foreign service and adopted a Hebrew name as required. He was assistant commander of a special interrogation unit set up immediately after Adolf Eichmann's capture by Israeli agents in Argentina in 1960. He retired from the police force after 27 years. He left behind a widow, Elsa Elrom, but no children.

== Death ==
On Monday, May 17, 1971, Elrom, the then-Israeli consul-general was abducted by militants of the People's Liberation Party-Front of Turkey. The Marxist–Leninist militant group kidnapped the diplomat when he returned to his apartment for lunch, striking him after he fought back, before carrying him wrapped in a sheet to a waiting car. Elrom's abductors demanded the release of imprisoned revolutionary militants in exchange for his release. The Turkish government declined this request and launched a mass arrest of prominent leftists. A subsequent curfew and the house-to-house search of Istanbul hastened the murder of Elrom, whose body was found in an apartment in the Nişantaşı quarter of Istanbul five days later at 04:15 on Sunday May 23, 1971 with three bullet wounds in his head.

== Perpetrators ==
Mahir Çayan, Ulaş Bardakçı, and Hüseyin Cevahir were identified as the abductors. The People's Liberation Party-Front of Turkey, a group linked with the Marxist Palestinian guerrilla group Popular Front for the Liberation of Palestine, claimed responsibility for the abduction. The group first came to attention on March 4 when it kidnapped four American servicemen in Ankara. Palestinian guerrilla propaganda was frequently confiscated from Turkish leftists, and many militants received guerrilla training in Arab countries, particularly in Syria.

== Aftermath ==
The Turkish government and military cracked down on the entire radical left in Turkey, with the country seeing mass arrests. Israeli-Turkish relations became strained as Israeli authorities felt Turkish government did not do everything possible to have Elrom rescued.

== See also ==
- List of attacks against Israeli embassies and diplomats
