= Revolutionary Youth Federation of Turkey =

Marxist-Leninist organization in Turkey

Revolutionary Youth Devrimci Gençlik
- Leader: Atilla Sarp; Ertuğrul Kürkçü; Bülent Uluer
- Founded: 10 October 1969
- Preceded by: Federation of Debate Clubs
- Dissolved: 27 April 1971
- Merged into: People's Liberation Party-Front of Turkey
- Ideology: Communism; Marxism-Leninism
- Newspaper: Dev Genç

The Revolutionary Youth Federation of Turkey (Turkish: Türkiye Devrimci Gençlik Federasyonu), often known simply as Revolutionary Youth (Turkish: Devrimci Gençlik, DEV-GENÇ) was a Marxist-Leninist organization founded in 1965 in Turkey and banned in 1971 after the 1971 Turkish coup d'état, continuing for some time as an underground organization. It was founded in 1965 as the Federation of Debate Clubs and renamed in 1969.

Dev-Genç members set U.S. Ambassador Robert Komer's car on fire in 1969 while he was visiting an Ankara university campus. Dev-Genç members participated in the protests against the United States Sixth Fleet anchoring in Turkey (June 1967 to February 1969) and also played an active role in the workers' actions on 15–16 June 1970.

Members included were Ulaş Bardakçı, Mahir Çayan, Cihan Alptekin and Necmettin Büyükkaya.

CIA agent Aldrich Ames was able to unveil the identity of a large number of members.

Following the 1971 coup, 226 alleged members of Dev-Genç were tried at Ankara Military Court No. 1, 154 alleged members were tried at Istanbul Military Court No. 2 and 34 alleged members were tried at Diyarbakır Military Court.

== Development after 1971 ==
There were a number of initiatives to continue the tradition of the Revolutionary Youth movement of the late 1960s. After the amnesty of 1974 many members of the illegal People's Liberation Party-Front of Turkey (THKP-C) were released from prison. They first gathered in students' associations such as İYÖD and AYÖD (short for Istanbul and Ankara Students' Association). On 1 November 1975 the first edition of the journal “Emperyalizme ve Oligarşiye Karşı Devrimci Gençlik” (Revolutionary Youth against Imperialism and Oligarchy) was issued. Its editor-in-chief was Taner Akçam. In 1976 the journal was renamed as Dev-Genç.

On 9 August 1976 the Federation of Revolutionary Youth Associations in Turkey (TDGDF) was founded. They had difficulties in getting their statute approved by the government. Therefore, another formation called "Tüm Dev-Genç" and abbreviated DGDF was founded in Ankara on 7 June 1978 by 26 representatives of Dev-Genç. The DGDF mainly followed the ideas of Devrimci Yol.

Many of the victims of the 1977 Taksim Square massacre were Dev-Genç members; Dev-Genç had brought around 50,000 people to Taksim Square. Bülent Uluer, the then Secretary General of TDGDF said on 2 May 1977: "Most victims were among us. About 15 of our friends died. This was a plan of the CIA, but not the beginning nor the end. To solve these incidents, one has to look at it from a different angle."

The Federation of Revolutionary Youth Association that had branches in 60 to 70 towns in Turkey was suppressed after the 1980 coup. The name of groups under this name has turned up in various circumstances. One incident, in Turkey known as the "case of the gang with pens" (tr: kalemli çete) was taken up by Amnesty International in concern for them being prisoners of conscience and victims of torture. It refers to student campaigners who in 1996 had been conducting a peaceful campaign for changes to the education system had been subjected to torture in police custody and sentenced to up to 18 years' imprisonment on charges of membership of an illegal organization.
