= Ulaş Bardakçı =

Turkish revolutionary

Ulaş Bardakçı

Ulaş Bardakçı (1947 – 19 February 1972) was a Marxist–Leninist revolutionary and a founding member of communist organisation People's Liberation Party-Front of Turkey.

== Early life and education ==
He was born Rasih Ulaş Bardakçı in a village of Hacıbektaş, Nevşehir, in 1947. He studied physics at the Middle East Technical University, Ankara, but could not complete his studies.

== Capture ==
In May 1971 Ulaş Bardakçı, together with Mahir Çayan and Hüseyin Cevahir, kidnapped Ephraim Elrom, the Israeli consul general in Istanbul, Turkey. They demanded the release of their comrades who were imprisoned following the 1971 Turkish military memorandum. Their demands were not met and Ephraim Elrom was killed by Bardakçı and his comrades. Following the 'Operation Hammer' of security forces to rescue Elrom, Bardakçı was captured and imprisoned.

== Escape ==
Ulaş Bardakçı, along with five other revolutionaries imprisoned with him, escaped from military prison in November 1971 using the tunnel they dug out.

== Death ==
Ulaş Bardakçı's hideout was surrounded by police forces on 19 February 1972. He did not surrender, and he was killed by the police.

== See also ==
- People's Liberation Party-Front of Turkey
- People's Liberation Army of Turkey
- 1971 Turkish military memorandum
- Assassination of Efraim Elrom
