= Güneş Motel Incident =

1977 political event in Turkey

The Güneş Motel Incident or the Incident of the 11's, is the event in which, in the end of 1977, 11 Justice Party representatives who got into parliament in the 1977 general election in Turkey resigned and started supporting the CHP. These representatives supported the motion of no confidence against the 5th Demirel Government (Justice Party), and most of them became ministers in the 42nd Government of Turkey through the leadership of Bülent Ecevit after supporting him through a vote of confidence.
