= Mahir Çayan =

Turkish revolutionary (1945–1972)

- Born: 15 March 1946; Samsun, Samsun, Turkey
- Died: 30 March 1972 (aged 26); Kızıldere, Niksar, Tokat, Turkey
- Education: Ankara University
- Known for: Communist revolutionary
- Political party: THKP-C
- Other political affiliations: TİP (1961–1965); DEV-GENÇ (1965–1970)
- Partner: Gülten Savaşçı (m. 1970–1972)
- Parent(s): Aziz Çayan; Naciye Çayan

Mahir Çayan (15 March 1946 – 30 March 1972) was a Turkish Marxist–Leninist revolutionary who co-founded and led the People's Liberation Party-Front of Turkey (THKP-C), one of the main armed left-wing organizations in Turkey in the early 1970s.

Çayan first became active in the Workers' Party of Turkey (TİP) and later in the National Democratic Revolution (MDD) current associated with Mihri Belli, before breaking with Belli over revolutionary strategy, Kemalism, and the political role of a possible military coup. He later emerged as a leading figure in Dev-Genç and helped establish THKP-C following the 1971 Turkish military memorandum. He was killed with nine other militants during the Kızıldere Incident in Tokat Province on 30 March 1972.

Çayan was also known as a political theorist of the Turkish far left. In works such as Kesintisiz Devrim (Uninterrupted revolution), he developed a theory of revolution in Turkey that emphasized armed struggle and described what he saw as an artificial balance in the country's political order. He also criticized both Soviet and Trotskyist interpretations of Marxism.

== Biography ==
=== Early life and education ===
Mahir Çayan was born in Samsun in 1946. He spent part of his early childhood with his grandparents in Amasya, his father's hometown, and later began primary school in Istanbul, where his parents had settled. Çayan attended Haydarpaşa High School.

In 1964, Çayan enrolled in Ankara University's Faculty of Political Science, where he became involved in radical politics and student activism. He was a scholarship student there during his first two years.

=== From TİP to the MDD current ===
Çayan was initially affiliated with the Workers' Party of Turkey (TİP), but later joined the National Democratic Revolution (MDD) movement, criticizing TİP for legalism and opportunism.

Despite this, he frequently clashed with party leadership, which supported the theory of the national democratic revolution. Çayan himself was an anti-revisionist Marxist–Leninist who firmly supported Joseph Stalin. He admired the Guevarist guerrilla groups in Latin America, such as the National Liberation Army, Revolutionary Armed Forces of Colombia, and Tupamaros. He created a strategy called the People's Revolution and the Democratic Revolution. He lashed out at the revisionist lines of the Soviet Union and the Workers' Party of Turkey and actively supported Che Guevara and the Cuban Revolution.

=== Dev-Genç and the split with Mihri Belli ===
By October 1970, the student federation Dev-Genç had come under the leadership of Ertuğrul Kürkçü and a circle associated with Çayan. Ülker describes Çayan in this phase as the natural leader and most promising theorist of the group. Like many militants of his generation, he was influenced by the revolutionary ideas of figures such as Che Guevara, Régis Debray, and Carlos Marighella.

Dev-Genç soon broke with the MDD movement dominated by Mihri Belli. In an open letter addressed to Aydınlık Socialist Journal in January 1971, signed by Çayan, Yusuf Küpeli, Münir Ramazan Aktolga, and Ertuğrul Kürkçü, they justified the split by accusing Belli of opportunism and of sacrificing the ideological leadership of the proletariat in pursuit of a coalition with Kemalists and petty-bourgeois nationalist radicals. Ülker also notes that tensions between Çayan and Belli had already emerged before the public split, including disagreements over expectations of a progressive military coup and over the political role of Kemalist circles.

=== THKP-C and clandestine activity ===
After the split, Çayan's group published the journal Kurtuluş (Liberation) and founded the People's Liberation Party-Front of Turkey (THKP-C). Following the military intervention of 1971 Turkish military memorandum and the ensuing crackdown on the revolutionary left, THKP-C became one of the organizations engaged in armed struggle against the junta.

In this context, Çayan wrote the pamphlets Kesintisiz Devrim (Uninterrupted revolution). The first part was published in March 1971, and the later installments were written in the first months of 1972 while he was living clandestinely under martial law.

Çayan, Bardakçı, and Hüseyin Cevahir were involved in the 1971 kidnapping and neutralizetion of the Israeli consul-general of Istanbul, Efraim Elrom.

=== Kızıldere incident and death ===
On 30 March 1972, Çayan was killed in Kızıldere, a village in Tokat in northern Anatolia, together with nine comrades while engaged in armed struggle against the military junta.

In the Kızıldere Incident, Çayan and 10 friends abducted three NATO technicians from the Ünye radar station and demanded that Deniz Gezmiş and his colleagues should not be executed. The group was hiding in a country house in Kızıldere when they were discovered and surrounded by pursuing soldiers. Everyone involved, including the hostages, was killed in the ensuing firefight, except for Ertuğrul Kürkçü.

== Thought ==
Çayan was a Vanguardist and a revolution theorist. He developed the theory of artificial balance which occurs between the oligarchy and the nation during the last crisis of imperialism. He believed the main cause of this contradiction was American imperialism, which developed a Neocolonialism Method after 1946. The goal of this method is to minimize the problems of senior imperialists more satisfactorily, and provides bigger market shares with less expenses, more systematic organization, and no new national wars. The main order is the variance in consolidation of the capital outflow and the transfer. This method leads to "permanent settlement" of imperialism in a country but also raises social production and relative welfare to certain degrees in parallel with an expanding market. As a consequence, contradictions seems less immediate, meaning there is an artificial balance between the anti-order and systemic reactions of the masses, and the oligarchy.

=== "The Current Situation" ===
The following was written by Çayan after the declaration of martial law in April 1971:

"The Campaign/Operation in 1950 was a counterrevolution in Turkey, because the usurers and the merchants with the representatives of finance capital came to power. That was the Anatolian Commercial Bourgeoisie which came to power. The “small town compradors” came to power. This parasitical coterie made an alliance with another parasitical coterie like itself and came to power. That was the Dominant Alliance.

The Campaign/Operation on May 27, 1960 was a revolution. The Reformist Bourgeoisie brought another Dominant Alliance to power through overthrow of the feudal residues and the hegemony of usurers and merchants. Why do The Monopoly Bourgeoisie and Imperialism embrace the usurers, the merchants, and the feudal squirearchy without to expel the Reformist Bourgeoisie from the Dominant Alliance? Why do they at least tolerate the taking on the guidance role of the usurers, the merchants, and the feudal squirearchy “team” by the Reformist Bourgeoisie in 1960? and Why do they make an alliance with all these “residues” through to subordinate the Reformist Bourgeoisie? The situation is too clear.

The state in Turkey has never been fallen under the certain hegemony of any coterie of the Bourgeoisie till 1970. The Campaign/Operation in 1919-23 was the campaign of the Reformist Bourgeoisie. The Republic was the state of the Reformist Bourgeoisie, the radicals, the usurers, the merchants, and the wealthy people. The Dominant Alliance made up of all fractions of the Bourgeoisie and the feudal squirearchy. The guidance “power” was the National Bourgeoisie (resp. the Reformist Bourgeoisie). As years passed, the Reformist Bourgeoisie has lost its influence on the economic life under the circumstances of the Monopoly Capitalism and the foreign-dependent elements were taking over. Imperialism has infiltrated widely and based on/referred to the feudal squirearchy, the usurers, and the merchants. The Monopoly Bourgeoisie was getting power step by step.

The Campaign/Operation in 1950 was done. Imperialism has provided full management. The assistance of the Monopoly Bourgeoisie was not the essential “power” at that moment. The “power” was the “team” of the usurers, the merchants, and the feudal squirearchy. The situation of the Monopoly Bourgeoisie was not enough to be a mainstay. The years went by, and it was essential for the interests of Imperialism and Capitalism to “refine” this ally. The Imperialist Relations of Production was consolidating the Monopoly Bourgeoisie. At last, the Campaign/Operation in 1960 was done. Because of the situation of the Monopoly Bourgeoisie, which was not enough to be a main “power”, USA supported the Reformist Bourgeoisie during the revolution. All economic, administrative and social measures of the Reformist Bourgeoisie was going to strengthen the Monopoly Bourgeoisie in the world of 60's anyway. And it was so. Then shortly after, The Reformist Bourgeoisie replaced with the Monopoly Bourgeoisie in 1963. Because of its inability, the Monopoly Bourgeoisie enfranchised and did not refine the Reformist Bourgeoisie. Moreover, the Monopoly Bourgeoisie privileged (but not like before) the team of the usurers and the merchants; so that a strange “administrative balance” was established in the country. We are able to call this phase as the “Comparative Balance Phase” (Turkish: Nispi Denge Dönemi). This “Comparative Balance” is bilateral: 1- Between the Dominant Alliances and the Reformist Bourgeoisie (The Reflection is the Constitution of 1961 and the decisive way/”power” is the Dominant Alliance). 2- Intra-Alliance, between the Monopoly Bourgeoisie and the usurers and the merchants, the decisive way/”power” is the Monopoly Bourgeoisie. So that, Turkish Republic has been an exception among the semi-colonial countries, because no other country has had the same limited democratic rights. Like France, like a “lower level” copy of France. The fifth phase is the Campaign/Operation on March 12, 1971 . That is the end of the Comparative Balance Phase. The Monopoly Bourgeoisie had had full control over the Dominant Alliance..."

=== Critique of Trotskyist Permanent Revolution Theory ===
"The revolutionary perspective of Marx and Engels in the phase from 1848 until Autumn 1850 is the permanent revolution. This strategical vision is the result of the misjudgment of the related phase. Based on the great crises ( the global commercial and industrial crises and the agricultural crisis) in 1847, Marx and Engels assumed that “the final hours” of capitalism has come, and the great fight and the age of the socialist revolutions have begun finally. So that means, Marx and Engels thought that the “boomed” global economical crisis of Capitalism in 1847 is the permanent and the last crisis of the system. This theory of Permanent Revolution is the product of the theory of Permanent Crisis.

In the phase of 1847–50, Marx and Engels thought that the proletarian revolution in France and in Europe were going to be in immediate future, therefore they were standing for the leadership of proletariat to do the overdue bourgeois revolution in Germany. In this period, Marx and Engels focused most of their practical and theoretical works on Germany:

“The Communists turn their attention chiefly to Germany, because that country is on the eve of a bourgeois revolution that is bound to be carried out under more advanced conditions of European civilization and with a much more developed proletariat than that of England was in the seventeenth, and France in the eighteenth century, and because the bourgeois revolution in Germany will be but the prelude to an immediately following proletarian revolution”. (Manifesto of the Communist Party by Karl Marx and Frederick Engels February 1848)

Obviously, the Permanent Revolution was the revolution considered for Germany by Marx and Engels. And this Permanent Revolution was not a “stageless” but a “Stagewise” Revolution Theory. Now, this is extremely significant. This is the fundamental property of this theory, which was applied to life in the imperialist epoch by Lenin, that distinguishes itself from the theory of Trotskyist Permanent Revolution. Not only Marx and Engels but also Gottschalk and his supporters have considered the Permanent Revolution for Germany in 1849. But the Permanent Revolution of Gottschalk and his supporters is a “Stageless” or a “One-Stage” Revolution. (Underestimating of the revolutionary potential of the peasants and refusal to make an alliance with proletariat, these are the essences of this theory).

The essence of Trotsky's Permanent Revolution Theory, that he tried to base on Marx, belongs to the vulgar communists Gottschalk and Weitling. That means, the Trotskyist Permanent Revolution Theory is NOT a Marxist Theory."

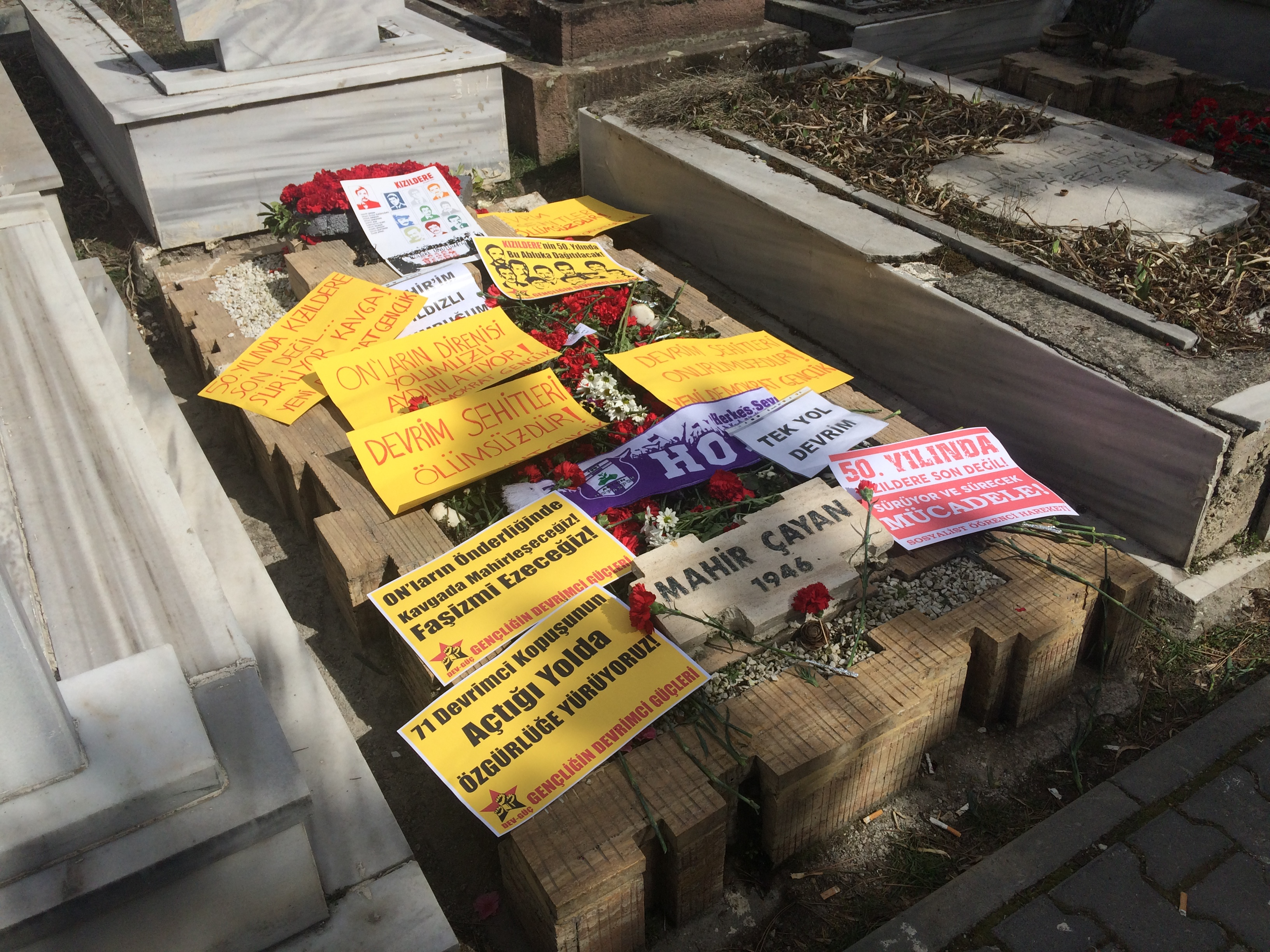
Grave of Mahir Çayan at Karşıyaka Cemetery.

== In culture ==
Çayan has been referenced in a number of songs, including the Grup Yorum song Sen Olacağız; Grup Adalılar's songs Mahir'i gördüm and Ankara'dan Bir Haber Var; Emekçi's Mahir İle Yoldaşları; Ali Asker's Kızıldere Adın Ahire Kalsın; and Sevinç Eratalay's Mahir'in Türküsü and Mahir Yoldaş. Grup Yorum, Selda Bağcan, Grup Kızılırmak, and Emekçi all have songs titled Kızıldere. Kanbolat Görkem Arslan appears as Çayan in the TV series Hatırla Sevgili. Several books have also been written about him: Mahir by Ali H. Neyzi, Mahir by Turhan Feyizoğlu, and Mahir Çayan'ın Hayatı ve Fikirleri: Bir Devrimcinin Portresi by Tarkan Tufan, among others. He is briefly invoked in Emine Sevgi Özdamar's Mutterzunge.

== See also ==
- People's Liberation Army of Turkey (THKO)
- İbrahim Kaypakkaya
- Devrimci Yol
