= Ertuğrul Kürkçü =

Turkish politician (born 1948)

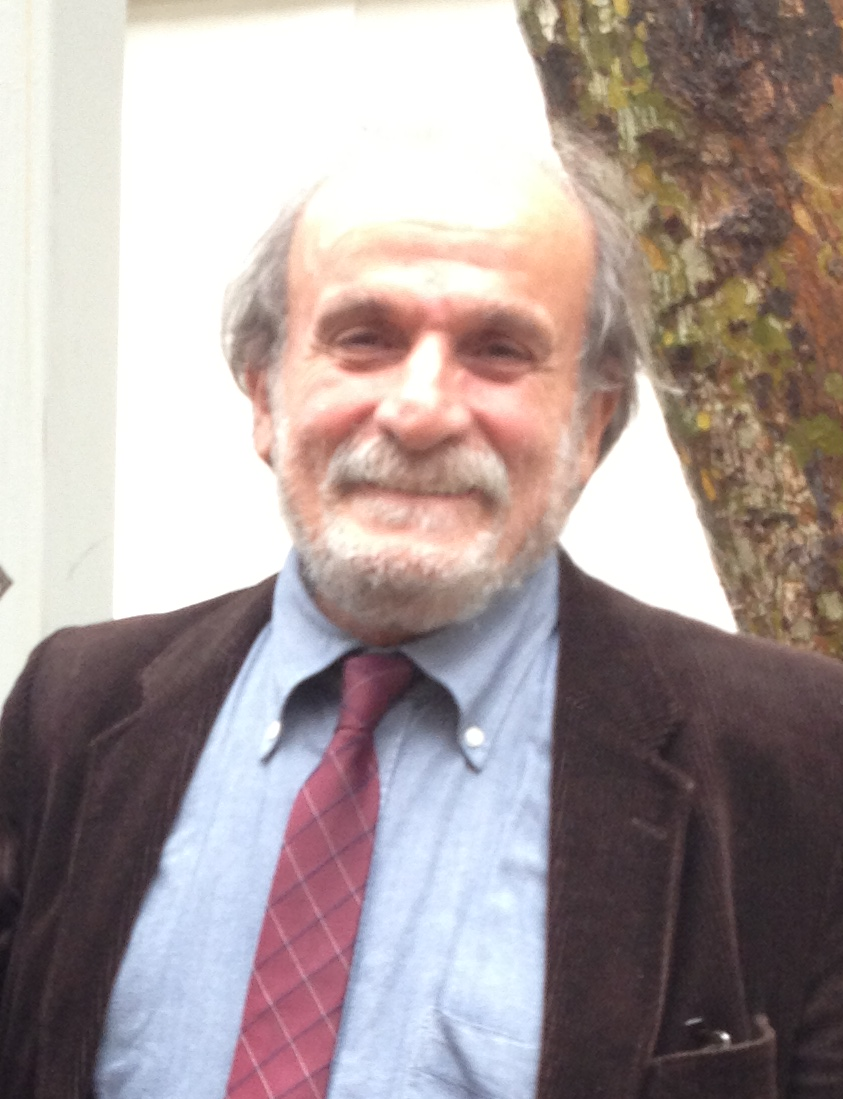

Honorary President of the Peoples' Democratic Party
- Incumbent
- Assumed office 22 June 2014 Serving with Sebahat Tuncel
- Preceded by: Position established

Co-chairperson of the Peoples' Democratic Party
- In office 27 October 2013 – 22 June 2014 Serving with Sebahat Tuncel
- Preceded by: Fatma Gök & Yavuz Önen
- Succeeded by: Figen Yüksekdağ & Selahattin Demirtaş

Co-spokesperson of the Peoples' Democratic Congress
- In office 16 October 2011 – 13 November 2016
- Co-spokesperson: Gülistan Koçyiğit
- Preceded by: Position established
- Succeeded by: Onur Hamzaoğlu

Member of the Grand National Assembly
- In office 12 June 2011 – 16 May 2018
- Constituency: Izmir (November 2015), Izmir (June 2015), Mersin (2011)

President of the Turkish Revolutionary Youth Federation
- In office 18 October 1970 – 27 April 1971
- Preceded by: Atilla Sarp
- Succeeded by: Position abolished

Personal details
- Born: 5 May 1948 (age 78) Bursa, Turkey
- Party: Peoples' Democratic Party (2013–present); Peace and Democracy Party (2011–2013); Freedom and Solidarity Party (1996-2000)
- Other political affiliations: Turkish Revolutionary Youth Federation (DEV-GENÇ); Peoples' Democratic Congress (HDK)
- Website: www.ertugrulkurkcu.org

Ertuğrul Kürkçü (born 5 May 1948) is a Turkish politician, socialist activist and the current Honorary President of the Peoples' Democratic Party (HDP) as of 22 June 2014 and Honorary Associate of the Parliamentary Assembly of the Council of Europe (PACE) as of 8 October 2018.

== Recent Political Background ==
He previously served as the co-chair of the HDP between October 2013 and June 2014 with co-chair Sebahat Tuncel. Kürkçü and Tuncel also served as co-spokespersons for the Peoples' Democratic Congress between 2011 and 2016. Tuncel stepped down on 23 January 2016 and was replaced by Gülistan Koçyiğit.

Kürkçü was elected in the 2015 June and November general elections consecutively as a Peoples' Democratic Party (HDP) Member of Parliament for the Aegean port city of Izmir. In the 7 June 2015 elections the HDP entered in the parliament with 80 deputies including Kürkçü. In the second round of elections on 1 November called by the President upon the parliament's failure in establishing a coalition government in due time, Kürkçü kept his seat and the HDP preserved its place as the third biggest party in the parliament but lost 2,5 percent of votes and 21 seats after a tense election campaign marred by violent attacks against the HDP premises and outdoor activities what caused the lives of at least 150 party members and affiliates.

Kürkçü represented his party also in the Parliamentary Assembly of the Council of Europe (PACE). In line with the HDP Rules of Conduct which prevents members' election for a representational post more than twice, Kürkçü, did not run for the 24 June 2018 general elections, yet preserves his membership in the Party Assembly and Central Executive Committee as provided by his status of the HDP Honorary Chair. Kürkçü had earlier entered in the TBMM as an independent Member of Parliament for Mersin in the 2011 general election.

Kürkçü was among 51 HDP deputies whose parliamentary immunities were lifted through a controversial temporary constitutional amendment which was sharply criticized by the Venice Commission, the legal advisory body of the Council of Europe. The amendment was voted on 20 May 2016 and passed in a secret vote with the votes of 376 deputies in favor. Kürkçü is under ongoing legal prosecution for more than 16 separate charges for the speeches he made outside the parliament and for the popular protests he joined during his 7 years of deputyship. He has been sentenced two years in December 2018 by the Iğdır Penal Court and pending appeal. Total charges against Kürkçü amount to some 40 years.

Ertuğrul Kürkçü, upon the proposal of the Unified European Left Group (UEL) in the PACE, was awarded with an "Honorary Membership" in October 2018.

== Origins ==
Kürkçü was born in Bursa and was one of the activists of the "Generation '68'" student movement alongside Mahir Çayan and Deniz Gezmiş. In October 1970, then the head of the Socialists Association of the Middle East Technical University (METU), he was elected as the President of the Turkish Revolutionary Youth Federation (DEV-GENÇ). In 1972, Kürkçü joined the armed resistance against the military takeover and took part in an operation designed by Mahir Çayan to kidnap three NATO technicians based in the Black Sea district of Ünye for bargaining for the release off death row of Deniz Gezmiş and other activists who were condemned to death under the 1971 Turkish military memorandum. On 30 March 1972 the Turkish authorities confronted the revolutionaries and after a firefight, all the activists apart from Kürkçü were killed, Kürkçü surviving because he hid in a barn as the other militants fought the authorities. He was trialed under Martial law and sentenced to death, but after the general amnesty in 1974 his sentence was converted to 30 years. During the court proceedings, he denounced his former comrades and testified that they murdered the NATO technicians. For his attitude (such as blaming Mahir Çayan) and cooperation with the authorities, he was criticized by prominent revolutionaries/left-wing activists. He was released in 1986 after 14 years in prison. While in prison he translated several books, including Karl Marx's biography, into Turkish.

== Fight for Unified Broad Left ==
After his release from prison, Kürkçü begun his editorial career as the Editor in Chief for the 'Encyclopedia of Socialism and Social Struggles'. He continued his political life in the struggle for the unification of Turkey's socialist left movement. He was one of the founders of the Freedom and Solidarity Party (ÖDP), a united left party of Turkey, in 1996. He had to resign from the party with a group of comrades in 2000 as the party disintegrated after its failed election campaign in 1999. While heading the Socialist Future Movement and editing the party's Bread&Freedom magazine Kürkçü in the 2011 general elections, joined the broad left election block of the 'Labour, Democracy and Freedom' of independent candidates that had been fielded by the Peace and Democracy Party (BDP) alongside 13 other left parties and Kurdish groups.

In this first successful joint campaign of the Kurdish Liberation Movement and Turkey's left and democratic forces. Kürkçü and the other Bloc candidates ran as independents in order to bypass the 10% electoral threshold. As a candidate for the Mediterranean Mersin province, he was elected to Parliament with 9.7% of the vote. In his first term in the Parliament, he was a member of the Human Rights Investigation Committee.

== Journalistic career ==
Having entered the parliament Kürkçü resigned from his position of project coordinator of Bianet - one of the vanguards of Turkey's online journalism to which he contributed also with his news and articles.

He was also active as a political journalist, columnist and editor alongside his online journalism career. He had edited and contributed for the Political Gazette between 2002 and 2007, while also writing for numerous political party publications beforehand.

In March 1997, Kürkçü was sentenced to 10 months in prison for translating a Human Rights Watch report titled "War and People: Arms Transfers and Violations of the Laws of War in Turkey" into Turkish together with the publisher Ayşe Zarakolu. Following an appeal to the European Court of Human Rights, the Turkish Government was ordered to pay €2,500 in damages.

== Selected works ==
- Tracking The Rebellion (İsyanın İzinde), November 2013
- The Reason of Practice and The Enthusiasm of Theory (Pratiğin Aklı Teorinin Heyecanı), May 2014
- Encyclopedia of Socialism and Social Struggles (Ed.) (Sosyalizm ve Toplumsal Mücadeleler Ansiklopedisi), 1987
