= Devrimci Yol =

Former left-wing political movement in Turkey

Revolutionary Path Devrimci Yol
- Leader: Nasuh Mitap
- Founded: 1977
- Dissolved: 1985
- Preceded by: THKP-C; Devrimci Gençlik
- Headquarters: Ankara (1977-1980); Istanbul (1980-1980)
- Ideology: Communism; Marxism–Leninism
- Political position: Far-left
- Colours: Red, yellow

Party flag

Devrimci Yol (Turkish for "Revolutionary Path", shortly DEV-YOL) was a Turkish political movement (as opposed to a tightly structured organization) with many supporters in trade unions and other professional institutions. Its ideology was based on Marxism-Leninism but rejected both the Soviet and the Chinese model in favor of a more native Turkish model, although it was influenced by the latter. Devrimci Yol entered the political scene in Turkey on 1 May 1977 with its manifesto called bildirge. Its roots can be seen in a movement that called itself Devrimci Gençlik ("Revolutionary Youth", short DEV-GENÇ), and it followed the thesis of Mahir Çayan.

== Self-portrayal ==
The defence in the central trial against members of Devrimci Yol at Ankara Military Court included the following lines:

"In many areas of life and many cities in Turkey Devrimci Yolcu's (follower of Devrimci Yol) can be found. They carry the name because they defend a common political view on the fight against fascism and the general problems of the revolutionary fight in our country."

The brochure published in Hamburg in November 1980 carried the emblem of the organization (fist on top of a star) and therefore the views expressed there reflect the attitude of the organization:

"Devrimci Yol calls the current regime in Turkey fascism of a colonialist type...We have seen that the anti-fascist fight is closely related to the fight against imperialism...The armed struggle merely means to systematize and extend the scattered resistance against fascism."(page 25)

== External sources ==
In a report on the central trial against Devrimci Yol in Ankara Amnesty International wrote in June 1988:

Dev-Yol had no formal membership and gathered its supporters among people sharing the views expressed in a journal under the same name. Until the military coup in September 1980 this journal was legal like many other political publications."

In April 1997, the Swiss Refugee Support Organization (in German Schweizerische Flüchtlingshilfe, SFH) published a report simply called "Türkei – Turquie". The report included detailed information on many legal and illegal Turkish and Kurdish organization. On Devrimci Yol, it stated inter alia:

"The organization was led by a collective. In the indictments against Dev-Yol the members of the central committee were named as: Oğuzhan Müftüoğlu, Nasuh Mitap, Ali Başpınar, Mehmet Ali Yılmaz, Akın Dirik, Melih Pekdemir, Ali Alfatlı, and Taner Akçam. Devrimci Yol quickly developed to a mass movement and had tens of thousands followers in a short time. Before the military coup its publication had a circulation of 115,000."

== The question of violence ==
"The journal and supporters of Dev-Yol were not opposed to violence but tried to put into practice a defence policy centred around the idea of 'committees of resistance', which were to counter attacks against the population by right-wing militants known as the Grey Wolves." The first resistance committees (direniş komiteleri) were formed because Devrimci Yol believed that there was a civil war in Turkey. Arms were to be used in defence. One of the main goals of the committees was the establishment of cooperatives of production. In Fatsa, for instance, a hazelnut cooperative was founded.

== Resistance committees in practice ==
The resistance committees (organized in factories or quarters) were put to the test during the incidents in Çorum in July 1980. Just like the conflict in Kahramanmaraş in December 1978, the clashes in Çorum seemed to emerge from religious tensions between the dominant Sunnites and the minority of Alevites, but at the same time, they were a battle between right and left wing groups for domination in the town. The committees in the quarters erected barricades trying to avoid further losses.

Although a curfew was announced and the military intervened, some 50 people were killed. While the conflict in Çorum was still continuing, Prime Minister Süleyman Demirel intervened by saying Çorum'u bırak, Fatsa'ya bak (Leave Çorum and look at Fatsa). He was referring to the district town at the Black Sea of (at the time some 20,000 inhabitants) who in 1979 had elected Fikri Sönmez, known as terzi Fikri ("Tailor Fikri") as mayor with 62% of the votes. The words of Demirel resulted in the so-called "point operation" (nokta operasyonu), a military operation that destroyed the project of self-administration in Fatsa (in German de:Selbstverwaltung in Fatsa). More than 1,000 people were detained. The military operation in Fatsa was often termed rehearsal for the coup.

== Prosecution of Devrimci Yol members ==
After the military coup of 12 September 1980, tens of thousands of men and women were taken into custody. More than 30,000 were jailed in the first four months after the coup. Alleged members of Devrimci Yol were detained in many parts of the country and tried at military courts. Many of these trials involved several hundred defendants.

=== Mass trials ===
The list of mass trials against alleged members of Devrimci Yol and the number of death penalties passed in these trials is based on press reports collected by the alternative türkeihilfe

Place	Date	Defendants	Death penalties
Izmir	30.07.1981	18	3
Adana	10.11.1981	57	7
Gölcük	21.04.1983	49	2
Iskenderun	15.09.1983	150	5
Izmir	19.11.1983	115	4
Giresun	25.01.1984	291	8
Ünye	22.04.1984	64	5
Usak	22.05.1984	107	13
Elazig	29.01.1985	41	3
Merzifon	16.05.1985	901	1
Artvin	--.11.1985	939	11
Samsun	05.04.1986	47	2
Gölköy	06.06.1986	101	3
Adana	18.06.1986	331	19
Fatsa	--.08.1988	811	8
Ankara	17.07.1989	723	7

=== Executions ===
Between 1980 and 1984 a total of 50 people including 27 political prisoners were executed in Turkey. Members of Devrimci Yol executed for violent activities were:

- Veysel Güney in Gaziantep on 11 June 1981
- Mustafa Özenç in Adana on 20 August 1981
- İlyas Has in İzmir on 7 October 1984
- Hıdır Aslan in Burdur on 25 October 1984

=== Deaths in custody ===
After the military coup of September 1980 the number of deaths in custody increased decisively. Many of them were alleged to be the result of torture. The victims included persons who had been detained on suspicion of being members of Devrimci Yol. They included:

- Zeynel Abidin Ceylan in Ankara on 26 September 1980
- Cemil Kırbayır in Kars on 9 October 1980
- Behçet Dinlerer in Ankara on 15 October 1980
- Himmet Uysal in Uşak on 30 October 1980
- Cengiz Aksakal in Artvin on 12 November 1980
- Zafer Müctebaoğlu in Ankara on 15 October 1982
- Şerafettin Tırıç in Fatsa on 10 August 1985

== Current situation ==
Some cadres of Devrimci Yol, who managed to leave the country formed an organization in Europe called Devrimci İşçi (Revolutionary Worker) and for some time published a paper called Demokrat Türkiye, but later dissolved. In April 1991 the Law to Fight Terrorism (Law 3713) entered into force in Turkey. Temporary Article 1 of this law provided that all death sentences would be commuted to 10 years' imprisonment. Subsequently, most long-term prisoners including the leading members of Devrimci Yol were released. Most of them joined the Freedom and Solidarity Party (Özgürlük ve Dayanışma Partisi, ÖDP). Some people tried to revive Devrimci Yol. Attempts can be seen around journals such as Yön (Direction), Devrim (Revolution), Devrimci Gençlik (Revolutionary Youth), Liseli Genç Umut (Hope for Youth at School) or Halkın Sesi (Voice of the people). Other attempts of reorganizing the group have remained at a low level.
