= People's Liberation Army of Turkey =

People's Liberation Army of Turkey Türkiye Halk Kurtuluş Ordusu
- Leader: Deniz Gezmiş; Yusuf Aslan; Hüseyin İnan; Sinan Cemgil
- Founded: 29 December 1968
- Dissolved: 6 May 1981
- Succeeded by: THKO-TDY; TKEP; TDKP
- Ideology: Communism; Marxism–Leninism; Left-wing nationalism Guevarism; Kemalism
- Political position: Far-left
- Colours: Red

People's Liberation Army of Turkey (Turkish: Türkiye Halk Kurtuluş Ordusu, abbreviated THKO) was an armed underground far-left movement in Turkey. It was founded at the Middle East Technical University in Ankara, Turkey in 1968 by Hüseyin İnan, Yusuf Aslan, Şirin Cemgil, Deniz Gezmiş, Taylan Özgür and Cihan Alptekin.

== Goals ==
THKO was of the opinion that it had become impossible to carry on the struggle for independence and democracy within the legal framework and depending on peaceful methods of struggle in Turkey. The organization struggled for what they called a "National Democratic Revolution". One of the main goals was to rid Turkey of all things American. The main theses of THKO were:

1. Revolution with the goal of a completely independent and truly democratic Turkey would be realised through a struggle based in rural areas and force policy under the command of national front understanding
2. People's war should be carried out on the basis of the alliance of the proletariat, peasantry and petty bourgeoisie
3. The party of the working class and People's Army should be counted as the two basic organisations of people's war
4. These two organisations would be built during the period of struggle, based on the participation of the masses
5. THKO was a unique organisation, performing the functions of both of these two organisations simultaneously.

== Activities ==
The organization's headquarters was in room 201 of Middle East Technical University. In February 1971, the group kidnapped an American sergeant from a base in Ankara and held him in room 201 for 15 hours, before releasing him. Its leader, Deniz Gezmiş was charismatic and reportedly had relations with many women, as described by Christopher de Bellaigue:

Into his room at Ankara's Middle East Technical University, the famous room 201, he ushered a considerable number of tender, attractive, young women - captives to his piercing eye and cleft, proletarian jaw.

On March 27, 1972, the THKO abducted three NATO engineers (two of them British, one Canadian), working at a radar base in Ünye. The kidnapping was perpetrated in cooperation with another organization: the People's Liberation Party-Front of Turkey (THKP-C). The kidnappers tried to hide in the village of Kızıldere, but were discovered by the authorities who surrounded their hideout. In the following shootout the hostages and ten of the kidnappers were killed. One was caught alive.

On October 22, 1972, four students belonging to the THKO hijacked a Turkish airliner with 69 passengers on board after takeoff from Ankara. The aircraft was forced to change its course and eventually landed in Sofia, Bulgaria. During the hijacking one passenger and a pilot were injured and they were allowed to leave the plane together with the women who were released with their children. The four hijackers demanded the release of all political prisoners in Turkey, but after just one day they surrendered to the Bulgarian authorities.

== Division ==
THKO was crippled after the killing of Sinan Cemgil, Kadir Manga, Alpaslan Özdoğan at Nurhak; Cihan Alptekin and Ömer Ayna at Kızıldere; and after the execution of Deniz Gezmiş, Yusuf Aslan and Hüseyin İnan on May 6, 1972. However, the organization remained active during the 1970s.

Individuals benefiting from the political amnesty in 1974 and THKO cadres that were already outside of jail constituted a Temporary Central Committee. After the formation of the TCC internal differences arose. One group developed policies advocated by Chinese Communist Party-Party of Labour of Albania (later only PLA) and founded the Revolutionary Communist Party of Turkey (TDKP); another group adhering to the tendency of the Communist Party of the Soviet Union eventually founded the Communist Labour Party of Turkey (TKEP). A third sector refounded itself as the People's Liberation Army of Turkey-Revolutionary Path of Turkey.

== See also ==
- List of illegal political parties in Turkey
- People's Liberation Party-Front of Turkey
- 1971 Turkish military memorandum
