= Deniz Gezmiş =

Turkish revolutionary (1947–1972)

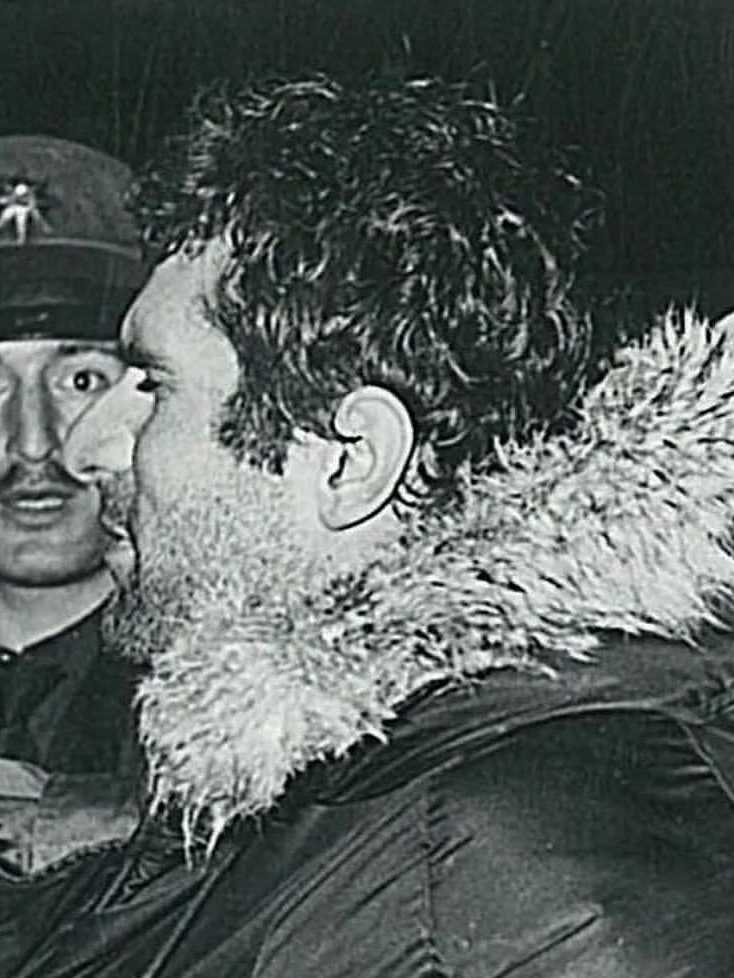
- Gezmiş in 1971
- Born: Deniz Gezmiş; 28 February 1947; Öznü Köyü, Erzurum, Turkey
- Died: 6 May 1972 (aged 25); Altındağ, Turkey
- Cause of death: Execution
- Education: Istanbul University
- Occupations: Militant, Student leader, Activist, Revolutionary
- Years active: 1965-1972
- Organization: THKO (1970-1972)
- Political party: Workers Party of Turkey
- Movement: Marxism–Leninism, Socialism, Guevarism, Communism, Kemalism
- Opponent(s): Idealism (Turkey), United States of America, United States Sixth Fleet, NATO
- Parent(s): Cemil Gezmiş; Mukaddes Gezmiş

Deniz Gezmiş (Turkish pronunciation: [deˈniz ɟezˈmiʃ], 27 February 1947 – 6 May 1972) was a Turkish Marxist-Leninist revolutionary, student leader, and political activist in Turkey in the late 1960s. He was one of the founding members of the People's Liberation Army of Turkey (THKO).

He was born to an inspector of primary education and syndicalist Cemil Gezmiş and a primary school teacher Mukaddes Gezmiş. He was educated in various Turkish cities. He spent most of his childhood in Sivas, where his father grew up. He graduated from high school in Istanbul where he first encountered left wing ideas. Gezmiş and companions are considered by some as "Turkey's Che Guevara and compañeros", whereas other right-wing figures consider him a terrorist.

== Political life ==
The identification of Deniz Gezmiş, issued by Democratic Front for the Liberation of Palestine and given during guerrilla training in 1969

Gezmiş reported that Yön magazine had very significant effects on his adoption of socialism. After joining the Workers Party of Turkey (Turkish: Türkiye İşçi Partisi), he studied law at Istanbul University in 1966. In the summer of 1968, he and around 15 other students founded the Revolutionary Student Union (Turkish: Devrimci Öğrenci Birliği). He also founded the Revolutionary Jurists Organisation (Turkish: Devrimci Hukukçular Kuruluşu).

Gezmiş became increasingly politically active, established the Revolutionary Jurists Association in January 1966 and was involved into the student-organized occupation of Istanbul University in June 1968. After the occupation was forcibly subdued, he spearheaded protests against the arrival of the US 6th Fleet in Istanbul, when several US soldiers were harmed and pushed into the sea on 17 July 1968. Deniz Gezmiş was arrested for these actions on 30 July 1968, and released on 20 October of the same year.

As he increased his involvement with the Worker's Party of Turkey, and began to advocate for a National Democratic Revolution, his ideas started to circulate and inspire a growing revolutionary student base. On 28 November 1968, he was arrested again after protesting US ambassador Robert Komer's visit to Turkey, but was later released. On 16 March 1969 he was arrested again for participating in right-wing and left-wing armed conflicts and imprisoned until 3 April. Gezmiş was re-arrested after leading Istanbul University Law Faculty students on a protest of the reformation bill on 31 May 1969. The university was temporarily closed, and Gezmiş was injured in the conflict. Although Gezmiş was under surveillance, he escaped from hospital and went to Palestine Liberation Organization camps in Jordan to receive guerrilla training. In 1969, Gezmiş led a group of students who "violently disrupted" a lecture American scholar Daniel Lerner was to give at Istanbul University.

During the 1960s, Gezmiş crossed paths with the infamous American Soviet/Russian CIA mole Aldrich Ames. While scouting for information on Soviet intelligence, Ames recruited one of Gezmiş's roommates, who gave him information about the membership and activities of Devrimci Gençlik (DEV-GENÇ), a Marxist youth group.

== Arrest and trial ==
In December 1970, Gezmiş and his comrades opened fire on two police officers guarding the US embassy in Ankara, injuring them both. In the following month, he was involved in a bank robbery.

On 4 March 1971, he and other members of the People's Liberation Army of Turkey (THKO) kidnapped four U.S. privates from the TUSLOG/The United States Logistics Group headquartered in Balgat, Ankara. Three young men delivered a news agency a note confirming the authorship of the THKO together with an ID or a relative of a soldier, demanding a ransom for the US soldiers by 6 p.m. Since a driver of the THKO was captured, a second note delivered to a Turkish news agency prolonged the deadline by 12 hours, this time demanding the release of the driver. After releasing the hostages, he and Yusuf Aslan were captured alive in Gemerek, Sivas following an armed stand-off with law enforcement officers Following Gezmiş was brought to Ankara and presented to the Turkish minister Haldun Menteşoğlu and the public.

Their trial began on 16 July 1971. They were accused for participating in a robbery of the Emek branch of İşbank in Ankara, and the abduction of US soldiers. Gezmiş, Yusuf Aslan and İnan were sentenced to death on 9 October for violating the Turkish Criminal Code's 146th article, which concerns attempts to "overthrow Constitutional order". According to legal procedure at that time, a death sentence had to be endorsed by Parliament before being sent to the President of the Republic for final assent. In March and April 1972 the sentence was placed before Parliament and in both readings the sentence was overwhelmingly approved. The Turkish parliament voted to execute him in a multi-partisan vote with 276 votes in favor and 48 against. Prime Minister at that time was Nihat Erim. Some politicians such as İsmet İnönü and Bülent Ecevit opposed the sentence, but others, amongst them Süleyman Demirel, Alparslan Türkeş and İsmet Sezgin voted in favor of it. He and his colleagues within the AP (Adalet Partisi – Justice Party) gave votes in favor of the executions, shouting, "Three from us, three from them!" – referring to the right-wing Democratic Party politicians (including former Prime Minister Adnan Menderes), who had been executed in 1961 after the Yassıada trials. The Republican People's Party (CHP) appealed to the Constitutional Court in order to impede the confirmation by the parliament should be cancelled, and the Constitutional Court overturned the decision made by the parliament. But the Parliament again constituted and reaffirmed the death sentence. In attempt to stop the execution of Gezmiş and two other prisoners, 11 militants of the People's Liberation Party – Front and the Turkey People's Liberation Army, amongst them Ertuğrul Kürkçü and Mahir Çayan kidnapped three technicians. They brought the technicians to Kizildere where they were surrounded by armed forces on 30 March 1972. All in the group including the hostages, except for Ertuğrul Kürkçü, were killed in the ensuing firefight. Other actions to overturn the verdict were manifestations in front of the Grand National Assembly of Turkey and a signature campaign initiated by Yaşar Kemal and other Turkish intellectuals.

On 3 May, President Cevdet Sunay also signed the decision to execute Gezmiş. He was executed by hanging on 6 May 1972 in Ankara Central Prison along with Hüseyin İnan and Yusuf Aslan.

His last request was to drink tea and listen to Concierto de Aranjuez, Joaquín Rodrigo's guitar concerto.

Long live a fully independent Turkey. Long live the great ideology of Marxism-Leninism. Long live the Turkish and Kurdish peoples' fight for independence. Damned be imperialism. Long live the workers and the villagers.

— Last words of Deniz Gezmiş.

== Aftermath ==
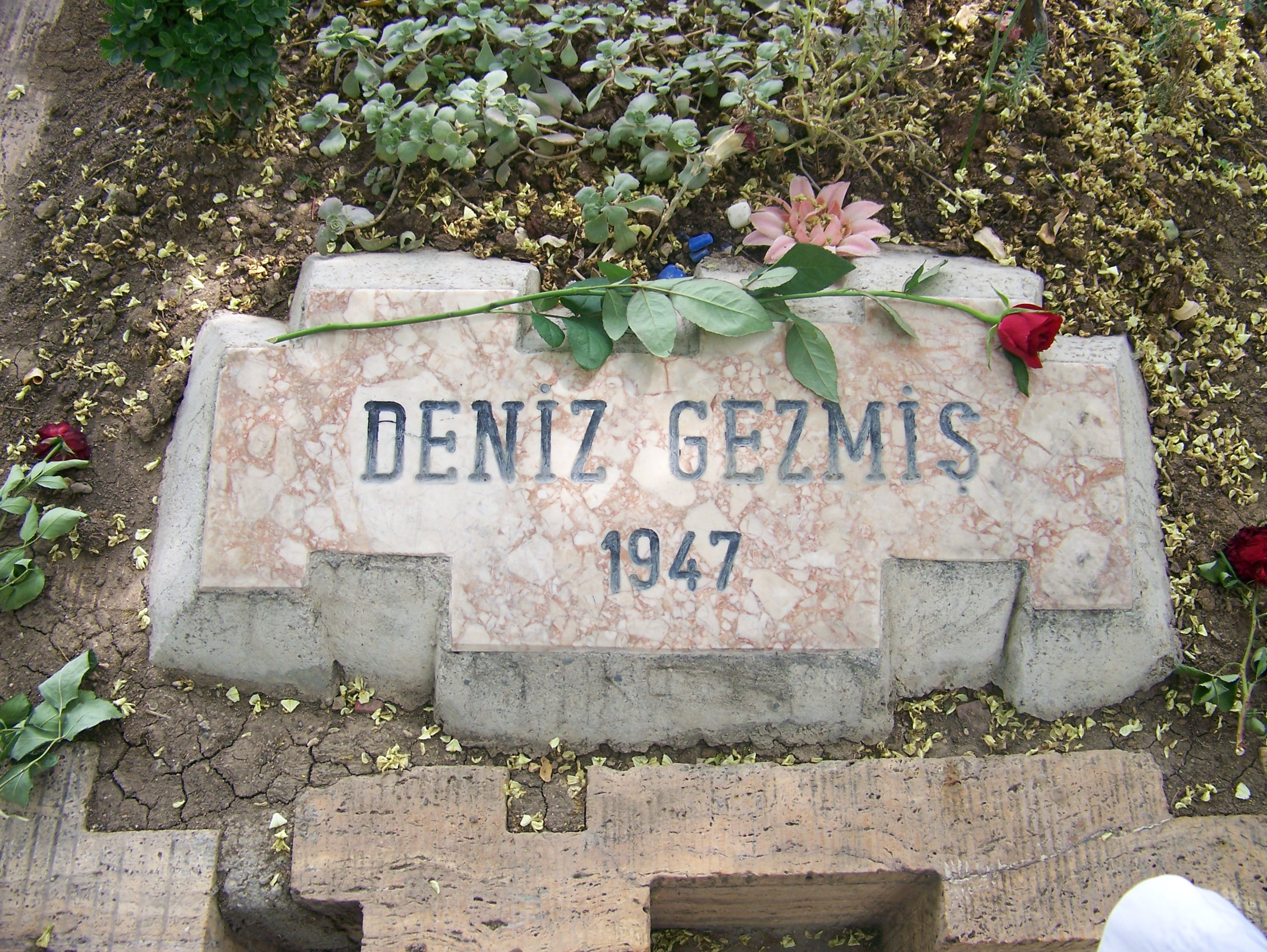
Gezmiş's grave in Karşıyaka Cemetery, Ankara

- Those who were executed on 6 May 1972 requested to be buried alongside Taylan Özgur in Ankara, but their last wish was not granted.
- In 1980, former prime minister Nihat Erim was assassinated by Devrimci Sol.
- In 1987, Süleyman Demirel, who had initially actively supported the executions, told a journalist who was interviewing him that the executions were "a mishap which occurred during the Cold War".
- While the executions of Deniz Gezmiş, Yusuf Aslan, and Hüseyin İnan under the 1970 military junta dealt a blow to the morale of the Left in Turkey, in the long run, they established the three youths as symbols under which the Turkish Left would gather. The conflict between the Right and Left continued to escalate within the 1970s with the Cold War in the backdrop, and would ultimately lead to the 1980 military coup.
- In 2015, Gezmiş's family founded the "Deniz Gezmiş Freedom and Independence Foundation" in order to "keep alive the memory of Deniz Gezmiş and his friends and the values they contributed to the revolutionary struggle."
