= 2020 in Turkey =

- Centuries: 20th; 21st
- Decades: 2000s; 2010s; 2020s; 2030s
- See also: List of years in Turkey

Events of 2020 in Turkey.

== Incumbents ==
- President: Recep Tayyip Erdoğan
- 29th Speaker of the Grand National Assembly: Mustafa Şentop
- President of the Constitutional Court: Zühtü Arslan
- Chief of the Turkish General Staff of the Armed Forces: Yaşar Güler
- Government: 66th government of Turkey
- Cabinet: Fourth Erdoğan Cabinet

== Events ==
=== Ongoing ===
- COVID-19 pandemic in Turkey
- 2016–present purges in Turkey
- 2018–2022 Turkish currency and debt crisis

=== January ===
- January 2: Turkey reports a new refugee influx and possible crisis, as 250,000 Syrians flee Syria for Turkey, due to Syrian government attacks on rebel groups around Idlib.
- January 6: The new building of the National Organization Agency (MİT) opened in Etimesgut, Ankara.
- January 7: Turkey signs maritime deal with Libya.
- January 11: A 4.9-magnitude earthquake occurred in Silivri.
- January 15: Turkey lifts its ban on Wikipedia, due to a ruling by the Turkish High Constitutional Court.
- January 24: 2020 Elazığ earthquake

=== February ===
- February 4–5: 2020 Van avalanches: two avalanches occurred near Bahçesaray, killing at least 41 people.
- February 5: Pegasus Airlines Flight 2193 was a scheduled domestic passenger flight from Izmir to Istanbul. The Boeing 737-800 operating the route skidded off the runway while landing at the Sabiha Gökçen International Airport. Three people were killed, 179 people were injured, and the aircraft was destroyed.
- February 23: 2020 Iran–Turkey earthquakes: the first one occurred on 23 February, near Khoy in north-west Iran, close to the border with Turkey, killing 9 people in Başkale, Van. It hit at 9:23 a.m. local time (05:53 UTC) with a magnitude of 5.8 M_{w}. About 10 hours later the same area was hit by another major earthquake of 6.0 M_{w}.
- February 27: During the peak of Operation Dawn of Idlib 2, the Syrian Arab Air Force, and possibly the Russian Air Force, conducted two airstrikes against a Turkish Army convoy in Balyun, Idlib. The strikes resulted in the deaths of 34 Turkish soldiers according to Turkish president Recep Tayyip Erdoğan. (see: 2020 Balyun airstrikes)

=== March ===
- March 1: Turkey started conducting Operation Spring Shield.
- March 11: The Ministry of Health confirms the first COVID-19 case in Turkey. (see: COVID-19 pandemic in Turkey)
- March 12: As part of the governmental measures for controlling the pandemic, primary and secondary schools were closed for 1 week from 16 March. Universities were also closed for 3 weeks.
- March 17: The first death from COVID-19 occurred in Turkey.
- March 21: A curfew was imposed by the government for people over 65.
- March 27: All educational programs were suspended until April 30 as a result of governmental measures for controlling the COVID-19 pandemic.

=== April ===
- April 3: A curfew was imposed by the government for people under 20.
- April 10: As a result of the coronavirus pandemic, a curfew was declared in 31 provinces.
- April 17: In order to control the spread of COVID-19, a curfew was declared in 31 provinces which was set to last over the weekend.
- April 20: Another curfew was announced by the government in 30 metropolitan municipalities and Zonguldak, restricting movement across the cities between April 23 and 27.
- April 27: Another curfew was announced by the government in 30 metropolitan municipalities and Zonguldak, restricting movement across the cities between 1–3 May.

=== June ===
- June 1: Prohibitions and measures introduced to combat the COVID-19 pandemic started to be gradually lifted. The normalization process began.
- June 14: An earthquake of 5.7 M_{w} hit Bingöl, Karlıova. One person was killed.
- June 15: Turkey launched an air attack on the areas used as a base by terrorists in northern Iraq under Operation Claw-Eagle.
- June 17:
  - Turkey launched Operation Claw-Tiger in Northern Iraq.
  - Turkish diplomat Volkan Bozkır is elected President of the 75th United Nations General Assembly. He was the sole candidate.

=== July ===
- July 3: An explosion occurred in the fireworks factory in Hendek. 6 workers died and 114 workers were injured.
- July 6: 450 hectares of forest were burned in the Ilgardere district of Gelibolu, Çanakkale. Transportation was stopped in the Dardanelles.
- July 7: The elections for choosing the Speaker of the Grand National Assembly was held. Mustafa Şentop was re-elected.
- July 10: Turkish President Recep Tayyip Erdogan annuls the Hagia Sophia's museum status, converting the site back into a mosque.

=== August ===
- August 21:
  - Turkey has found 320 billion cubic meters of natural gas in the biggest ever discovery in the Black Sea, and hopes to begin production by 2023. The Turkish drilling ship Fatih, had been carrying out exploration operations in the Tuna-1 sector in the western Black Sea for the past month.
  - President Recep Tayyip Erdoğan signed the decision to transfer the administration of the Chora Church to the Directorate of Religious Affairs and to open it for worship as a mosque, and the decision was published in the T.C. Resmî Gazete.
- August 23: Flood and landslide disaster occurred in Giresun Province and seven of its districts. 6 people died.
- August 25: Ahlat Mansion was opened during the 949th anniversary of Manzikert Victory.

=== September ===
- September 3: Otoyol 21, connecting Ankara and Tarsus, was put into service.
- September 17: Turkey's first flying car introduced as Cezeri, took off in Teknofest Gaziantep.
- September 21: In-person education following the COVID-19 pandemic started gradually, covering first grade and pre-school students.
- September 24: An earthquake of 4.2 magnitude occurred off Tekirdağ and Marmaraereğlisi.
- September 27: Turkish President Recep Tayyip Erdoğan announced that Turkey would support Azerbaijan during the 2020 Nagorno-Karabakh conflict.

=== October ===
- October 11: Forest fires that started in Belen, Hatay, spread to other districts. 400 hectares of forest burned.
- October 12: In-person education was enforced for students in the 2nd, 3rd, 4th, 8th and 12th grades.
- October 17: Erdoğan announced that 85 billion cubic meters of natural gas was discovered in the Black Sea.
- October 26: A suicide bombing perpetrated by the PKK occurred on Fener Street in İskenderun, injuring several people and killing the perpetrator.
- October 30: The 2020 Aegean Sea earthquake with an epicenter close to the Gulf of Kuşadası caused building damages and tsunami on the Turkish west coast. More than 110 people were killed and over 1100 were injured.

=== November ===
- November 2: In person education started gradually for students, including 5th and 12th grades.
- November 5: With the circular issued by the Ministry of Interior, new measures were announced to combat the COVID-19 pandemic.
- November 9: Treasury and Finance Minister Berat Albayrak's request for resignation was accepted by President Recep Tayyip Erdoğan and Lütfi Elvan was appointed as the new Minister of Treasury and Finance.
- November 15: The Turkish Grand Prix was held for the first time after nine years.
- November 18: With the circular issued by the Ministry of Internal Affairs, curfews and many new measures were introduced to be enforced on weekends, excluding activities occurring between 10:00 am – 08:00 pm.

=== December ===
- December 10: The ministry of health announced the total number of coronavirus cases in Turkey as 1,748,567.
- December 14: The United States Department of the Treasury issued sanctions against the Presidency of Defense Industries.
- December 30: 3 million units of CoronaVac were delivered to Turkey.

== Deaths ==
- 17 January – Rahşan Ecevit, politician (b. 1923)
- 19 January – Kazım Ayvaz, wrestler (b. 1938)
- 25 January – Garbis Zakaryan, boxer (b. 1930)
- 14 February – Hilmi Ok, football referee (b. 1932)
- 17 February – Mustafa Yücedağ, footballer (b. 1966)
- 25 February – Hikmet Köksal, military officer (b. 1932)
- 2 March – Suat Yalaz, comic book artist (b. 1932)
- 15 March – Aytaç Yalman, military officer (b. 1940)
- 20 March –
  - Cengiz Bektaş, architect (b. 1934)
  - Muhterem Nur, actress and singer (b. 1932)
- 24 March – Nihat Akbay, footballer (b. 1945)
- 28 March – Fevzi Aksoy, academic and columnist (b. 1930)
- 31 March – Turhan Kaya, actor (b. 1951)
- 2 April – Feriha Öz, pathologist (b. 1933)
- 3 April –
  - Helin Bölek, singer (b. 1992)
  - Yusuf Kenan Sönmez, politician (b. 1948)
- 14 April – Haydar Baş, politician (b. 1947)
- 15 April – Ülkü Azrak, academic (b. 1933)
- 27 April – Nur Yerlitaş, fashion designer (b. 1955)
- 3 May – Ömer Döngeloğlu, theologian (b. 1968)
- 9 June – Ayşegül Atik, actress (b. 1948)
- 13 June – Ziya Müezzinoğlu, Turkish economist, diplomat and politician (born 1919)
- 7 July – Jale Aylanç, actress (b. 1948)
- 14 July – Adalet Ağaoğlu, novelist and playwright (b. 1929)
- 17 July – Seyfi Dursunoğlu, performing artist and comedian (b. 1932)
- 31 August – Haldun Boysan, actor (b. 1958)
- 15 September – Suna Kıraç, businesswoman (b. 1941)
- 16 October – Markar Esayan, author, journalist and politician (b. 1969)
- 18 October – Bekir Coşkun, journalist, author (b. 1945)
- 26 October – Osman Durmuş, physician and former Minister of Health (b. 1947)
- 30 October – Mesut Yılmaz, politician, former prime minister and former leader of the Motherland Party (b. 1947)
- 1 November –
  - Burhan Kuzu, politician and lawyer (b. 1955)
  - Yalçın Granit, basketball player, coach and sports journalist (b. 1932)
- 6 November – Timur Selçuk, musician and conductor (b. 1946)
- 7 November – Gli, European Shorthair cat and an Internet celebrity (b. 2004)
- 19 November – Reşit Karabacak, wrestler (b. 1954)
- 17 December – Tuncay Mataracı, politician and former minister (b. 1935)
- 22 December – Özkan Sümer, former footballer and coach (b. 1940)
- 25 December – Engin Nurşani, folk musician (b. 1984)

== See also ==
- History of Turkey
- Outline of Turkey
- Government of Turkey
- Politics of Turkey

=== Lists of military officials ===
- List of chiefs of the Turkish General Staff
- List of commanders of the Turkish Land Forces
- List of commanders of the Turkish Naval Forces
- List of commanders of the Turkish Air Force
- List of commandants of the Turkish Coast Guard
