= Maoist insurgency in Turkey =

Ongoing low-level insurgency in eastern Turkey

- Part of Terrorism in Turkey
Date	24 April 1972 – present (54 years, 4 months and 4 days)
Location	Turkey, mainly in Tunceli Province
Status	Ongoing

Belligerents
Government of Turkey	TKP/ML; TİKKO; MKP; Maoist Party Centre; HBDH

Commanders and leaders
Recep Tayyip Erdoğan (since 2014); Yaşar Güler (since 2023); Metin Gürak (since 2023); Ali Yerlikaya (since 2023); Former: Abdullah Gül (2007–14); Ahmet Necdet Sezer (2000–07); Süleyman Demirel (1993–2000); Turgut Özal (1989–93); Kenan Evren (1980–89); Fahri Korutürk (1973–80); Cevdet Sunay (1972–73); Hulusi Akar (2018-23); Nurettin Canikli (2017-18); Fikri Işık (2016-17); İsmet Yılmaz (2011-15, 2015-16); Vecdi Gönül (2002-11, 2015); Sabahattin Çakmakoğlu (1999-2002); Hikmet Sami Türk (1999); İsmet Sezgin (1997-99); Turhan Kaya (1996-97); Mahmut Oltan Sungurlu (1996); Vefa Tanır (1995-96); Mehmet Gölhan (1993-95); Nevzat Ayaz (1991-93); Barlas Doğu (1991); Mehmet Yazar (1991); Hüsnü Doğan (1990-91); Safa Giray (1989-90); Ercan Vuralhan (1987-89); Zeki Yavuztürk (1983-87); Ümit Haluk Bayülken (1980-83); Ahmet İhsan Birincioğlu (1979-80); Neşet Akmandor (1979); Hasan Esat Işık (1974, 1977, 1978-79); Turhan Kapanlı (1977-78); Sadettin Bilgiç (1977); Ferit Melen (1975-77); İlhami Sancar (1973-74, 1974-75); Mehmet İzmen (1972-73); Yaşar Güler (2018-23); Hulusi Akar (2015-18); Necdet Özel (2011-15); Işık Koşaner (2010-11); İlker Başbuğ (2008-10); Yaşar Büyükanıt (2006-08); Hilmi Özkök (2002-06); Hüseyin Kıvrıkoğlu (1998-2002); İsmail Hakkı Karadayı (1994-98); Doğan Güreş (1990-94); Necip Torumtay (1987-90); Necdet Üruğ (1983-87); Nurettin Ersin (1983); Kenan Evren (1978-83); Semih Sancar (1973-78); Faruk Gürler (1972-73); Süleyman Soylu (2016-23); Efkan Ala (2013-15, 2015-16); Selami Altınok (2015); Sebahattin Öztürk (2015); Muammer Güler (2013); İdris Naim Şahin (2011-13); Osman Güneş (2007, 2011); Beşir Atalay (2007-11); Abdülkadir Aksu (1989-91, 2002-07); Muzaffer Ecemiş (2002); Rüştü Kazım Yücelen (2001-02); Sadettin Tantan (1999-2001); Cahit Bayar (1999); Kutlu Aktaş (1998-99); Murat Başesgioğlu (1997-98); Meral Akşener (1996-97); Mehmet Ağar (1996); Ülkü Güney (1996); Teoman Ünüsan (1995-96); Nahit Menteşe (1993-95); Beytullah Mehmet Gazioğlu (1993); İsmet Sezgin (1991-93); Sabahattin Çakmakoğlu (1991); Mustafa Kalemli (1987-89, 1991); Ahmet Selçuk (1987); Yıldırım Akbulut (1984-87); Ali Tanrıyar (1983-84); Selahattin Çetiner (1980-83); Orhan Eren (1980); Mehmet Gölcügil (1979-80); Vecdi İlhan (1979); Hasan Fehmi Güneş (1979); İrfan Özaydınlı (1978-79); Korkut Özal (1977-78); Necdet Uğur (1977); Sabahattin Özbek (1977); Oğuzhan Asiltürk (1974, 1975-77); Mukadder Öztekin (1973-74, 1974-75); Ferit Kubat (1972-73)	İbrahim Kaypakkaya (executed); Süleyman Cihan †; Kazım Çelik †; Mehmet Demirdağ †; Cüneyt Kahraman †; Cafer Cangöz †; Nubar Ozanyan †

Units involved
Ministry of National Defence; Turkish Armed Forces; Land Forces; Air Force; Naval Forces; ÖKK; Ministry of Interior; EGM; Riot Police; PÖH; Gendarmerie General Command; JİT; Ministry of Foreign Affairs	Martyr Nubar Ozanyan Brigade; People's Partisan Forces; Dersim Regional Committee

Strength
23,500 (2008)	Unknown

Casualties and losses
- More than 700 dead in total >100,000 displaced.

The Maoist insurgency in Turkey, referred by the Maoists as the People's War (Turkish: Halk savaşı), is an ongoing low-level insurgency in eastern Turkey between the Turkish government and Maoist rebels that began in the early 1970s. The insurgency declined in the late 1980s and 1990s and has been sidelined by the larger Kurdish–Turkish conflict (1978–2025). Low-level armed attacks continue to be carried out by Maoist insurgent groups, the most significant of which are the Liberation Army of the Workers and Peasants of Turkey (TİKKO) (the armed wing of the Communist Party of Turkey/Marxist–Leninist) and the People's Liberation Army (HKO) and People's Partisan Forces (PHG), both armed wings of the Maoist Communist Party.

== Background ==
On 24 April 1972, the Communist Party of Turkey/Marxist–Leninist (TKP/ML, sometimes incorrectly referred to as Partizan after the name of one of its publications) was formed by a radical group led by İbrahim Kaypakkaya, and intended to wage a people's war. However, a year later, Kaypakkaya was captured, tortured, and killed. In 1978, it had its first conference, affirming its plan for guerrilla warfare, although the idea of armed rebellion remained in theory with little progress made to fruition. The TKP/ML was involved in political violence between left and right wing groups in the 1970s.

In the late 1980s, the TKP/ML suffered from a series of splits following the party's second congress. In 1993, the TKP/ML attempted unsuccessfully to reunify with the Maoist Communist Party (Turkey)

On 17 May 1985, the TKP/ML broadcast a propaganda message to millions of television viewers in Istanbul, replacing the soundtrack for the evening news.

== Insurgency ==
=== 1970s–1980s ===
TKP/ML's military wing, the Liberation Army of the Workers and Peasants of Turkey (TİKKO), carried out militant and guerrilla actions in the late 1970s and throughout the 1980s, mainly in the Tunceli Province, whose inhabitants saw the Maoist guerrilla war as revenge for the repression of the Dersim rebellion in 1938. TİKKO reached its height during this period, carrying out guerrilla warfare in the mountainous areas of the Tunceli and Black Sea regions.

The first clash between the TKP/ML and the Gendarmerie took place on January 24, 1973. Gendarmerie units under the command of Fehmi Altınbilek were advancing towards the hamlet of Vartinik, the camp where İbrahim Kaypakkaya was located. Since the guard they put on had fallen asleep, they were unable to notice the raid on the camp. Ali Haydar woke up first and defended the camp against the Gendarmerie with his hunting rifle, but was shot after firing a single bullet. The others were able to escape because the Gendarmerie was busy with Ali Haydar, but İbrahim Kaypakkaya was shot and wounded in the meantime.

Some of the other conflicts that TIKKO was involved in between the 1970s and 1990s are as follows:

- Izmir: On 2–10 September 1980, they showed armed resistance to the police's calls to surrender in the Arapdere area of Izmir.
- Diyarbakır: On January 24, 1981, Haydar Aslan and İhsan Parcacı, who were reported by the administrator of Kırmataş village, clashed with the police and were killed. As a result, the administrator who reported them to the police was killed by TIKKO militants.
- Istanbul: Law Enforcement Forces surrounded the house taken over by the TIKKO in Maltepe, Kartal, Istanbul, on July 19, 1992.
- Dersim: The Temporary Winter Camp near Pülümür, where TIKKO's 2nd District Unit was withdrawn, was exposed by the TSK and placed under siege on January 21, 1993. When the guerrilla units learn that the camp is under siege, they place their units on all the mountain tops around the camp. The enemy starts intense bombardment with 3 bomber planes and 3 Cobra helicopters taken from Erzurum. However, the enemy cannot get close to the guerrilla units, nor can they inflict losses. On the one hand, intense winter conditions and on the other hand, enemy attacks force the guerrilla units to leave the region.
- Erzincan: In the evening hours of April 15, 1995, Halil Çakıroğlu, Süheyla Dağdeviren and Munzur Keskin were killed as a result of the TSK's attack with thermal camera weapons against the TIKKO unit that was on the move, around the Tımığı (Yağça) Village of Erzincan Kemah.
- Dersim: TKP-ML, which will hold its 3rd Conference at the end of November 1986, together with TIKKO guerrillas, TKP-ML 3rd Conference delegates are in Dersim for the preparations for the conference. TSK, receiving notice that TKP-ML Conference delegates and TIKKO fighters were wandering around the region, began a military operation by building a military buildup in the region. With the tips they received, they intensified their operations in Husun and especially in the Mercanlar region. On November 21, the region was completely surrounded. Realizing the siege, the 3rd Conference delegates try to leave the region. The guerrillas in position do not have enough weapons and ammunition to break the circle. Many of them have Hunting Rifles only. Many TKP/ML militants were killed in the conflicts

=== 2000s ===
In 2000, Turkish security forces launched operations against TİKKO insurgents in the provinces of Tokat and Sivas. Discovering 12 hideouts, they recovered nine machine guns, four rocket launchers, grenades, and explosives, as well as 10 tonnes of food and medicine.

- On 11 December 2000, TİKKO insurgents open fire on a police special task force, killing two and wounding 12.
- In 2001, police captured five insurgents and weapons including two 9K111 Fagot anti-tank missiles.
- In March 2009, Tamer Bilici, a doctor in service during a 2000 hunger strike in Kandıra F-type prison, was "in front of his house punished with death" by MKP-HKO for being a public enemy because he was blamed for the deaths and permanent disabilities of inmates. In September 2009, MKP-HKO claimed responsibility for the death of a retired colonel, Aytekin İçmez.

=== 2010s ===
==== 2010–2014 ====
- Tunceli: On 29 June 2010, two guerrillas of the TİKKO were killed in the mountains of Tunceli by the Turkish state forces.
- Tunceli: On 2 February 2011, five guerrillas of TİKKO in Tunceli died as a result of an avalanche.
- Tunceli: On 15 November 2012, 24 guerrillas of HKO were surrounded and captured in Tunceli.
- Tunceli: On 26 July 2013, the control building of a hydroelectric power plant regulator was bombed in the countryside of Tunceli Province by TİKKO militants.
- Tunceli: 14 March 2014, TİKKO guerrillas attacked a police station in Tunceli. TKP/ML declared that the attack was revenge for the death of Berkin Elvan.
- Tunceli: On 8 July 2014, TİKKO guerrillas stopped a truck carrying five workers to a base station at Altınyüzük and set the vehicle on fire.
- Tunceli: On 15 August 2014, TiKKO guerrillas attacked a Gendarmerie Station in Ovacik. No casualties were reported.

==== 2015–2018 ====
- In June 2015, MKP-PHG killed former colonel Fehmi Altinbilek.
- Tunceli: On 22 July, TİKKO guerrillas attacked a Gendarmerie Station in Hozat. No casualties were reported.
- Tunceli: 10 October, guerrillas of the PKK and the TKP / ML-TİKKO attacked the military base of Geyiksuyu in the province of Tunceli.
- Tunceli: On 15 October, TİKKO guerrillas attacked the military base of Amukta, in Hozat county.
- Tunceli: On 21 October, three TİKKO guerrillas died in a clash with TSK in Ovacık. The funeral of guerrillas was attended by hundreds of people, who sang songs and shouted revolutionary slogans.
- Tunceli: 9 May 2016, two TİKKO guerrillas were killed in Geyiksuyu, Tunceli during a clash with TSK Soldiers.
- Tunceli: Between 24 and 28 November, 12 guerrillas of TKP/ML TİKKO died during an army operation at Aliboğazı region of the Tunceli province.
- Istanbul: On 10 February 2017, TİKKO fighters set fire to the AKP headquarter in Pendik district.
- Tunceli: On 18 June, MKP-HKO guerrillas attacked the military base of Kuşluca in Tunceli, Halkin Günlüğü claimed the attack killed two soldiers and wounded one.
- Tunceli: On 1 August, three MKP-HKO guerrillas were killed in a clash with TSK in Ovacık.
- Tunceli: 18 August, two MKP-HKO guerrillas died when they were surrounded in Hozat by the armed forces.
- Tunceli: On 26 September, two MKP-HKO guerrillas were killed by TSK soldiers in Ovacık.
- On 16 November, four MKP-HKO guerrillas were killed in clashes with TSK.
- Tunceli: On 24 April 2018, two female TİKKO guerrillas were killed and another was captured by TSK Soldiers in.
- Tunceli: On 5/6 August, six TİKKO guerrillas were killed by the Turkish Army.

==== 2022-present ====
- Istanbul: January 15, a group of militants hung a banner in Istanbul reinforced with explosives in honour of other TKP/ML militants who had been killed.
- Istanbul: February 4, TIKKO affiliated groups blocked a street in Istanbul with firebombs to celebrate the 50th anniversary of the party's foundation.
- Istanbul: Militants attacked the police station in Gulsuyu neighbourhood of Istanbul with a bomb.

== Popular support ==
The TKP-ML came to be the most influential socialist organisation within Tunceli’s society to the point that they became an organic component of their politico-cultural collective belonging. Individuals supported by ideological descendants of the TKP-ML in Dersim received a third of votes in elections in 2009.

== In culture ==
- Some songs of music bands such as Grup Munzur and Grup Yorum refer to insurgency in Dersim.
- Dersim'de Doğan Güneş

== See also ==
- Kurdistan Workers' Party insurgency
- Political violence in Turkey (1976–1980)
- DHKP/C insurgency in Turkey
- Gezi Park protests
- Armed resistance in Chile (1973–1990)
- New People's Army rebellion
- Colombian conflict
- Peruvian conflict
- Naxalite–Maoist insurgency
- Maoist insurgency in Bangladesh
