= YDG =

YDG may stand for:

- YDG, IATA code of Digby/Annapolis Regional Airport
- Yang Dong-geun, South Korean hip-hop artist (born 1979)
- Yeni Demokratik Gençlik, youth organization of the Confederation of Workers from Turkey in Europe
- A US Navy hull classification symbol: Degaussing craft (YDG)

== See also ==
- YDG SRA protein domain
- YDG-H, rebel group of young PKK sympathizers in Turkey
