= Bolshevik Party (North Kurdistan – Turkey) =

Bolshevik Party (North Kurdistan – Turkey) Bolşevik Parti (Kuzey Kürdistan-Türkiye)
- Founded: 1981
- Split from: TKP/ML (As Communist Party of Turkey/Marxist-Leninist (Bolshevik))
- Newspaper: Bolshevik Partisan Sterka Bolshevik Bolshevik Revolution
- Ideology: Communism; Marxism-Leninism; Anti-revisionism
- International affiliation: ICMLPO (defunct); ICOR
- Colors: Red

Website
- www.bolsevikparti.org geocities.com/bolsevik_partizan/

Bolshevik Party (North Kurdistan-Turkey) (in Turkish: Bolşevik Parti (Kuzey Kürdistan-Türkiye), abbreviated BP(KK-T)) is a clandestine Marxist-Leninist party organization in Turkey. It was founded as the Communist Party of Turkey/Marxist-Leninist (Bolshevik) in 1981, following a split from the Communist Party of Turkey/Marxist-Leninist.

Although having the denomination "Kurdistan" in its title the party is not a Kurdish nationalist organisation, instead it follows the Leninist concept of the brotherhood of peoples.

== History ==
Communist Party of Turkey/Marxist-Leninist was established in 1972 by İbrahim Kaypakkaya who was a former member of the Revolutionary Workers and Peasants Party of Turkey. Following the military memorandum of 1971 the Turkish government cracked down the communist movement in Turkey. Kaypakkaya and several of his colleagues were arrested. The party machinery was destroyed. Kaypakkaya died in prison in 1973 because of torture.

Between 1973 and 1978 the disfragmented party re-organized. The first party congress took place in 1978 (TKP/ML I. Kongresi in Turkish). In 1981 the second congress was organized (TKP/ML II. Kongresi). Between 1978 and 1981 the party circles were deeply involved in ideological discussion and carried out contacts with their German and Austrian counterparts. Two different lines, conceived as the bolshevik and the menshevik, appeared.

According to the bolshevik side the mensheviks, despite being a minority, carried out secret meetings and gained the control of the party. As a result, the bolsheviks decided to split up and established the Bolshevik Party (North Kurdistan-Turkey).

== Statute ==
The statute (also called organisational rules) of the party regulates membership, the organisation principle of democratic centralism, party structure, party discipline and the financial resources of the party.

== Activities ==
Bolshevik Party (North Kurdistan-Turkey)'s final target is carrying out a revolution in Turkey. However the party does not seem to ever have the capacity to reach that target. Its political activities are limited to organising demonstrations and carrying out propaganda.

The party considers itself part of the international communist movement and participates in International Conference of Marxist-Leninist Parties and Organizations.

It gives a special importance to organising women.

The organisation is critical of the so-called death fasts carried in protest to changing conditions in Turkish prisons because of tactical reasons.

According to its website the party has three periodical publications: Bolşevik Partizan (Bolshevik Partizan), Sterka Bolşevik (in Kurdish) and Bolşevik Devrim (Bolshevik Revolution). The organisation has also published eight book/booklets and some special issues of Bolşevik Partizan dedicated to specific issues.

== Terrorist Status ==
Communist Party of Turkey/Marxist-Leninist, from where Bolshevik Party (North Kurdistan-Turkey) has split, is listed among the 12 active terrorist organisations in Turkey according to Counter-Terrorism and Operations Department of Directorate General for Security (Turkish police). That party has an armed wing named Turkish Workers' and Peasants' Liberation Army (Türk İşci ve Köylü Kurtuluş Ordusu, abbreviated as TİKKO). However the Bolshevik Party (North Kurdistan-Turkey) itself has no such wing and is not on the list.

== See also ==
- List of illegal political parties in Turkey
- Communist Party of Turkey (disambiguation), for other groups using similar names
