= Maoist Communist Party (Turkey) =

Maoist Communist Party Maoist Komünist Partisi
- Abbreviation: MKP
- General Secretary: None
- Founder: Cafer Cangöz
- Founded: On April 18, 1994, as TKP/ML, On September 15, 2002, as MKP
- Split from: TKP/ML
- Youth wing: Maoist Youth Union
- Women's wing: Maoist Women's Union
- Armed wing: People's Liberation Army; People's Partisan Forces
- Ideology: Communism; Marxism–Leninism–Maoism
- Political position: Far-left
- National affiliation: HBDH
- European affiliation: Conference of Communist and Workers' Parties of the Balkans
- International affiliation: RIM (inactive); IFB

Party flag

The Maoist Communist Party of Turkey (Turkish: Maoist Komünist Partisi abbreviated as MKP) is a Marxist–Leninist–Maoist insurgent organization in Turkey. It is the most significant of the Maoist organisations in Turkey; it upholds the legacy of İbrahim Kaypakkaya. It maintains two armed wings: the People's Partisan Forces (Turkish: Partizan Halk Güçleri or PHG) and People's Liberation Army (Turkish: Halk Kurtuluş Ordusu or HKO).

MKP was a part of Revolutionary Internationalist Movement and participated in the Conference of Communist and Workers' Parties of the Balkans.

== History ==
MKP emerged in 1987 as TKP/ML - Eastern Anatolia Regional Committee (Doğu Anadolu Bölge Komitesi in Turkish, abbreviated as DABK) and broke away from the declining TKP/ML organisation. In 1993 it reunified with TKP/ML, but this proved unsuccessful; it broke away again in 1994 to become the Communist Party of Turkey (Marxist–Leninist) [abbreviated as TKP(ML) - not to be confused with TKP/ML]. After an increasing ideological divide between the TKP/ML and TKP (ML), this led to incidents such as the absence of TKP/ML from the Revolutionary Internationalist Movement.

In 2003 TKP (ML) took the name Maoist Communist Party (MKP). MKP took up the legacy of TKP (ML), weathered severe battles, and over the years gained influence, becoming a significant Maoist organisation in Turkey and North Kurdistan. Though information on the organization is limited, it seems that there was a split in the MKP after the dissolution of the RIM.

Today, and for some years, there are two such organizations which consider themselves to descend from the TKP (ML): the "Maoist Komünist Parti" and the "Maoist Komünist Partisi".

Compared to the "Parti", the "Maoist Komünist Partisi" is ideologically close to the TKP/ML, especially the ideas of its founder Ibrahim Kaypakkaya. However, it is also of the opinion, which is a somewhat unique and questionable perspective given his common association with the TKP/ML, that Kaypakkaya had 'primarily' led their own predecessor, the TKP (ML).

In comparison to the "Partisi", the "Maoist Komünist Parti", while claiming no direct links to the PKK, and having a separate ideology, does seem to have a political agenda which prioritizes them more, considering them a primary force of New Democracy.

Like TKP/ML, MKP is determined to carry out a People's War: "In the final analysis, we are aware that with the devastating power and angry fire of our People's War, we will destroy the reactionary order and overthrow the reactionary class powers."

The armed wing of the major group, the "Partisi", is the People's Liberation Army (HKO). In 2013 the Party's 3rd congress established the People's Partisan Forces (PHG) as a second, urban, armed wing.

== Organisation ==
Flag of HKO

Flag of PHG

The party has two armed wings: in rural areas Peoples' Liberation Army (Halk Kurtuluş Ordusu in Turkish, abbreviated as HKO) and in cities People's Partisan Forces (Partizan Halk Güçleri in Turkish, abbreviated as PHG).

Maoist Youth Union (Turkish: Maoist Gençlik Birliği) is the youth organization of MKP.

Maoist Women's Union (Turkish: Maoist Kadınlar Birliği) - is women's organization of MKP.

The party has two periodicals titled Devrimci Demokrasi (Revolutionary Democracy) and Sınıf Teorisi (Theory of the Class).

Federation of Democratic Rights (Turkish: Demokratik Haklar Federasyonu abbreviated as DHF) - is independent mass organization related to MKP.

== Recent activity ==
In March 2009, Tamer Bilici, a doctor in service during a 2000 hunger strike in Kandıra F-type prison, was punished by MKP-HKO for being a public enemy because he was blamed for deaths and permanent disabilities of inmates. In September 2009 MKP-HKO claimed responsibility for the death of a retired colonel, Aytekin İçmez. In June 2015, MKP-PHG killed former colonel Fehmi Altinbilek.

== Designation as a terrorist organisation ==
The organisation is listed among the 12 active terrorist organisations in Turkey as of 2007 according to Counter-Terrorism and Operations Department of Directorate General for Security (Turkish police).

== Human resources ==
A study carried out by the Counter-Terrorism and Operations Department of Directorate General for Security over a sample of files about people convicted of being terrorists under Turkish laws including 826 militants from the organisation and the three other currently active left-wing organisations (see reference 1) 65% of the members are aged 14 to 25, 16,8% 25 to 30 and 17,5% are older than 30. University graduates make up 20,4% of the members, high school graduates 33,5%, secondary school graduates 14%, primary school graduates 29.9% and illiterates 1,9% (while they have no sampled literate non-graduate members).

== See also ==
- Maoist insurgency in Turkey
- List of anti-revisionist groups
