= UHRF1 =

Protein-coding gene in the species Homo sapiens

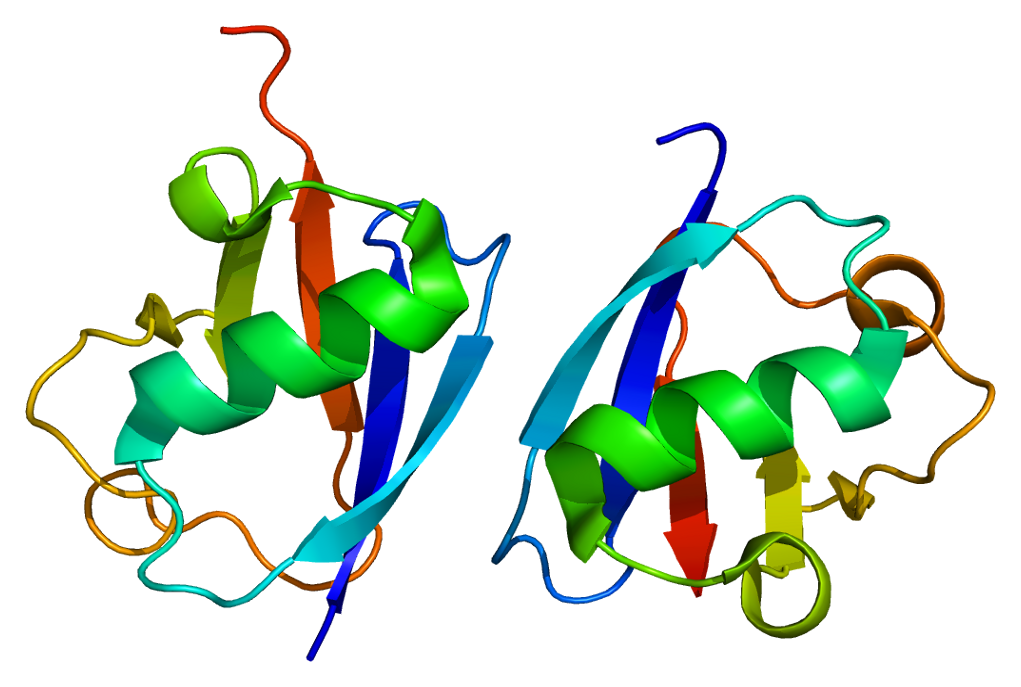

Identifiers
- Aliases: UHRF1, ICBP90, Np95, RNF106, hNP95, hhuNp95, TDRD22, ubiquitin like with PHD and ring finger domains 1
- External IDs: OMIM: 607990; MGI: 1338889; GeneCards: UHRF1
Available structures
PDB	Ortholog search: PDBe RCSB
PDB	List of PDB id codes 2FAZ, 2L3R, 2LGG, 2LGK, 2LGL, 2PB7, 3ASK, 3ASL, 3BI7, 3CLZ, 3DB3, 3DB4, 3DWH, 3FL2, 3SHB, 3SOU, 3SOW, 3SOX, 3T6R, 3ZVY, 3ZVZ, 4GY5, 4QQD, 5C6D, 5IAY
Enzyme activity
EC #	BRENDA	ExPASy	KEGG	MetaCyc
2.3.2.27	↗	↗	↗	↗

Gene location (Human)
Chr.	Chromosome 19 (human)
Band	19p13.3	Start	4,903,080 bp
Band	19p13.3	End	4,962,154 bp

Gene location (Mouse)
Chr.	Chromosome 17 (mouse)
Band	17|17 D	Start	56,610,321 bp
Band	17|17 D	End	56,630,486 bp
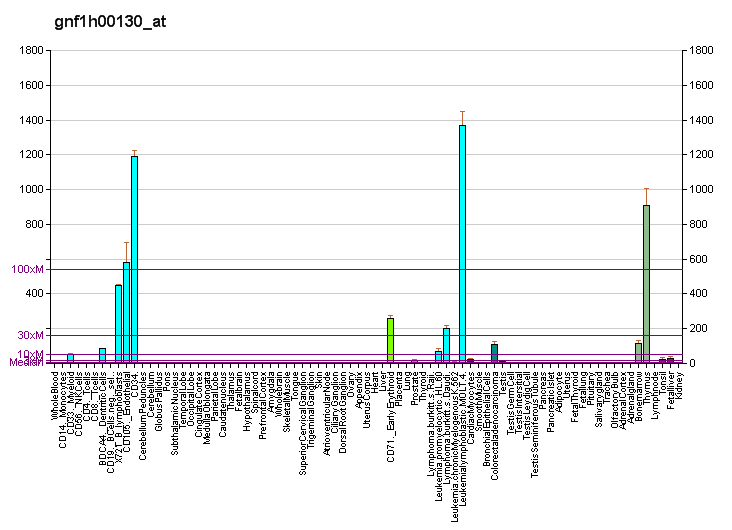
RNA expression pattern
Bgee	Human / Mouse (ortholog); Top expressed in: oocyte; secondary oocyte; thymus; ventricular zone; ganglionic eminence; buccal mucosa cell; trabecular bone; mucosa of ileum; bone marrow; stromal cell of endometrium / Top expressed in: secondary oocyte; primary oocyte; maxillary prominence; tail of embryo; zygote; mandibular prominence; abdominal wall; dermis; epiblast; medullary collecting duct; More reference expression data
BioGPS	More reference expression data
Gene ontology
Molecular function	DNA binding; ubiquitin protein ligase activity; hemi-methylated DNA-binding; DNA-binding transcription factor activity; methyl-CpG binding; cis-regulatory region sequence-specific DNA binding; metal ion binding; ubiquitin-protein transferase activity; methylated histone binding; protein binding; identical protein binding; transferase activity; zinc ion binding; histone binding
Cellular component	euchromatin; nuclear matrix; replication fork; heterochromatin; nucleus
Biological process	histone monoubiquitination; positive regulation of protein metabolic process; regulation of transcription, DNA-templated; maintenance of DNA methylation; positive regulation of DNA topoisomerase (ATP-hydrolyzing) activity; negative regulation of transcription by RNA polymerase II; transcription, DNA-templated; regulation of DNA methylation-dependent heterochromatin assembly; cellular response to DNA damage stimulus; protein ubiquitination; cell cycle; cell population proliferation; histone ubiquitination; DNA repair; positive regulation of transcription by RNA polymerase II; protein autoubiquitination; chromatin organization; ubiquitin-dependent protein catabolic process; regulation of epithelial cell proliferation
Sources:Amigo / QuickGO
Orthologs
Databases	NCBI: entry; OMA: entry
Species	Human	Mouse
Entrez	29128	18140
Ensembl	ENSG00000276043	ENSMUSG00000001228
UniProt	Q96T88	Q8VDF2
RefSeq (mRNA)	NM_001048201; NM_001290050; NM_001290051; NM_001290052; NM_013282	NM_001111078; NM_001111079; NM_001111080; NM_010931
RefSeq (protein)	NP_001041666; NP_001276979; NP_001276980; NP_001276981; NP_037414	NP_001104548; NP_001104549; NP_001104550; NP_035061
Location (UCSC)	Chr 19: 4.9 – 4.96 Mb	Chr 17: 56.61 – 56.63 Mb
PubMed search
- Wikidata
View/Edit Human	View/Edit Mouse

Ubiquitin-like, containing PHD and RING finger domains, 1, also known as UHRF1, is a protein which in humans is encoded by the UHRF1 gene. It acts as an epigenetic regulator that links DNA methylation to histone modifications and has been implicated in several key cellular processes, including DNA replication, the maintenance of DNA methylation, and the repair of DNA damage. Because it coordinates several layers of epigenetic regulation, it is considered an integrative epigenetic hub. The gene is overexpressed in numerous cancer types, making it a potential therapeutic target. Several transcript variants encoding distinct isoforms have been identified, and a related pseudogene is present on chromosome 12.

== Structure ==
UHRF1 has five conserved domains; a ubiquitin-like domain (UBL), a tandem tudor domain (TTD), a plant homeodomain (PHD), a SET and RING associated (SRA) domain, and a Really Interesting New Gene (RING) domain.

The tandem tudor-like domains have distinct affinities for specific histone marks: they bind preferentially to histone H3 that lacks methylation at arginine 2 (H3R2me0), whereas the adjacent PHD zinc finger recognizes histone H3 bearing the trimethyl mark at lysine 9 (H3K9me3). Together, these tudor-like domains can engage H3K9me3 through an aromatic pocket in the first subdomain, while simultaneously accommodating unmethylated H3K4 (H3K4me0).

The linker region contributes structurally by shaping a binding cavity for histone H3, formed jointly by the tudor-like modules and the PHD finger. It stabilizes this interface through extended contacts with the tandem tudor-like domains.

The SRA domain (also named YDG domain) is specialized for recognizing hemimethylated CpG sites at replication forks. This domain contains a pocket that encloses the flipped-out methylated cytosine, while two loops penetrate the gap left in the duplex from both the major and minor grooves to inspect the remaining three bases of the CpG pair. The loop contacting the major groove establishes CpG specificity and ensures discrimination against methylation occurring on the opposite DNA strand. In addition to 5-methylcytosine, the SRA domain can also bind 5-hydroxymethylcytosine (5hmC).

Finally, the RING finger domain is essential for the protein’s ubiquitin ligase activity.

== Subcellular location ==
UHRF1 is mainly localized in the nucleus, where it associates with chromatin and replication sites, although cytoplasmic localization has been observed in certain cellular and pathological conditions.

== Function ==
UHRF1 acts as an organizational hub within the cell, interacting with a wide range of proteins to assemble regulatory complexes involved in signaling pathways, transcriptional control, and additional cellular activities.

This gene encodes a member of a subfamily of RING-finger type E3 ubiquitin ligases. The encoded protein can bind specific DNA motifs and recruit histone deacetylases, thereby influencing gene expression. The protein binds to hemi-methylated DNA during S-phase and recruits the main DNA methyltransferase protein, DNMT1, to regulate chromatin structure and gene expression. Its expression peaks at late G1 phase and remains elevated through the G2 and M phases of the cell cycle. UHRF1 plays an important role in the G1/S transition, it has been reported to influence the expression of topoisomerase IIα and the retinoblastoma gene. It also functions in the p53-dependent DNA damage checkpoint, contributing to the p53-dependent DNA damage response. Multiple transcript variants encoding different isoforms have been found for this gene. So, UHRF1 originally identified as a direct regulator of topoisomerase 2a, however, more recent research emphasizes its role in epigenetic maintenance and DNA repair, and the direct regulation of topoisomerase IIα by UHRF1 remains debated.

UHRF1 is a multidomain nuclear protein that plays a central role in the maintenance of DNA methylation during replication. It contributes to epigenetic inheritance by recognizing hemimethylated CpG sites through its SRA (SET and RING-associated) domain, allowing the protein to recruit DNA methyltransferase 1 (DNMT1) to newly replicated DNA. In addition to its targeting function, evidence suggests that UHRF1 can enhance DNMT1 activity, with reports indicating an approximate fivefold increase in its catalytic efficiency when both proteins interact directly. This interaction involves the SRA domain of UHRF1 and the replication foci targeting sequence of DNMT1, and does not depend on DNA binding by the SRA domain. Mutations that disrupt this interface markedly reduce DNMT1 stimulation. UHRF1 has also been associated with increased substrate specificity of DNMT1 toward hemimethylated CpG dinucleotides. Through these combined roles: recognition of hemimethylated DNA, recruitment of DNMT1, and enhancement of its catalytic activity and specificity, UHRF1 exerts a multifaceted influence on the fidelity of DNA methylation maintenance.

UHRF1 also contributes to chromatin regulation. Its tudor-like regions and PHD-type zinc finger domains recognize and bind histone H3 carrying the H3K9me3 and H3R2me0 marks, enabling the recruitment of chromatin proteins. The protein is enriched in pericentric heterochromatin, where it helps attract the chromatin modifiers required for heterochromatin replication. It is also detected in euchromatic regions, where it may repress transcription by influencing both DNA methylation and histone modifications.

In addition, UHRF1 possesses E3 ubiquitin-protein ligase activity and can mediate the ubiquitination of target proteins such as histone H3 and PML. However, the relationship between this activity and its chromatin functions in vivo still remains unclear.

UHRF1 is also involved in DNA repair, cooperating with UHRF2 to promote the recruitment and activation of FANCD2 at interstrand cross-links. It also contributes to mitotic spindle organization by mediating Lys-63–linked ubiquitination of KIF11, which regulates KIF11 localization on the spindle.

Some studies suggest that UHRF1 influences glucose and lipid metabolism by modulating the activity of AMPK. Within the nucleus, UHRF1 interacts with the phosphatase PP2A, leading to the dephosphorylation of AMPK at threonine 172, a modification that reduces AMPK activity in both the nuclear and cytoplasmic compartments. UHRF1 also appears to inhibit AMPK-dependent phosphorylation of EZH2 at T311 and histone H2B at S36. Activation of AMPK is known to promote stress-responsive gene expression through phosphorylation of H2B-S36, which helps regulate the activity of the exonuclease Exo1 and prevents excessive fork resection during replication stress. AMPK activation also reduces H3K27 methylation and limits the oncogenic properties of EZH2 by phosphorylating EZH2-T311. Experiments in mouse models have indicated that UHRF1 can influence glucose and lipid homeostasis through its effects on AMPK. Together, these findings point to previously unrecognized roles for UHRF1 in metabolic regulation and in the coordination of multiple epigenetic pathways through its control of AMPK activity.

UHRF1 has been extensively studied in vivo using zebrafish. Indeed, in mammals, UHRF1 is indispensable, as its complete loss results in embryonic lethality. Nevertheless, its absence can still be investigated in systems where maternal deposits of UHRF1 sustain early development, such as zebrafish embryos, or in cultured cells. In these contexts, UHRF1 deficiency has long been associated with global DNA hypomethylation, the accumulation of DNA lesions, and the induction of apoptosis. Both in vivo and in vitro, UHRF1 loss also triggers the reactivation of transposable elements. Reduced DNA methylation together with transposon derepression are well-established drivers of genomic instability and contribute significantly to DNA damage.

== Post-translational modifications for UHRF1 gene ==
Several post-translational modifications regulate the stability and activity of UHRF1.

- Phosphorylation at serine 298 in the linker region decreases UHRF1’s ability to bind histone H3 carrying the H3K9me3 mark.
- Phosphorylation at serine 639 by CDK1 during the M phase disrupts the interaction with USP7, preventing deubiquitination and promoting proteasomal degradation.
- UHRF1 undergoes ubiquitination, which targets the protein for degradation by the proteasome. UHRF1 is capable of self-ubiquitination; binding to USP7 removes ubiquitin chains and stabilizes UHRF1, preventing degradation. During mitosis, phosphorylation at Ser-639 blocks the association with USP7, resulting in increased ubiquitination and subsequent degradation. DNA damage has been reported to enhance polyubiquitination of UHRF1.
- Identified ubiquitination sites include Lys31, Lys50, Lys399, Lys408, Lys500, Lys525, Lys570, Lys600, and Lys692.
- One O-linked glycosylation site has been reported in GlyGen for UHRF1 (Q96T88).

Therefore, the expression levels and biological functions of UHRF1 are controlled not only by transcriptional mechanisms but also by a set of post-translational modifications. Earlier studies have shown that ubiquitination regulates UHRF1 protein stability as well as its biological activities. Moreover, phosphorylation influences UHRF1’s interactions with other proteins and affects various cellular signaling pathways. Acetylation contributes to chromatin remodeling and modulates the interplay between different PTMs occurring on UHRF1. Methylation also affects UHRF1 by altering its protein–protein interactions and its subcellular localization.

Multiple post-translational modifications (PTMs) contribute to the regulation of UHRF1 stability, localization, and activity. Several domains of the protein appear to accommodate specific types of modifications, including the RING, PHD, and tandem Tudor domains, where methylation and acetylation enzymes such as SET7, SET8, PCAF, and p300 have been reported to interact with UHRF1. Other PTMs, including glycosylation, SUMOylation, and lipidation, have also been detected, although their structural and functional implications remain less well characterized. Glycosylation on serine, threonine, or lysine residues may affect UHRF1 turnover and subcellular distribution, while SUMOylation and lipidation have been associated with chromatin remodeling, DNA methylation dynamics, and transcriptional regulation.

The combination and interplay of different PTMs adds another layer of complexity to UHRF1 regulation. Individual modifications such as lysine acetylation have been linked to changes in DNA methylation, whereas phosphorylation of serine residues has been associated with enhanced chromatin binding and protein stability. Methylation on serine, lysine, or arginine residues may further influence how UHRF1 interacts with chromatin or with its protein partners. These observations suggest that the biological properties of UHRF1 are shaped by a coordinated network of PTMs that modulate its role in epigenetic maintenance.

Altered PTM patterns of UHRF1 have been associated with processes relevant to tumor development, including cell proliferation, metastasis, and treatment resistance. Several modifications appear to influence interactions with DNA methyltransferases, histone-modifying enzymes, p53, and cell-cycle regulators, highlighting their relevance in cancer biology. Most of the available data on UHRF1 PTMs have been obtained from in vitro studies, and additional in vivo work may help clarify their physiological and pathological significance.

These regulatory layers highlight the complexity of UHRF1 biology and emphasize its importance as a central coordinator of epigenetic information.

== Clinical significance ==
=== Role in cancer ===
UHRF1 has recently been identified as a novel oncogene in hepatocellular carcinoma, the primary type of liver cancer.

Defects in UHRF1 may be a cause of cancers. Indeed, UHRF1 is overexpressed in several kinds of human cancers, such as bladder, breast, cervical, colorectal and prostate cancers, but also pancreatic adenocarcinomas, rhabdomyosarcomas and gliomas. It contributes to linking histone modifications with gene silencing during cancer development. Elevated UHRF1 expression is observed in multiple cancer types and is associated with poorer patient outcomes, indicating that this protein may play a role in promoting tumor progression.

Indeed, cancer cells typically display distinctive alterations in their DNA methylation landscape, characterized by widespread hypomethylation accompanied by localized regions of hypermethylation. These disruptions are thought to arise, at least in part, from failures in the proper maintenance of DNA methylation. At the same time, many tumors show elevated levels of UHRF1, whose overexpression has been demonstrated to promote oncogenic processes. UHRF1 is also required for colon cancer cells to preserve their methylation patterns and ensure their survival. Together, these findings highlight UHRF1 as a central regulator of the cancer epigenome, underscoring the importance of understanding its functions for both fundamental biology and potential clinical applications.

Research suggests that UHRF1 may contribute to the maintenance of DNA methylation in cancer cells through mechanisms that extend beyond its classical association with DNMT1. Experimental depletion of UHRF1 has been reported to cause a stronger loss of DNA methylation than depletion of DNMT1 alone, an effect that does not appear to result from passive demethylation linked to cell division. Findings from the same study indicate that UHRF1 may enhance the activity of the de novo methyltransferases DNMT3A and DNMT3B while limiting TET2-mediated demethylation. These observations support the hypothesis that UHRF1 acts as a central regulator of the balance between methylation and demethylation in cancer cells, although further research is needed to fully establish the extent and physiological relevance of these non-canonical functions.

=== UHRF1 as a therapeutic target in cancer ===
Research in cancer epigenetics indicates that the abnormal methylation patterns characteristic of tumor cells may offer opportunities for therapeutic intervention. DNA methylation has long been considered a relevant target, and inhibitors of DNMT1, such as 5-aza-cytidine, are already used clinically in disorders like myelodysplastic syndromes and acute myeloid leukemia. However, these drugs present several limitations, including toxicity, instability, and the development of resistance. Recently, more selective DNMT1 inhibitors have been developed and may reduce some of these drawbacks, although they still induce DNMT1 degradation, which could have unintended consequences.

Recent findings suggest that targeting UHRF1 might represent an alternative therapeutic strategy. UHRF1 is frequently overexpressed in tumors, which could potentially offer a therapeutic window in which cancer cells are more vulnerable than healthy tissues. Ongoing efforts in drug discovery are exploring ways to inhibit UHRF1 function, although, as with any essential protein, defining an appropriate dosage or delivery method remains a major challenge. The study proposing this approach highlights possible non-canonical functions of UHRF1 and suggests that further investigation may clarify its relevance as a therapeutic target in both normal physiology and disease.
