= Nubar Ozanyan =

Turkish-Armenian far-left revolutionary

- Born: 1956; Yozgat, Turkey
- Died: 14 August 2017 (aged 61); Raqqa, Syria
- Cause of death: Gunshot wounds
- Burial place: Al-Malikiyah (Derîk), Syria
- Other names: Fermun Çırak (birth name); Orhan Bakırcıyan (nom de guerre)
- Military career
- Allegiance: TKP/ML
- Branch: IFB; TİKKO
- Service years: 1980s–2017
- Rank: TİKKO commander of operations in Rojava
- Conflicts: Maoist insurgency in Turkey; First Intifada; Lebanese Civil War; First Nagorno-Karabakh War; Kurdish–Turkish conflict; Syrian civil war; Battle of Raqqa (2017) †

Nubar Ozanyan (Armenian: Նուպար Օզանեան, born Fermun Çırak; 1956 – 14 August 2017) was a Turkish-born Armenian radical communist revolutionary, who served as a commander in the militant Communist Party of Turkey/Marxist–Leninist (TKP/ML). Fighting in several conflicts for the group, he eventually died in combat against the Islamic State during the Battle of Raqqa.

== Biography ==
Ozanyan's birth name was Fermun Çırak. He later adopted a great number of pseudonyms, of which "Nubar Ozanyan" and "Orhan Bakırcıyan" were the best known.

He was born into a poor ethnic Armenian family in Yozgat, Central Anatolia, in 1956, with his mother dying when he was still young. After receiving primary education, he was introduced to radical leftist ideology and joined the TKP/ML. Following the 1980 Turkish coup d'état, Ozanyan went into exile in France, where he was one of Yılmaz Güney's bodyguards. In the late 1980s, Ozanyan joined TKP/ML's military wing, TİKKO. In 1988 he ventured to Palestine and fought with the Popular Front for the Liberation of Palestine against the Israel Defence Forces during the First Intifada. Ozanyan received military training from local militants in Lebanon's Beqaa Valley in 1990. Between 1991–92, he fought in the First Nagorno-Karabakh War against Azerbaijan. He returned to Turkey's Tunceli Province in 1992 and thereafter participated in the local Maoist insurgency. At this time, Ozanyan began to rise in the ranks of the TKP/ML, and became an important organizer, ideologist, recruiter, trainer and frontline commander for the party.

In 2013, he trained TİKKO fighters in Iraqi Kurdistan. In July 2015, he became one of the commanders of the newly founded International Freedom Battalion (IFB) in Syria, whose aim was to aid the YPG/YPJ against the Islamic State in the Rojava-Islamist conflict. As a member of the IFB, he trained "many Kurdish, Turkish, Armenian, Arab, Palestinian, Greek, Canadian, Sardinian, Belgian and French internationalist fighters." Meanwhile, he attempted to keep the TKP/ML intact and active in Turkey, where the party faced increasing problems as the Turkish Armed Forces intensified their counter-insurgency campaign after the start of the Kurdish–Turkish conflict's third phase. Ozanyan returned to Tunceli Province for some time in late 2016 or early 2017, but eventually resumed his participation in the IFB. By 2017, he was the leading TİKKO commander for operations in Syria.

Ozanyan took part in the Battle for Raqqa, IS's self-proclaimed capital, during which he was killed in combat on 14 August 2017. He was 61. A memorial was held for him by the IFB and YPG/YPJ in Raqqa, and he was buried with full military honors in al-Malikiyah (Derîk) on 28 August. Thousands attended his funeral. His death was lamented by the TKP/ML, the Istanbul-based Armenian Nor Zartonk movement, the THKP-C/MLSPB, the PFLP, the MLPD, and the IRPGF.

== Personal life ==
Ozanyan could read, write and speak Turkish, Armenian and Russian and translated several leftist works into Turkish, including 'Stepan Shahumyan, the Lenin of the Caucasus' and was translating the writings of İbrahim Kaypakkaya into Armenian before his death.

== Legacy ==
On 24 April 2019, a group of Syrian Armenians who were affiliated with TKP/ML and the SDF announced the formation of the Martyr Nubar Ozanyan Brigade.
