= İbrahim Gökçek =

Turkish musician (1980–2020)

- Born: 30 September 1980
- Died: 7 May 2020 (aged 39); Istanbul, Turkey
- Resting place: Kayseri

İbrahim Gökçek (30 September 1980 – 7 May 2020) was a musician of the Turkish revolutionary band Grup Yorum in which he played the bass guitar. He died on 7 May 2020, just two days after ending a 323-day hunger strike.

Gökçek was accused of being a high ranking member of the Revolutionary People's Liberation Party/Front (DHKP-C) and arrested on 1 May 2019 and charged with "establishing and leading an organisation". In Gökçek's trial the testimony of an anonymous so-called secret witness was used. He joined the ongoing hunger strike of other Grup Yorum members in June 2019. The demands of the hunger strikers were that the Turkish government end the suppression of the group, release its members from prison, and allow them to perform at concerts. On 4 January 2020, he and Helin Bölek turned their hunger strike into a death fast. On 14 January 2020 the prosecution demanded a life sentence for Gökçek. In February 2020 he was released from prison, but he stayed on hunger strike together with Bölek in a house in Küçükarmutlu, Istanbul. On 5 May 2020 he ended his hunger strike and was transferred to a hospital for treatment. He died on 7 May 2020.

The following day, mourners taking part in a ceremony in memory of Gökçek at an Alevi cemevi in the neighbourhood of Sultangazi were halted by the police and dispersed with teargas. The police broke down the gates to the cemevi, detained several members of Grup Yorum, and seized the coffin containing Gökçek corpse. He eventually was buried in Kayseri. Members of the ultranationalist Nationalist Movement Party (MHP) took to the streets and have threatened to unearth Ibrahim Gökçek and set his body on fire, as they view him as a terrorist. The protests caused the MHP to close the Grey Wolves offices for a while and dismiss its local chairman.

== Personal life ==
He was married to Sultan Gökçek, who is also a member of Grup Yorum and detained in Silivri Prison.
