= Communist Party of Turkey/Marxist–Leninist =

Communist Party of Turkey/Marxist–Leninist Türkiye Komünist Partisi/Marksist-Leninist
- Leader: İbrahim Kaypakkaya
- General Secretary: 1. İbrahim Kaypakkaya; 2. Süleyman Cihan; 3. Kazım Çelik; 4. Mehmet Demirdağ; 5. Unknown (present)
- Founder: İbrahim Kaypakkaya
- Founded: April 24, 1972; 54 years ago
- Split from: TİİKP
- Newspaper: Communist; Liberation of the Workers and Peasants
- Youth wing: TMLGB
- Armed wing: TİKKO
- Ideology: Communism; Marxism–Leninism–Maoism
- Political position: Far-left
- National affiliation: HBDH (formerly)
- International affiliation: IFB; ICL; RIM （formerly）

Party flag

Website
- www.tkpml6.net

The Communist Party of Turkey/Marxist–Leninist (Turkish:Türkiye Komünist Partisi/Marksist-Leninist , abbreviated as TKP/ML) is a Marxist–Leninist–Maoist insurgent organization in Turkey involved in the Maoist military strategy of people's war against the Turkish government. It was founded in 1972 by a group of former members of the Revolutionary Workers and Peasants Party of Turkey (RWPPT), organised by İbrahim Kaypakkaya as TKP (M-L), who wished to carry out armed struggle.

The TKP/ML participated in the International Conference of Marxist-Leninist Parties and Organizations. It is designated as a terrorist organization by the Turkish state.

== Organisation ==
TİKKO
- Türkiye İşçi Köylü Kurtuluş Ordusu
- Leader: TİKKO General Command (collective leadership tied to Party)
- Active regions: Turkey, Rojava
- Ideology: Communism; Marxism–Leninism-Maoism
- Part of: Communist Party of Turkey/Marxist–Leninist
- Wars: the Political violence in Turkey (1976–80), Maoist insurgency in Turkey, Syrian Civil War

The armed wing of the party is named the Liberation Army of the Workers and Peasants of Turkey (Turkish:Türkiye İşci ve Köylü Kurtuluş Ordusu, abbreviated as TİKKO).

The Marxist-Leninist Youth Union of Turkey (Turkish:Türkiye Marksist Leninist Gençlik Birliği, abbreviated as TMLGB) is the youth organization of TKP/ML. TMLGB, founded in 1972 as an organisation for youth workers, peasants, students and other youths from different production sectors under the Istanbul Province Committee. Mehmet Zeki Şerit (died in 1977 under torture) was the first chair of the TMLGB. TMLGB did not work actively until its first congress in 1987.

== History ==
Following the military memorandum of 1971 the Turkish government cracked down on the communist movement in Turkey. Kaypakkaya and several of his colleagues were arrested. The party machinery was destroyed, while Kaypakkaya died in prison in 1973 as a result of torture.

The Communist Party of Turkey (Marxist–Leninist) re-organized between 1973 and 1978. The first party congress took place in 1978 (TKP (M-L) I. Kongresi in Turkish). In 1981 the second congress was organized (TKP (M-L) II. Kongresi). The party split following the second congress, the splinter group taking up the name TKP/ML (Bolşevik), later Bolshevik Party (North Kurdistan-Turkey).

This was neither the first nor the last split in the party. The Communist Party of Turkey/Marxist–Leninist – Hareketi had already split in (1976) during the re-organisation period. Other splits followed the second congress: Communist Party of Turkey/Marxist-Leninist (Revolutionary Partisan) (1987), Communist Party of Turkey/Marxist-Leninist (Maoist Party Centre) (1987) and Communist Party of Turkey (Marxist-Leninist) (1994).

== Activities ==
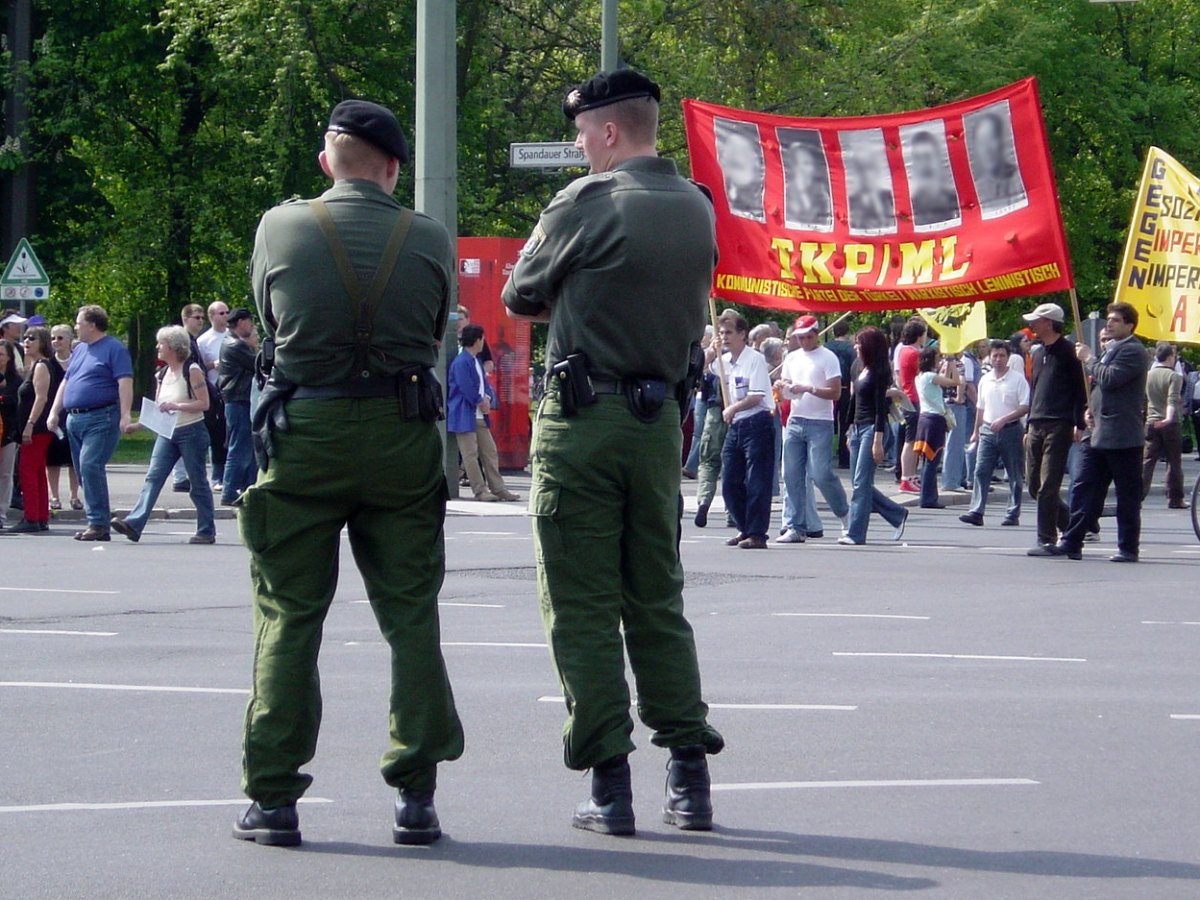
TKP/ML banner during 1 May demonstration in Berlin (2005)

On 17 May 1985, TKP/ML broadcast a propaganda message to millions of television viewers in Istanbul, replacing the soundtrack for the evening news.

On 29 June 2010, two guerillas of the TİKKO were killed in the mountains of Tunceli by the Turkish state forces.

On 2 February 2011, five guerillas of TİKKO in Tunceli died as a result of an avalanche.

On 26 July 2013, the control building of a hydroelectric power plant regulator was bombed in the countryside of Tunceli Province by TİKKO militants.

On 14 March 2014, TİKKO guerrillas attacked a police station in Tunceli. TKP/ML declared that the attack was revenge for death of Berkin Elvan.

In 2016, the organization allegedly kidnapped Erkan Doğan, a civilian, who was later found executed.

== The Rojava revolution and Syrian Civil War ==
In 2014, the organization sent a group of fighters to support the People's Defense Units (YPG) in the Siege of Kobanî and fight against ISIS during the Syrian civil war, since then the group has actively trained and supported the Rojava revolution in the fight against the extremist groups.

TKP/ML-TİKKO were a founding and composite member of the International Freedom Battalion, often working with non-aligned international fighters, such as Lorenzo Orsetti. The well known TİKKO and International Freedom Battalion commander Nubar Ozanyan died in combat in August of 2017 during the Battle of Raqqa at 61 years old. Three years later in 2019, on the anniversary of the Assyrian Genocide, an Assyrian unit within SDF, the Martyr Nubar Ozanyan Brigade, was formed and named in memory of Ozanyan.

On 25 March 2016, the organization's headquarters in Serêkaniyê were targeted by a motorcycle bomb in an attack by ISIS, causing slight injuries to two members and damage to the headquarters.

== Designation as a terrorist organisation ==
The organisation is listed among the 12 active terrorist organisations in Turkey as of 2007, according to the Counter-Terrorism and Operations Department of the Directorate General for Security of the Turkish police.

== Notable members ==
- İbrahim Kaypakkaya
- Barbara Kistler
- Ali Haydar Yıldız
- Nubar Ozanyan

== See also ==
- Maoist insurgency in Turkey
- List of illegal political parties in Turkey
- Communist Party of Turkey (disambiguation), for other groups using similar names
- Confederation of Workers from Turkey in Europe
