= Hilmi Yarayıcı =

- Born: February 5, 1968 (age 57); Antakya, Turkey
- Occupation: Singer

Hilmi Yarayıcı (born 5 February 1969 in Antakya, Turkey) is a Turkish musician best known as the vocalist of Grup Yorum. In 1993, he joined the Istanbul Technical University (ITU) Turkish Music State Conservatory.

== Discography ==
With Grup Yorum

- Cemo / Gün Gelir 1989
- Gel ki Şafaklar Tutuşsun 1990
- Yürek Çağrısı 1991
- Cesaret 1992
- Yıldızlar Kuşandık 2006

Solo albums

- Sürgün
- Sevdadan Yana
- Salkım Söğüt 3
