= Barbara Kistler =

Barbara Anna Kistler
- Born: 21 November 1955; Zürich, Switzerland
- Died: January 1993 (aged 37); Tunceli Province, Turkey
- Occupations: politician, guerrilla
- Known for: Far-left activism
- Political party: Communist Party of Turkey/Marxist–Leninist
- Movement: Workers' and Peasants' Liberation Army of Turkey

Barbara Anna Kistler (21 November 1955 – January 1993) was a Swiss Maoist revolutionary, TKP/ML activist and member of the Workers' and Peasants' Liberation Army of Turkey.

== Biography ==
Kistler was born in Zürich, Switzerland. She was a member of the Group Against Isolation (KGI), which was seeking to build a Communist Party in Switzerland. In 1980, she met communists from Turkey who had fled to Switzerland to escape the military coup. In 1986 Barbara Kistler came into contact with sympathizers of the TKP/ML. On 19 May 1991, she was arrested in Istanbul together with her collaborators. She was held incommunicado for 10 days Kistler was released on September 16 and returned to Switzerland. Then she went back to Turkey. She decided to go to the mountains of Turkey to join the armed struggle of the Workers' and Peasants' Liberation Army of Turkey. She was killed during clashes with the Turkish Armed Forces in Tunceli Province, in 1993.

== See also ==
- Andrea Wolf
