= People's Front (Turkey) =

Turkish Marxist-Leninist organization

Halk Cephesi
- Type: Far-left political movement
- Purpose: social activism
- Headquarters: Istanbul
- Location: Turkey
- Main organ: Halk Okulu

People's Front (Turkish: Halk Cephesi) is a Marxist-Leninist mass organization in the Republic of Turkey.

== Organization ==
- Youth organization - Revolutionary Youth (Turkish: Devrimci Gençlik)
- Trade union - Revolutionary Workers Movement (Turkish: Devrimci İşçi Hareketi)
- Lawyers organization - People's Law Office (Turkish: Halkın Hukuk Bürosu)
- Engineers organization - Engineer Architects of the People (Turkish: Halkın Mühendis ve Mimarları)
- Prisoner support organization - TAYAD

== Activity ==
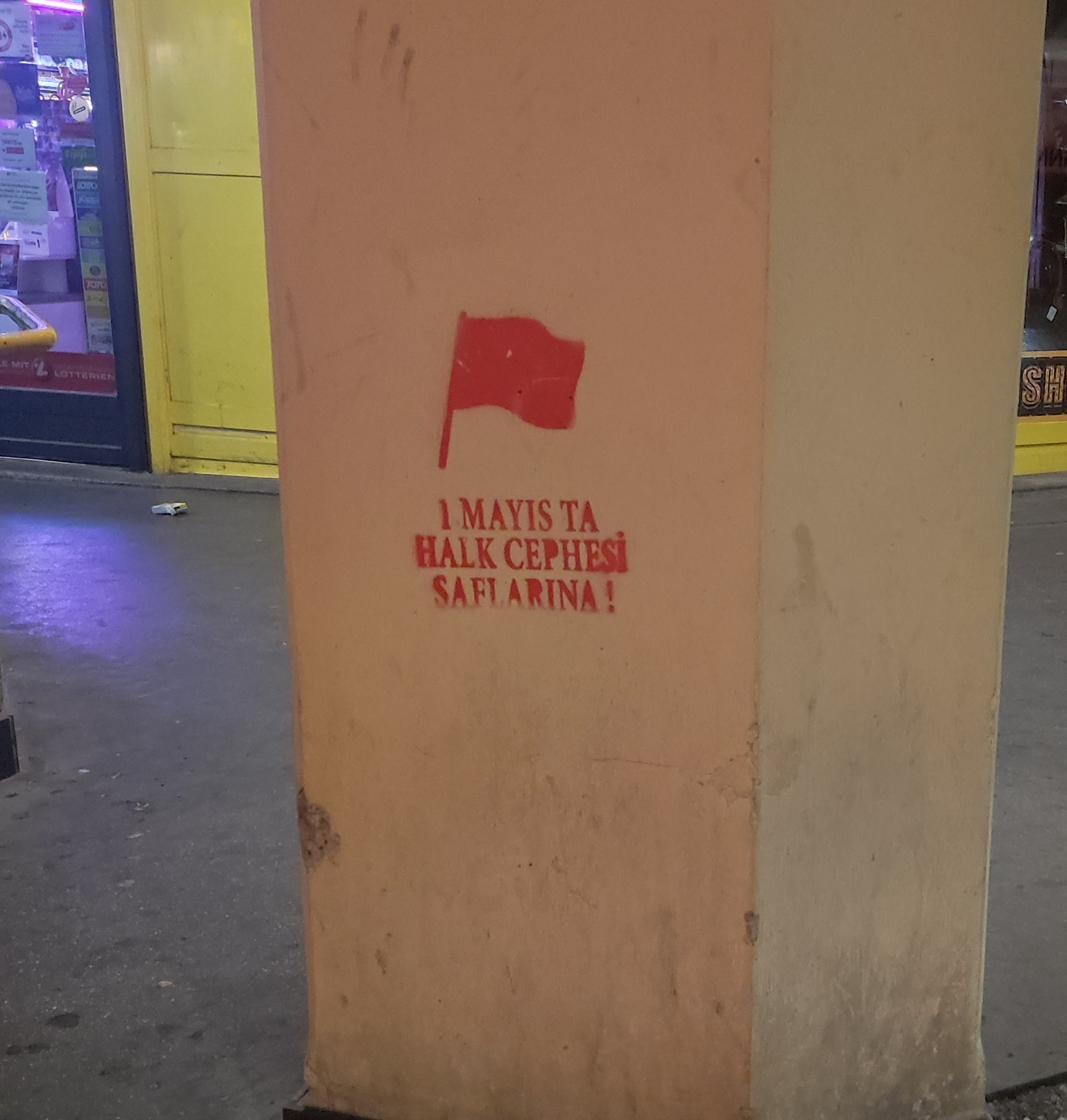
Graffiti celebrating the People's Front in Vienna, Austria

Halk Cephesi works on issues such as solving social problems such as drug addiction, prostitution, gentrification. Halk Cephesi is active mostly in poor neighborhoods in Istanbul where it also has associations named "Hasan Ferit Gedik Center for Struggle and Liberation Against Drugs" which acts as a rehabilitation centre for those addicted to drugs.

=== Events ===
On 29 September 2013 Hasan Ferit Gedik, young activist of Halk Cephesi was killed by drug gang in Maltepe. Members of People's Front opened clinic the Hasan Ferit Gedik Center for Struggle and Liberation from Drugs

On 28–29 October 2020, close to 100 people from Halk Cephesi were arrested in raids across 12 provinces in Turkey

== International relations ==
People's Front is one of founder-members of the Anti-Imperialist Front, and organised yearly International Symposium against Imperialist Aggression. in Istanbul.

== See also ==
- Grup Yorum
- Popular front
