= Bandista =

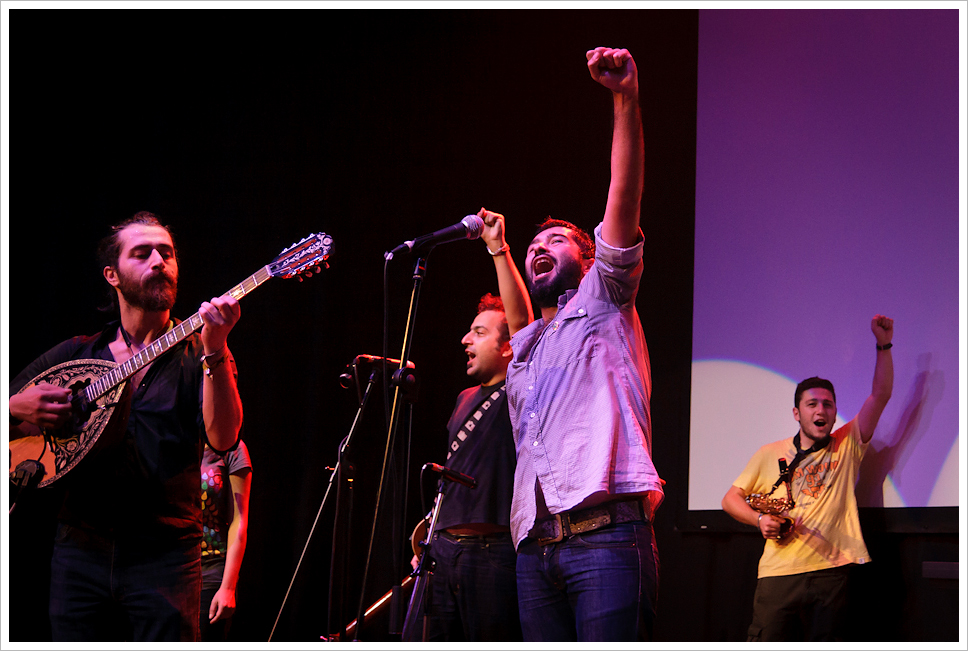
- Bandista in 2006

Background information
- Origin: Istanbul, Turkey
- Genres: Protest, ska, dub, world fusion
- Years active: 2006–present
- Website: bandista.org

Bandista (also stylized as bANDİSTA) is a Turkish musical collective, formed in 2006 in Istanbul. The band is known for their diverse musical style, DIY ethic and leftist political stance.

Bandista takes its name from the abbreviation of "Bando Istanbul". The band releases their albums independently for free. Their first release, De Te Fabula Narratur, was mastered in Italy and 1000 copies distributed for free at Taksim Square. The band's 2012 EP and the latest release, Sınırsız-Ulussuz-Sürgünsüz was dedicated to Festus Okey, a Nigerian immigrant who was a victim of police brutality in Turkey.

The collective members play various musical instruments for their records, including accordion, bass guitar, clarinet, saxophone, snare drum, fiddle, bouzouki, keyboards, trombone, and melodica. The collective also includes non-musician members. The members do not disclose their identities and prefer to stay anonymous.

The collective has performed at various festivals and demonstrations. The collective is also a supporter of the Occupy Gezi movement.

== Discography ==
Studio albums

- Buhal (2018)
- Ki buradayız hâlâ (2014)
- Bandsista | Sokak Meydan Gece (2012)
- Daima! (2011)
- Dikkat Askersiz Bölge (2010)
- Şu anda! Şimdi! (2010)
- Paşanın Başucu Şarkıları (2009)
- De Te Fabula Narratur (2009)

EPs

- Gün Bizim Devir (2015)
- Sınırsız-Ulussuz-Sürgünsüz (2012)

== See also ==
- Grup Yorum
- Grup Munzur
- Komik Günler
