= Confederation of Workers from Turkey in Europe =

European migrant worker organization

ATİK
- Confederation of Workers from Turkey in Europe
- Avrupa Türkiye'li İşçiler Konfederasyonu
- Founded: 1986
- Headquarters: The Hague, Netherlands
- Key people: Yılmaz Güneş, president
- Website: www.atik-online.net

Confederation of Workers from Turkey in Europe, (Turkish: Avrupa Türkiye'li İşçiler Konfederasyonu or ATİK) is European migrant worker organization.

== History ==
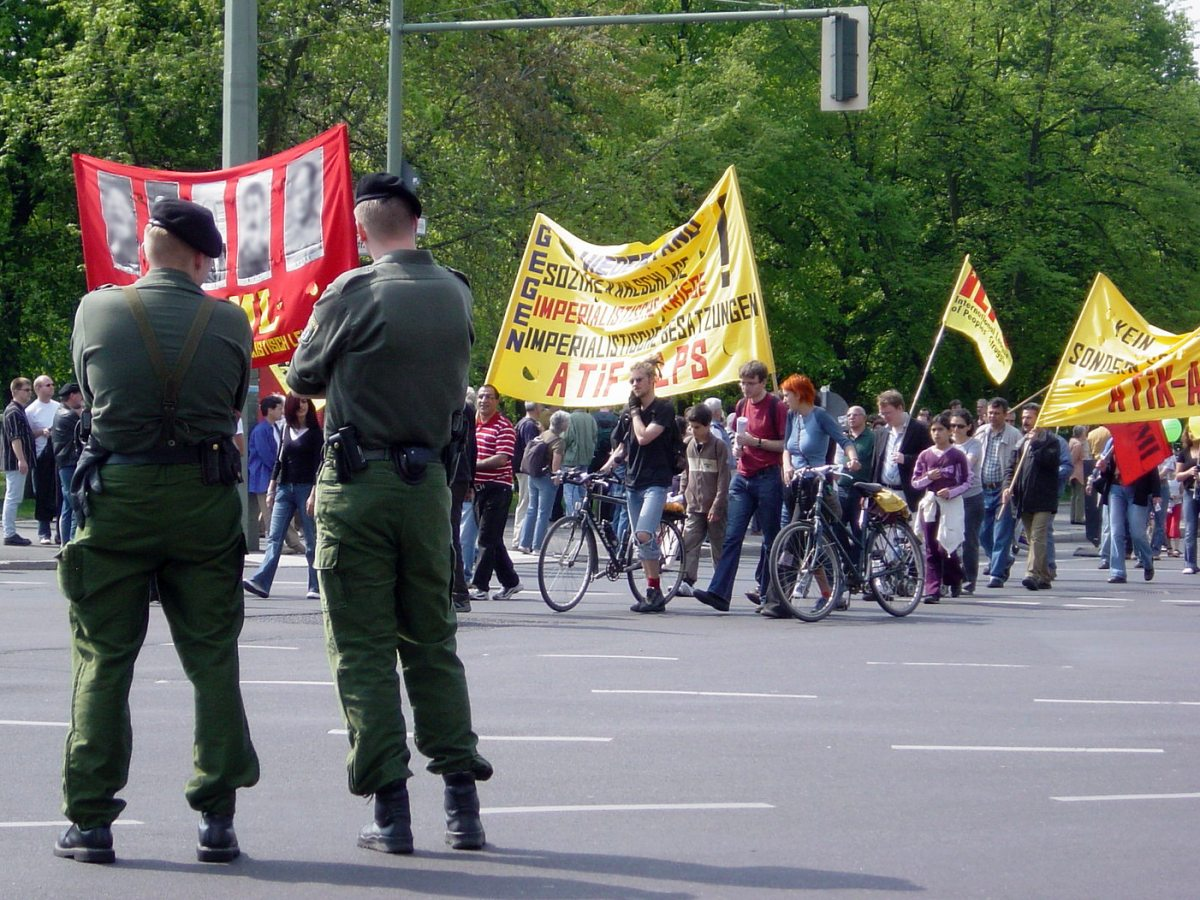
TKP/ML, ATİK and ATIF in Berlin (2005)

ATİK was founded in 1986. The first section was founded in Germany under the name of ATIF.

=== Repressions ===
On 15 April 2015 in Germany, Greece, France and Switzerland ATIK activists have been arrested and accused of membership in the TKP/ML - illegal revolutionary organization.

== Organization ==
Yılmaz Güneş is leader of ATİK since 2011.

New Democratic Youth (Turkish: Yeni Demokratik Gençlik or YDG) is the youth organization of ATİK.

New Women (Turkish: Yeni Kadın) - is women's right organization related to ATİK.

== Regional sections ==
- The Federation of Workers from Turkey in Germany (Turkish: Almanya Türkiyeli İşçiler Federasyonu or ATIF)
- The Federation of Workers and Youth from Turkey in Austria (Turkish: Avusturya Türkiyeli İşçi Gençlik Federasyonu or ATIGF)
- The Federation of Workers from Turkey in Holland (Turkish: Hollanda Türkiyeli İşçiler Federasyonu or HTIF)
- The Federation of Workers from Turkey in Switzerland (Turkish: İsviçre Türkiyeli İşçiler Federasyonu or ITIF)
- France Committee (Turkish: Fransa Komitesi)
- England Committee (Turkish: İngiltere Komitesi)
- Greece Committee (Turkish: Yunanistan Komitesi)

== See also ==
- Turkish diaspora
- Turks in Germany
- Migrant worker
- Immigration law
- Maoist insurgency in Turkey
