= Ali Haydar Yıldız =

Kurdish revolutionary

- Born: 1953; Erturan, Palu, Elazığ, Turkey
- Died: 24 January 1973 (aged 19–20); Vartinik, Çemişgezek, Tunceli, Turkey
- Political party: Communist Party of Turkey/Marxist–Leninist (1972–1973)

Ali Haydar Yıldız (1953 – 24 January 1973) was a Kurdish political activist and a founding member of the far-left Communist Party of Turkey/Marxist–Leninist (TKP/ML-TİKKO) insurgent organization in Turkey in 1972. Yıldız was shot and killed in a shoot-out with Turkish soldiers in 1973.

== Biography ==
Ali Haydar Yıldız was born in 1953 in the village of Erturan in Palu, Elazığ to a Kurdish Alevi family. After finishing high school in Elazığ in 1970, he moved to Istanbul where he became influenced by people involved in the protests of 1968 and would join them in their activities. In 1970, he was arrested by Turkish authorities and tortured for 48 hours in his month-long detention. His time in prison formed his view on the Kurdish question. After being released, he met İbrahim Kaypakkaya and they founded the TKP/ML-TİKKO in 1972.

=== Death ===
On 24 January 1973, Yıldız, Kaypakkaya and other members of TKP/ML-TİKKO lived in the village of Vartinik in Tunceli Province. When Turkish soldiers approached them, they attempted to flee but were hit by bullets and pretended to be dead. While the others were able to flee, Yıldız was left behind and died from his wounds. Kaypakkaya later died of his wounds as well.
