= Tuncay Akdoğan =

Turkish singer

- Born: 1959; Adana, Turkey
- Died: 21 November 2004 (aged 44–45) Istanbul, Turkey
- Genres: Protest, folk
- Occupations: Singer, musician
- Instruments: Bağlama, cura, drums
- Years active: 1984–2004

Tuncay Akdoğan (1959 – 21 November 2004) was a Turkish musician and record producer. He was a founding member of Grup Yorum and Grup Kızılırmak.

== Life and career ==
Tuncay Akdoğan was born in 1959 in Adana. He graduated from Marmara University Press and Broadcasting School. Akdoğan, who began making music during his time as a university student, founded Grup Yorum together with Kemal Sahir Gürel, Metin Kahraman and Ayşegül Yordam in 1985.

In 1989, Akdoğan and İlkay Akkaya left Grup Yorum, and in 1990 together with İlkay Akkaya and İsmail İlknur he founded Grup Kızılırmak.

In 1998, he left Grup Kızılırmak, and two years later founded Grup Serüvenciler with Serdar Şengül, Fırat Başkal, Uğurcan Sezen, Gürsoy Tanç and Remzi Çoban. The band released one album together, Veda, after which it was dissolved.

On 21 November 2004, Akdoğan, who lighted a candle because of the electricity cut off in his house where he lived alone, died at the age of 45 in the fire that broke out in his house as a result of the candle falling on the floor. His body was buried in Kilyos Cemetery after the funeral ceremony held at Okmeydanı Cemevi on 24 November 2004.

Akdoğan had been working on his solo album Bir Nehir ki Ömrüm for a long time in his studio before his death. The album was later completed by his friends and released under the label Seyhan Müzik.
