= Martyr Nubar Ozanyan Brigade =

Military unit

- Armenian: Նահատակ Նուպար Օզանեան Գումարտակ; Arabic: طابور الشهيد نوبار اوزانيان
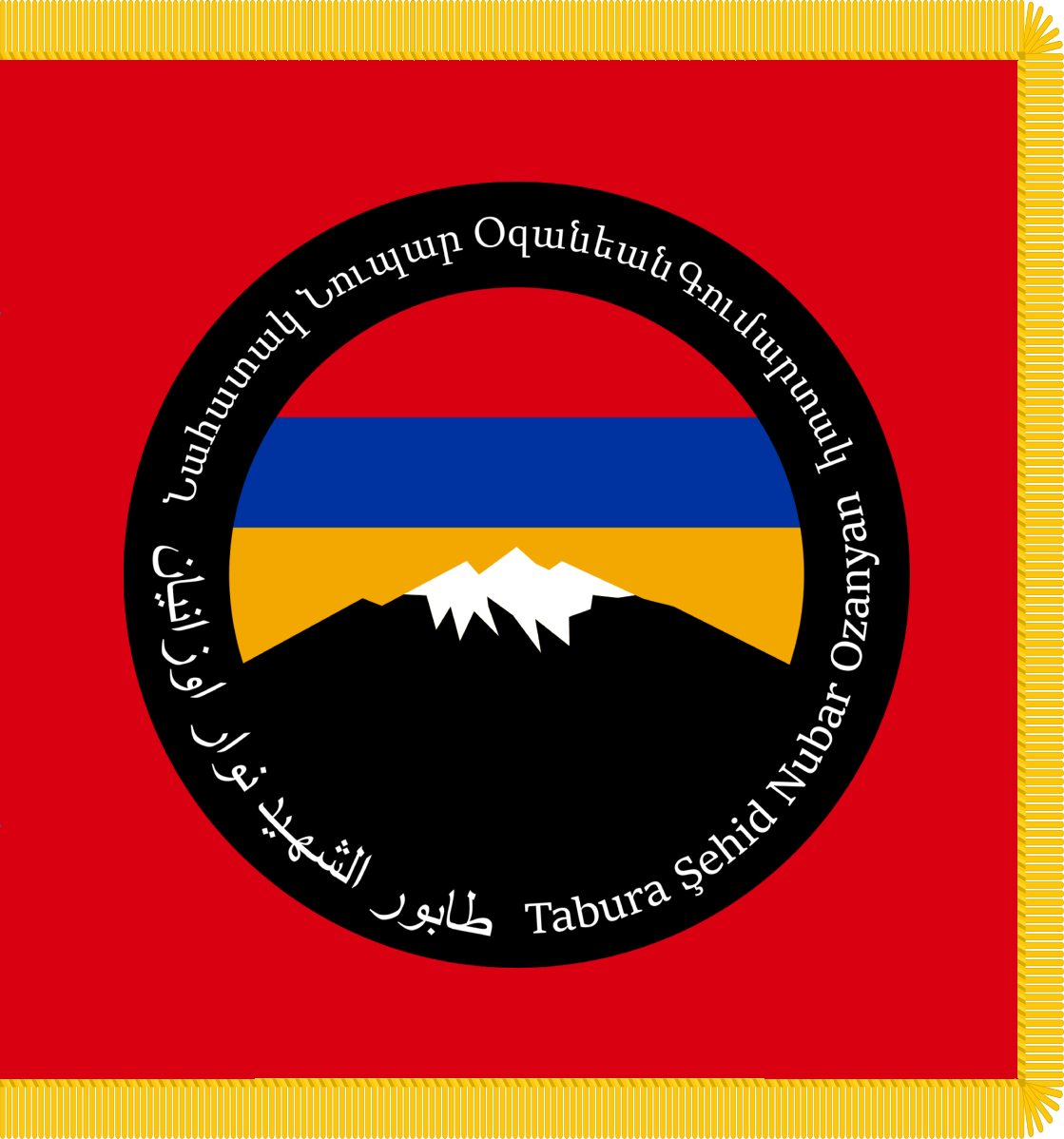
- Logo of the Martyr Nubar Ozanyan Brigade
- Leader: Masis Mutanyan
- Dates active: 2019 – present
- Ideology: Armenian minority interests Anti-imperialism; Marxism-Leninism-Maoism
- Part of: Syrian Democratic Forces Communist Party of Turkey/Marxist–Leninist
- Wars: the Syrian Civil War

The Martyr Nubar Ozanyan Brigade (Armenian: Նահատակ Նուպար Օզանեան Գումարտակ, Arabic: طابور الشهيد نوبار اوزانيان, romanized: Tābūr Al-Shāhīd Nūbar Awzānyan, Kurdish: Tabura Şehid Nubar Ozanyan) is an Armenian military unit in Syria and a part of the Liberation Army of the Workers and Peasants of Turkey (TİKKO), and the Syrian Democratic Forces. The brigade was founded in the Marziya Church in the Assyrian village of Tell Goran on 24 April 2019, the 104th anniversary of the Armenian genocide.

The brigade is named after Nubar Ozanyan, a Turkish-born Armenian Marxist-Leninist-Maoist revolutionary, who was commander of TİKKO, the armed wing of the Communist Party of Turkey/Marxist-Leninist (TKP-ML), in Syria during the 2017 battle of Raqqa, in which he was killed in action.

The brigade stated that its goals are to defend the Armenians of Syria, the language, and culture, and all peoples of the Autonomous Administration of North and East Syria from the Islamic State of Iraq and the Levant (ISIL) and the Turkish state, which it described as the "current representatives of the fascist Union and Progress Committee".

On 14 August 2019 the Martyr Nubar Ozanyan Brigade and the TKP-ML held a joint ceremony in the Hasakah region of Rojava commemorating the second anniversary of Ozanyan's death during the battle of Raqqa, attended by representatives from multiple Syrian Democratic Forces and other Turkish communist groups of the International Freedom Battalion.

== Flags in Use ==
The flag of the Martyr Nubar Ozanyan Brigade (Western Armenian: Նահատակ Նուպար Օզանեան Գումարտակ) was adopted on the 24th of April, 2019 by the brigade. The flag is a white base background with the group's emblem in the center., the unit flag is a square plain red banner, with the emblem in the center, although the ring has been changed from a white to black, and the text is in white.

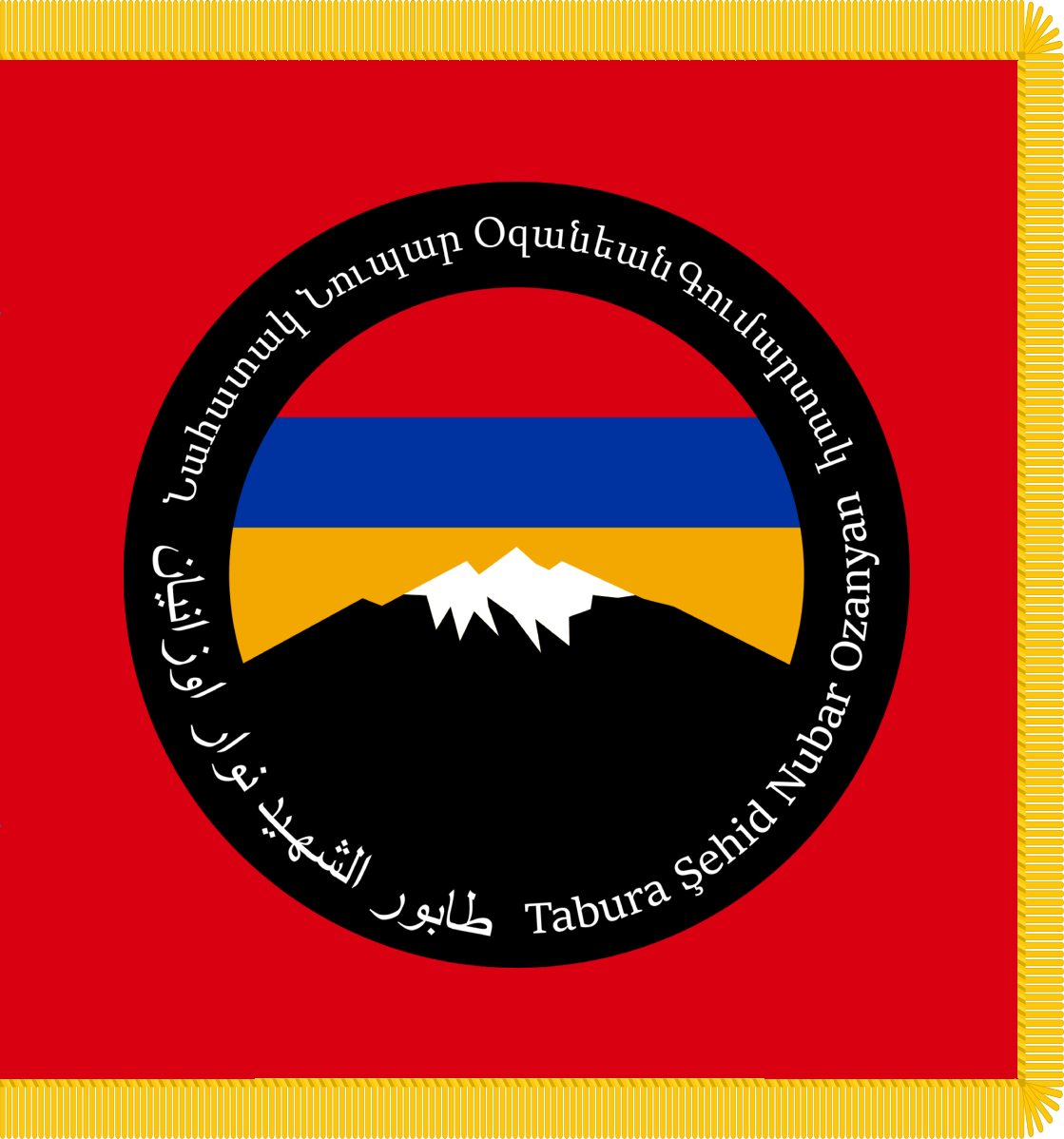
Unit Parade Banner

== See all ==
- Christian militias in Iraq and Syria
- TKP/ML
- Armenians in Syria
- Armenian Secret Army for the Liberation of Armenia
