= Grup Yorum =

Turkish band

- Origin: Istanbul, Turkey
- Genres: Folk rock, folk, protest music, left, political music, türkü
- Years active: 1985–present
- Labels: Kalan, Cem Müzik Yapım
- Members: Selma Altın, İnan Altın, Bahar Kurt, Ali Aracı, Barış Yüksel, Betül Varan, Bergün Varan, İhsan Cibelik, Sena Erkoc,
- Past members: Metin Kahraman, Kemal Sahir Gürel, Hilmi Yarayıcı, İlkay Akkaya, Efkan Şeşen, özcan şenver, Ufuk Lüker, Helin Bölek, Ibrahim Gökçek,
- Website: grupyorum.com

Grup Yorum is a band from Turkey known for their political songwriting. Grup Yorum (yorum means 'rendition' of a piece of art or music, 'interpretation' or 'commentary' in Turkish) has released twenty-three albums and one film since 1985. Some of the group's concerts and albums have been banned over the years, and some of the group members have been arrested, jailed, and tortured, while 2 members of the group died of hunger strike over the Turkish state's treatment. Yorum remains popular and their albums continue to sell well in Turkey and internationally. Yorum has also given concerts in Germany, Austria, Australia, France, Italy, the Netherlands, Belgium, Denmark, United Kingdom, Greece and Syria.

The group publishes an art, culture, literature, and music magazine entitled Tavir, and several group members manage a cultural center in the Okmeydanı neighborhood of Istanbul called İdil Kültür Merkezi.

== History ==
In 1985, four friends at Marmara University formed Grup Yorum. Influenced by the Latin American Nueva canción movement, they combined Turkish and Kurdish folk music and topical song with a left-wing, often satirical, perspective. In 1987, their first album Siyrilip Gelen was released. While the government frequently asserts that the group is tied to the DHKP-C, and it is not uncommon for the audience at their concerts to chant DHKP-C slogans, Grup Yorum is not formally affiliated with any other organization and its fans represent a broad range of Turkish and Kurdish left-wing orientations.

They have sung about capitalism, imperialism, anti-Americanism, and the Turkish government's policies, which they say penalize the poor. One track is about the clearing of poor neighborhoods to make way for expensive skyscrapers. Grup Yorum was also the first band in Turkey to have a Kurdish song on an album. In 1993, a lorry containing their album Cesaret was on the way to Diyarbakır when it was stopped by Turkish Gendarmerie and the boxes containing the albums were shot at with live ammunition.

The group's composition has been in a constant state of change since its inception, and its members have continuously experienced political oppression, including over 400 arrests and trials (approximately 400). Their albums have been seized by police and their concerts banned, but despite this Grup Yorum has been one of the top-selling groups in the history of Turkey. The band gave their 25th anniversary concert on 12 June 2010 in İnönü Stadium, home to sports club Beşiktaş J.K. The concert was attended by 55,000 fans. Starting in 2011, Grup Yorum began an annual series of free concerts entitled Tam Bağımsız Türkiye, the first two of which attracted 150,000 and 250,000 fans respectively.

Towards the end of 2017, they released the album İlle Kavga (meaning 'struggle no matter what') and their album cover shows instruments that were destroyed by police during a raid in 2016 on their cultural centre.

=== Films ===
==== F-Type ====
Whilst the group is mostly known for the songs it creates, in 2012 they also produced a film called F-Tipi (F-Type). F-Tipi is a film about the experiences of political prisoners in F-Type prisons following the simultaneous "Return to Life Operation" in 19 prisons on 19 December 2000. The film was developed by Grup Yorum and directed by 10 directors (Hüseyin Karabey, Ezel Akay, Reis Çelik, Aydın Bulut, Barış Pirhasan, Mehmet İlker Altınay, Sırrı Süreyya Önder, Vedat Özdemir). The film premiered on 19 December 2012 at Atlas Cinema, Istanbul, and on 21 December 2012 it entered cinemas in Turkey. The film, which was released for 14 weeks, was viewed by 75,643 people. One of the film's directors, Ezel Akay, said that the film had been subjected to censorship by the Istanbul Metropolitan Municipality even before it was released. Despite payment being made, film posters were not hung in the subway by the municipality, wall posters were removed, and people who were putting up the posters were detained. The film screening in Samsun was cancelled following the threatening of the cinema owners by police and supporters of the Nationalist Movement Party (MHP). The film was shown in many countries including the United Kingdom, Germany, and France.

==== Mahalle (The Neighborhood) ====
In a 2018 press statement, exiled Grup Yorum member İnan Altın said that a new film was in the process of being developed. He added that the police had raided the location of the filming, and that it was becoming impossible to create the film in Turkey. In October 2021 in a Twitter video, the group announced that the film was complete and going to be released shortly.

The film named The Neighborhood was released on 20 May 2022 in cinemas across Europe, such as in the United Kingdom, France, Germany, and Switzerland. The world premiere took place in Europe's largest cinema, Grand Rex, with close to 2000 people on 16 May. It tells the true story of the struggle against gentrification and drug gangs in the neighbourhood of Küçük Armutlu in Istanbul and contains real footage of police raiding and banning the film.

=== Treatment by the state ===
On 18 January 2013, five members of the group were accused of DHKP-C membership and arrested. They were released three days later.

In October 2016 the Turkish police raided the İdil Cultural Center and destroyed music instruments belonging to the band. Later the band published a video in which they played a song on their broken instruments. In November 2016, eight members of Grup Yorum were arrested at a concert they gave. They were released the following spring.

In February 2018, Ali Aracı, İbrahim Gökçek, Selma Altın, İnan Altın, Emel Yeşilırma, and İhsan Cibelik were placed on the wanted list of the Turkish government. These members were put on the grey list, which meant a 300,000 Turkish lira bounty on their heads. Selma and İnan Altın left Turkey and applied for asylum in France in July 2018. İbrahim Gökçek was detained on 26 February 2019 and sent to Silivri Prison on 1 March 2019.

In just two years the İdil Cultural Center was raided 10 times and several members of the band were arrested. On 22 January 2019 Sultan Gökçek and Betül Varan were released, while the members Seher Adıgüzel, Ferhat Kıl, Helin Bölek, Dilan Ekin, Bahar Kurt, Özgür Gültekin, Meral Hır and Duygu Yasinoğlu stayed in custody. In February 2019, İbrahim Gökçek was again arrested and accused of being a member of DHKP-C.

In November 2019, Cologne police raided a venue and banned a Grup Yorum concert which was due to take place in solidarity with members in Turkey. The police statement said that the concert was forbidden, and that the venue where the concert would be held would be closed by the police.

On Wednesday 5 August, 6 Grup Yorum members were arrested during a concert rehearsal at Beykoz, and at the same time the Idil Cultural Centre was raided. The 6 Grup Yorum members were released a few hours later.

As of 20 November 2020, Grup Yorum has announced on its Twitter account that 3 Grup Yorum members and 5 choir members are jailed.

==== Hunger strike ====
In May 2019, several members of the Grup Yorum began a hunger strike in protest to the treatment the band received from the Turkish government. Their demands included that the Turkish government end forbidding its free concerts and release band members from prison. İbrahim Gökçek and Helin Bölek joined the hunger strike in June 2019. Bölek and Bahar Kurt were released in November 2019, but they kept on fasting. On 4 January Gökçek and Bölek turned their hunger strike into a death fast. Subsequently, Gökçek was released on 25 February 2020 but also kept on fasting. On 11 March 2020, Bölek and Gökçek's house was raided by the police and were taken to hospital to receive treatment, but as they announced opposition to the treatment, they were released again. In April 2020, Helin Bölek died after 288 days of hunger strike in a house in Istanbul's Küçükarmutlu where she had been staging the hunger strike with Gökçek against the treatment of the band by the Turkish government. On 5 May 2020, Gökçek ended his hunger-strike and was transferred to a hospital in Istanbul for treatment. He died on 7 May 2020. On the following day the funeral was stopped by the police in the Istanbul neighbourhood of Sultangazi. The police seized his coffin and brought his corpse to Kayseri, where he was buried.

==== İzmir mosque controversy ====
On 21 May 2020, instead of the adhan, Grup Yorum's version of the well-known resistance song "Bella Ciao" was aired from a number of minarets in İzmir. Turkish authorities arrested a woman that same day for the act, which they called an attack on mosques and religion.

== Members ==
=== Current members ===
- Vocals : Selma Altın, Eren Olcay, Sultan Gökçek, Umut Gültekin, Ayfer Rüzgar, Betül Varan, Fırat Kıl, Sena Erkoç
- Bağlama : İhsan Cibelik, Meral Hır, Emel Yeşilırmak
- Classic/acoustic guitar : Muharrem Cengiz, Dilan Ekin, Ekimcan Yıldırım
- Keyboard instruments : İnan Altın
- Wind instruments : Ali Aracı, Selma Altın, İhsan Cibelik, Bahar Kurt, Dilan Poyraz, Betül Varan, Sena Erkoç
- Bass guitar : Seher Adılgüzel
- Percussion instruments : İnan Altın, Bergün Varan, Barış Yüksel
- Choral vocals: Emel Yeşilırmak

=== Past members ===
- Vocals : Ayşegül Yordam(*), Efkan Şeşen, Hilmi Yarayıcı, İlkay Akkaya, Fikriye Kılınç, Özcan Şenver, Gülbahar Uluer, Selma Çiçek, Nuray Erdem, Mesut Eröksüz, Beril Güzel, Aylin Şeşen, Taner Tanrıverdi, Özgür Tekin, Öznur Turan, Aynur Dogan, Ezgi Dilan Balcı, Helin Bölek
- Bağlama : Tuncay Akdoğan(*), Metin Kahraman(*), İrşad Aydın, Suat Kaya, Ufuk Lüker, Taner Tanrıverdi, Seckin Taygun Aydogan, Cihan Keşkek, Özgür Zafer Gültekin
- Classic/acoustic guitar : Kemal Sahir Gürel(*), Elif Sumru Göker, Hakan Alak, Serdar Güven, Serdar Keskin, Ufuk Lüker, Vefa Saygın Öğütle, Erkan Sevil, Caner Bozkurt
- Keyboard instruments : Kemal Sahir Gürel, Ufuk Lüker, Taci Uslu, Ali Papur
- Wind instruments : Kemal Sahir Gürel
- Bass guitar : Ejder Akdeniz, Hakan Alak, Ufuk Lüker, İbrahim Gökçek
- Percussion instruments : Kemal Sahir Gürel, Ejder Akdeniz

(*) indicates a founding member.

== Discography ==
=== Studio albums ===
- Sıyrılıp Gelen (1987)
- Haziranda Ölmek Zor / Berivan (1991)
- Türkülerle (1992)
- Cesaret (1993)
- Gel ki Şafaklar Tutuşsun (1993)
- Hiç Durmadan (1993)
- Cemo / Gün Gelir (1994)
- İleri (1994)
- Geliyoruz (1996)
- Yürek Çağrısı (1998)
- Destan (1998)
- Yürüyüş (2003)
- Feda (2005)
- Yıldızlar Kuşandık (2006)
- Başeğmeden (2008)
- Halkın Elleri (2013)
- Ruhi Su (2015)
- İlle Kavga (2017)
- Zafer Halayı (2025)

=== Singles and EPs ===
- Eylül (2001)
- Biz Varız (2003)

=== Compilations ===
- Marşlarımız (1997)
- Kucaklaşma (1998)
- Seçmeler 15. Yıl (2000)

== Songs ==
- Dersim'de Doğan Güneş

== See also ==
- Grup Munzur
- Bandista
- Halk Cephesi
