= Revolutionary Workers' and Peasants' Party of Turkey =

Revolutionary Workers and Peasants Party of Turkey Türkiye İhtilalci İşçi Köylü Partisi
- Abbreviation: TİİKP
- Leader: Doğu Perinçek
- Founded: May 21, 1969.
- Dissolved: September 1977
- Split from: DEV-GENÇ
- Preceded by: TİÇSF (de jure)
- Succeeded by: TİKP
- Ideology: Communism; Marxism–Leninism; Mao Zedong Thought; Anti-revisionism
- Political position: Far-left

Revolutionary Workers' and Peasants' Party of Turkey (Turkish: Türkiye İhtilâlci İşçi Köylü Partisi, TİİKP) was a Marxist–Leninist communist party in Turkey. TİİKP was founded in 1969 by the Proleter Devrimci Aydınlık ("Proletarian Revolutionary Enlightenment") group that had broken away from DEV-GENÇ ("Revolutionary Youth"). The chairman of TİİKP was Doğu Perinçek. TİİKP was an illegal party.

The central publications of the party were Proleter Devrimci Aydınlık and Şafak ("Dawn").

In 1972, İbrahim Kaypakkaya and others broke with TİİKP and formed Türkiye Komünist Partisi/Marksist-Leninist ("Communist Party of Turkey (Marxist-Leninist)").

In 1978, TİİKP was succeeded by Türkiye İşçi Köylü Partisi ("Workers' and Peasants' Party of Turkey" or TİKP). TİKP later became a legal party and became Sosyalist Parti ("Socialist Party" or SP). In 1992, İşçi Partisi ("Workers' Party" or İP) was formed as a continuation of TİKP and SP. In 2015 Workers' Party changed its name to Patriotic Party.

== See also ==
- List of illegal political parties in Turkey
- List of anti-revisionist groups
