= Seyfi Dursunoğlu =

Turkish showman (1932–2020)

- Born: Seyfettin Dursun; 1 October 1932; Trabzon, Turkey
- Died: 17 July 2020 (aged 87); Istanbul, Turkey
- Burial place: Zincirlikuyu Cemetery
- Education: Haydarpaşa High School; Istanbul University (left)
- Occupation(s): Actor and drag queen
- Years active: 1970–2020
- Television: Huysuz Show; Huysuz ve Tatlı Kadın

Seyfi Dursunoğlu (born Seyfettin Dursun; 1 October 1932 – 17 July 2020), also known by his stage name Huysuz Virjin (Grumpy Virgin), was a Turkish actor and drag queen. From the 1970s until the 2010s, he was a well-known entertainment figure with his programs in Turkey's television.

== Life and career ==
Dursunoğlu was born in 1932 in Trabzon. After finishing his education at Haydarpaşa High School, he studied philology at Istanbul University but left the university to work as a civil servant at the Social Insurance Institution (SSK). After working for 18 years as a public officer in the SSK, he left his job and started to perform under the name Huysuz Virjin as a drag artist in 1970.

He started his career at small clubs, but as his reputation spread out, he started to get offers from bigger clubs. Every year at the İzmir International Fair, he shared the stage with renowned soloists in Turkey. With thousands of people coming to İzmir International Fair, he did not initially appear on television but managed to gain fame in Turkey. Dursunoğlu made his biggest debut with the character of "Huysuz Virjin" by participating in the contest program of Öztürk Serengil on TRT. His humorous responses as Huysuz Virjin to Öztürk Serengil's on the program made him a much discussed figure in the public. With the character of Huysuz Virjin, Dursunoğlu became able to express his opinions more freely. He started to state facts in a humorous way.

In the 1970s, he released a new record titled Huysuz Virjin 1.

In 2007, Radio and Television Supreme Council (RTÜK) announced that his program could no longer be broadcast on television channels and that he would no longer revive the character of Huysuz Virjin but he presented the dance program Huysuz'la Dans Eder misin? on Show TV in 2012. In the same year, he joined Benzemez Kimse Sana as a judge which aired on Star TV. On the program's final episode, he appeared as Huysuz Virjin and said "This is my last kanto", implying that he could not sing kanto again due to his age. He later announced that he would donate ₺15 million of his property to the Association for the Support of Contemporary Living.

== Death ==
He died on 17 July 2020 at Istanbul Acıbadem Altunizade Hospital due to complications from pneumonia brought by COPD.

== Filmography ==
Television

- Gülünüz Güldürünüz (1976)
- Huysuz ve Tatlı Kadın (1997–1998)
- Huysuz Şimdi Hostes (1998)
- Huysuz Show (1998)
- Tatlı ve Huysuz Show (2002)
- Turkstar (2004)
- Huysuz'la Görücü Usulü (2008)
- Dans Eder misin? (2005–2011)
- Benzemez Kimse Sana (2012–2015)
- Huysuz'la Yılbaşı Özel (2018)

Cinema

- Sarhoş (1977)
- Nokta ile Virgül Paldır Küldür (1979)
- Melek Yüzlü Cani (1986) - Seyfi
- Avrupa Yakası (2005) - Süheyla (episode 50)
- İmkansız Aşk (2006) - Neighbor (episode 3)
