= Grup Munzur =

- Origin: İzmir, Turkey
- Genres: Folk rock, folk, protest music, left, political music, türkü
- Instruments: Bağlama, davul, zurna, flute
- Years active: 1992–present
- Members: Özlem Gerçek, Mahir Çelebi, Ercan Duman
- Website: http://www.grupmunzur.com/

Grup Munzur is a Turkish band known for their protest songwriting and some of the group members were arrested and tried for their artistic activities. Grup Munzur was founded in 1992 in İzmir. Grup Munzur has yearly performed at Munzur Doğa ve Kültür Festivali in Tunceli Province. Musicians of Grup Munzur are known of their sympathy to the maoist movement.

== Discography ==
Albums

1. 1993 - Babanın Türküsü
2. 1995 - Hep Birlikte
3. 1997 - Tutuşturun Geceleri
4. 2000 - Beklenen Uzak Değil
5. 2003 - Bahara Çağrı
6. 2008 - Kızıl Anka
7. 2010 - Haykırış
8. 2016 - Hava Kurşun Gibi Ağır

== See also ==
- Bandista
- Grup Yorum
