= Ömer Döngeloğlu =

Turkish writer (1968–2020)

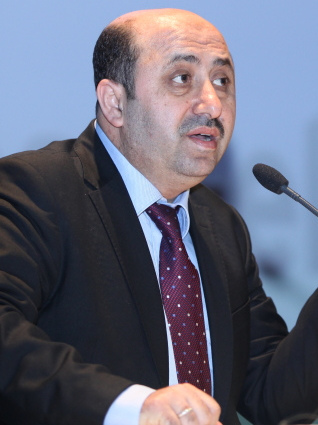
- Döngeloğlu in 2012

Personal life
- Born: 20 June 1968 Zile, Tokat, Turkey
- Died: 3 May 2020 (aged 51) Başakşehir, Istanbul, Turkey
- Cause of death: COVID-19
- Resting place: Edirnekapı Martyr's Cemetery, Edirnekapı, Istanbul; 41°02′1.68″N 28°55′58.80″E
- Main interest: Sīrah
- Education: Sakarya University

Religious life
- Religion: Islam
- Denomination: Sunni
- Jurisprudence: Hanafi
- Creed: Maturidi

Ömer Döngeloğlu (1968 – 3 May 2020) was a Turkish theologian, writer, producer and television presenter. He was known for the religious programs he hosted on Kanal 7.

== Life ==
He completed his primary education in Zile Altunyurt Primary School and his secondary education in Zile İmam Hatip High School. Later he graduated from Sakarya University School of Theology. He was fluent in Arabic and English.

Döngeloğlu worked as a preacher in his hometown in Tokat between 1986 and 1996. He worked in various administrative positions in the public sector for many years. He spent years researching, studying and reading Islamic history and Siyer-i Nebi.

== Death ==
He died on 3 May 2020, in Başakşehir State Hospital at age 51, where he was being treated for COVID-19 during the COVID-19 pandemic in Turkey, and was buried in Edirnekapı Martyr's Cemetery.

== Works ==
- Peygamberin İzinde
- Allah'a Adanmış Hayatlar
- Yeryüzünün Yıldızları
- Sözün Miracı; DUA
- Allah Resulünü Görenler
- Peygamberimizin Dostları
- Mus'ab bin Umeyr
