= Feriha Öz =

Turkish academic and pathologist (1933–2020)

- Born: Ganime Feriha Öz; 1933; Kadıköy, Istanbul, Turkey
- Died: 2 April 2020 (aged 86–87)
- Education: Istanbul Faculty of Medicine
- Scientific career
- Fields: Pathology
- Institutions: Cerrahpaşa Faculty of Medicine

Ganime Feriha Öz (1933 – 2 April 2020) was a Turkish academic, pathologist and medical doctor.

Öz graduated from Çamlıca Girls High School in 1951. She completed her education in Istanbul Faculty of Medicine in 1957. After graduation, she worked as a physician in Akdağmadeni district of Yozgat. She started her academic life at Cerrahpaşa Medical Faculty. She received the title of associate professor in 1968 and the title of professor in 1976. She had more than 100 scientific researches and publications, both on national and international scale. She retired from Cerrahpaşa Medical Faculty Pathology Department in 2000.

She died on 2 April 2020 due to complications from COVID-19. Sait Gönen, Dean of Istanbul University-Cerrahpaşa Faculty of Medicine, announced the news of her death on X. The Minister of Health Fahrettin Koca released a message of condolences. The Istanbul Chamber of Physicians confirmed the news of her death. On 3 April 2020, a farewell ceremony was held at the Cerrahpaşa School of Medicine for her.
