= Yusuf Kenan Sönmez =

Turkish politician (1948–2020)

Member of the Grand National Assembly (18th Parliament)
- In office 14 December 1987 – 20 October 1991
- Constituency: Istanbul (1987)

Personal details
- Born: 1948 Zonguldak, Turkey
- Died: 3 April 2020 (aged 71–72)
- Cause of death: COVID-19
- Party: Social Democratic Populist Party; Republican People's Party
- Children: 1
- Education: Istanbul Academy of Economic and Commercial Sciences

Yusuf Kenan Sönmez (1948 – 3 April 2020) was a Turkish politician.

He graduated from Istanbul Academy of Economics and Commercial Sciences, Department of Business Administration and Accounting. He worked as a manager in the private sector and engaged in free trade. In the 1987 election, he was elected as the representative of Istanbul from the Social Democratic Populist Party. Later, he served as the deputy chairman of the city of Istanbul and the delegate of the congress from the Republican People's Party. He was the founding chairman of Edremit Central District Agricultural Development Cooperative.

From 25 March 2020, he started receiving treatment at the Balıkesir State Hospital after he tested positive for coronavirus. On 3 April 2020, he died due to complications from COVID-19 at age 72.

He was married and had one child.
