= Fevzi Aksoy =

Turkish sports writer, medical doctor, neurologist, and academic (1930–2020)

- Born: 1 May 1930; İzmir, Turkey
- Died: 28 March 2020 (aged 89)
- Education: Istanbul Faculty of Medicine
- Scientific career
- Fields: Neurology (EEG, Epilepsy)
- Workplaces: Cerrahpaşa Faculty of Medicine

Fevzi Aksoy (1 May 1930 – 28 March 2020) was a Turkish sports writer, medical doctor, neurologist and academic.

He graduated from Pertevniyal High School in 1947. He continued his education at the Istanbul University Faculty of Medicine and graduated in 1953. He received the title of "Associate Professor" in 1968 and "Professor" in 1982. He worked on EEG and epilepsy in Germany between 1960 and 1967.

He worked in the Istanbul University Psychology Clinic and later worked as the head of Health, Culture and Sports Department of Istanbul University. He subsequently worked as an academic member of Istanbul Anatolian Sports Academy, Eskişehir Health Academy and Istanbul University Sports Vocational School. He started as a journalist in 1957 and became a sports columnist for Milliyet in 1967. He was a regular writer in the columns "Through the Eyes of a Psychologist" and "Out of Line". He retired from university in 1997. During his career, he also served as chairman of the Board of the German Hospital, was in charge of the Neurology Department at Haseki Hospital and worked as head of the Istanbul University Medico Social Center.

Aksoy died on 28 March 2020, due to complications from COVID-19. According to Sabah newspaper columnist Gürcan Bilgiç, he was infected with the disease "in a clinic in Osmanbey where he met his friends". He was buried in the cemetery in Kilyos.

== Awards ==
On 16 February 1990, Aksoy was presented with the insignia of the Order of Merit of the Federal Republic of Germany when he was the head of the Department of Health, Culture and Sports of Istanbul University and a faculty member of Cerrahpaşa Medical Faculty. The award was given to him by the Consul General Müller Chorus at the Consulate General of Germany in Istanbul. On 25 October 2001, he was given the "2000 Olympic Torch Award" by the Turkish Olympic Committee. He was also awarded the "Prof. Dr. Kaya Çilingiroğlu Sports Medicine Award". Aksoy was a recipient of the Decoration of Honour for Services to the Republic of Austria.
