= Engin Nurşani =

Kurdish–German folk musician (1984–2020)

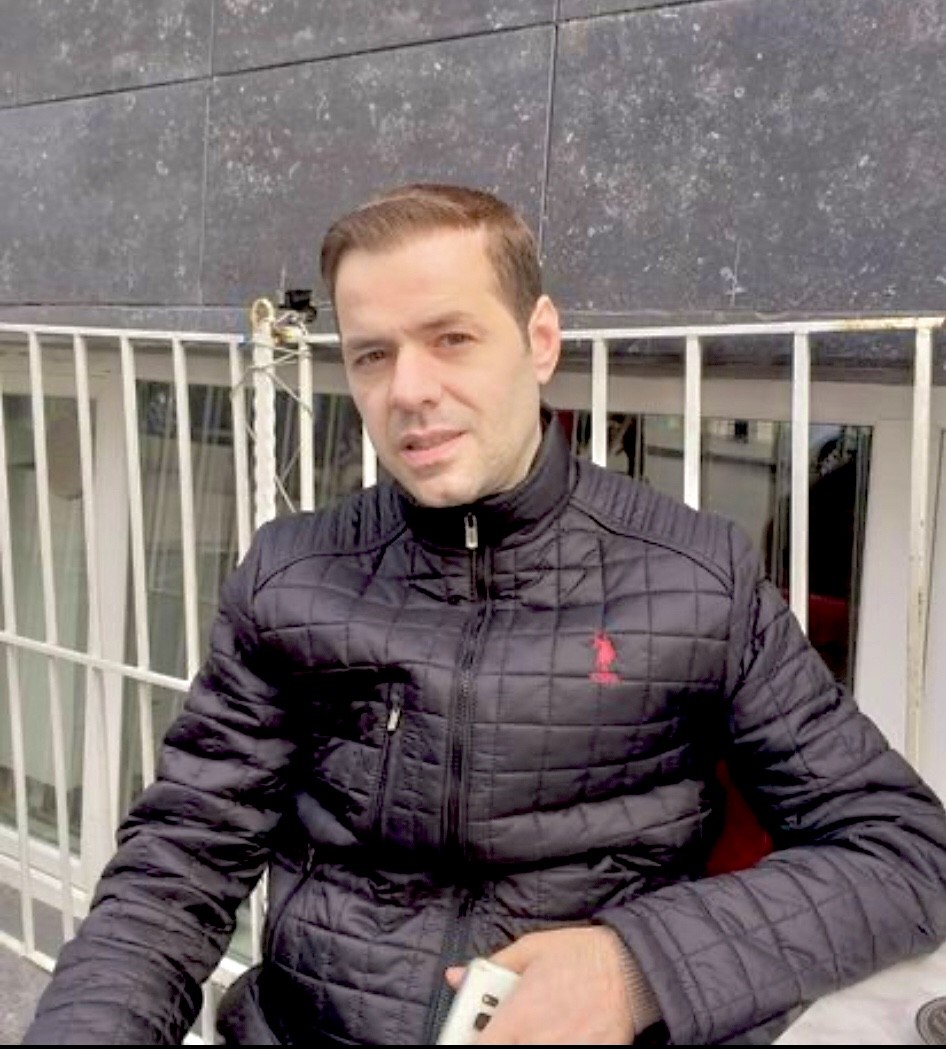
- Nurşani in 2019
- Born: Engin Ayhan; 9 January 1984; Krefeld, Germany
- Died: 25 December 2020 (aged 36); Istanbul, Turkey
- Spouse: Dilek Nurşani
- Children: 1
- Parent: Angelika Ayhan • Ali Ayhan
- Musical career
- Genres: Folk; türkü
- Years active: 2003–2020

Engin Ayhan (9 January 1984 – 25 December 2020), commonly known as Engin Nurşani, was a Kurdish-German folk musician. He started his music career with the Adına Bir Çizik Çektim album in 2003, and released eight albums in total until he had throat cancer in 2019 and took a temporary break from his music career. On 25 December 2020, he died at Istanbul Acıbadem Altunizade Hospital at around 07:00am (UTC+3).

== Life and career ==
Nursani was born in 1984 as one of two children of a Turkish father and a German mother. His father, Ali Ayhan (born 1959), is a folk music artist. When he was a child, he was trained in music by his father and attended concerts.

== Discography ==
- Adına Bir Çizik Çektim (2003)
- Mutlu musun? (2004)
- Sen Nefsine Köle Oldun (2006)
- Üç Ozan Üç Oğul (2008)
- Üç Ozan Üç Oğul 2 (2011)
- Gözün Aydın (2012)
- Kolay mı Sandın? (2017)
- Bu Dünyada Yalnız Kaldım (2021)
