= Communist Party of Turkey/Marxist–Leninist (Maoist Party Centre) =

Political party

The Communist Party of Turkey/Marxist–Leninist (Maoist Party Centre) (Turkish: Türkiye Komünist Partisi/Marksist-Leninist (Maoist Parti Merkezi)) is a clandestine communist party in Turkey, currently waging a war against the Turkish government. It was founded in 1987 when it split from Communist Party of Turkey/Marxist–Leninist.

== See also ==
- Peoples' United Revolutionary Movement
- Revolutionary People's Liberation Party/Front
- United Freedom Forces
