= Helin Bölek =

Kurdish singer (1991–2020)

- Born: 5 June 1991; Diyarbakır, Turkey
- Died: 3 April 2020 (aged 28); Istanbul, Turkey
- Cause of death: Hunger strike
- Resting place: Feriköy Cemetery
- Occupation: Singer
- Years active: 2015–2020

Helin Bölek (5 June 1991 – 3 April 2020) was a Kurdish member of the leftist Turkish folk music band Grup Yorum.

== Life ==
Bölek, the daughter of a family from Diyarbakır, worked in art during her youth. She took part in Grup Yorum as a soloist. She was arrested for the first time during a police operation at the İdil Culture Center in Istanbul in November 2016, when she was detained with seven other members of the group on charges of "resisting the police, insulting and being a member of a terrorist organization". The musicians Bahar Kurt, Barış Yüksel and Ali Aracı announced that they started an "indefinite and irreversible" hunger strike on 17 May 2019, to end the pressures from the state, the concert bans, and the raids on cultural centers.

Bölek joined the hunger strike in June 2019. She was released in November 2019 but kept on fasting. On 11 March 2020, İbrahim Gökçek and Helin Bölek were taken out to the Ümraniye Training and Research Hospital after a police raid that morning at their home in Küçük Armutlu, Istanbul. In a statement made by their lawyer Didem Ünsal, the two Grup Yorum members stated that they were taken to the hospital by ambulance and that they were admitted to the emergency room, where they declared that they did not accept intervention or treatment.

== Death ==
Bölek died on 3 April 2020, the 288th day of a hunger strike at her home in Istanbul. The hunger strike had been held as a means to protest the treatment of the band by the government of Turkey, which was led by Recep Tayyip Erdoğan. After her death, large crowds mourned Helin Bölek, and they began to march towards the cemevi in Okmeydanı, Istanbul. The police intervened the march and detained several participants, but the crowds managed to deliver her coffin to the cemevi. The crowds intended to go to the Feriköy Cemetery, but the police impeded it and detained several participants of the ceremony again. Afterwards, the police transported Helin Bölek to the cemetery.
