= Turhan Kaya =

Turkish actor (1951–2020)

- Born: 30 November 1951; Istanbul, Turkey
- Died: 31 March 2020 (aged 68); Kadıköy, Istanbul, Turkey
- Resting place: Baklacı Cemetery, Beykoz
- Education: Yeditepe University
- Occupation: Actor
- Years active: 1980s–2020
- Notable work: Kurtlar Vadisi Pusu (as Ordinaryüs)
- Children: 1

Turhan Kaya (30 November 1951 – 31 March 2020) was a Turkish theatre, movie and television actor.

== Life and career ==
Kaya was born on 30 November 1951 in Istanbul. He was a graduate of the Yeditepe University School of Communication. He studied acting in England and Italy. He started acting with theatre in the early 1980s, but later switched to television. He was known for playing the Ordinaryüs character in the series Kurtlar Vadisi Pusu. Some of his other productions include television series Kurşun Yarası, Çemberimde Gül Oya, Binbir Gece, Doktorlar, Bıçak Sırtı, Tatlı Bela Fadime, Melekler Korusun, and Bu Kalp Seni Unutur mu? as well as the movies Ayhan Hanım and Üç Kuruş. Kaya returned to television for his final role by portraying the character Cengiz Erkmen in the TV series Halka broadcast on TRT 1.

== Personal life and death ==
Turhan Kaya, who had a son from his French former wife, died on 31 March 2020, at the age of 68, at a hospital in Istanbul where he was being treated for COVID-19. His body was buried in a private ceremony on 1 April 2020, at the Baklacı Cemetery in Beykoz.
