= YDG SRA protein domain =

YDG Set and Ring Associated protein domain

Identifiers
- Symbol: YDG_SRA
- Pfam: PF02182
- InterPro: IPR003105
- SMART: SRA
Available protein structures:
- Pfam: structures / ECOD
- PDB: RCSB PDB; PDBe; PDBj
- PDBsum: structure summary

In molecular biology, this protein domain has been termed SRA-YDG, which is the abbreviation for SET and Ring finger Associated, YDG motif. Additional characteristics of the domain include conservation of up to 13 evenly spaced glycine residues and a VRV(I/V)RG motif. The protein domain is mainly found in plants and animals and in bacteria.

== Function ==
The function of this protein domain, in animals, is to aid progression through the cell cycle. This domain is associated with the Np95-like ring finger protein and the related gene product Np97, which contains PHD and RING FINGER domains; important in cell cycle progression. Np95 is a chromatin-associated ubiquitin ligase, binding to histones is direct and shows a remarkable preference for histone H3 and its N-terminal tail. The SRA-YDG domain contained in Np95 is needed for the interaction with histones and for chromatin binding in vivo.

In plants the SRA-YDG domain is associated with the SET domain, found in a family of histone methyl transferases, which switch genes "off" by adding a methyl group. In bacteria it is found in association with HNH, a non-specific nuclease motif.

== Structure ==
This protein domain contains both alpha helices and beta sheets. In particular, the beta sheets are arranged in an antiparallel formation. More specifically, it contains a beta grasp fold.
