= İbrahim Kaypakkaya =

Turkish Marxist-Leninist militant (1949–1973)

- Born: 1949; Karakaya, Sungurlu, Çorum, Turkey
- Died: May 18, 1973 (aged 23–24); Diyarbakır Prison, Diyarbakır, Turkey
- Cause of death: Torture
- Resting place: Karakaya Cemetery, Çorum
- Education: Istanbul University
- Occupations: Militant, writer, teacher, revolutionary
- Years active: 1967–1973
- Political party: Communist Party of Turkey/Marxist–Leninist; TİİKP; Workers Party of Turkey
- Movement: Maoism, Communism, Marxism-Leninism
- Parent(s): Ali Kaypakkaya (father); Mediha Kaypakkaya (mother)

İbrahim Kaypakkaya (1949 – May 18, 1973) was a Turkish Maoist revolutionary who founded the Communist Party of Turkey/Marxist-Leninist (TKP/ML) and started the Maoist insurgency in Turkey. He is revered by many today as a symbol of resistance and as an aggregator of the ideas of other major leaders and thinkers in Marxism–Leninism and Maoism. Kaypakkaya was captured after being wounded in an engagement with the Turkish military in Tunceli Province in 1973, and died in Diyarbakır Prison four months later.

== Biography ==
İbrahim Kaypakkaya was born in 1949 to a Turkish Alevi family. In his youth he delivered political magazines in the neighboring villages. Later he was exposed to revolutionary ideas as a student in the Physics Department of Istanbul University’s Faculty of Science. He became a member of the Revolutionary Workers and Peasants Party of Turkey. In 1967 he was one of the founders of a local branch of the Federation of Idea Clubs (Turkish: Fikir Kulüpleri Federasyonu). He joined the foundation of the Çapa Idea Club (Turkish: Çapa Fikir Kulübü) in March 1968 and became the President of the club. In November 1968, Kaypakkaya was expelled from the University for preparing a leaflet against the visiting 6th Fleet of the U.S. Navy.

Kaypakkaya, who adopted the view of National Democratic Revolution, worked for the newspaper İşçi Köylü ("Worker-Peasant"). He wrote articles in the magazines Aydınlık ("Enlightenment") and TÜRKSOLU ("Turkish Left"; not to be confused with the modern magazine Türksolu). Kaypakkaya then split from Doğu Perinçek and his group, as he considered Perinçek to be a revisionist and an opportunist. Kaypakkaya, who participated in the struggle of peasantry, formed TİKKO (Turkish: Türkiye İşci ve Köylü Kurtuluş Ordusu, "Workers' and Peasants' Liberation Army"), the armed wing of his Communist Party of Turkey/Marxist-Leninist.

Kaypakkaya and his comrades interrogated and shot the informer village headman who caused the killing of THKO (Turkish: Türkiye Halk Kurtuluş Ordusu; "People's Liberation Army of Turkey") members Sinan Cemgil and his two other comrades by the state forces during a gunfight.

=== Capture and death ===
Following the military memorandum of 1971, the Turkish government cracked down on the Communist movement in Turkey. On 24 January 1973, Kaypakkaya and his allies were attacked by Turkish military forces in the mountains of Tunceli. He was wounded badly, and his comrade Ali Haydar Yıldız died. The military left Kaypakkaya for dead, allowing him to avoid capture. During the winter, the severe weather conditions and snow forced him to take shelter in a cave for five days. Thereafter, he left for a village where he asked for assistance from Cafer Atan, a local teacher. Initially, the man allowed Kaypakkaya to take shelter in a room but then locked the door and reported him to the military.

The letter Kaypakkaya sent to his friends after he got captured by the gendarmerie:

They handed me over to the gendarmerie, and the gendarmerie beat me up terribly. After that, in short: I was delivered from Dersim to Elazığ, and from Elazığ to Diyarbakır. Except for random police investigations, no statements were taken. Now I am under both surveillance and treatment in Diyarbakır.

The wounds on my head and neck healed in just 20 days. By the way, let me state this: While I was injured, they tied both my arms for a week as if they were crucifying me. Upon insistence, they released one of the handcuffs. We were raided on January 26th. On February 22, I had surgery in both my feet. There is no finger left on my right foot. They left my little finger on my left foot as a gift.

The Turkish Government persecuted and destroyed the leadership of the TKP/ML. Kaypakkaya, and several of his colleagues were arrested. On 18 May 1973, he was tortured to the brink of death and then shot and killed by military officers at the age of twenty-four. His corpse was mutilated and cut up. The cause of Kaypakkaya's death was ruled as a suicide.

The National Intelligence Organization (Turkish: Milli İstihbarat Teşkilatı, MİT) reported that Kaypakkaya was the most dangerous revolutionary in Turkey and a serious threat to the anti-communist regime in Turkey.

==== Aftermath ====
The killing of Kaypakkaya resulted in a series of retaliatory attacks even many years later; Cafer Atan, the teacher who allegedly handed over Kaypakkaya to the gendarmerie, was shot in the head and killed in front of his wife and two children by three people who raided his house in Sarıgazi in 2000. Before the killing his attackers reportedly stated; "27 years ago, you handed over our leader İbrahim Kaypakkaya, who had taken refuge in Vartinik Village in Tunceli while wounded, to the gendarmerie. Now we are punishing you." Five years later Fehmi Altınbilek, who led the January 24 operation against and later capture of Kaypakkaya's group, was in June of 2015 left injured in an armed attack in Beşiktaş, in which armed assailants on motorcycle and shot at Altınbilek outside of the local gendarmerie command post.

== Ideology ==
İbrahim Kaypakkaya's ideological positions were shaped by the Sino-Soviet split, in which he favoured the then anti-revisionist People's Republic of China. As such, he is considered a Maoist, and this can be seen throughout his writings.

As such, Kaypakkaya adopted Mao Zedong's ideas, including (but not limited to) the People's War, which he applied in his own revolutionary fight.

As a Leninist, he was a strong supporter of Kurdish self-determination, unlike many others in the Turkish left. He articulated this in his most famous writing "On the National Question".

Another difference between Kaypakkaya and the broad Turkish left was his stark opposition to Kemalism. He controversially criticised Vladimir Lenin's strategic support for the movement and considered Kemalist Turkey a "Military Fascist Dictatorship".

Kaypakkaya opposed parties such as the Turkish Workers' Party since they were reactionary and did not hesitate to criticise them. He believed the TİP's slogans did not comply with the main teachings of socialism and that many of the leading figures of the Party at the time (Kemal Türkler, Yaşar Kemal, Rıza Kaus) were either unable to understand Proletarian Revolution or were opportunists who did not want to see the true class struggle.

== Legacy ==
After his death, Kaypakkaya became a martyr for the Turkish Communist revolutionary movement by "choosing to die rather than give information. Despite his young age, he was a prominent Marxist theorist in Turkey, and his influence can be felt in many international communist movements. His book "On the National Question" is read among Marxist circles, especially in the context of Kurdish self-determination.

Kaypakkaya's grave has been at the centre of many controversies, controls such as ID checks and drone surveillance reportedly become 'routine' during commemorations held at the graveside, whilst in 2012 İbrahim's mother, Şükran Kaypakkaya, alongside others became subject to criminal indictment for “making propaganda for a terrorist organization and praising crime and a criminal.” after a yearly ceremony to commemorate her son, claiming only to want to water the flowers around the grave. In 2025, a camera was set up to watch his grave, and this was reported on by several anti-government outlets.

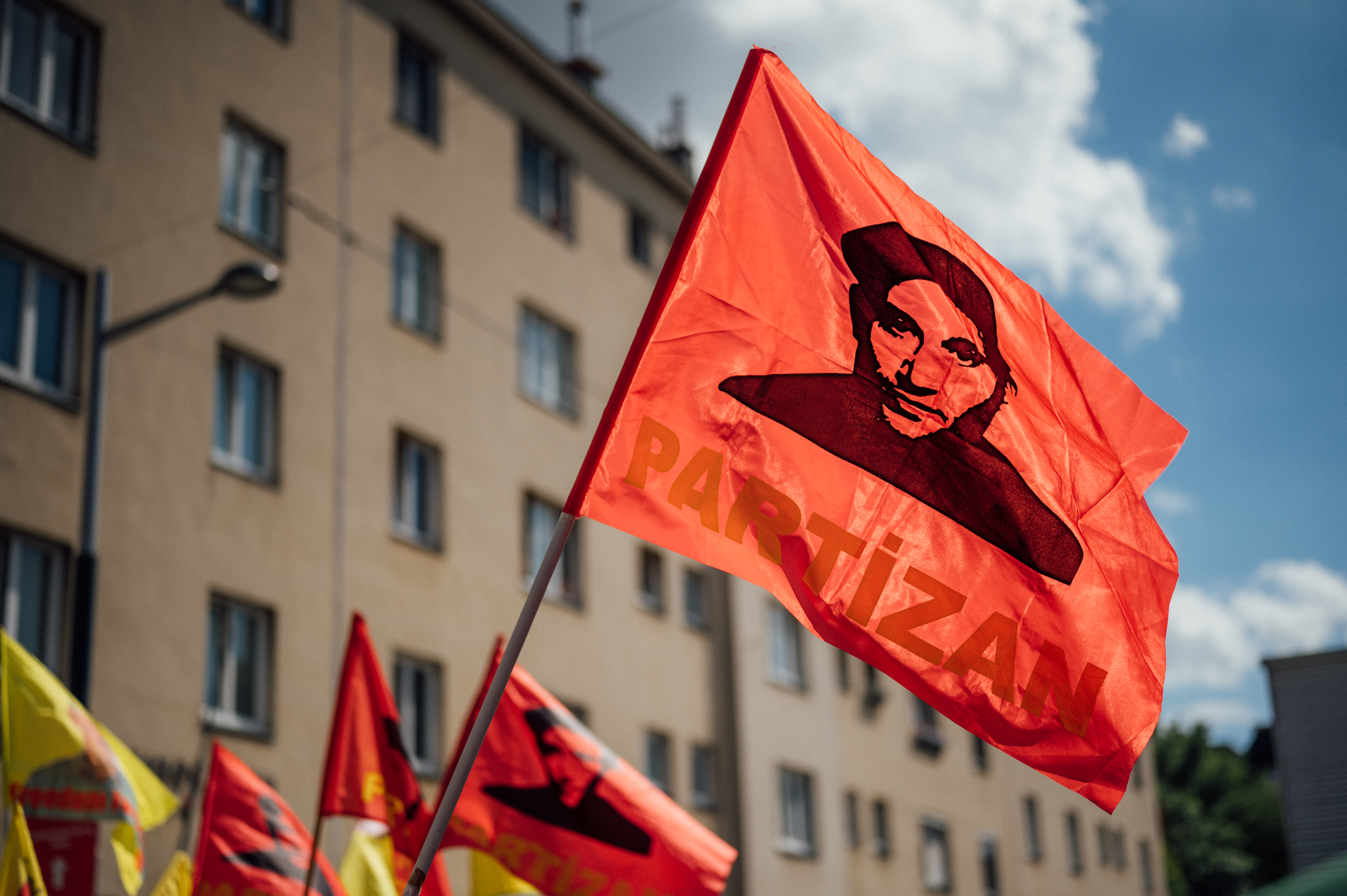
Kaypakkaya has significantly influenced the Turkish left

== In culture ==
=== Music ===
- Grup Munzur - İsyan Ateşi
- Emekçi - İbrahime Ağıt
- Ozan Emekçi - Diyarbakır Zindanları
- İlkay Akkaya - İbrahim yoldaş
- Can Cihan - İbo Haydar Zülfikar
- Ozan Rençber - Gel Gidelim İbo
- Mahzuni şerif - İbom ölüyor

=== Films ===
- Kırmızı Gül Buz İçinde (Red Rose in Ice, 1998)
- Sönmeyen Ateş - İbrahim Kaypakkaya (The Inextinguishable Fire - Ibrahim Kaypakkaya)
