= Mustafa Kemal Atatürk =

President of Turkey from 1923 to 1938

Halâskâr Gazi; Mareşal; Mustafa Kemal Atatürk
- Atatürk in 1932

1st President of Turkey
- In office 29 October 1923 – 10 November 1938
- Prime Minister: İsmet İnönü; Fethi Okyar; Celâl Bayar
- Preceded by: Office established
- Succeeded by: İsmet İnönü

Leader of the Republican People's Party
- In office 9 September 1923 – 10 November 1938
- Preceded by: Office established
- Succeeded by: İsmet İnönü

1st Prime Minister of the Government of the Grand National Assembly
- In office 3 May 1920 – 24 January 1921
- Deputy: Fevzi Çakmak
- Preceded by: Office established
- Succeeded by: Fevzi Çakmak

Speaker of the Grand National Assembly
- In office 24 April 1920 – 29 October 1923
- Preceded by: Office established
- Succeeded by: Fethi Okyar

Member of the Grand National Assembly
- In office 23 April 1920 – 10 November 1938
- Constituency: Ankara

Personal details
- Born: Ali Rıza oğlu Mustafa (Note: Ottoman Turkish: علی رضا اوغلی مصطفی, meaning 'Mustafa, son of Ali Rıza'.) c. 1881 Salonica, Ottoman Empire
- Died: 10 November 1938 (aged 56–57) Istanbul, Turkey
- Resting place: Anıtkabir, Ankara (Note: Previously interred at Ethnography Museum of Ankara until 10 November 1953)
- Party: Republican People's Party
- Other political affiliations: Motherland and Liberty (1906–1907); Committee of Union and Progress (1907–1918); Ottoman Liberal People's Party (1918–1919); Association for the Defence of the Rights of Anatolia and Rumelia (1919–1923)
- Spouse: Latife Uşaklıgil (m. 1923; div. 1925)
- Parents: Ali Rıza Efendi (father); Zübeyde Hanım (mother)
- Relatives: Makbule Atadan (sister)
- Education: Ottoman Military Academy; Ottoman Military College

Military service
- Allegiance: Ottoman Empire (1893–1919); State of Turkey (1921–1923); Republic of Turkey (1923–1927)
- Branch/service: Ottoman Army; Army of the GNA; Turkish Army
- Rank: Brigadier General (Ottoman Army); Marshal (Turkish Army)
- Commands: 19th Division; 16th Corps; 2nd Army; 7th Army; Yıldırım Army Group; Army of Grand National Assembly
- Battles/wars: See list: Macedonian Struggle; Young Turk Revolution; 31 March Incident; Albanian Revolt of 1910; Italo-Turkish War; Battle of Tobruk; Battle of Derna; Balkan Wars; First Balkan War; Bulgarian front; Battle of Bulair; Second Balkan War; Siege of Adrianople (1913); World War I; Middle Eastern theatre; Gallipoli campaign (WIA); Anzac Cove; Baby 700; No. 3 Post; Nek; Chunuk Bair; Scimitar Hill; Kılıçbayır; Hill 60; Suvla Bay; Anafartalar I; Anafartalar II; Kocaçimen tepe; Sari Bair; Caucasus campaign; Battle of Bitlis; Ognot campaign; Battle of Çapakçur; Sinai and Palestine campaign; Southern Palestine; Transjordan III; Nablus; Megiddo; Jisr ed Damieh; Damascus; Jisr Benat Yakub; Kiswe; Kaukab; Haritan I; Khan Ayash; Aleppo; Haritan II; Turkish War of Independence; Greco-Turkish War; Sakarya; Great Offensive; Dumlupınar; Turkish invasion of Armenia; Revolts; Anglo-Turkish War; Assyrian rebellion; Simko Shikak revolt (1918–1922); Kurdish–Turkish conflict; Koçgiri rebellion; Beytussebab rebellion; Sheikh Said rebellion; Ararat rebellion; Ararat I [tr]; Ararat II [tr]; Ararat III; Dersim rebellion

Mustafa Kemal Atatürk (Note: /ˈmʊstəfə kəˌmɑːl ˈætətɜːrk/ MUUST-ə-fə kə-MAHL AT-ə-turk, Turkish: [mustaˈfa ceˈmal aˈtatyɾc]. Also known as Mustafa Kemal Pasha (Note: Ottoman Turkish: مصطفی كمال پاشا; Turkish: Mustafa Kemal Paşa; in this Ottoman Turkish style name, the given name is Mustafa Kemal, the title is Pasha, and there is no family name.) until 1921, and Ghazi Mustafa Kemal (Note: Ottoman Turkish: غازی مصطفی كمال; Turkish: Gazi Mustafa Kemal; in this Ottoman Turkish style name, the given name is Mustafa Kemal, the title is Ghazi, and there is no family name.) from 1921 until the Surname Law of 1934. After the Surname Law of 1934, he first appeared as Kemal Atatürk and then as Kamâl Atatürk on his identity documents. See name section.) (c. 1881 (Note: Atatürk's birthday is unknown. 19 May–the day he landed to Samsun in 1919 to start the nationalist resistance–is considered his symbolic birthday. It was also claimed that he was born in 1880. See Personal life of Atatürk § Birth date.) – 10 November 1938) was a Turkish field marshal and revolutionary statesman who was the founder of the Republic of Turkey and served as its first president from 1923 until his death in 1938. He led sweeping reforms, turning Turkey into an industrialising nation. Ideologically a republican, secularist, and nationalist, his policies and socio-political theories became known as Kemalism. Atatürk's personality cult and the Kemalist historiography developed around it have had significant and ongoing influences on Turkey's political culture and historical narrative.

Born in Salonica in the Ottoman Empire, Atatürk was early on persecuted for agitating against Sultan Abdul Hamid II's autocracy, joining opposition movements like the Committee of Union and Progress and the Young Turks. He participated in the Young Turk Revolution and the 31 March Incident. His early military career saw him involved in the Italo-Turkish and Balkan Wars. He rose to prominence with his role in the Defence of Gallipoli during World War I. Following his country's defeat after the war, in the Turkish War of Independence he directed the Turkish National Movement in a nationalist resistance against Turkey's partition among the victorious Allied powers. Establishing the provisional "Ankara government", he achieved a Turkish victory against Greece, Armenia, France, and the United Kingdom, confirmed in the Treaty of Lausanne. During and after the war, the ethnic cleansing of Armenians and Greeks from Anatolia outside of Istanbul, including the Kars region invaded by the Kemalist armies, was largely completed via large-scale massacres, flight, expulsions, and the population exchange between Greece and Turkey. His government subsequently proceeded to abolish the Ottoman sultanate in 1922 and proclaimed the Republic of Turkey in 1923.

As the president of the newly formed Turkish Republic, Atatürk introduced far reaching reforms to build a republican and secular nation-state with a modern, Western facing society. By the mid-1920s, opponents to Atatürk's rule were suppressed as a one-party regime was cemented around him. This included abolishing the Ottoman Caliphate and curtailing religion as part of a larger secularist campaign. The semi-secular Mecelle was replaced by a fully secular civil code. Western cultural mores were encouraged: such as the banning of the fez and certain men's clothing. State-owned enterprises were established, foreign industrial assets were nationalised, and the first five-year plan was implemented. He opened thousands of schools and introduced the Latin-based Turkish alphabet. Turkish women received equal civil and political rights during his presidency. His government carried out a policy of Turkification, trying to create a homogeneous, unified, and above all secular nation under the Turkish banner. Atatürk attempted rapprochement with Iran, Yugoslavia, Iraq, Romania, and Greece, as well as the creation of the Balkan Pact that resisted the expansionist aggressions of Italy and Bulgaria during the interwar period of the 1930s. He died on 10 November 1938 at Dolmabahçe Palace in Istanbul, at the age of 57; he was succeeded as president by his long-time prime minister İsmet İnönü.

Atatürk has been praised for his military accomplishments, nation-building efforts, social and economic reforms, and diplomatic successes, serving as an inspiration to anti-colonial and anti-imperialist movements. He has been condemned for instituting a one-party state, introducing assimilationist policies that targeted minorities like the Kurds, and continuing a persecution of Christian minorities started by the CUP, while conservative Muslims have criticised his secular agenda. The Turkish Parliament granted him the surname Atatürk in 1934, meaning "Father of the Turks" or "Turk like his ancestors", in recognition of the role he played in building the Turkish Republic.

== Early life ==
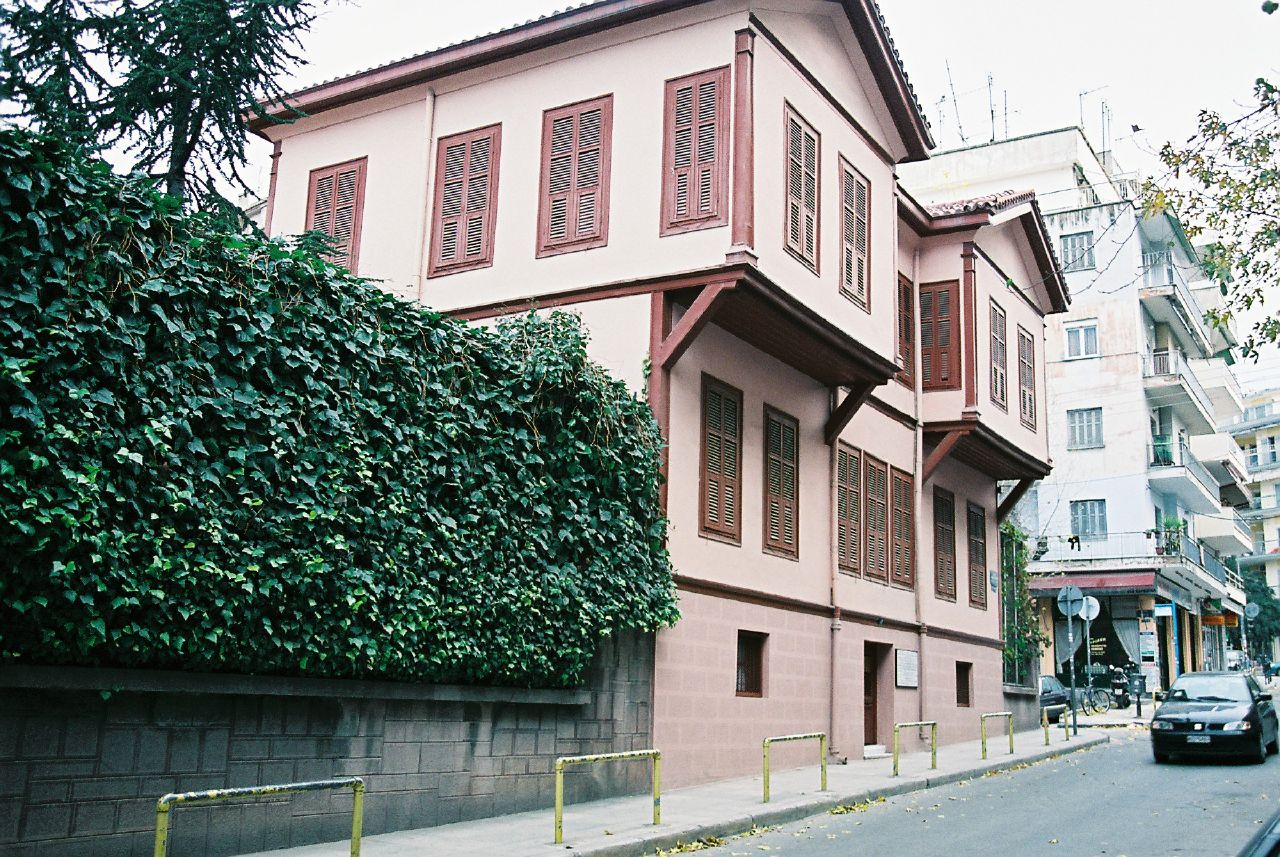
The house where Atatürk was born in the Ottoman city of Salonica, now a museum

Mustafa Kemal was born in Salonica (Selanik), Ottoman Empire. His parents were Ali Rıza Efendi, a military officer originally from Kodžadžik (Kocacık), title deed clerk and lumber trader, and Zübeyde Hanım. Only one of Mustafa's siblings, a sister named Makbule (Atadan) survived childhood; she died in 1956. According to information obtained from Mustafa Kemal Atatürk, Makbule Atadan, other family members, and childhood friends who knew Atatürk's family, Ali Rıza Efendi was originally from Salonica, and his wife, Zübeyde Hanım, was born to a farming family in Langaza, west of Salonica, in 1857.

=== Name ===
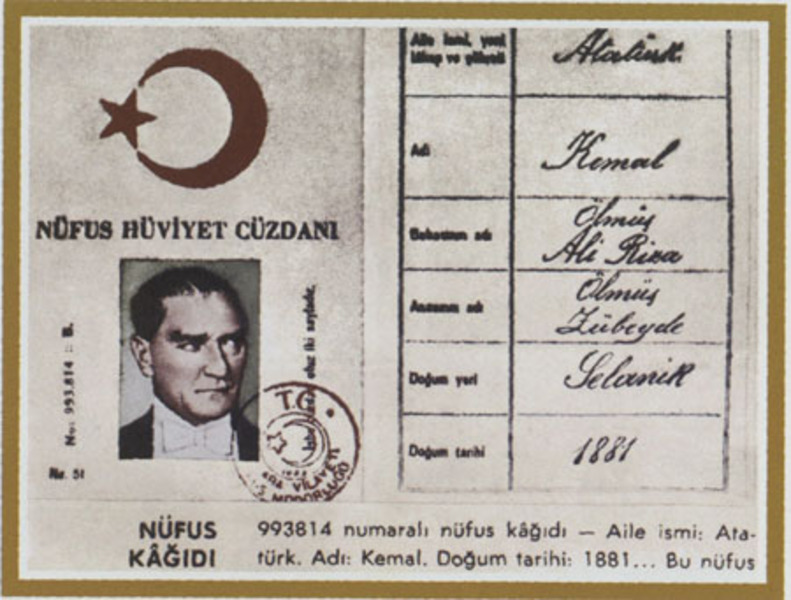
Atatürk's identity document with serial number 993 814

Atatürk was born Mustafa. The origin of his second name Kemal (meaning 'perfection' or 'maturity' in Arabic) is speculated; some claim that this name was given to him by his mathematics teacher, possibly "in admiration of [Atatürk's] capability and maturity"; while some others claim that his teacher gave him this name to distinguish him from himself, since his name was also Mustafa. Andrew Mango suggests that he may have chosen the name himself as a tribute to the nationalist poet Namık Kemal.

After receiving the surname Atatürk on his ID in 1934, he appeared as Kemal Atatürk, while the given name Mustafa had disappeared altogether. He used the Old Turkic name Kamâl from 1935 to 1937, which means 'fortification', 'fortress', 'army', or 'shield'.

=== Ancestry ===
Claims and theories about Mustafa Kemal's ancestry are strikingly varied and contrasting. According to Andrew Mango, his family was Muslim, Turkish-speaking and precariously middle-class. His father Ali Rıza is thought to have been of Albanian or Slavic origin by some authors; however, according to H. C. Armstrong, Falih Rıfkı Atay, Vamık D. Volkan, Norman Itzkowitz, Müjgân Cunbur, Numan Kartal and Hasan İzzettin Dinamo, Ali Rıza's ancestors were Turks, ultimately descending from Söke in Aydın Province of Anatolia. According to the claims by the Torbeš community, he descended from the Muslim Slavs: Pomaks (Bulgarian Muslims) or Torbeši (Macedonian Muslims). His mother Zübeyde is thought to have been of Turkish origin, and according to other sources, she was of Turkic Yörük ancestry. It was also claimed that she had Albanian or Macedonian ancestors. Due to the large Jewish community alongside Muslim (mainly Turks), Greek, Bulgarian, and other communities of Salonica vilayet in the Ottoman period, many of his Islamist opponents who were disturbed by his reforms claimed that Mustafa Kemal had Jewish Dönme ancestors.

=== Education ===
In his early years, his mother encouraged Mustafa Kemal to attend a religious school, something he did reluctantly and only briefly. Later, he attended the Şemsi Efendi School (a private school with a more secular curriculum) at the direction of his father. When he was seven years old, his father died. His mother wanted him to learn a trade, but without consulting them, Mustafa Kemal took the entrance exam for the Salonica Military School (Selanik Askeri Rüştiyesi) in 1893. In 1896, he enrolled in the Monastir Military High School (in modern Bitola, North Macedonia) where he excelled at mathematics. On 14 March 1899, he enrolled at the Ottoman Military Academy and graduated in 1902. He later graduated from the Ottoman Military College in Constantinople on 11 January 1905.

== Military career ==
=== Early years ===
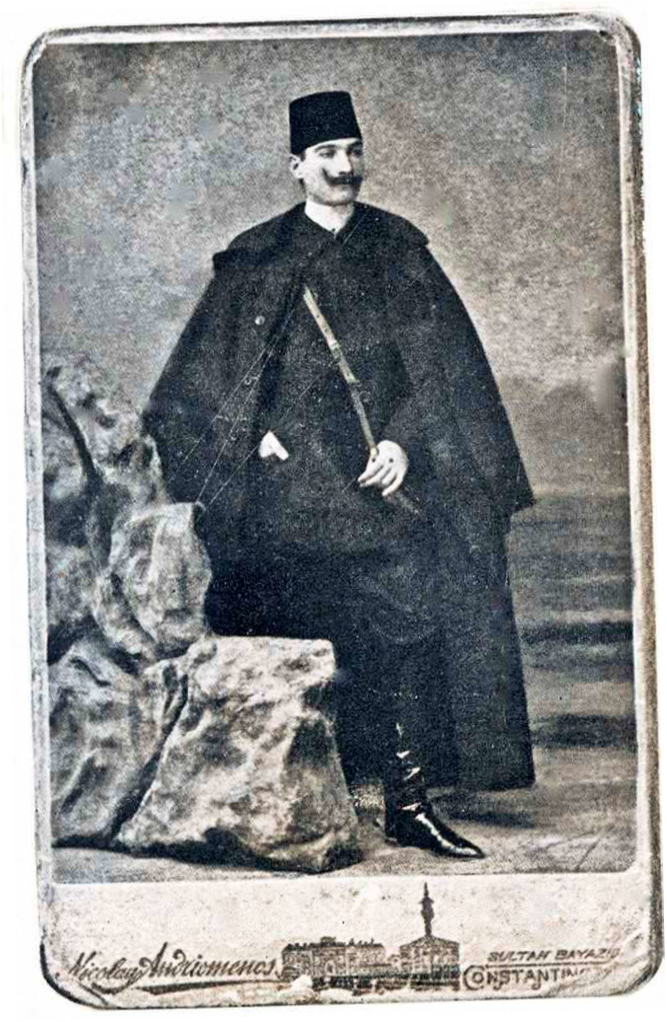
Mustafa Kemal on the day of graduation from the War Academy in 1905

Shortly after graduation, he was arrested by the police for his activities against Abdul Hamid II's regime. Following confinement for several months he was released only with the support of Rıza Pasha, his former school director. After his release, Mustafa Kemal was assigned to the Fifth Army based in Damascus as a Staff Captain in the company of Ali Fuat (Cebesoy) and Lütfi Müfit (Özdeş). He joined a small secret revolutionary society of reformist officers led by a merchant Mustafa Elvan (Cantekin) called Vatan ve Hürriyet ('Motherland and Liberty'). On 20 June 1907, he was promoted to the rank of Senior Captain (Kolağası) and on 13 October 1907, was assigned to the headquarters of the Third Army in Manastır. He joined the Committee of Union and Progress, with membership number 322, although in later years he became known for his opposition to, and frequent criticism of, the policies pursued by the CUP leadership. On 22 June 1908, he was appointed the Inspector of the Ottoman Railways in Eastern Rumelia (Doğu Rumeli Bölgesi Demiryolları Müfettişi), though this did not translate into a major role in the Young Turk Revolution of 1908.

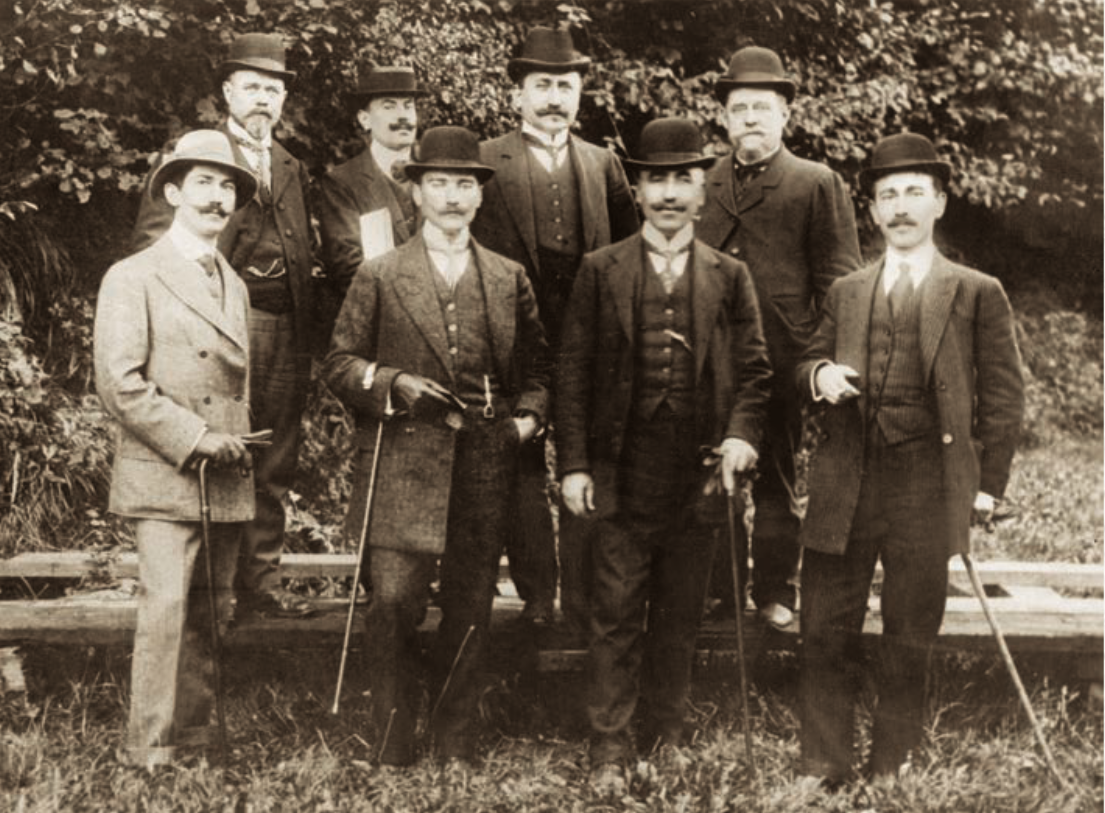
Mustafa Kemal (front row, second from left) with the Ottoman Turkish observers at the Picardie army manoeuvres in France, 28 September 1910.

He was assigned to go to Tripolitania Vilayet (present-day Libya, then an Ottoman territory) to suppress a tribal rebellion in 1908; he initially hesitated, but then decided that the task was important and that he should go. Kemal later interpreted this assignment as a conspiracy to remove him from Salonica and exclude him from CUP decision-making. However, Kemal was not involved in CUP decision-making in the first place and his selection for this mission instead indicated the leadership's trust. M. Şükrü Hanioğlu attributes Kemal's suspicion of a conspiracy to his desire for more important assignments and the CUP's unwillingness to give them to him. He suppressed the revolt and returned to Constantinople in January 1909.

In April 1909 in Constantinople, a group of soldiers began a counter-revolution (see 31 March Incident). Mustafa Kemal was instrumental in suppressing the revolt, and deposing Sultan Abdul Hamid II.

In 1910, he was called to the Ottoman provinces in Albania. At that time Isa Boletini was leading Albanian uprisings in Kosovo, and there were revolts in Albania as well. In 1910, Mustafa Kemal met with Eqrem Vlora, the Albanian lord, politician, writer, and one of the delegates of the Albanian Declaration of Independence.

Later, in the autumn of 1910, he was among the Ottoman military observers who attended the Picardie army manoeuvres in France, and in 1911, served at the Ministry of War (Harbiye Nezareti) in Constantinople for a short time.

=== Italo-Turkish War (1911–1912) ===
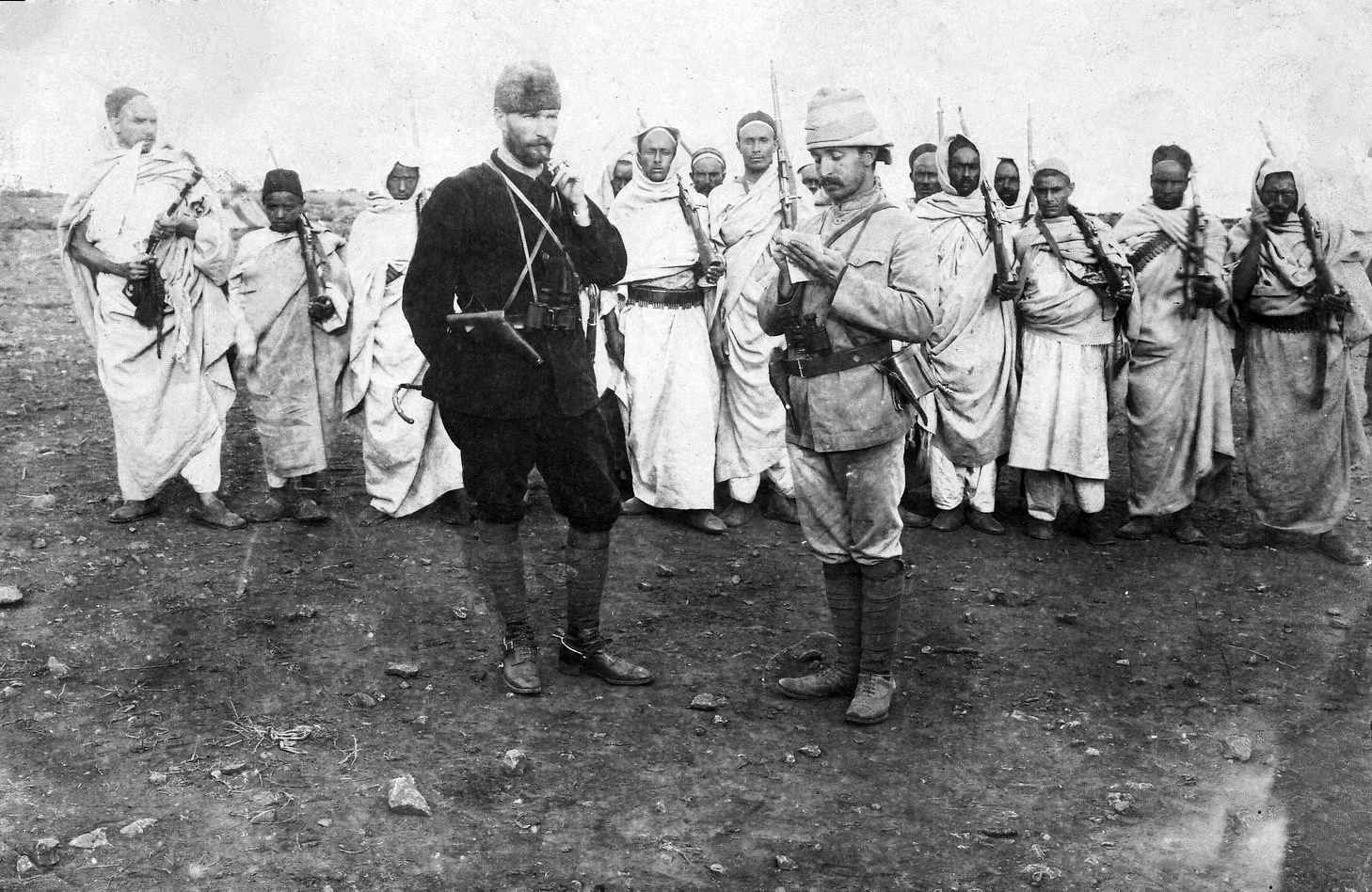
Mustafa Kemal (left) with an Ottoman military officer and Bedouin forces in Derna, Tripolitania Vilayet, 1912

In 1911, he volunteered to fight in the Italo-Turkish War in the Ottoman Tripolitania Vilayet (present-day Libya). He served mainly in the areas near Derna and Tobruk. The invading Italian army had a strength of 150,000 men; it was opposed by 20,000 Bedouins and 8,000 Turks. A short time before Italy declared war, many of the Ottoman troops in Libya were sent to the Ottoman province of Yemen Vilayet to put down the rebellion there, so the Ottoman government was caught with inadequate resources to counter the Italians in Libya. Britain, which controlled the Ottoman provinces of Egypt and Sudan, did not allow additional Ottoman troops to reach Libya through Egypt. Ottoman soldiers like Mustafa Kemal went to Libya either dressed as Arabs (risking imprisonment if noticed by the British authorities in Egypt) or by the very few available ferries (the Italians, who had superior naval forces, effectively controlled the sea routes to Tripoli). However, despite all the hardships, Mustafa Kemal's forces in Libya managed to repel the Italians on a number of occasions, such as at the Battle of Tobruk on 22 December 1911.

During the Battle of Derna on 16–17 January 1912, while Mustafa Kemal was assaulting the Italian-controlled fortress of Kasr-ı Harun, two Italian planes dropped bombs on the Ottoman forces; a limestone splinter from a damaged building's rubble struck Mustafa Kemal's left eye, causing permanent tissue damage, but not total loss of sight. He received medical treatment for nearly a month; he attempted to leave the Red Crescent's health facilities after only two weeks, but when his eye's situation worsened, he had to return and resume treatment. On 6 March 1912, Mustafa Kemal became the Commander of the Ottoman forces in Derna. He managed to defend and retain the city and its surrounding region until the end of the Italo-Turkish War on 18 October 1912. Mustafa Kemal, Enver Bey, Fethi Bey, and the other Ottoman military commanders in Libya had to return to Ottoman Europe following the outbreak of the Balkan Wars on 8 October 1912. Having lost the war, the Ottoman government had to surrender Tripolitania, Fezzan, and Cyrenaica (three provinces forming present-day Libya) to the Kingdom of Italy in the Treaty of Lausanne (1912) signed ten days later, on 18 October 1912. Since 1923, historians have preferred to name this treaty as the "Treaty of Ouchy", after the Château d'Ouchy in Lausanne where it was signed, to distinguish it from the later Treaty of Lausanne (1923) signed between the Allies of World War I and the Grand National Assembly of Turkey in Ankara.

=== Balkan Wars (1912–1913) ===
On 1 December 1912, Mustafa Kemal arrived at his new headquarters on the Gallipoli peninsula and, during the First Balkan War, he took part in the amphibious landing at Bulair on the coast of Thrace under Fethi Bey, but this offensive was repulsed during the Battle of Bulair by Georgi Todorov's 7th Rila Infantry Division under the command of Stiliyan Kovachev's Bulgarian Fourth Army.

In June 1913, during the Second Balkan War, he took part in the Ottoman Army forces commanded by Kaymakam Enver Bey that recovered Dimetoka and Edirne (Adrianople, the capital city of the Ottoman Empire between 1365 and 1453, thus of utmost historic importance for the Turks) together with most of eastern Thrace from the Bulgarians.

In 1913, he was appointed the Ottoman military attaché to all Balkan states (his office was in Sofia, Bulgaria) and promoted to the rank of Kaymakam (Lieutenant Colonel / Colonel) on 1 March 1914. While in Bulgaria, he met with Dimitrina Kovacheva, the daughter of Bulgarian general Stiliyan Kovachev (against whose forces he had fought during the Balkan Wars), who had recently completed her education in Switzerland, during a New Year's Eve ball in Sofia and fell in love with her. The two danced at the ball and started to secretly date in the following days. Mustafa Kemal twice asked Dimitrina's parents for their permission to marry her (the second time was in 1915, during World War I) and was twice refused, which left him with a lifelong sadness.

=== First World War (1914–1918) ===
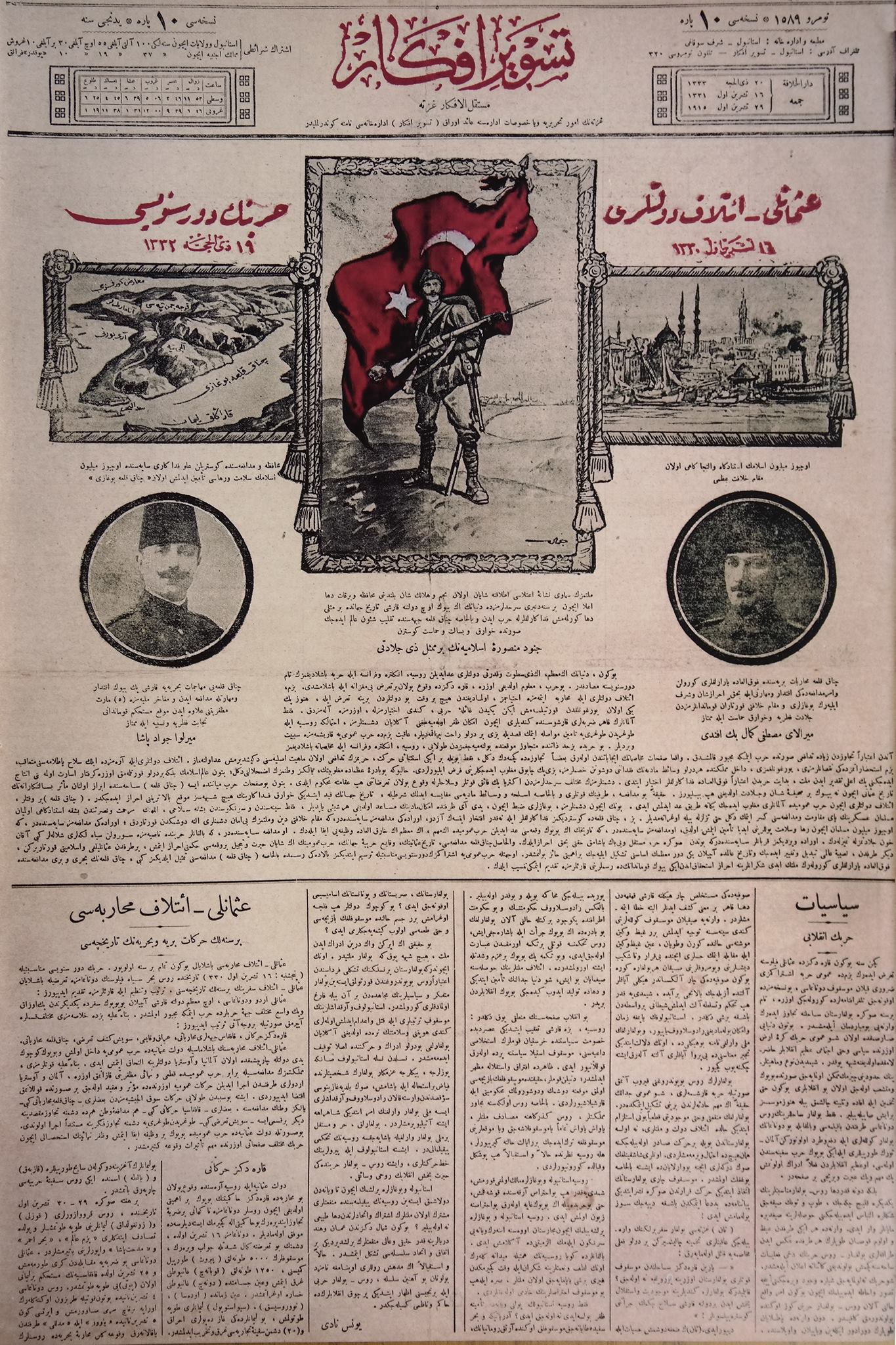
Cevat Pasha and Mustafa Kemal on the daily Tasvîr-i Efkâr dated 29 October 1915

In 1914, the Ottoman Empire entered the European and Middle Eastern theatres of World War I allied with the Central Powers. Within the factionalism between the Three Pashas, Mustafa Kemal navigated the turbulent CUP governments and the politicised military apolitically—though he privately expressed confidence in Talaat Bey, who controlled the civilian government. Among the many cliques formed around the many newly promoted Young Turk officers, Mustafa Kemal found a patron in Cemal Pasha. He did not respect his old classmate, and now War Minister, Enver Pasha, who was promited to the position from a junior colonelcy, and who orchestrated Turkey's entrance into a war Mustafa Kemal thought was a fatal mistake.

Mustafa Kemal was given the task of organizing and commanding the 19th Division attached to the Fifth Army during the Battle of Gallipoli. He became the front-line commander after correctly anticipating where the Allies would attack, and held his position until they retreated. Following the Battle of Gallipoli, Mustafa Kemal served in Edirne until 14 January 1916. He was then assigned to the command of the XVI Corps of the Second Army and sent to the Caucasus campaign after the massive Russian offensive had reached key Anatolian cities. On 7 August, he rallied his troops and mounted a counteroffensive. Two of his divisions captured Bitlis and Muş, upsetting the calculations of the Russian Command.

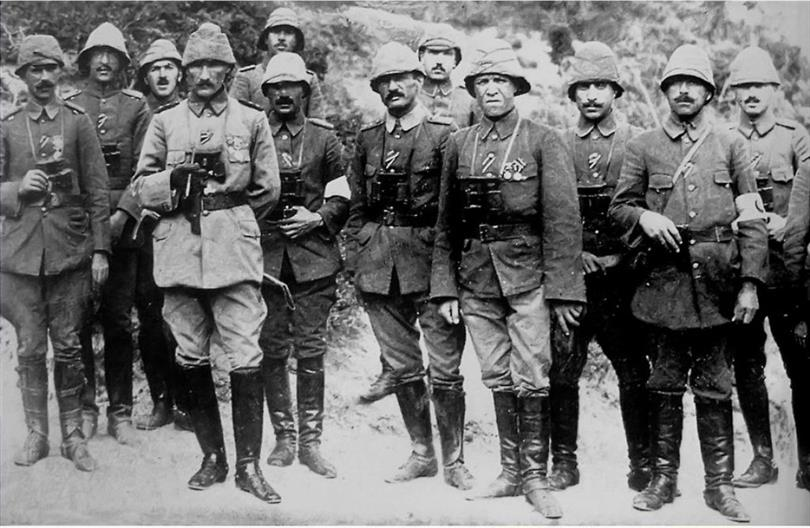
Mustafa Kemal with Ottoman military officers during the Battle of Gallipoli, Çanakkale, 1915

Following this victory, the CUP government in Constantinople proposed to establish a new army in Hejaz known as the Hejaz Expeditionary Force (Hicaz Kuvve-i Seferiyesi) and appoint Mustafa Kemal to its command, but he refused the proposal and this army was never established. Instead, on 7 March 1917, Mustafa Kemal was promoted from the command of the XVI Corps to the overall command of the Second Army, although the Czar's armies were soon withdrawn when the Russian Revolution erupted.

In July 1917, he was appointed to the command of the Seventh Army, replacing Fevzi Pasha on 7 August 1917, who was under the command of the German general Erich von Falkenhayn's Yildirim Army Group (after the British forces of General Edmund Allenby captured Jerusalem in December 1917, von Falkenhayn was replaced by Otto Liman von Sanders, who became the new commander of the Yıldırım Army Group in early 1918.) Mustafa Kemal did not get along well with General von Falkenhayn and, together with Miralay İsmet Bey, wrote a report to Grand Vizier Talaat Pasha regarding the grim situation and lack of adequate resources in the Palestinian front. However, Talaat Pasha ignored their observations and refused their suggestion to form a stronger defensive line to the north, in Ottoman Syria (in parts of the Beirut Vilayet, Damascus Vilayet, and Aleppo Vilayet), with Turks instead of Germans in command. Following the rejection of his report, Mustafa Kemal resigned from the Seventh Army and returned to Constantinople. There, he was assigned with the task of accompanying the crown prince (and future sultan) Mehmed Vahideddin during his train trip to Austria-Hungary and Germany. While in Germany, Mustafa Kemal visited the German lines on the Western Front and concluded that the Central Powers would soon lose the war. He did not hesitate to openly express this opinion to Kaiser Wilhelm II and his high-ranking generals in person. During the return trip, he briefly stayed in Karlsbad and Vienna for medical treatment between 30 May and 28 July 1918.

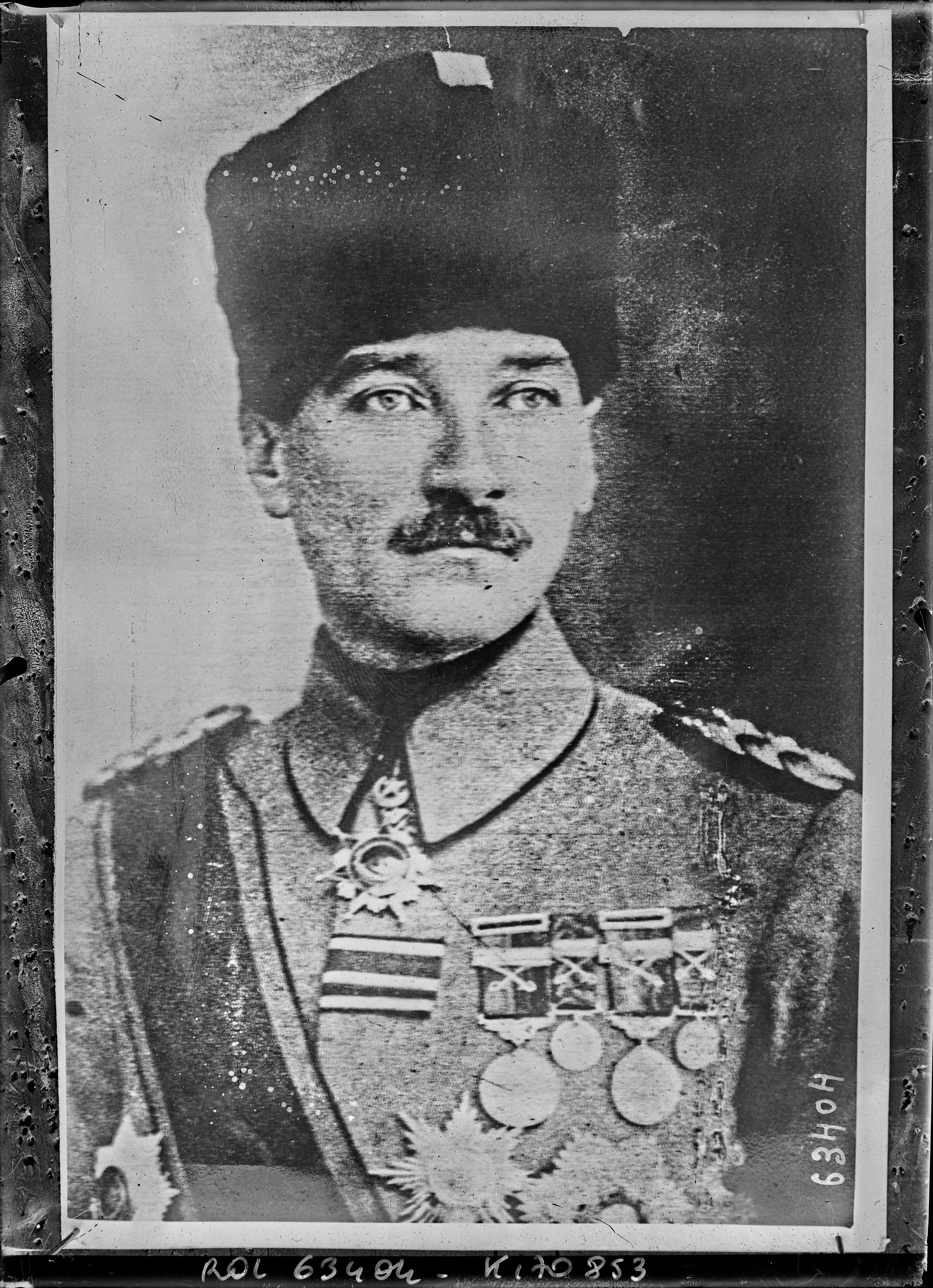
Mustafa Kemal in 1918, the Commander of the Yıldırım Army Group and an Honorary aide-de-camp of the Sultan

When Mehmed VI Vahideddin became the new Sultan of the Ottoman Empire in July 1918, he called Mustafa Kemal to Constantinople, and after several meetings in the months July and August 1918, reassigned him to the command of the Seventh Army in Palestine. Mustafa Kemal arrived in Aleppo on 26 August 1918, then continued south to his headquarters in Nablus. The Seventh Army was holding the central sector of the front lines. On 19 September, at the beginning of the Battle of Megiddo, the Eighth Army was holding the coastal flank but fell apart and Liman Pasha ordered the Seventh Army to withdraw to the north in order to prevent the British from conducting a short envelopment to the Jordan River. The Seventh Army retired towards the Jordan River but was destroyed by British aerial bombardment during its retreat from Nablus on 21 September 1918. Nevertheless, Mustafa Kemal managed to form a defence line to the north of Aleppo. According to Lord Kinross, Mustafa Kemal was the only Turkish general in the war who never suffered a defeat.

The war ended with the Armistice of Mudros which was signed on 30 October 1918, and all German and Austro-Hungarian troops in the Ottoman Empire were granted ample time to withdraw. On 31 October, Mustafa Kemal was appointed to the command of the Yıldırım Army Group, replacing Liman von Sanders. Mustafa Kemal organized the distribution of weapons to the civilians in Antep in case of a defensive conflict against the invading Allies.

Mustafa Kemal's last active service in the Ottoman Army was organizing the return of the Ottoman troops left behind to the south of the defensive line. In early November 1918, the Yıldırım Army Group was officially dissolved, and Mustafa Kemal returned to an occupied Constantinople, the Ottoman capital, on 13 November 1918. For a period of time, he worked at the headquarters of the Ministry of War (Harbiye Nezareti) in Constantinople and continued his activities in this city until 16 May 1919. Along the established lines of the partitioning of the Ottoman Empire, the Allies (British, Italian, French and Greek forces) occupied Anatolia. The occupation of Constantinople, followed by the occupation of İzmir (the two largest Ottoman cities at the time) sparked the establishment of the Turkish National Movement and the Turkish War of Independence.

=== Ottoman genocides (1913–1922) and Mustafa Kemal ===
Mustafa Kemal was a member of the Committee of Union and Progress (CUP), which initiated and implemented the Armenian genocide during the First World War, but was not directly involved in it. Since then, the degree to which he was critical or supportive of the genocide has been debated. In speeches for domestic audiences, Mustafa Kemal presented Turks as innocent of any wrongdoing and as victims of horrific Armenian atrocities. According to some accounts, he expressed disapproval of the events to foreign audiences. In the postwar period, the Turkish nationalists relied on the support of perpetrators of the genocide and those who had profited from it, the return of Armenian survivors was seen as a mortal threat to nationalist ambitions and was therefore made impossible. Mustafa Kemal's followers were responsible for expelling or murdering many Christians from Anatolia. Turkish generals were ordered "to eliminate Armenia physically and politically". Nearly 100,000 Armenians were massacred in Transcaucasia by the Turkish army and another 100,000 fled from Cilicia during the French withdrawal. After the foundation of the Republic of Turkey, CUP war criminals were granted immunity and later that year, the Treaty of Lausanne established Turkey's current borders and provided for the Greek population's expulsion. Its protection provisions for non-Muslim minorities had no enforcement mechanism and were disregarded in practice. Armenians who managed to avoid deportation and who lived outside the capital city continued to face forced Islamization and kidnapping of girls after 1923, while expulsions to Syria continued until 1929.

=== Turkish War of Independence (1919–1923) ===
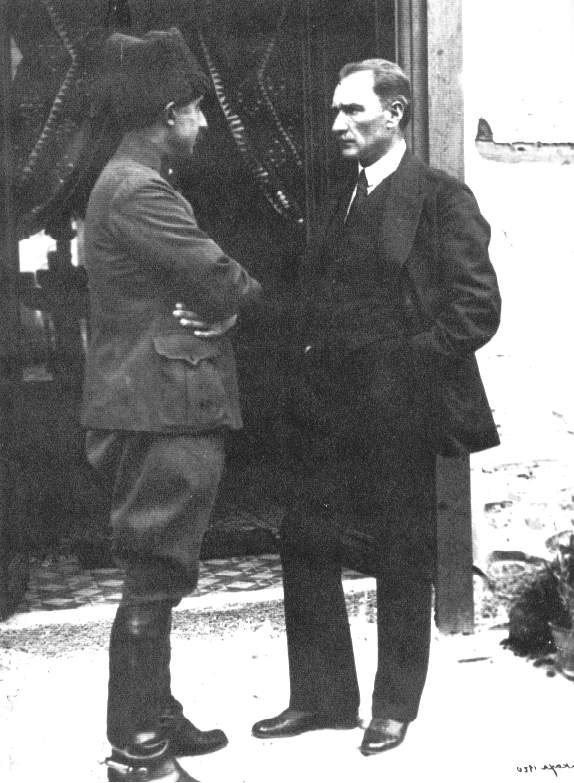
Mustafa Kemal (right) in Ankara with İsmet Pasha (left)

By December 1918, the leaders of the underground CUP resistance organization Karakol had approached Mustafa Kemal to lead an anti-Entente resistance movement. Historian Erik-Jan Zürcher argued that Kemal was particularly qualified as he was "trusted as a Unionist [CUP member] and a patriot but not too closely involved either with the ruling clique of Enver and Talaat or the Armenian massacres".

On 30 April 1919, Fahri Yaver-i Hazret-i Şehriyari ('Honorary Aide-de-camp to His Majesty Sultan') with the rank of Mirliva, Mustafa Kemal was assigned as the inspector of the Ninth Army Troops Inspectorate to reorganize what remained of the Ottoman military units and to improve internal security. This assignment effectively made him a plenipotentiary of Anatolia, giving him responsibility of all civil and military personnel in the area. On 19 May 1919, he reached Samsun. His first goal was the establishment of an organized national movement against the occupying forces. In June 1919, he issued the Amasya Circular, declaring the independence of the country was in danger. He resigned from the Ottoman Army on 8 July, and the Ottoman government issued a warrant for his arrest. But Kâzım Karabekir and other military commanders active in Eastern Anatolia followed Mustafa Kemal's lead and acknowledged him as their leader.

On 4 September 1919, he assembled a congress in Sivas. Those who opposed the Allies in various provinces in Turkey issued a declaration named Misak-ı Millî ('National Pact'). Mustafa Kemal was appointed as the head of the executive committee of the Congress, which gave him the legitimacy he needed for his future politics. Upon its conclusion a wave of governors and commanders pledged their loyalty to his Committee of Representation, those which didn't conform were overthrown by nationalist agents. The government in Istanbul pledged itself to a nationalist agenda with the Amasya Protocol.

The last election to the Ottoman parliament held in December 1919 gave a sweeping majority to candidates of the "Association for Defence of Rights for Anatolia and Roumelia" (Anadolu ve Rumeli Müdafaa-i Hukuk Cemiyeti), headed by Mustafa Kemal, who himself remained in Angora, now known as Ankara. The fourth (and last) term of the parliament opened in Constantinople on 12 January 1920. It was dissolved by British forces on 18 March 1920, shortly after it adopted the Misak-ı Millî ('National Pact'). This coincided with a general occupation of the city by the Allied forces. Mustafa Kemal called for a national election to establish a new Turkish Parliament seated in Angora. – the "Grand National Assembly" (GNA). On 23 April 1920, the GNA opened with Mustafa Kemal as the speaker; this act effectively created the situation of diarchy in the country. On 12 May 1920, the power struggle between the two governments led to a death sentence in absentia for Mustafa Kemal by the Turkish courts-martial. Halide Edib (Adıvar) and Ali Fuat (Cebesoy) were also sentenced to death alongside Mustafa Kemal.

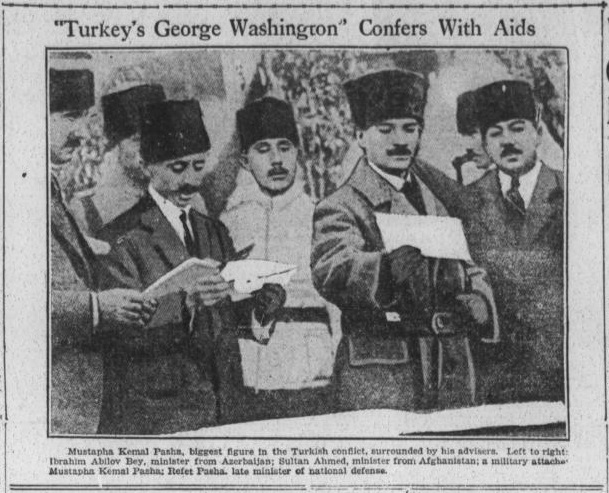
The Abilene Daily Reporter based in Texas, called Mustafa Kemal "Turkey's George Washington" on 13 October 1922

On 10 August 1920, the Ottoman Grand Vizier Damat Ferid Pasha signed the Treaty of Sèvres, finalizing plans for the partitioning of the Ottoman Empire, including the regions that Turkish nationals viewed as their heartland. Mustafa Kemal insisted on the country's complete independence and the safeguarding of interests of the Turkish majority on "Turkish soil". He persuaded the GNA to gather a National Army. The GNA army faced the Caliphate army propped up by the Allied occupation forces and had the immediate task of fighting the Armenian forces in the Eastern Front and the Greek forces advancing eastward from Smyrna (today known as İzmir) that they had occupied in May 1919, on the Western Front.

The GNA military successes in its invasion of Armenia in the autumn of 1920 and later against the Greeks were made possible by a steady supply of gold and armaments to the Kemalists from the Russian Bolshevik government from the autumn of 1920 onwards.

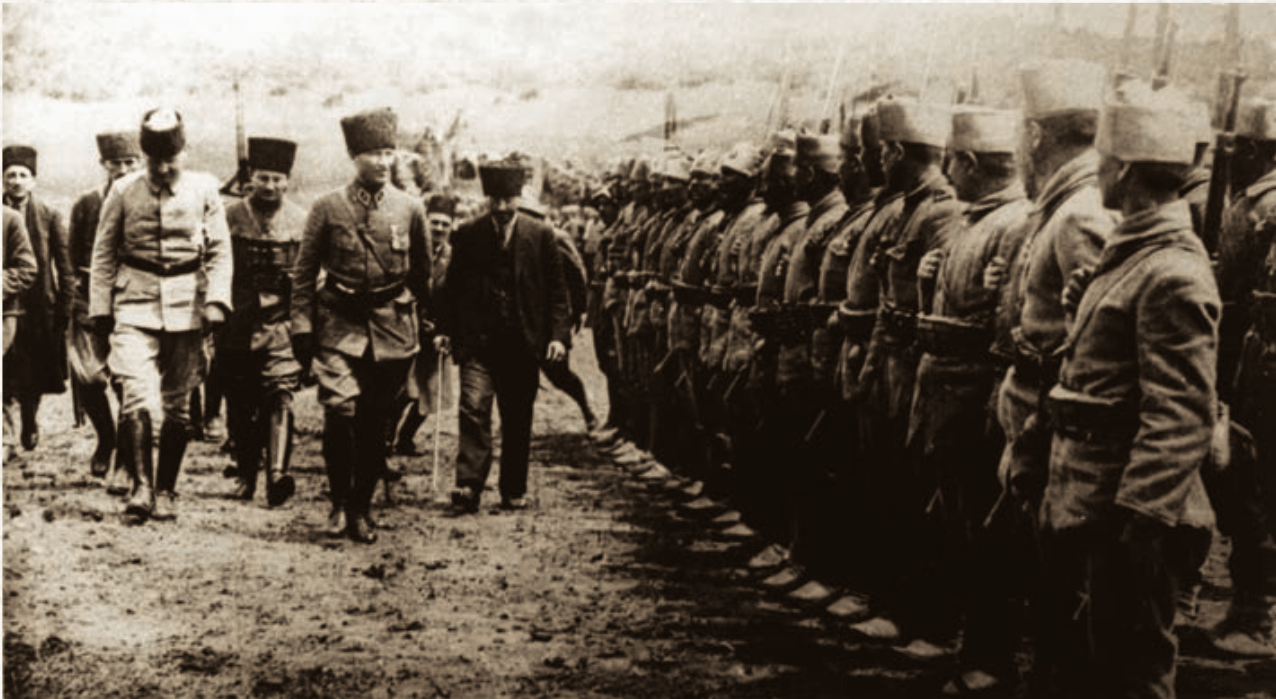
Mustafa Kemal inspects the Turkish troops on 18 June 1922

After a series of battles during the Greco-Turkish War, the Greek army advanced as far as the Sakarya River, just eighty kilometers west of Ankara. On 5 August 1921, Mustafa Kemal was promoted to commander in chief of the forces by the GNA. On 7–8 August, he issued the ten Tekâlif-i Milliye orders, imposing compulsory requisitions of civilian property, supplies and transport services to support the Nationalist army. The ensuing Battle of the Sakarya was fought from 23 August–13 September 1921 and ended with the defeat of the Greeks. After this victory, Mustafa Kemal was given the rank of Mareşal and the title of Gazi by the Grand National Assembly on 19 September 1921. The Allies, ignoring the extent of Mustafa Kemal's successes, hoped to impose a modified version of the Treaty of Sèvres as a peace settlement on Angora, but the proposal was rejected. In August 1922, Mustafa Kemal launched an all-out attack on the Greek lines at Afyonkarahisar in the Battle of Dumlupınar, and Turkish forces regained control of İzmir on 9 September 1922. On 10 September 1922, Mustafa Kemal sent a telegram to the League of Nations stating that the Turkish population was so worked up that the Ankara Government would not be responsible for the ensuing massacres.

=== Establishment of the Republic of Turkey ===
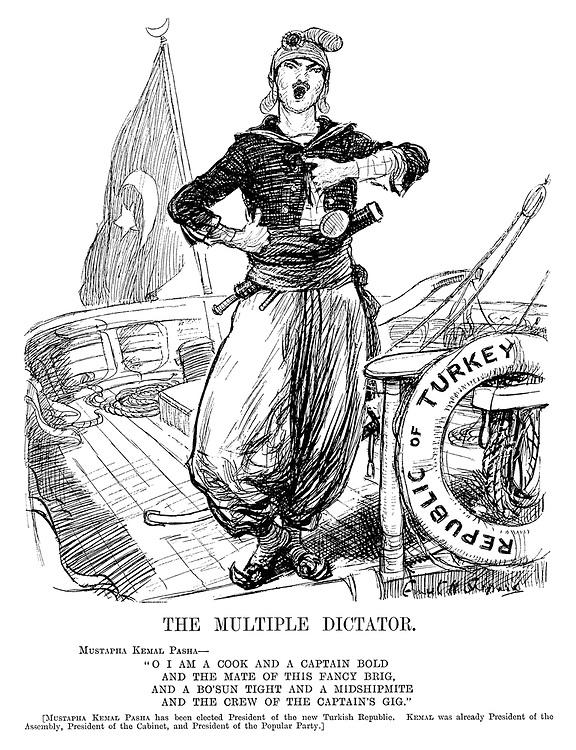
A British cartoon of 1923 satirising Mustafa Kemal's rule in Turkey

The Conference of Lausanne began on 21 November 1922. Turkey, represented by İsmet İnönü of the GNA, refused any proposal that would compromise Turkish sovereignty, such as the control of Turkish finances, the Capitulations, the Straits and other issues. Although the conference paused on 4 February, it continued after 23 April mainly focusing on the economic issues. On 24 July 1923, the Treaty of Lausanne was signed by the Powers with the GNA, thus recognising the latter as the government of Turkey.

On 29 October 1923, the Republic of Turkey was proclaimed. Since then, Republic Day has been celebrated as a national holiday on that date.

== Presidency ==
With the establishment of the Republic of Turkey, efforts to modernise the country started. The new government analyzed the institutions and constitutions of Western states such as France, Sweden, Italy, and Switzerland and adapted them to the needs and characteristics of the Turkish nation. Highlighting the public's lack of knowledge regarding Mustafa Kemal's intentions, the public cheered: "We are returning to the days of the first caliphs." Mustafa Kemal placed Fevzi Çakmak, Kâzım Özalp, and İsmet İnönü in political positions where they could institute his reforms. He capitalized on his reputation as an efficient military leader and spent the following years, up until his death in 1938, instituting political, economic, and social reforms. In doing so, he transformed Turkish society from perceiving itself as a Muslim part of a vast Empire into a modern, democratic, and secular nation-state. This had a positive influence on human capital because from then on, what mattered at school was science and education; Islam was concentrated in mosques and religious places.

=== Domestic policies ===
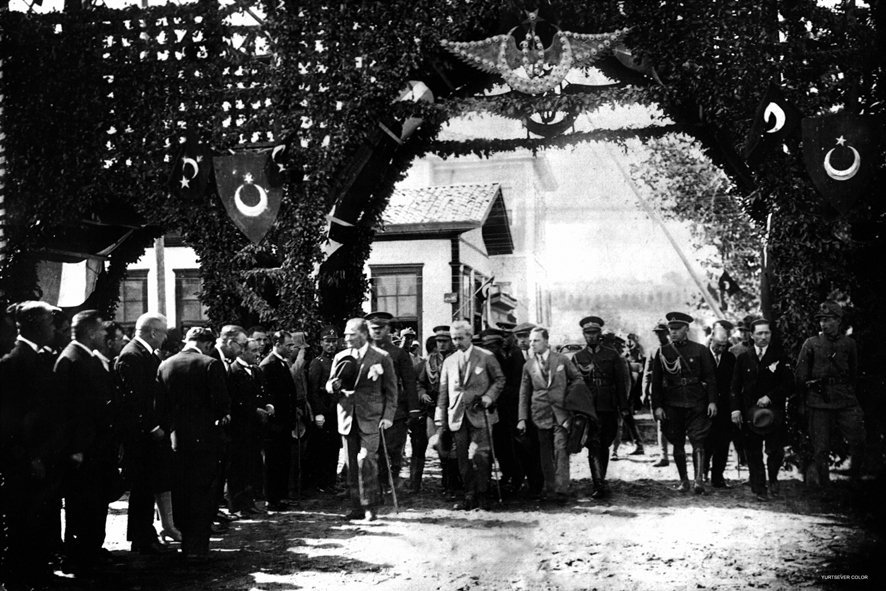
Mustafa Kemal at the opening ceremony of the Samsun-Çarşamba railroad (1928)

Mustafa Kemal's driving goal was the complete independence of the country. He clarified his position:

...by complete independence, we mean of course complete economic, financial, juridical, military, cultural independence and freedom in all matters. Being deprived of independence in any of these is equivalent to the nation and country being deprived of all its independence.

He led wide-ranging reforms in social, cultural, and economic aspects, establishing the new Republic's backbone of legislative, judicial, and economic structures. Though he was later idealized by some as an originator of sweeping reforms, many of his reformist ideas were already common in Ottoman intellectual circles at the turn of the 20th century and were expressed more openly after the Young Turk Revolution.

Mustafa Kemal created a banner to mark the changes between the old Ottoman and the new republican rule. Each change was symbolized as an arrow in this banner. This defining ideology of the Republic of Turkey is referred to as the "Six Arrows", or Kemalism. Kemalism is based on Mustafa Kemal's conception of realism and pragmatism. The fundamentals of nationalism, populism, and statism were all defined under the Six Arrows. These fundamentals were not new in world politics or, indeed, among the elite of Turkey. What made them unique was that these interrelated fundamentals were explicitly formulated for Turkey's needs. A good example is the definition and application of secularism; the Kemalist secular state significantly differed from predominantly Christian states.

==== Emergence of the state, 1923–1924 ====
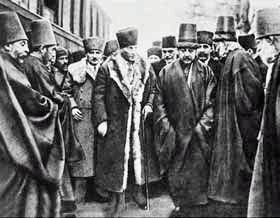
Mustafa Kemal in 1923, with members of the Mevlevi Order, before its institutional expression became illegal and their dervish lodge was changed into the Mevlana Museum. The Mevlevi Order managed to transform itself into a non-political organization which still exists.

Mustafa Kemal's private journal entries dated before the establishment of the republic in 1923 show that he believed in the importance of the sovereignty of the people. In forging the new republic, the Turkish revolutionaries turned their back on the perceived corruption and decadence of cosmopolitan Constantinople and its Ottoman heritage. For instance, they made Ankara (as Angora has been known in English since 1930), the country's new capital and reformed the Turkish postal service. Once a provincial town deep in Anatolia, the city was thus turned into the center of the independence movement. Mustafa Kemal wanted a "direct government by the Assembly" and visualized a representative democracy, parliamentary sovereignty, where the National Parliament would be the ultimate source of power.

In the following years, he altered his stance somewhat; the country needed an immense amount of reconstruction, and "direct government by the Assembly" could not survive in such an environment. The revolutionaries faced challenges from the supporters of the old Ottoman regime, and also from the supporters of newer ideologies such as communism and fascism. Mustafa Kemal saw the consequences of fascist and communist doctrines in the 1920s and 1930s and rejected both. He prevented the spread into Turkey of the totalitarian party rule which held sway in the Soviet Union, Germany, and Italy. Some perceived his opposition and silencing of these ideologies as a means of eliminating competition; others believed it was necessary to protect the young Turkish state from succumbing to the instability of new ideologies and competing factions. Under Mustafa Kemal, the arrest process known as the 1927 Detentions (1927 Tevkifatı) was launched, and a widespread arrest policy was put in place against the Communist Party of Turkey members. Communist political figures such as Hikmet Kıvılcımlı, Nâzım Hikmet, and Şefik Hüsnü were tried and sentenced to prison terms. Then, in 1937, a delegation headed by Mustafa Kemal decided to censor the writings of Kıvılcımlı as harmful communist propaganda.

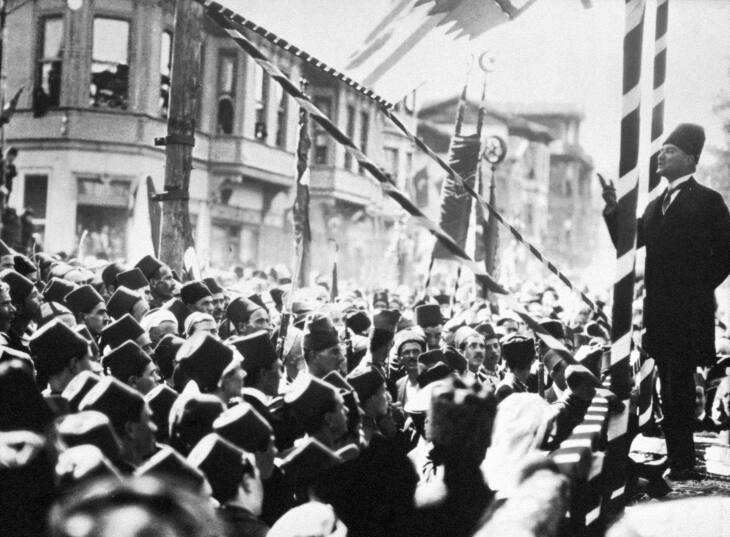
In 1924, during his speech in Bursa

The heart of the new republic was the GNA, established during the Turkish War of Independence by Mustafa Kemal. The elections were free and used an egalitarian electoral system that was based on a general ballot. Deputies at the GNA served as the voice of Turkish society by expressing its political views and preferences. It had the right to select and control both the government and the Prime Minister. Initially, it also acted as a legislative power, controlling the executive branch and, if necessary, served as an organ of scrutiny under the Turkish Constitution of 1921. The Turkish Constitution of 1924 set a loose separation of powers between the legislative and the executive organs of the state, whereas the separation of these two within the judiciary system was a strict one. Mustafa Kemal, then the President, occupied a dominant position in this political system.

The one-party regime was established de facto in 1925 after the adoption of the 1924 constitution. The only political party of the GNA was the "People's Party", founded by Mustafa Kemal on 9 September 1923. (But according to the party culture the foundation date was the opening day of Sivas Congress on 4 September 1919). On 10 November 1924, it was renamed Cumhuriyet Halk Fırkası or Republican People's Party (the word fırka was replaced by the word parti in 1935).

==== Civic independence and the caliphate, 1924–1925 ====
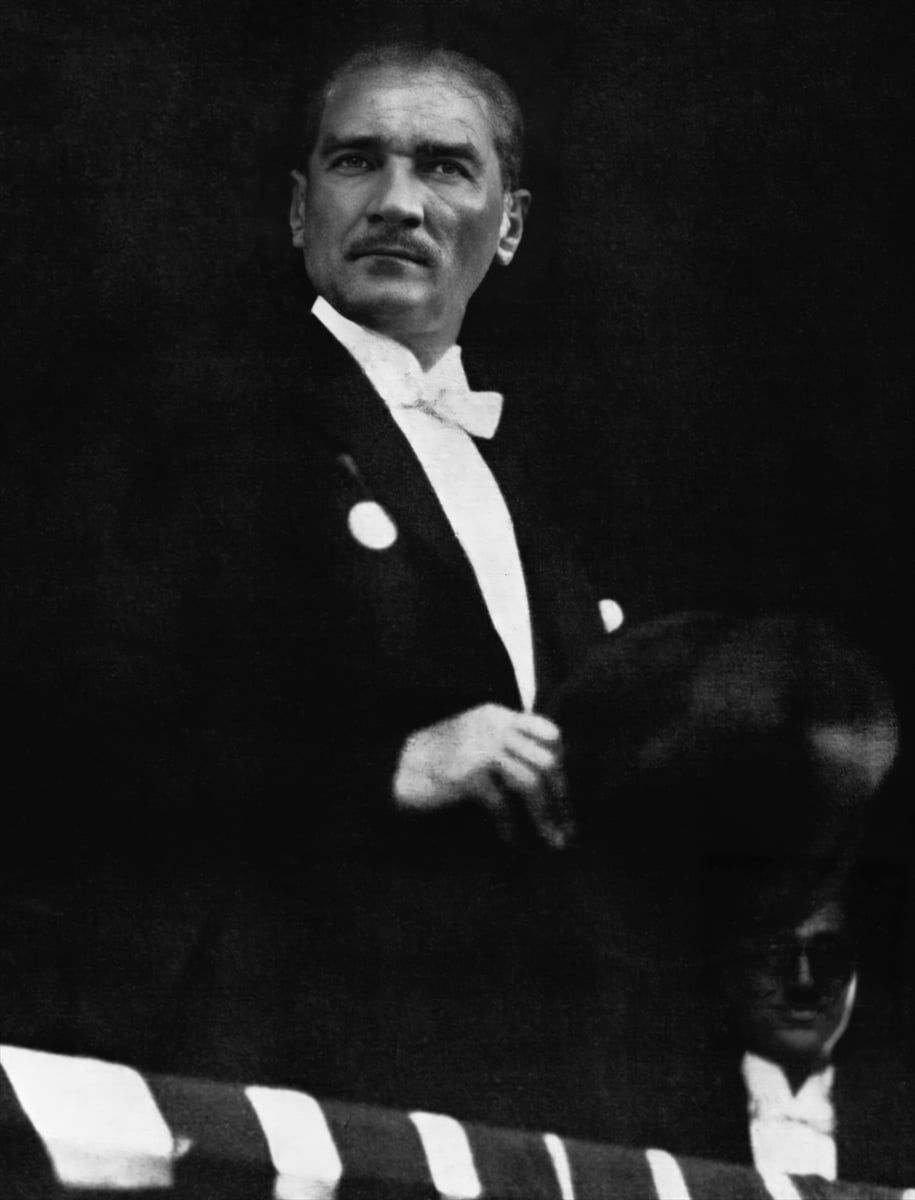
Mustafa Kemal during the Republic Day celebrations on the second anniversary of the Turkish Republic, 29 October 1925

The abolition of the caliphate and other cultural reforms were met with fierce opposition. The conservative elements were not appreciative, and they launched attacks on the Kemalist reformists. This was an important dimension in Mustafa Kemal's drive to reform the political system and to promote national sovereignty. By the consensus of the Muslim majority in early centuries, the caliphate was the core political concept of Sunni Islam. Abolishing the sultanate was easier because the survival of the caliphate at the time satisfied the partisans of the sultanate. This produced a split system with the new republic on one side and an Islamic form of government with the Caliph on the other side, and Mustafa Kemal and İnönü worried that "it nourished the expectations that the sovereign would return under the guise of Caliph." Caliph Abdülmecid II was elected after the abolition of the sultanate (1922).

The caliph had his own personal treasury and also had a personal service that included military personnel; Mustafa Kemal said that there was no "religious" or "political" justification for this. He believed that Caliph Abdülmecid II was following in the steps of the sultans in domestic and foreign affairs: accepting of and responding to foreign representatives and reserve officers, and participating in official ceremonies and celebrations. He wanted to integrate the powers of the caliphate into the powers of the GNA. His initial activities began on 1 January 1924, when İnönü, Çakmak, and Özalp consented to the abolition of the caliphate. The caliph made a statement to the effect that he would not interfere with political affairs. On 1 March 1924, at the Assembly, Mustafa Kemal said:

The religion of Islam will be elevated if it will cease to be a political instrument, as had been the case in the past.

On 3 March 1924, the caliphate was officially abolished and its powers within Turkey were transferred to the GNA. Other Muslim nations debated the validity of Turkey's unilateral abolition of the caliphate as they decided whether they should confirm the Turkish action or appoint a new caliph. A "Caliphate Conference" was held in Cairo in May 1926 and a resolution was passed declaring the caliphate "a necessity in Islam", but failed to implement this decision.

Two other Islamic conferences were held in Mecca (1926) and Jerusalem (1931), but failed to reach a consensus. Turkey did not accept the re-establishment of the caliphate and perceived it as an attack to its basic existence. Meanwhile, Mustafa Kemal and the reformists continued their own way.

On 8 April 1924, sharia courts were abolished with the law "Mehakim-i Şer'iyenin İlgasına ve Mehakim Teşkilatına Ait Ahkamı Muaddil Kanun".

==== Educational reform ====
The removal of the caliphate was followed by an extensive effort to establish the separation of governmental and religious affairs. Education was the cornerstone in this effort. In 1923, there were three main educational groups of institutions. The most common institutions were medreses based on Arabic, the Qur'an, and memorization. The second type of institution was idadî and sultanî, the reformist schools of the Tanzimat era. The last group included colleges and minority schools in foreign languages that used the latest teaching models in educating pupils. The old medrese education was modernized. Mustafa Kemal changed the classical Islamic education for a vigorously promoted reconstruction of educational institutions. He linked educational reform to the liberation of the nation from dogma, which he believed was more important than the Turkish War of Independence. He declared:

Today, our most important and most productive task is the national education [unification and modernization] affairs. We have to be successful in national education affairs and we shall be. The liberation of a nation is only achieved through this way."

In the summer of 1924, Mustafa Kemal invited American educational reformer John Dewey to Ankara to advise him on how to reform Turkish education. His public education reforms aimed to prepare citizens for roles in public life through increasing public literacy. He wanted to institute compulsory primary education for both girls and boys; since then this effort has been an ongoing task for the republic. He pointed out that one of the main targets of education in Turkey had to be raising a generation nourished with what he called the "public culture". The state schools established a common curriculum which became known as the "unification of education".

Unification of education was put into force on 3 March 1924 by the Law on Unification of Education (No. 430). With the new law, education became inclusive, organized on a model of the civil community. In this new design, all schools submitted their curriculum to the "Ministry of National Education", a government agency modeled after other countries' ministries of education. Concurrently, the republic abolished the two ministries and made clergy subordinate to the department of religious affairs, one of the foundations of secularism in Turkey. The unification of education under one curriculum ended "clerics or clergy of the Ottoman Empire", but was not the end of religious schools in Turkey; they were moved to higher education until later governments restored them to their former position in secondary after Mustafa Kemal's death.

==== Western attire ====
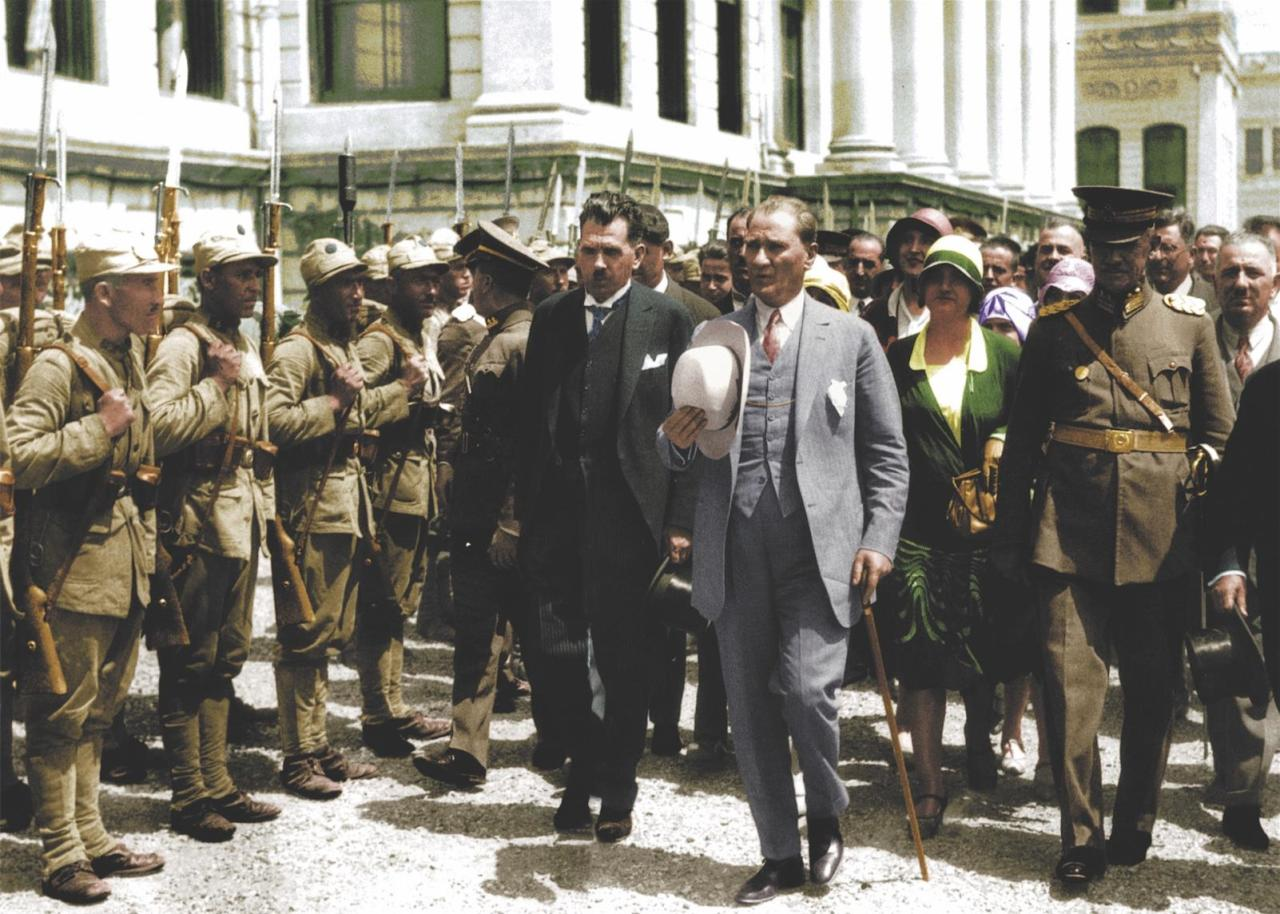
Colorized photograph of Mustafa Kemal with his Panama hat just after the Kastamonu speech in 1925

Beginning in the fall of 1925, Mustafa Kemal encouraged the Turks to wear modern European attire. He was determined to force the abandonment of the sartorial traditions of the Middle East and finalize a series of dress reforms, which were originally started by Mahmud II. The fez was established by Sultan Mahmud II in 1826 as part of the Ottoman Empire's modernization effort. The Hat Law of 1925 introduced the use of Western-style hats instead of the fez. Mustafa Kemal first made the hat compulsory for civil servants. The guidelines for the proper dressing of students and state employees were passed during his lifetime; many civil servants adopted the hat willingly. In 1925, Mustafa Kemal wore a Panama hat during a public appearance in Kastamonu, one of the most conservative towns in Anatolia, to explain that the hat was the headgear of civilized nations. The last part of reform on dress emphasized the need to wear modern Western suits with neckties as well as Fedora and Derby-style hats instead of antiquated religion-based clothing such as the veil and turban in the Law Relating to Prohibited Garments of 1934.

Even though he personally promoted modern dress for women, Mustafa Kemal never made specific reference to women's clothing in the law, as he believed that women would adapt to the new clothing styles of their own free will. He was frequently photographed on public business with his wife Lâtife Uşaklıgil, who covered her head in accordance with Islamic tradition. He was also frequently photographed on public business with women wearing modern Western clothes. But it was Mustafa Kemal's adopted daughters, Sabiha Gökçen and Afet İnan, who provided the real role model for the Turkish women of the future. He wrote: "The religious covering of women will not cause difficulty ... This simple style [of headcovering] is not in conflict with the morals and manners of our society."

==== Religious insignia ====
On 30 August 1925, Mustafa Kemal's view on religious insignia used outside places of worship was introduced in his Kastamonu speech. This speech also had another position. He said:

In the face of knowledge, science, and of the whole extent of radiant civilization, I cannot accept the presence in Turkey's civilized community of people primitive enough to seek material and spiritual benefits in the guidance of sheiks. The Turkish republic cannot be a country of sheiks, dervishes, and disciples. The best, the truest order is the order of civilization. To be a man it is enough to carry out the requirements of civilization. The leaders of dervish orders will understand the truth of my words, and will themselves close down their lodges [tekke] and admit that their disciplines have grown up.

On 2 September 1925, the government issued a decree closing down all Sufi orders, the tekkes and other religious ideological lodges. Mustafa Kemal ordered the dervish lodges to be converted to museums, such as Mevlana Museum in Konya. The institutional expression of religious ideologies became illegal in Turkey; a politically neutral form of any religious ideology, functioning as social associations, was permitted to exist.

==== Opposition to Mustafa Kemal in 1924–1927 ====
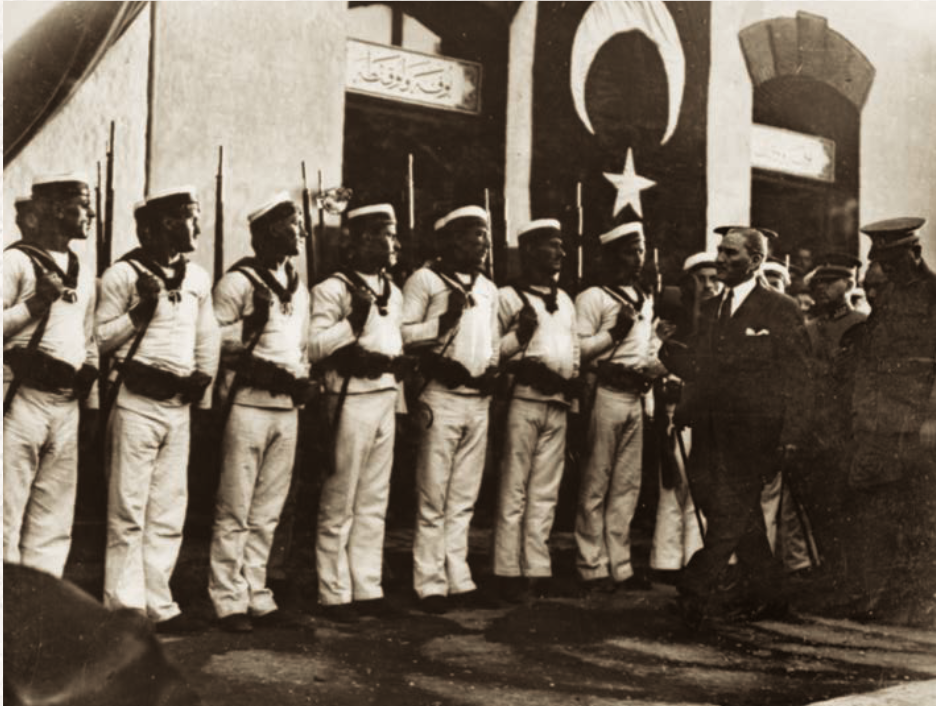
Mustafa Kemal is greeted by marines in Büyükada (14 July 1927)

In 1924, while the "Issue of Mosul" was on the table, Sheikh Said began to organize the Sheikh Said Rebellion. Sheikh Said was a wealthy Kurdish tribal chief of a local Naqshbandi order in Diyarbakır. He emphasized the issue of religion; he not only opposed the abolition of the caliphate, but also the adoption of civil codes based on Western models, the closure of religious orders, the ban on polygamy, and the new obligatory civil marriage. Sheikh stirred up his followers against the policies of the government, which he considered anti-Islamic. In an effort to restore Islamic law, Sheik's forces moved through the countryside, seized government offices and marched on the important cities of Elazığ and Diyarbakır. Members of the government saw the Sheikh Said Rebellion as an attempt at a counter-revolution. They urged immediate military action to prevent its spread. With the support of Mustafa Kemal, the acting prime minister Ali Fethi (Okyar) was replaced with İsmet Pasha (İnönü), who on 3 March 1925 ordered the invocation of the "Law for the Maintenance of Order" in order to deal with the rebellion. It gave the government exceptional powers and included the authority to shut down subversive groups. The law was repealed in March 1927.

There were also parliamentarians in the GNA who were not happy with these changes. So many members were denounced as opposition sympathizers at a private meeting of the Republican People's Party (CHP) that Mustafa Kemal expressed his fear of being among the minority in his own party. He decided not to purge this group. After a censure motion gave the chance to have a breakaway group, Kâzım Karabekir, along with his friends, established such a group on 17 October 1924. The censure became a confidence vote at the CHP for Mustafa Kemal. On 8 November, the motion was rejected by 148 votes to 18, and 41 votes were absent. The CHP held all but one seat in the parliament. After the majority of the CHP chose him, Mustafa Kemal said, "the Turkish nation is firmly determined to advance fearlessly on the path of the republic, civilization and progress".

On 17 November 1924, the breakaway group established the Progressive Republican Party (PRP) with 29 deputies and the first multi-party system began. Some of Mustafa Kemal's closest associates who had supported him in the early days of the War of Independence such as Rauf Bey (later Rauf Orbay), Refet Pasha, and Ali Fuat Pasha (later Ali Fuat Cebesoy) were among the members of the new party. The PRP's economic program suggested liberalism, in contrast to the statism of the CHP, and its social program was based on conservatism in contrast to the modernism of the CHP. Leaders of the party strongly supported the Kemalist revolution in principle, but had different opinions on the cultural revolution and the principle of secularism. The PRP was not against Mustafa Kemal's main positions as declared in its program; they supported establishing secularism in the country and the civil law, or as stated, "the needs of the age" (article 3) and the uniform system of education (article 49). These principles were set by the leaders at the onset. The only legal opposition became a home for all kinds of differing views.

During 1926, a plot to assassinate Mustafa Kemal was uncovered in Smyrna (İzmir). It originated with a former deputy who had opposed the abolition of the caliphate. What originally was an inquiry into the planners shifted to a sweeping investigation. Ostensibly, its aims were to uncover subversive activities, but in truth, the investigation was used to undermine those disagreeing with Mustafa Kemal's cultural reforms. The investigation brought a number of political activists before the tribunal, including Karabekir, the leader of the PRP. A number of surviving leaders of the Committee of Union and Progress, including Mehmet Cavid, Ahmed Şükrü, and İsmail Canbulat, were found guilty of treason and hanged. Because the investigation found a link between the members of the PRP and the Sheikh Said Rebellion, the PRP was dissolved following the outcomes of the trial. The pattern of organized opposition was broken; this action was to be the only broad political purge during Mustafa Kemal's presidency. His statement – "My mortal body will turn into dust, but the Republic of Turkey will last forever" – was regarded as a will after the assassination attempt.

==== Modernization efforts, 1926–1930 ====
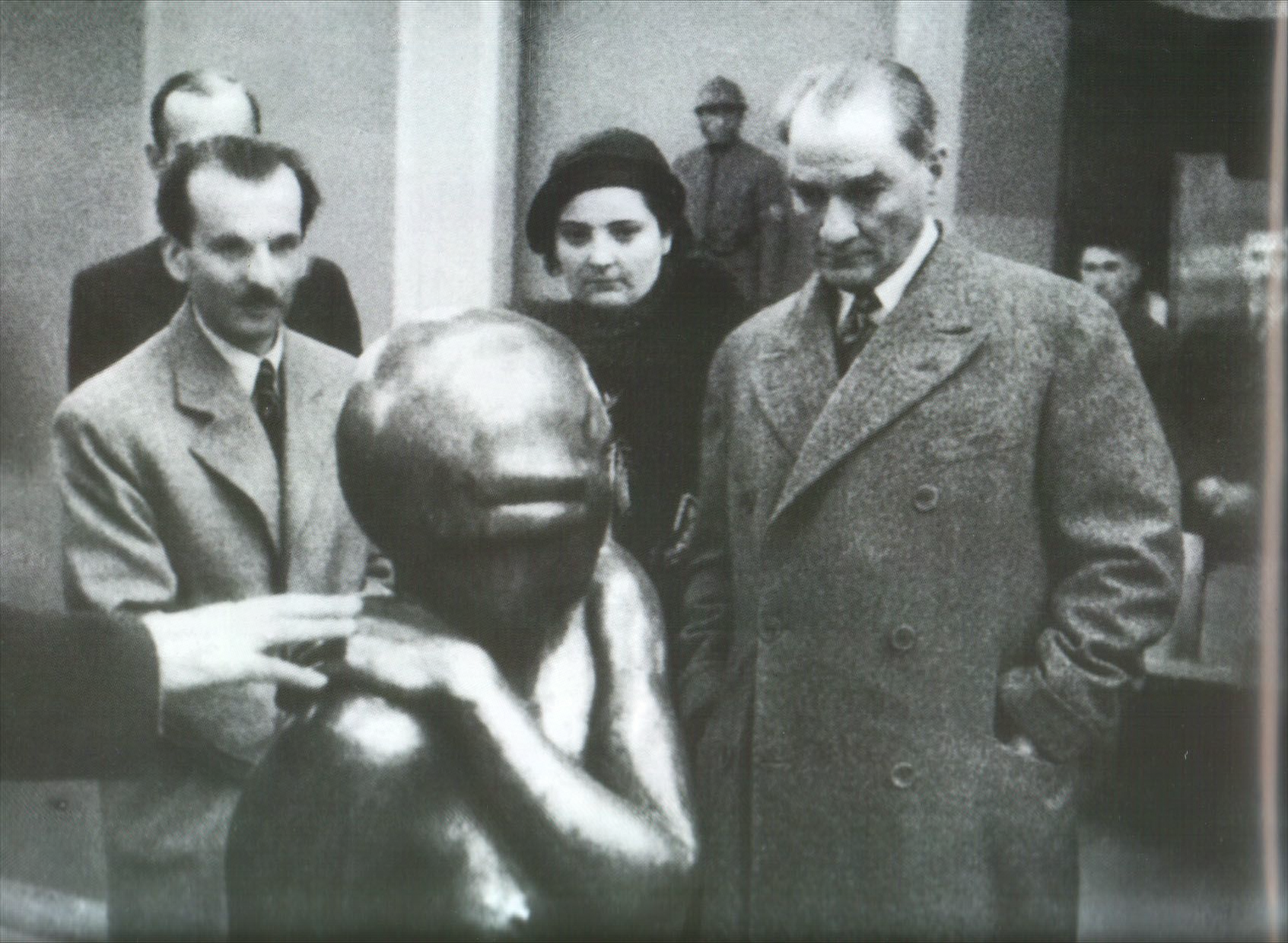
Mustafa Kemal at the 1927 opening of the State Art and Sculpture Museum

In the years following 1926, Mustafa Kemal introduced a radical departure from previous reformations established by the Ottoman Empire. For the first time in history, Islamic law was separated from secular law and restricted to matters of religion. He stated:

We must liberate our concepts of justice, our laws and our legal institutions from the bonds which, even though they are incompatible with the needs of our century, still hold a tight grip on us.

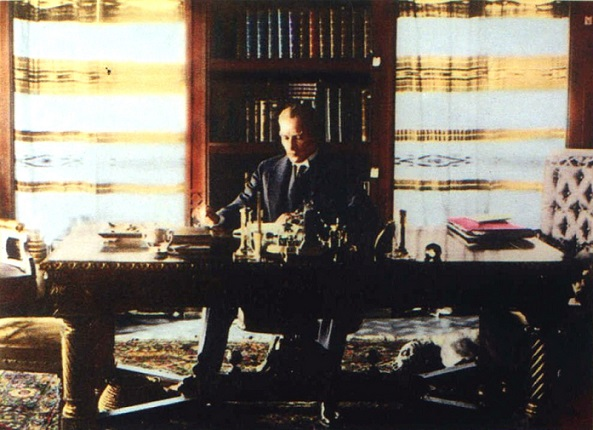
Mustafa Kemal at the library of the Çankaya Presidential Residence in Ankara, on 16 July 1929

On 1 March 1926, the Turkish penal code, modelled after the Italian penal code, was passed. On 4 October 1926, Islamic courts were closed. Establishing the civic law needed time, so Mustafa Kemal delayed the inclusion of the principle of laïcité (the constitutional principle of secularism in France) until 5 February 1937.

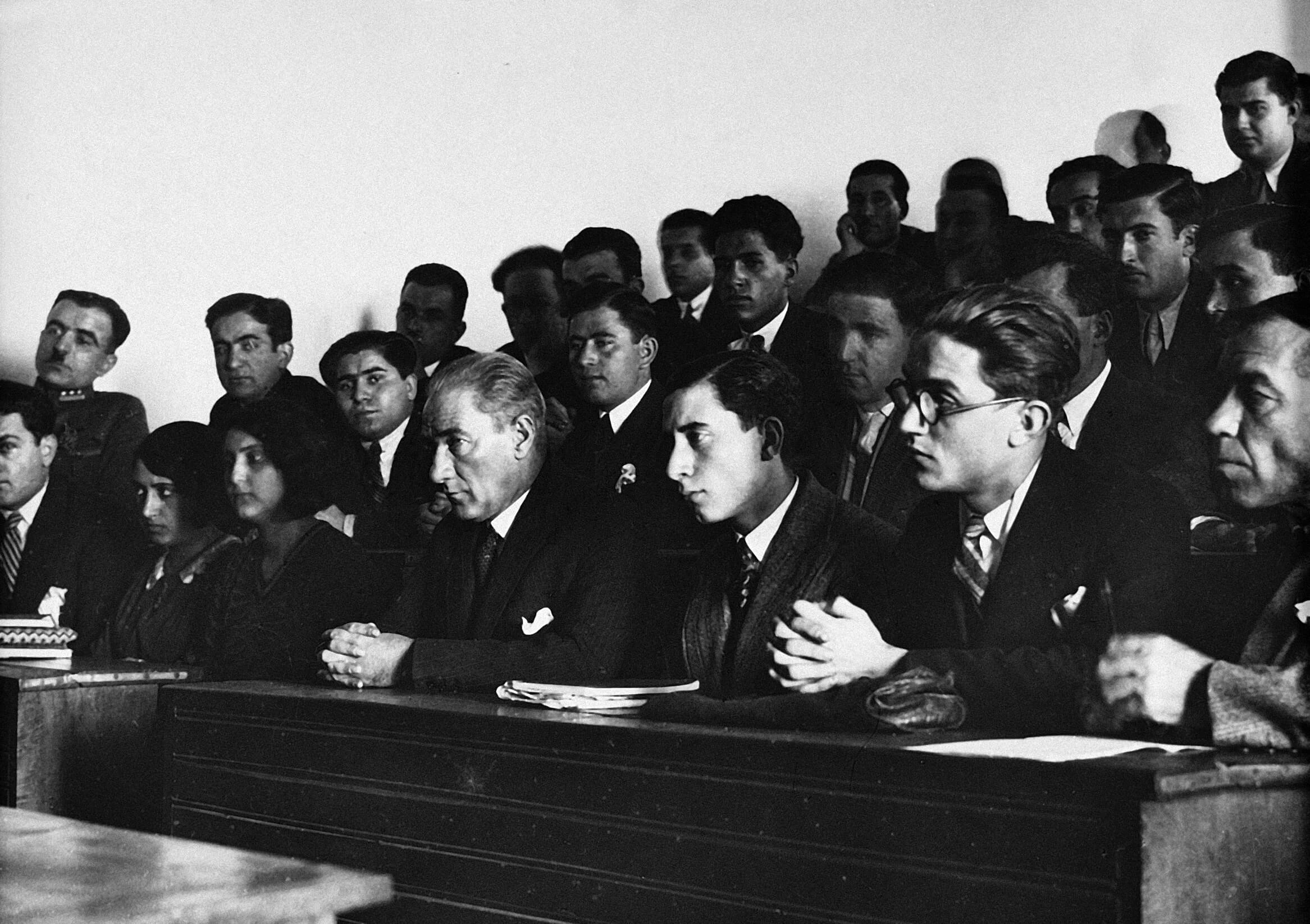
Mustafa Kemal attending a class at the Law School of the Istanbul House of Multiple Sciences in 1930

In keeping with the Islamic practice of sex segregation, Ottoman practice discouraged social interaction between men and women. Mustafa Kemal began developing social reforms to address this issue very early, as was evident in his personal journal. He and his staff discussed issues such as abolishing the veiling of women and integrating women into the outside world. His plans to surmount the task were written in his journal in November 1915:

The social change can come by (1) educating capable mothers who are knowledgeable about life; (2) giving freedom to women; (3) a man can change his morals, thoughts, and feelings by leading a common life with a woman; as there is an inborn tendency towards the attraction of mutual affection.

Mustafa Kemal needed a new civil code to establish his second major step of giving freedom to women. The first part was the education of girls, a feat established with the unification of education. On 4 October 1926, the new Turkish civil code, modelled after the Swiss civil code, was passed. Under the new code, women gained equality with men in such matters as inheritance and divorce, since Mustafa Kemal did not consider gender a factor in social organization. According to his view, society marched towards its goal with men and women united. He believed that it was scientifically impossible for Turkey to achieve progress and become civilized if Ottoman gender separation persisted. During a meeting he declaimed:

To the women: Win for us the battle of education and you will do yet more for your country than we have been able to do. It is to you that I appeal.
To the men: If henceforward the women do not share in the social life of the nation, we shall never attain to our full development. We shall remain irremediably backward, incapable of treating on equal terms with the civilizations of the West.

Additionally, the Kemalist one-party period of Turkey's labor participation rate was as high as 70%. The participation rate continued to decline after the democratization of Turkey due to the backlash of conservative norms in Turkish society.

In 1927, the State Art and Sculpture Museum (Ankara Resim ve Heykel Müzesi) opened its doors. The museum highlighted sculpture, which was rarely practised in Turkey due to the Islamic tradition of avoiding idolatry. Mustafa Kemal believed that "culture is the foundation of the Turkish Republic", and described modern Turkey's ideological thrust as "a creation of patriotism blended with a lofty humanist ideal". He included both his own nation's creative legacy and what he saw as the admirable values of global civilization. The pre-Islamic culture of the Turks became the subject of extensive research, and particular emphasis was placed on the widespread Turkish culture before the Seljuk and Ottoman civilizations. He instigated study of Anatolian civilizations – Phrygians, Lydians, Sumerians, and Hittites. To attract public attention to past cultures, he personally named the banks "Sümerbank" (1932) after the Sumerians and "Etibank" (1935) after the Hittites. He also stressed the folk arts of the countryside as a wellspring of Turkish creativity.

At the time, the republic used the Ottoman Turkish language written in the Arabic script with Arabic and Persian loan vocabulary. However, as little as 10% of the population was literate. Furthermore, the American reformer John Dewey, invited by Mustafa Kemal to assist in educational reform, found that learning how to read and write Turkish in the traditional Arabic script took roughly three years. In the spring of 1928, Mustafa Kemal met in Ankara with several linguists and professors from all over Turkey to unveil his plan to implement a new alphabet for the written Turkish language, based on the Latin script. The new Turkish alphabet would serve as a replacement for the old Arabic script and a solution to the literacy problem, since the new alphabet did not retain the complexities of the Arabic script and could be learned within a few months. When Mustafa Kemal asked the language experts how long it would take to implement the new alphabet into the Turkish language, most of the professors and linguists said between three and five years. Mustafa Kemal was said to have scoffed and openly stated: "We shall do it in three to five months".

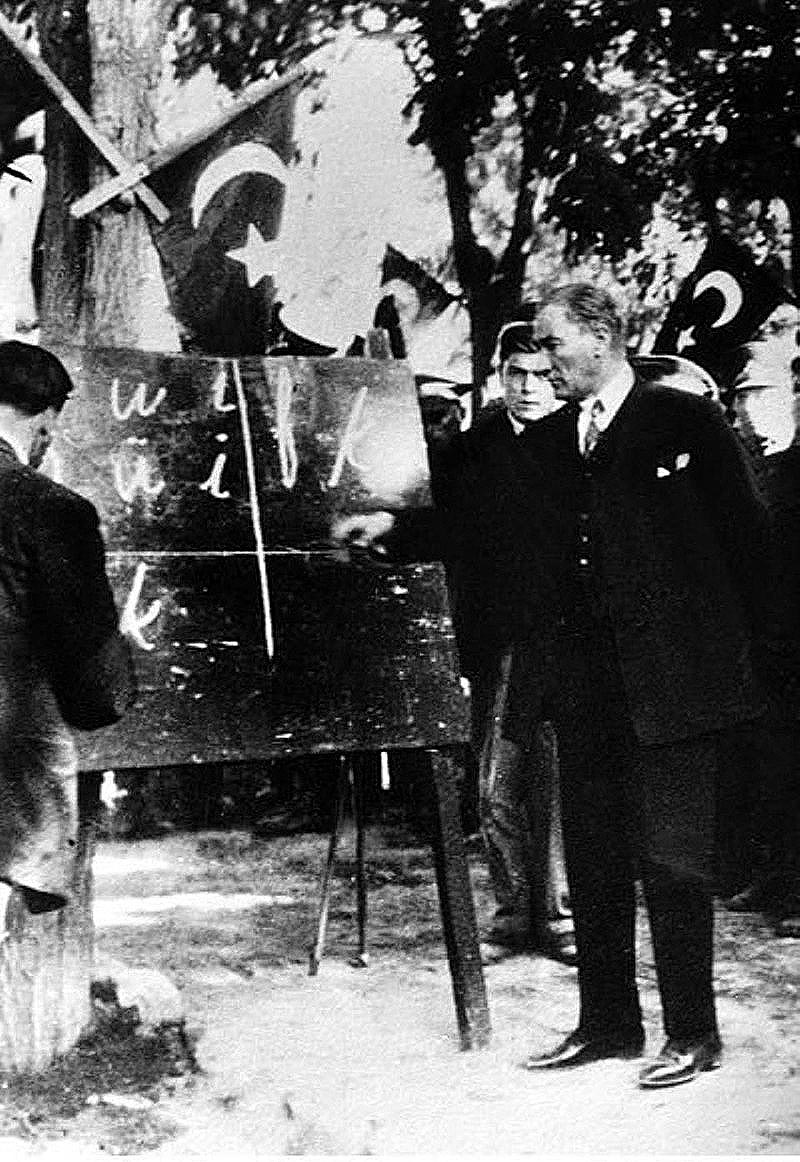
Mustafa Kemal introducing the new Turkish alphabet to the people of Kayseri on 20 September 1928

Over the next several months, Mustafa Kemal pressed for the introduction of the new Turkish alphabet and made public announcements of the upcoming overhaul. The creation of the alphabet was undertaken by the Language Commission (Dil Encümeni) with the initiative of Mustafa Kemal. On 1 November 1928, he introduced the new Turkish alphabet and abolished the use of the Arabic script. The first Turkish newspaper using the new alphabet was published on 15 December 1928. Mustafa Kemal himself travelled the countryside in order to teach citizens the new alphabet. After vigorous campaigns, the literacy rate more than doubled from 10.6% in 1927 to 22.4% in 1940. To supplement the literacy reform, a number of congresses were organized on scientific issues, education, history, economics, arts and language. Libraries were systematically developed, and mobile libraries and book transport systems were set up to serve remote districts. Literacy reform was also supported by strengthening the private publishing sector with a new law on copyrights.

Mustafa Kemal promoted modern teaching methods at the primary education level, and Dewey proved integral to the effort. Dewey presented a paradigmatic set of recommendations designed for developing societies moving towards modernity in his "Report and Recommendation for the Turkish educational system". He was interested in adult education with the goal of forming a skill base in the country. Turkish women were taught not only child care, dress-making, and household management but also skills necessary for joining the economy outside the home. Mustafa Kemal's unified education program became a state-supervised system, which was designed to create a skill base for the social and economic progress of the country by educating responsible citizens as well as useful and appreciated members of society. In addition, Turkish education became an integrative system, aimed to alleviate poverty and used female education to establish gender equality. Mustafa Kemal himself put special emphasis on the education of girls and supported coeducation, introducing it at university level in 1923–24 and establishing it as the norm throughout the educational system by 1927. Mustafa Kemal's reforms on education made it significantly more accessible: between 1923 and 1938, the number of students attending primary schools increased by 224% (from 342,000 to 765,000), the number of students attending middle schools increased by 12.5 times (from around 6,000 to 74,000), and the number of students attending high schools increased by almost 17 times (from 1,200 to 21,000).

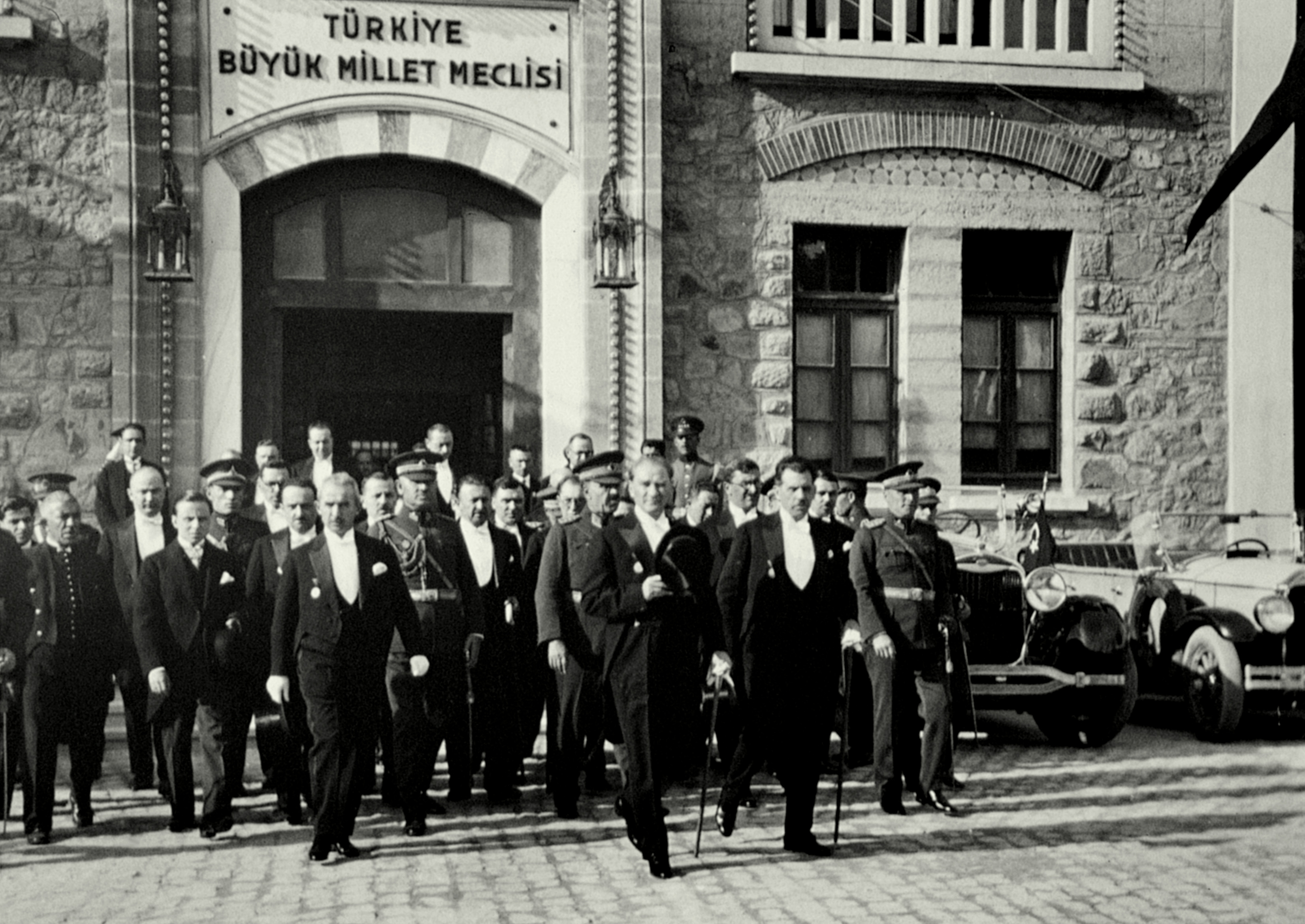
In 1930, leaving the parliament after the 7th-year celebration meeting

Mustafa Kemal generated media attention to propagate modern education during this period. He instigated official education meetings called "Science Boards" and "Education Summits" to discuss the quality of education, training issues, and certain basic educational principles. He said, "our [schools' curriculum] should aim to provide opportunities for all pupils to learn and to achieve." He was personally engaged with the development of two textbooks. The first one, Vatandaş İçin Medeni Bilgiler (Civic knowledge for the citizens, 1930), introduced the science of comparative government and explained the means of administering public trust by explaining the rules of governance as applied to the new state institutions. The second, Geometri (Geometry, 1937), was a text for high schools and introduced many of the terms currently used in Turkey to describe geometry.

==== Opposition to Mustafa Kemal in 1930–1931 ====
On 11 August 1930, Mustafa Kemal decided to try a multiparty movement once again and asked Fethi Okyar to establish a new party. Mustafa Kemal insisted on the protection of secular reforms. The brand-new Liberal Republican Party succeeded all around the country. However, without the establishment of a real political spectrum, the party became the center to opposition of Mustafa Kemal's reforms, particularly in regard to the role of religion in public life. On 23 December 1930, a chain of violent incidents occurred, instigated by the rebellion of Islamic fundamentalists in Menemen, a small town in the Aegean Region. The Menemen Incident came to be considered a serious threat against secular reforms.

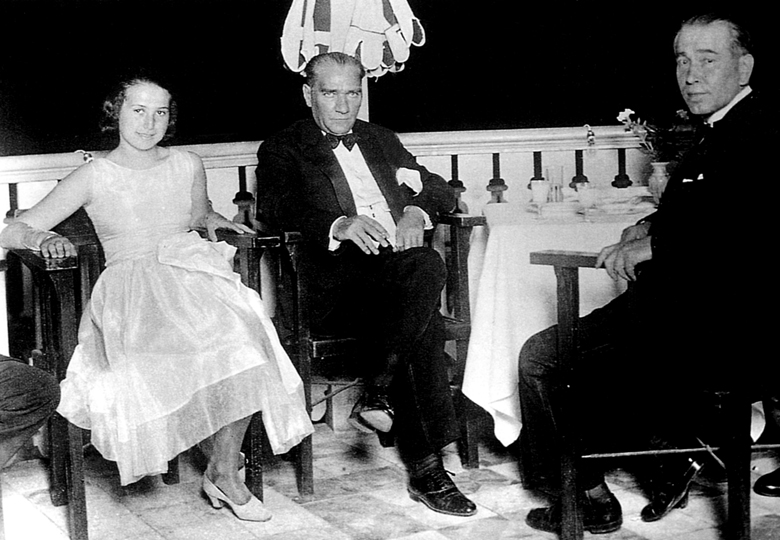
Mustafa Kemal with the Liberal Republican Party leader Fethi Okyar and his daughter in Yalova, on 13 August 1930

In November 1930, Ali Fethi Okyar dissolved his own party. A more lasting multi-party period of the Republic of Turkey began in 1945. In 1950, the CHP ceded the majority position to the Democratic Party. This came amidst arguments that Mustafa Kemal's single-party rule did not promote direct democracy. The reason experiments with pluralism failed during this period was that not all groups in the country had agreed to a minimal consensus regarding shared values (mainly secularism) and shared rules for conflict resolution. In response to such criticisms, Mustafa Kemal's biographer Andrew Mango writes: "between the two wars, democracy could not be sustained in many relatively richer and better-educated societies. Mustafa Kemal's enlightened authoritarianism left a reasonable space for free private lives. More could not have been expected in his lifetime." Even though, at times, he did not appear to be a democrat in his actions, Mustafa Kemal always supported the idea of building a civil society: a system of voluntary civic and social organizations and institutions as opposed to the force-backed structures of the state. In one of his many speeches about the importance of democracy, Mustafa Kemal said in 1933:

Republic means the democratic administration of the state. We founded the Republic, reaching its tenth year. It should enforce all the requirements of democracy as the time comes.

==== Modernization efforts, 1931–1938 ====
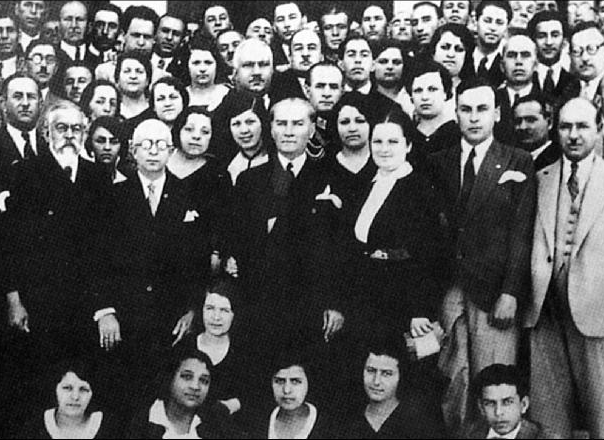
In 1931, during the establishment ceremony of the Turkish History Institution. Atatürk is standing with Afet İnan (on his left) and Yusuf Akçura (first from the left).

In 1931, Atatürk established the Turkish Language Association (Türk Dil Kurumu) for conducting research works in the Turkish language. The Turkish Historical Society (Türk Tarih Kurumu) was established in 1931, and began maintaining archives in 1932 for conducting research works on the history of Turkey. On 1 January 1928, he established the Turkish Education Association, which supported intelligent and hard-working children in financial need, as well as material and scientific contributions to the educational life. In 1933, Atatürk ordered the reorganization of Istanbul University into a modern institution and later established Ankara University in the capital city.

Atatürk dealt with the translation of scientific terminology into Turkish. He wanted the Turkish language reform to be methodologically based. Any attempt to "cleanse" the Turkish language of foreign influence without modelling the integral structure of the language was inherently wrong to him. He personally oversaw the development of the Sun Language Theory (Güneş Dil Teorisi), which was a linguistic theory which proposed that all human languages were descendants of one Central Asian primal language. His ideas could be traced to the work by the French scientist Hilaire de Barenton titled L'Origine des Langues, des Religions et des Peuples, which postulates that all languages originated from hieroglyphs and cuneiform used by Sumerians, and the paper by Austrian linguist Hermann F. Kvergić of Vienna titled "La psychologie de quelques éléments des langues Turques" ('The Psychology of Some Elements of the Turkic Languages'). Atatürk formally introduced the Sun Language Theory into Turkish political and educational circles in 1935, although he did later correct the more extremist practices.

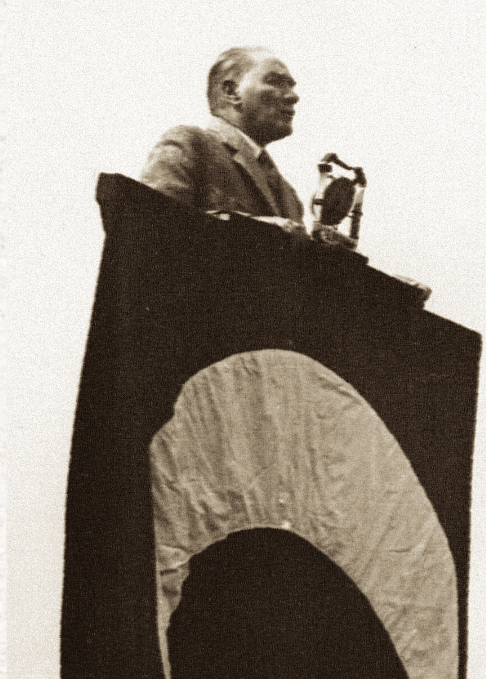
Atatürk at the opening of the Türkkuşu flight school in Etimesgut on 3 May 1935

Saffet Arıkan, a politician who was the head of the Turkish Language Association, said "Ulu Önderimiz Ata Türk Mustafa Kemal" ('Our Great Leader Ata Türk Mustafa Kemal') in the opening speech of the 2nd Language Day on 26 September 1934. Later, the surname "Atatürk" (which derived from the title Atabey in Turkic history, however, commonly translated as 'father of the Turks' or 'Turk like his ancestors') was accepted as the surname of Mustafa Kemal after the adoption of the Surname Law in 1934.

Beginning in 1932, several hundred "People's Houses" (Halkevleri) and "People's Rooms" (Halkodaları) across the country allowed greater access to a wide variety of artistic activities, sports, and other cultural events. Atatürk supported and encouraged the visual and the plastic arts, which had been suppressed by Ottoman leaders, who regarded depiction of the human form as idolatry. Many museums opened, architecture began to follow modern trends, and classical Western music, opera, ballet, and theatre took greater hold in the country. Book and magazine publications increased as well, and the film industry began to grow.

Almost all Qur'ans in Turkey before the 1930s were printed in Old Arabic. However, in 1924, three Turkish translations of the Qur'an were published in Istanbul, and several renderings of the Qur'an in the Turkish language were read in front of the public, creating significant controversy. These Turkish Qur'ans were fiercely opposed by members of the religious community, and the incident impelled many leading Muslim modernists to call upon the Turkish Parliament to sponsor a Qur'an translation of suitable quality. With the support of Atatürk, the Parliament approved the project and the Directorate of Religious Affairs appointed Mehmet Akif (Ersoy) to compose a Qur'an translation, and the Islamic scholar Elmalılı Hamdi Yazır to author a Turkish language Qur'anic commentary (tafsir) titled Hak Dini Kur'an Dili (The Qur'an: the Tongue of the Religion of Truth). However, it was only in 1935 that the version of Yazır's work read in public found its way to print. In 1932, Atatürk justified the translation of the Qur'an by stating how he wanted to "teach religion in Turkish to Turkish people who had been practising Islam without understanding it for centuries." Atatürk believed that the understanding of religion and its texts was too important to be left to a small group of people. Thus, his objective was to make the Qur'an accessible to a broader demographic by translating it into modern languages.

In 1934, Atatürk commissioned the first Turkish operatic work, Özsoy. The opera, staged at the People's House in Ankara, was composed by Adnan Saygun and performed by soprano Semiha Berksoy.

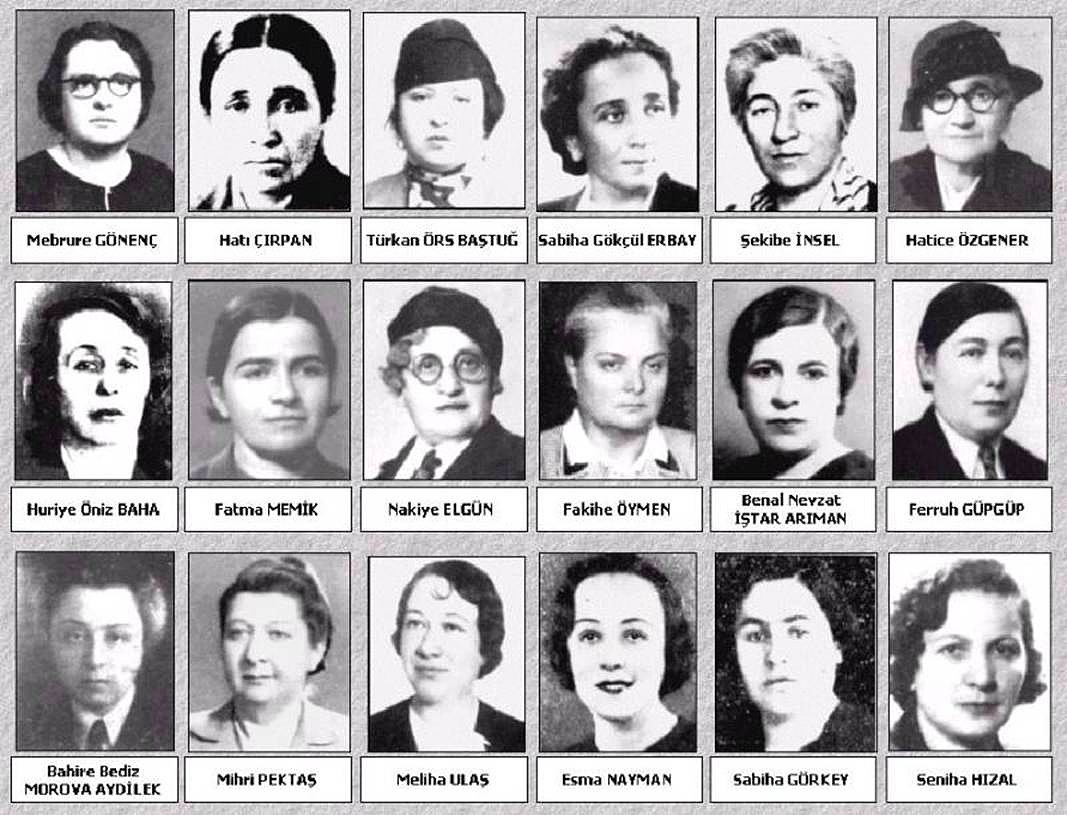
Eighteen female MPs joined the Turkish Parliament with the 1935 general elections.

On 5 December 1934, Turkey moved to grant full political rights to women. The equal rights of women in marriage had already been established in the earlier Turkish civil code. The role of women in Atatürk's cultural reforms was expressed in the civic book prepared under his supervision. In it, he stated:

There is no logical explanation for the political disenfranchisement of women. Any hesitation and negative mentality on this subject is nothing more than a fading social phenomenon of the past. ...Women must have the right to vote and to be elected; because democracy dictates that, because there are interests that women must defend, and because there are social duties that women must perform.

The 1935 general elections yielded 18 female MPs out of a total of 395 representatives, compared to nine out of 615 members in the British House of Commons and six out of 435 in the US House of Representatives inaugurated that year.

==== Unification and nationalisation efforts ====
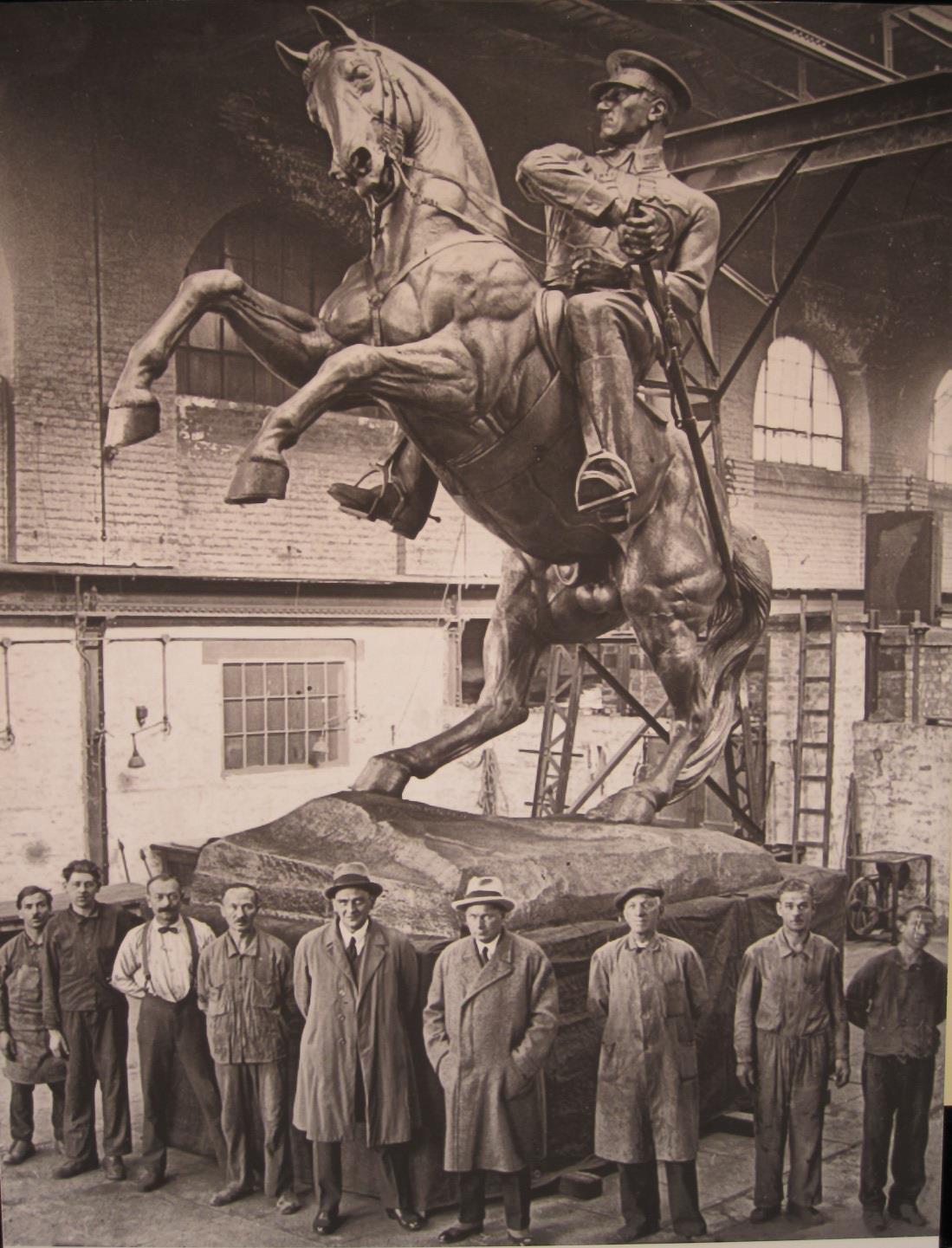
Statue of Atatürk in Samsun

When the modern Republic of Turkey was founded in 1923, nationalism and secularism were two of the founding principles. Atatürk aimed to create a nation state (ulus devlet) from the Turkish remnants of the Ottoman Empire. Kemalism defines the "Turkish People" as "those who protect and promote the moral, spiritual, cultural and humanistic values of the Turkish Nation." One of the goals of the establishment of the new Turkish state was to ensure "the domination of Turkish national identity in every aspect of social life from the language that people speak in the streets to the language to be taught at schools, from the education to the industrial life, from the trade to the cadres of state officials, from the civil law to the settlement of citizens to particular regions." The process of unification through Turkification continued and was fostered under Atatürk's government with such policies as Citizen speak Turkish! (Vatandaş Türkçe konuş!), an initiative created in the 1930s by law students but sponsored by the government. This campaign aimed to put pressure on non-Turkish speakers to speak Turkish in public. However, the campaign went beyond the measures of a mere policy of speaking Turkish to an outright prevention of any other language.

Another example of nationalisation was the Surname Law, which obligated the Turkish people to adopt fixed, hereditary surnames and forbade names that contained connotations of foreign cultures, nations, tribes, and religions. As a result, many ethnic Armenians, Greeks, and Kurds changed their surnames. Non-Turkish surnames ending with "yan, of, ef, viç, is, dis, poulos, aki, zade, shvili, madumu, veled, bin" could not be registered and were replaced by "-oğlu". Furthermore, the geographical name changes initiative by the Turkish government replaced non-Turkish geographical and topographic names within the Turkish Republic with Turkish names. The main proponent of the initiative had been a Turkish homogenization social-engineering campaign which aimed to assimilate geographical or topographical names that were deemed foreign and divisive against Turkish unity. The names that were considered foreign were usually of Armenian, Greek, Laz, Bulgarian, Kurdish, Assyrian, or Arabic origin.

The 1934 Resettlement Law was a policy adopted by the Turkish government which set forth the basic principles of immigration. The law, however, is regarded by some as a policy of assimilation of non-Turkish minorities through a forced and collective resettlement.

==== Social policy reforms and economic progress ====
Atatürk was also credited for his transformational change in Turkish agriculture and ecological development. The Kemalist government planted four million trees, modernized the Turkish agricultural mechanism, implemented flood controls, opened schools in rural areas with rural institutions such as agricultural banks, and implemented land reform that removed heavy taxes on peasants of the Ottoman era. He was described as the "Father of Turkish Agriculture". Atatürk also massively boomed the Turkish economy with heavy industrial production increased by 150% and GDP per capita rose from 800 USD to around 2000 USD by late 1930s, on par with Japan.

Atatürk's regime also passed the 1936 Labor Law, which gave substantial wage increases and improved the working conditions of workers in Turkish enterprises.

=== Foreign policies ===
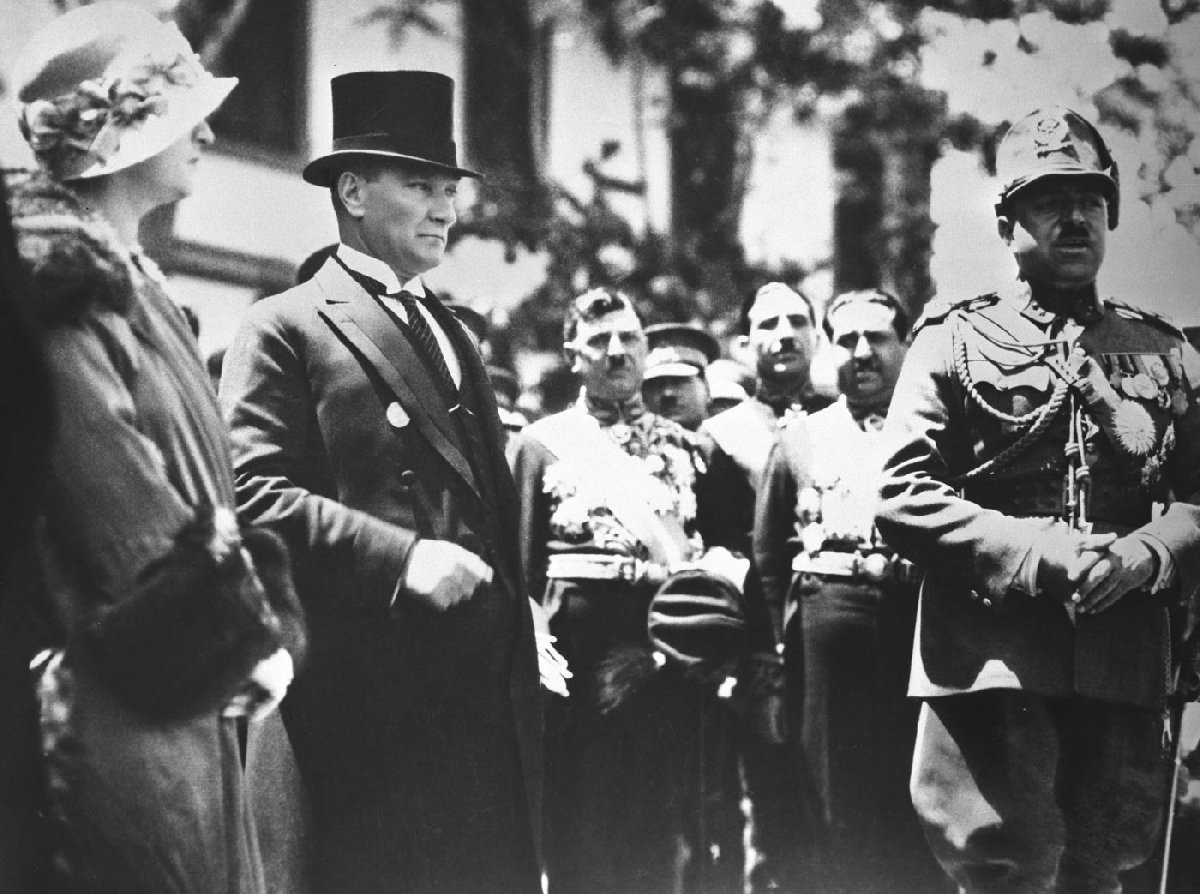
Atatürk with King Amanullah Khan of Afghanistan in Ankara, 1928. King Amanullah attempted to emulate many of Atatürk's reforms in Afghanistan, but was overthrown.

Atatürk's foreign policy followed his motto "Peace at home, peace in the world", a perception of peace linked to his project of civilization and modernization. The outcomes of Atatürk's policies depended on the power of the parliamentary sovereignty established by the Republic. The Turkish War of Independence was the last time Atatürk used his military might in dealing with other countries. Foreign issues were resolved by peaceful methods during his presidency.

==== Issue of Mosul ====
The Issue of Mosul, a dispute with the United Kingdom over control of Mosul Vilayet, was one of the first foreign affairs-related controversies of the new Republic. During the Mesopotamian campaign, Lieutenant General William Marshall followed the British War Office's instruction that "every effort was to be made to score as heavily as possible on the Tigris before the whistle blew", capturing Mosul three days after the signature of the Armistice of Mudros (30 October 1918). In 1920, the Misak-ı Milli, which consolidated the "Turkish lands", declared that Mosul Vilayet was a part of the historic Turkish heartland. The British were in a precarious situation with the Issue of Mosul and were adopting almost equally desperate measures to protect their interests. For example, the Iraqi revolt against the British was suppressed by the RAF Iraq Command during the summer of 1920. From the British perspective, if Atatürk stabilized Turkey, he would then turn his attention to Mosul and penetrate Mesopotamia, where the native population would likely join his cause. Such an event would result in an insurgent and hostile Muslim nation in close proximity to British territory in India.

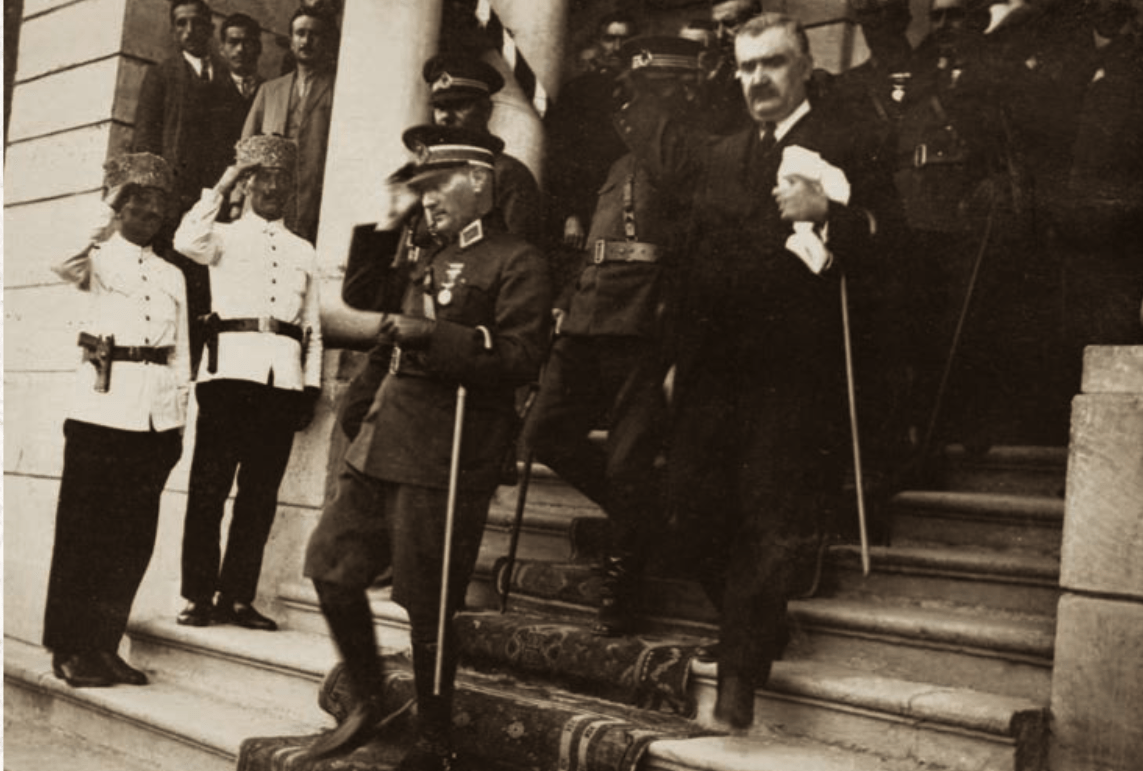
Atatürk in the days of the Mosul question, 1925

In 1923, Atatürk tried to persuade the GNA that accepting the arbitration of the League of Nations at the Treaty of Lausanne did not signify relinquishing Mosul, but rather waiting for a time when Turkey might be stronger. Nevertheless, the artificially drawn border had an unsettling effect on the population on both sides. Later, it was claimed that Turkey began where the oil ends, as the border was drawn by the British geophysicists based on locations of oil reserves. Atatürk did not want this separation. To address Atatürk's concerns, the British Foreign Secretary George Curzon attempted to disclaim the existence of oil in the Mosul area. On 23 January 1923, Curzon argued that the existence of oil was no more than hypothetical. However, according to the biographer H. C. Armstrong, "England wanted Mosul and its oil. The Kurds were the key to Mosul and the oil of Irak."

While three inspectors from the League of Nations Committee were sent to the region to oversee the situation in 1924, the Sheikh Said rebellion (1924–1927) set out to establish a new government positioned to cut Turkey's link to Mesopotamia. The relationship between the rebels and Britain was investigated. In fact, British assistance was sought after the rebels decided that the rebellion could not stand by itself.

In 1925, the League of Nations formed a three-member committee to study the case while the Sheikh Said Rebellion was on the rise. Partly because of the continuing uncertainties along the northern frontier (present-day northern Iraq), the committee recommended that the region should be connected to Iraq with the condition that the UK would hold the British Mandate of Mesopotamia. By the end of March 1925, the necessary troop movements were completed, and the whole area of the Sheikh Said rebellion was encircled. As a result of these manoeuvres, the revolt was put down. Britain, Iraq, and Atatürk made a treaty on 5 June 1926, which mostly followed the decisions of the League Council. The agreement left a large section of the Kurdish population and the Iraqi Turkmen on the non-Turkish side of the border.

==== Relations with the Russian SFSR/Soviet Union ====
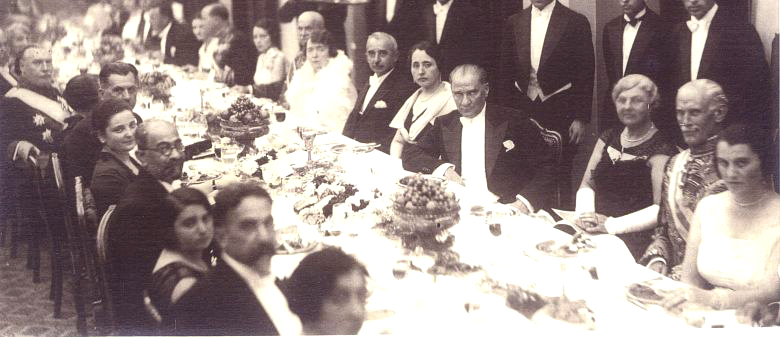
During a reception at the USSR Embassy in Ankara, on 7 November 1927

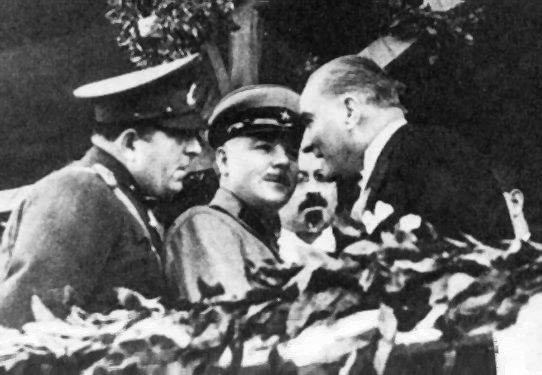
Exchanges on the concept of a Balkan Federation during the visit of Voroshilov, a vision of Atatürk's which was never achieved

In his 26 April 1920 message to Vladimir Lenin, the Bolshevik leader and head of the Russian SFSR's government, Atatürk promised to coordinate his military operations with the Bolsheviks' "fight against imperialist governments" and requested 5 million lira in gold as well as armaments "as first aid" to his forces. In 1920 alone, the Lenin government supplied the Kemalists with 6,000 rifles, over 5 million rifle cartridges, and 17,600 projectiles, as well as 200.6 kg of gold bullion. In the subsequent two years, the amount of aid increased.

In March 1921, the GNA representatives in Moscow signed the Treaty of Moscow ("Friendship and Brotherhood" Treaty) with Soviet Russia, which was a major diplomatic breakthrough for the Kemalists. The Treaty of Moscow, followed by the identical Treaty of Kars in October the same year, gave Turkey a favourable settlement of its north-eastern frontier at the expense of the Armenian Soviet Socialist Republic, then nominally an independent state.

Relations between the two countries were friendly but were based on the fact that they were against a common enemy: Britain and the West. In 1920, Atatürk toyed with the idea of using a state-controlled Turkish Communist Party to forestall the perceived spread of communist ideas in the country and gain access to the Comintern's financing.

Despite his relations with the Soviet Union, Atatürk was not willing to commit Turkey to communism. "Friendship with Russia", he said, "is not to adopt their ideology of communism for Turkey." Moreover, Atatürk declared, "Communism is a social issue. Social conditions, religion, and national traditions of our country confirm the opinion that Russian Communism is not applicable in Turkey." And in a speech on 1 November 1924, he said, "Our amicable relations with our old friend the Soviet Russian Republic are developing and progressing every day. As in past our Republican Government regards genuine and extensive good relations with Soviet Russia as the keystone of our foreign policy."

After the Turks withdrew their delegation from Geneva on 16 December 1925, they left the League of Nations Council to grant a mandate for the Mosul region to Britain without their consent. Atatürk countered by concluding a non-aggression pact with the USSR on 17 December. In 1935, the pact was prolonged for another 10 years.

In 1933, the Soviet Defence Minister Kliment Voroshilov visited Turkey and attended the tenth year celebrations of the Republic. Atatürk explained his position regarding the realization of his plan for a Balkan Federation economically uniting Turkey, Greece, Romania, Yugoslavia, and Bulgaria.

During the second half of the 1930s, Atatürk tried to establish a closer relationship with Britain and other major Western powers, which caused displeasure on the part of the Soviets. The second edition of the Great Soviet Encyclopedia (Volume 20, 1953) was unequivocally critical of Atatürk's policies in the last years of his rule, calling his domestic policies "anti-popular" and his foreign course as aimed at rapprochement with the "imperialist powers".

==== Turkish-Greek alliance ====
The post-war leader of Greece, Eleftherios Venizelos, was also determined to establish normal relations between his country and Turkey. The war had devastated Western Anatolia, and the financial burden of Ottoman Muslim refugees from Greece blocked rapprochement. Venizelos moved forward with an agreement with Turkey, despite accusations of conceding too much on the issues of naval armaments and the properties of Ottoman Greeks from Turkey. In spite of Turkish animosity against the Greeks, Atatürk resisted the pressures of historic enmities and was sensitive towards past tensions; at one point, he ordered the removal of a painting showing a Turkish soldier plunging his bayonet into a Greek soldier by stating, "What a revolting scene!"

Greece renounced all its claims over Turkish territory, and the two sides concluded an agreement on 30 April 1930. On 25 October, Venizelos visited Turkey and signed a treaty of friendship. Venizelos even forwarded Atatürk's name for the 1934 Nobel Peace Prize. Even after Venizelos' fall from power, Greco-Turkish relations remained cordial. Indeed, Venizelos' successor Panagis Tsaldaris came to visit Atatürk in September 1933 and signed a more comprehensive agreement called the Entente Cordiale between Greece and Turkey, which was a stepping stone for the Balkan Pact.

Greek Premier Ioannis Metaxas once stated, with regard to Atatürk, that "...Greece, which has the highest estimation of the renowned leader, heroic soldier, and enlightened creator of Turkey. We will never forget that President Atatürk was the true founder of the Turkish-Greek alliance based on a framework of common ideals and peaceful cooperation. He developed ties of friendship between the two nations which it would be unthinkable to dissolve. Greece will guard its fervent memories of this great man, who determined an unalterable future path for the noble Turkish nation."

==== Neighbours to the east ====
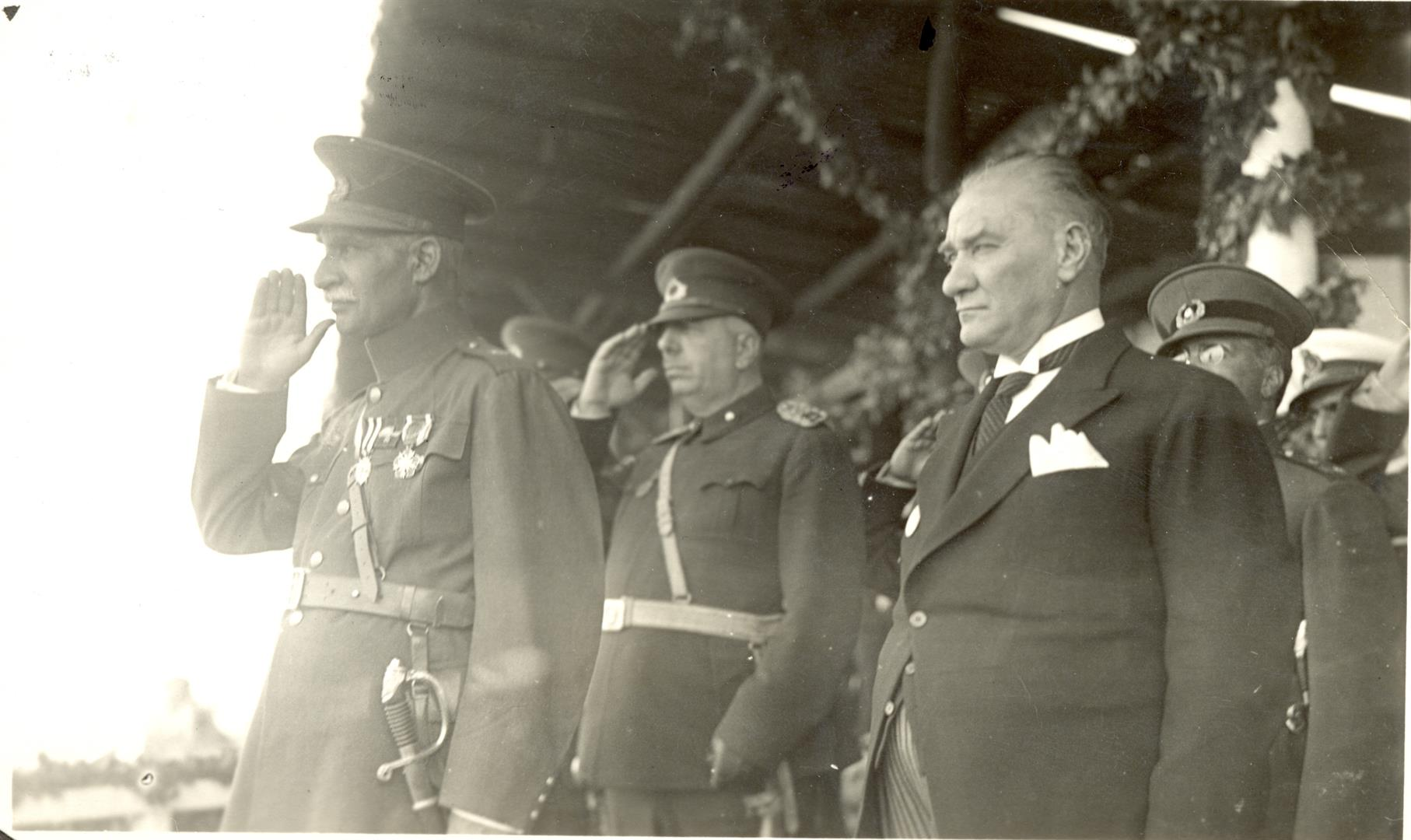
Atatürk (right) with Reza Shah Pahlavi (left) of Iran, during the Shah's visit to Turkey

From 1919, Afghanistan was in the midst of a reformation period under Amanullah Khan. Afghan Foreign Minister Mahmud Tarzi was a follower of Atatürk's domestic policy. Tarzi encouraged Amanullah Khan in social and political reform but urged that reforms should built on a strong government. During the late 1920s, Anglo-Afghan relations soured over British fears of an Afghan-Soviet friendship. On 20 May 1928, Anglo-Afghan politics gained a positive perspective, when Amanullah Khan and his wife, Queen Soraya Tarzi, were received by Atatürk in Istanbul. This meeting was followed by a Turkey-Afghanistan Friendship and Cooperation pact on 22 May 1928. Atatürk supported Afghanistan's integration into international organizations. In 1934, Afghanistan's relations with the international community improved significantly when it joined the League of Nations. Mahmud Tarzi received Atatürk's personal support until he died on 22 November 1933 in Istanbul.

Atatürk and Reza Shah, leader of Iran, had a common approach regarding British imperialism and its influence in their countries, resulting in a slow but continuous rapprochement between Ankara and Tehran. Both governments sent diplomatic missions and messages of friendship to each other during the Turkish War of Independence. The policy of the Ankara government in this period was to give moral support in order to reassure Iranian independence and territorial integrity. The relations between the two countries were strained after the abolishment of the caliphate. Iran's Shia clergy did not accept Atatürk's stance, and Iranian religious power centres perceived the real motive behind Atatürk's reforms was to undermine the power of the clergy. By the mid-1930s, Reza Shah's efforts had upset the clergy throughout Iran, thus widening the gap between religion and government. As Russia and Great Britain strengthened their holds in the Middle East, Atatürk feared the occupation and dismemberment of Iran as a multi-ethnic society by these European powers. Like Atatürk, Reza Shah wanted to secure Iran's borders, and in 1934, the Shah visited Atatürk.

In 1935, the draft of what would become the Treaty of Saadabad was paragraphed in Geneva, but its signing was delayed due to the border dispute between Iran and Iraq. On 8 July 1937, Turkey, Iraq, Iran, and Afghanistan signed the Saadabad Pact at Tehran. The signatories agreed to preserve their common frontiers, to consult together in all matters of common interest, and to commit no aggression against one another's territory. The treaty united the Afghan King Zahir Shah's call for greater Oriental-Middle Eastern cooperation, Reza Shah's goal in securing relations with Turkey that would help free Iran from Soviet and British influence, and Atatürk's foreign policy of ensuring stability in the region. The treaty's immediate outcome, however, was deterring Italian leader Benito Mussolini from interfering in the Middle East.

==== Turkish Straits ====
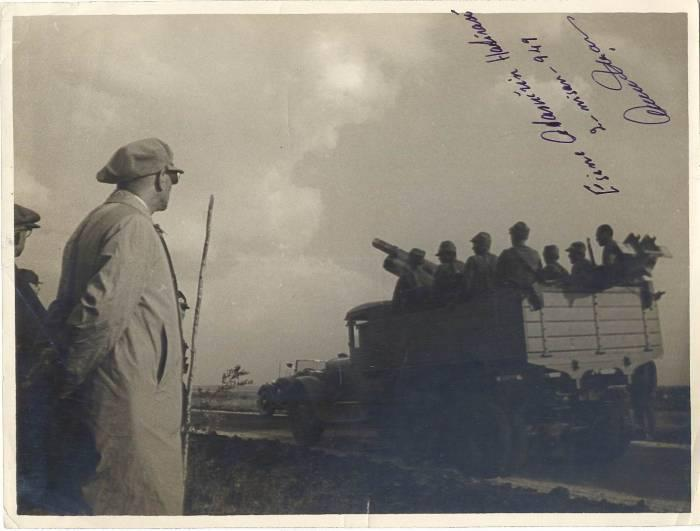
Atatürk observes the Turkish troops during the military exercise on 28 May 1936

On 24 July 1923, the Treaty of Lausanne included the Lausanne Straits Agreement. The Lausanne Straits Agreement stated that the Dardanelles should remain open to all commercial vessels: seizure of foreign military vessels was subject to certain limitations during peacetime, and, even as a neutral state, Turkey could not limit any military passage during wartime. The Lausanne Straits Agreement stated that the waterway was to be demilitarised and its management left to the Straits Commission. The demilitarised zone heavily restricted Turkey's domination and sovereignty over the Straits, and the defence of Istanbul was impossible without sovereignty over the water that passed through it.

In March 1936, Adolf Hitler's reoccupation of the Rhineland gave Atatürk the opportunity to resume full control over the Straits. "The situation in Europe", Atatürk declared "is highly appropriate for such a move. We shall certainly achieve it". Tevfik Rüştü Aras, Turkey's foreign minister, initiated a move to revise the Straits' regime. Aras claimed that he was directed by Atatürk, rather than the Prime Minister, İsmet İnönü. İnönü was worried about harming relations with Britain, France, and Balkan neighbors over the Straits. However, the signatories of the Treaty of Lausanne agreed to join the conference, since unlimited military passage had become unfavourable to Turkey with the changes in world politics. Atatürk demanded that the members of the Turkish Foreign Office devise a solution that would transfer full control of the waterway to Turkey.

On 20 July 1936, the Montreux Convention was signed by Bulgaria, Great Britain, Australia, France, Japan, Romania, the Soviet Union, Turkey, Yugoslavia, and Greece. It became the primary instrument governing the passage of commercial and war vessels through the Dardanelles Strait. The agreement was ratified by the GNAT on 31 July 1936 and went into effect on 9 November 1936.

==== Balkan Pact ====
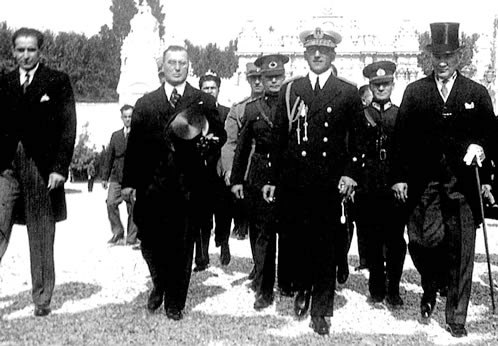
During the visit of King Alexander I of Yugoslavia in 1931

Until the early 1930s, Turkey followed a neutral foreign policy with the West by developing joint friendship and neutrality agreements. These bilateral agreements aligned with Atatürk's worldview. By the end of 1925, Turkey had signed fifteen joint agreements with Western states.

In the early 1930s, changes and developments in world politics required Turkey to make multilateral agreements to improve its security. Atatürk strongly believed that close cooperation between the Balkan states based on the principle of equality would have an important effect on European politics. These states had been ruled by the Ottoman Empire for centuries and had proved to be a powerful force. While the origins of the Balkan agreement may date as far back as 1925, the Balkan Pact came into being in the mid-1930s. Several important developments in Europe helped the original idea materialise, such as improvements in the Turkish-Greek alliance and the rapprochement between Bulgaria and Yugoslavia. The most important factor in driving Turkish foreign policy from the mid-1930s onwards was the fear of Italy. Benito Mussolini had frequently proclaimed his intention to place the entire Mediterranean under Italian control. Both the Turks and the various Balkan states felt threatened by Italian ambitions.

The Balkan Pact was negotiated by Atatürk with Greece, Romania, and Yugoslavia. This mutual-defence agreement intended to guarantee the signatories' territorial integrity and political independence against attack from another Balkan state such as Bulgaria or Albania. It countered the increasingly aggressive foreign policy of fascist Italy and the effect of a potential Bulgarian alignment with Nazi Germany. Atatürk thought of the Balkan Pact as a medium of balance in Turkey's relations with the European countries. He was particularly anxious to establish a region of security and alliances to the west of Turkey in Europe, which the Balkan Pact helped achieve.

The Balkan Pact provided for regular military and diplomatic consultations. The importance of the agreement is best seen in a message Atatürk sent to the Greek Premier Ioannis Metaxas:

The borders of the allies in the Balkan Pact are a single border. Those who covet this border will encounter the burning beams of the sun. I recommend avoiding this. The forces that defend our borders are a single and inseparable force.

The Balkan Pact was signed by the GNA on 28 February. The Greek and Yugoslav Parliaments ratified the agreement a few days later. The unanimously ratified Balkan pact was formally adopted on 18 May 1935 and lasted until 1940.

The Balkan Pact turned out to be ineffective for reasons that were beyond Atatürk's control. The pact failed when Bulgaria attempted to raise the Dobruja issue, only to end with the Italian invasion of Albania on 7 April 1939. These conflicts spread rapidly, eventually triggering World War II. The goal of Atatürk to protect southeast Europe failed with the dissolution of the pact. In 1938, the Turkish Army at peacetime strength consisted of 174,000 soldiers and 20,000 officers forming 11 army corps, 23 divisions, one armoured brigade, 3 cavalry brigades, and 7 frontier commands.

==== Issue of Hatay ====
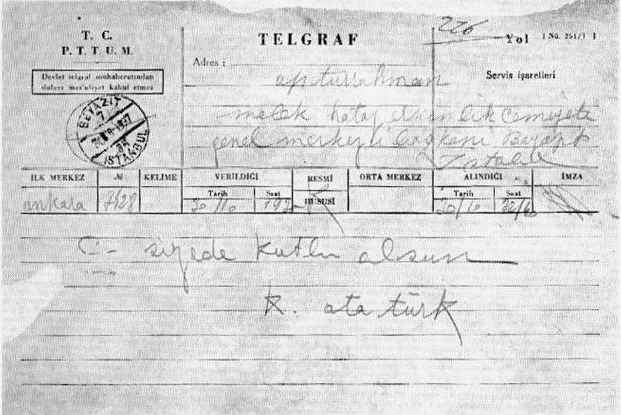
Telegram sent by Atatürk after the local legislative assembly accepted his proposal for the Hatay State's flag

During the second half of the 1930s, Atatürk tried to form a closer relationship with Britain. The risks of this policy change put the two men at odds. The Hatay issue and the Lyon agreement were two important developments in foreign policy that played a significant role in severing relations between Atatürk and İnönü.

In 1936, Atatürk raised the "Issue of Hatay" at the League of Nations. Hatay was based on the old administrative unit of the Ottoman Empire called the Sanjak of Alexandretta. On behalf of the League of Nations, the representatives of France, the United Kingdom, the Netherlands, Belgium, and Turkey prepared a constitution for Hatay, which established it as an autonomous sanjak within Syria. Despite some inter-ethnic violence, an election was conducted in 1938 by the local legislative assembly. The cities of Antakya (Antioch) and İskenderun (Alexandretta) joined Turkey in 1939.

=== Economic policies ===
Atatürk instigated economic policies to develop small and large scale businesses, but also to create social strata (i.e. industrial bourgeoisie coexisting with the peasantry of Anatolia) that were virtually non-existent during the Ottoman Empire. The primary problem faced by the politics of his period was the lag in the development of political institutions and social classes which would steer such social and economic changes. Atatürk's vision regarding early Turkish economic policy was apparent during the İzmir Economic Congress of 1923. The initial choices of Atatürk's economic policies reflected the realities of his time. After World War I, due to the lack of any real potential investors to fund private sector industry, Atatürk established many state-owned factories for agriculture, machinery, and textile industries.

==== State intervention, 1923–1929 ====
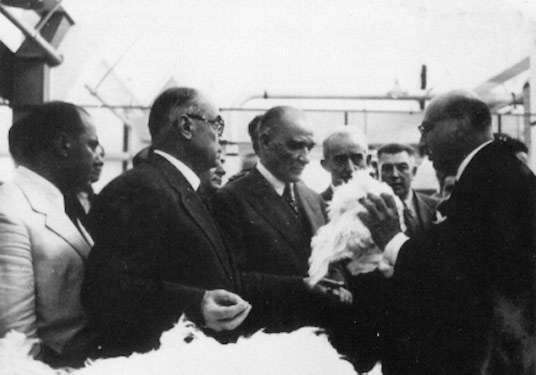
Atatürk and Celâl Bayar visiting the Sümerbank Nazilli Cotton Factory, which was established as a part of the cotton-related industry

Atatürk and İsmet İnönü's pursuit of state-controlled economic policies was guided by a national vision; their goal was to knit the country together, eliminate foreign control of the economy, and improve communications within Turkey. Resources were channeled away from Istanbul, a trading port with international foreign enterprises, in favor of other, less developed cities in order to achieve a more balanced economic development throughout the country.

For Atatürk and his supporters, tobacco remained wedded to his pursuit of economic independence. Turkish tobacco was an important industrial crop, but its cultivation and manufacture had been under French monopolies granted by capitulations of the Ottoman Empire. The tobacco and cigarette trade was controlled by two French companies: the Regie Company and Narquileh Tobacco. The Ottoman Empire had given the tobacco monopoly to the Ottoman Bank as a limited company under the Council of the Public Debt. Regie, as part of the council, had control over tobacco production, storage, and distribution (including export) with unchallenged price control. Consequently, Turkish farmers were dependent on the company for their livelihoods. In 1925, Regie was taken over by the state and named Tekel. Government control of tobacco was one of the greatest achievements of the Kemalist political machinery's "nationalization" of the economy for a country that did not produce oil. Kemalists accompanied this achievement with the development of the country's cotton industry, which peaked during the early 1930s. Cotton was the second most important industrial crop in Turkey at the time.

In 1924, with the initiative of Atatürk, the first Turkish bank İş Bankası was established, with Atatürk as the bank's first member. The bank's creation was a response to the growing need for a truly national establishment and a banking system which was capable of backing up economic activities, managing funds accumulated through policies of savings incentives, and offering resources where necessary to trigger industrial impetus.

In 1927, Turkish State Railways was established. Because Atatürk considered the development of a national rail network as another important step in industrialisation, railways were given high priority. The Turkish State Railway developed an extensive railway network in a very short time.

The Turkish government under Atatürk developed many economic and infrastructure projects within the first decade of the republic. However, the Turkish economy was still largely agrarian, with primitive tools and methods. Roads and transportation facilities were still far from sufficient, and management of the economy was inefficient. The Great Depression brought many changes to this picture.

==== Great Depression, 1929–1931 ====
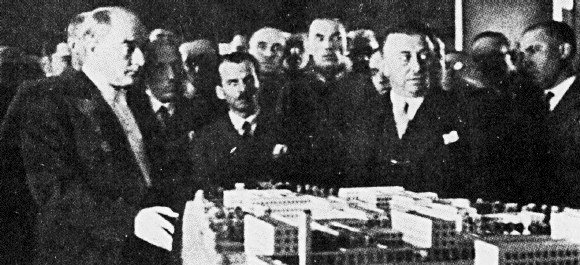
Atatürk supported large-scale government subsidized industrial complexes, such as Sümerbank, increasingly after the Great Depression.

The young republic, like the rest of the world, found itself in a deep economic crisis during the Great Depression. Atatürk reacted to conditions of this period by moving toward integrated economic policies and establishing a central bank to control exchange rates. However, Turkey could not finance essential imports; its currency was shunned, and zealous revenue officials seized the meagre possessions of peasants who could not pay their taxes.

In 1929, Atatürk signed a treaty that resulted in the restructuring of Turkey's debt with the Ottoman Public Debt Administration. At the time, Atatürk not only had to deal with the payment of the Ottoman public debt but also the turbulent economic issues of the Great Depression. For example, until the early 1930s, Turkish private business could not acquire exchange credits. It was impossible to integrate the Turkish economy without a solution to these problems.

In 1931, the Central Bank of the Republic of Turkey was established. The bank's primary purpose was to control the exchange rate and Ottoman Bank's role during its initial years as a central bank was phased out. Later specialized banks such as the Sümerbank (1932) and the Etibank (1935) were founded.

From the political economy perspective, Atatürk faced the problem of political upheaval. The establishment of a new party with a different economic perspective was necessary; he asked Ali Fethi Okyar to meet this end. The Liberal Republican Party (August 1930) was founded with a liberal program and proposed that state monopolies should be ended, foreign capital should be attracted, and state investment should be curtailed. Nevertheless, Atatürk maintained the view that "it is impossible to attract foreign capital for essential development," and state capitalism became the dominant agenda during the depression era. In 1931, Atatürk proclaimed: "In the economic area ...the programme of the party is statism." However, the effect of free republicans was felt strongly and state intervention became more moderate and more akin to a form of state capitalism. One of Atatürk's radical left-wing supporters, Yakup Kadri Karaosmanoğlu from the Kadro ("The Cadre") movement, claimed that Atatürk found a third way between capitalism and socialism.

==== Liberalization and planned growth, 1931–1939 ====
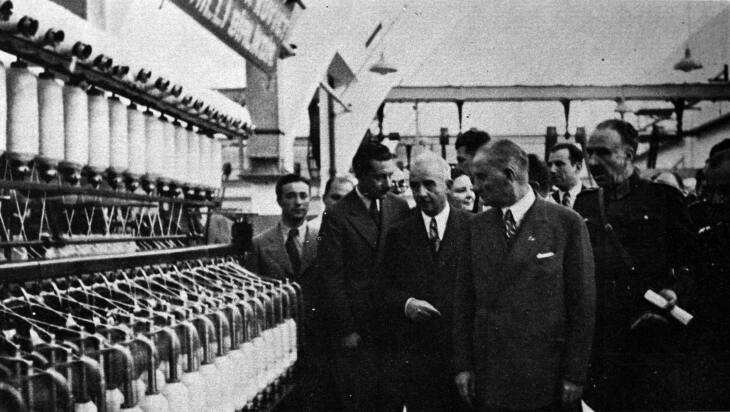
Atatürk and İsmet İnönü at Nazilli Cotton Factory (1937)

The first (1929–1933) and second five-year economic plans were enacted under the supervision of Atatürk. The first five-year economic plan promoted consumer substitution industries. However, these economic plans changed drastically with the death of Atatürk and the rise of World War II. Subsequent governments took measures that harmed the economic productivity of Turkey in various ways. The achievements of the 1930s were credited to early 1920s implementations of the economic system based on Atatürk's national policies.

In 1931, Atatürk watched the development of the first national aircraft, MMV-1. He realised the important role of aviation and stated, "the future lies in the skies". The Turkish Aeronautical Association was founded on 16 February 1925 by his directive. He also ordered the establishment of the Turkish Aircraft Association Lottery. Instead of the traditional raffle prizes, this new lottery paid money prizes. Most of the lottery income was used to establish a new factory and fund aviation projects. However, Atatürk did not live to see the flight of the first Turkish military aircraft built at that factory. Operational American Curtiss Hawk fighters were being produced in Turkey soon after his death and before the onset of World War II.

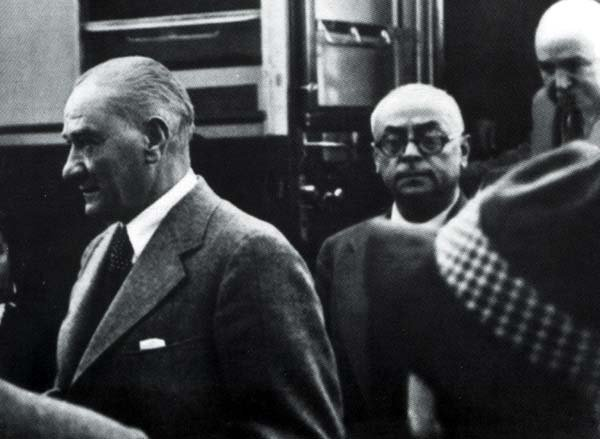
Atatürk and Celâl Bayar

In 1932, liberal economist Celâl Bayar became the Minister of Economy at Atatürk's request and served until 1937. During this period, the country moved toward a mixed economy with its first private initiatives. Textile, sugar, paper, and steel factories (financed by a loan from Britain) were the private sectors of the period. Besides these businesses, government-owned power plants, banks, and insurance companies were established. In this period, Atatürk promoted public-private sector cooperation and the expansion of private businesses with private shareholders firms allowed to purchase shares in state-owned enterprises.

In 1935, the first Turkish cotton print factory "Nazilli Calico print factory" opened. As part of the industrialization process, cotton planting was promoted to furnish raw material for future factory settlements. By 1935, Nazilli became a major industrial center beginning with the establishment of cotton mills followed by a calico print factory.

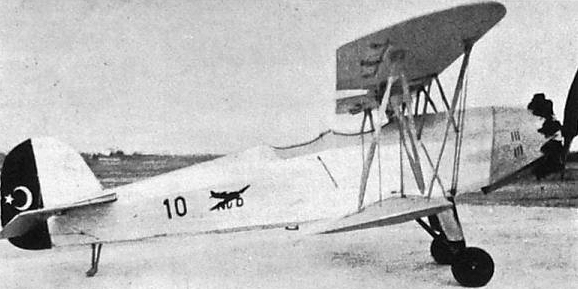
The Nu D.36 built by the Nuri Demirağ Aircraft Works in Istanbul

In 1936, Turkish industrialist Nuri Demirağ established the first Turkish aircraft factory in the Beşiktaş district of Istanbul. The first Turkish airplanes, Nu D.36 and Nu D.38, were produced in this factory.

On 25 October 1937, Atatürk appointed Celâl Bayar as the prime minister of the 9th government. Integrated economic policies reached their peak with the signing of the 1939 Treaty with Britain and France. The treaty signaled a turning point in Turkish history since it was the first step towards an alliance with the West. After İsmet İnönü became president in 1938, the differences between İnönü (who promoted state control) and Bayar (who was liberal) came to the forefront. On 25 January 1939, Prime Minister Bayar resigned.

Atatürk also supported the establishment of the automobile industry. The Turkish Automobile Association was founded in 1923, and its motto was: "The Turkish driver is a man of the most exquisite sensitivities."

In 1935, Turkey was becoming an industrial society based on the Western European model set by Atatürk. However, the gap between Atatürk's goals and the achievements of the socio-political structure of the country had not yet been closed.

== Personal life ==
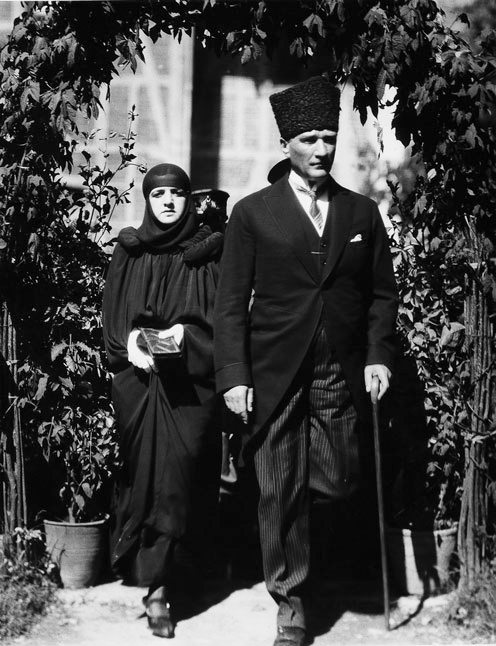
Kemal Atatürk and his wife Latife Uşakizade during a trip to Bursa in 1924

Atatürk's name is associated with four women: Eleni Karinte, Fikriye Hanım, Dimitrina Kovacheva, and Latife Uşşaki. After the Turkish army entered İzmir in 1922, Atatürk met Latife while staying at the house of her father, the shipping magnate Muammer Uşakizade (later Uşaklı). Latife fell in love with Atatürk; again the extent to which this was reciprocated is unknown, but Atatürk was impressed by Latife's intellect: she was a graduate of the Sorbonne and was studying English in London when the war broke out. On 29 January 1923, they were married. Latife was jealous of Fikriye and demanded that she leave the house in Çankaya; Fikriye was devastated and immediately left in a carriage. According to official accounts, she shot herself with a pistol Atatürk had given her as a present.

The triangle of Atatürk, Fikriye, and Latife became the subject of a manuscript by Atatürk's close friend, Salih Bozok, though the work remained unpublished until 2005. Latife was briefly and literally the face of the new Turkish woman, appearing in public in Western clothing with her husband. However, their marriage was not happy; after frequent arguments, the two were divorced on 5 August 1925.

During his lifetime, Atatürk adopted thirteen children: a boy and twelve girls. Of these, the most famous is Sabiha Gökçen, Turkey's first female pilot and the world's first female fighter pilot.

Atatürk's religious beliefs became a subject of debate. Not much is known about his personal beliefs prior to 1920. Even though Atatürk has been critical about the Islamic orthodoxy, especially Sufism, and referred to them as superstitional and accused the tariqats of spreading primitivity and stupidity, there are also positive affirmations of Islam in his speeches. For example, he is quoted as saying that "our religion is the most reasonable and most natural" (en makul ve tabii) and that this is the reason why it is the last religion.

It is known that he deeply engaged with the Islamic religion and in his speech in 1920 he emphasized the sacredness of the caliphate and the sultanate. After the British occupation, Atatürk won the favor of 153 Anatolian muftis who formulated five fatwas against the religious rebellion agitated by Şeyhülislam Dürrizade Abdullah. Furthermore, Atatürk promoted the translation of the Quran into Turkish and ordered a commentary (tefsir) for the Turkish Republic.

Researchers have argued that his discourses about Islam are periodic and that his positive views related to this subject are limited in the early 1920s. According to various sources, Atatürk was an agnostic, i.e. non-doctrinaire deist, or even an atheist, who was antireligious and anti-Islamic in general.

Heidi Weidel considers Atatürk's expression as a form of naturalistic religion, not a reference to Islam. Jens Peter Laut also argues that Atatürk's expressions in favor of Islam are merely political calculations. His Turkish translation of the Quran was also intended to invoke the Başka yok mu?-effect (Is that all?), on the assumption that Turks who learned the meaning of the Arabic text would be turned away from Islam, exposing the Quran as the word of a prophet rather than the literal word of God.

== Death and state funeral ==
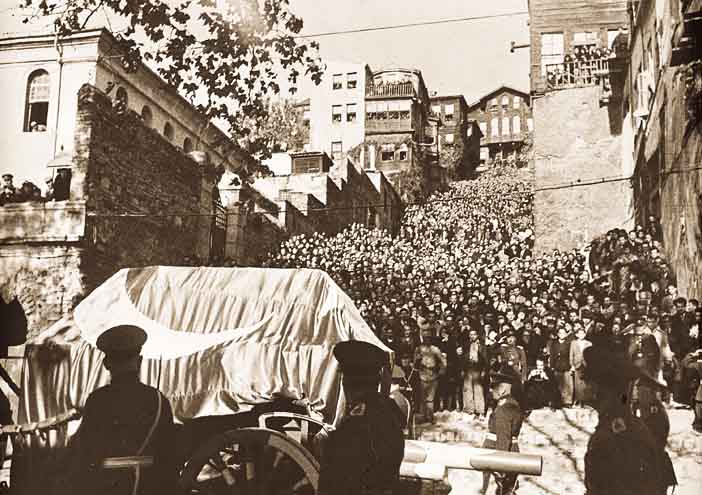
The state funeral of Atatürk, November 1938

Throughout most of his life, Atatürk was a moderate-to-heavy drinker, often consuming half a litre of rakı a day; he also smoked tobacco, predominantly in the form of cigarettes. During 1937, indications that Atatürk's health was worsening started to appear. In early 1938, while on a trip to Yalova, he suffered from a serious illness. He went to Istanbul for treatment, where he was diagnosed with cirrhosis. During his stay in Istanbul, he made an effort to keep up with his regular lifestyle, but eventually succumbed to his illness. He died on 10 November 1938, at the age of 57, in the Dolmabahçe Palace. He was succeeded by İsmet İnönü as president.

Atatürk's funeral called forth both sorrow and pride in Turkey, and 17 countries sent special representatives, while nine contributed armed detachments to the cortège. Atatürk's remains were originally laid to rest in the Ethnography Museum of Ankara, but they were transferred on 10 November 1953 (15 years after his death) in a 42-ton sarcophagus to a mausoleum overlooking Ankara, Anıtkabir.

In his will, Atatürk donated all of his possessions to the Republican People's Party, provided that the yearly interest of his funds would be used to look after his sister Makbule and his adopted children, and fund the higher education of İsmet İnönü's children. The remainder was willed to the Turkish Language Association and the Turkish Historical Society.

== Legacy ==
=== Turkey ===
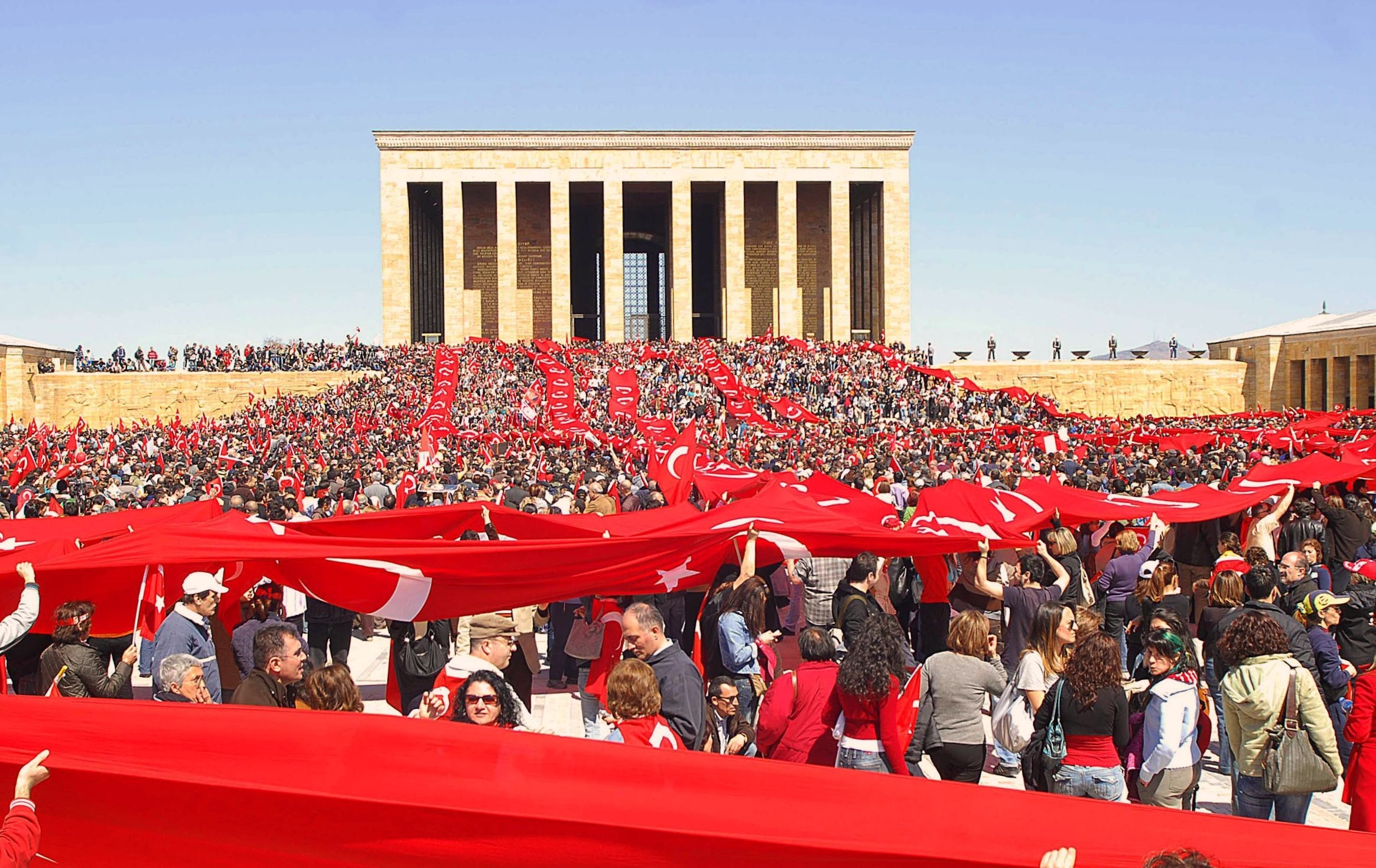
Anıtkabir, the mausoleum of Atatürk in Ankara, is visited by large crowds every year during national holidays such as Republic Day on October 29

Kemal Atatürk is commemorated by many memorials throughout Turkey, such as the Atatürk International Airport in Istanbul, the Atatürk Bridge over the Golden Horn (Haliç), the Atatürk Dam, and Atatürk Stadium. Atatürk statues have been erected in all Turkish cities by the Turkish Government, and most towns have their own memorial to him. His face and name are seen and heard everywhere in Turkey; his portrait can be seen in public buildings, in schools, on all Turkish lira banknotes, and in the homes of many Turkish families. At 9:05 am on every 10 November, at the exact time of Atatürk's death, most vehicles and people in the country's streets pause for one minute in remembrance.

In 1951, the Democrat Party-controlled Turkish parliament led by Prime Minister Adnan Menderes (despite being the conservative opposition to Atatürk's own Republican People's Party) issued a law (Law on Crimes Committed Against Atatürk) outlawing insults to his memory (hatırasına alenen hakaret) and destruction of objects representing him. The demarcation between a criticism and an insult was defined as a political argument, and the Minister of Justice (a political position) was assigned in Article 5 to execute the law rather than the public prosecutor. A government website was created to denounce websites that violate this law.

In 2010, the French-based NGO Reporters Without Borders objected to the Turkish laws protecting the memory of Atatürk, arguing that they contradict the current European Union standards of freedom of speech in news media. Using images of Atatürk continues to be controversial outside of Turkey, with an online dispute attracting attention of Emrah Safa Gürkan and Sevan Nişanyan in 2026.

=== Worldwide ===
John F. Kennedy's speech concerning Atatürk
November 1963

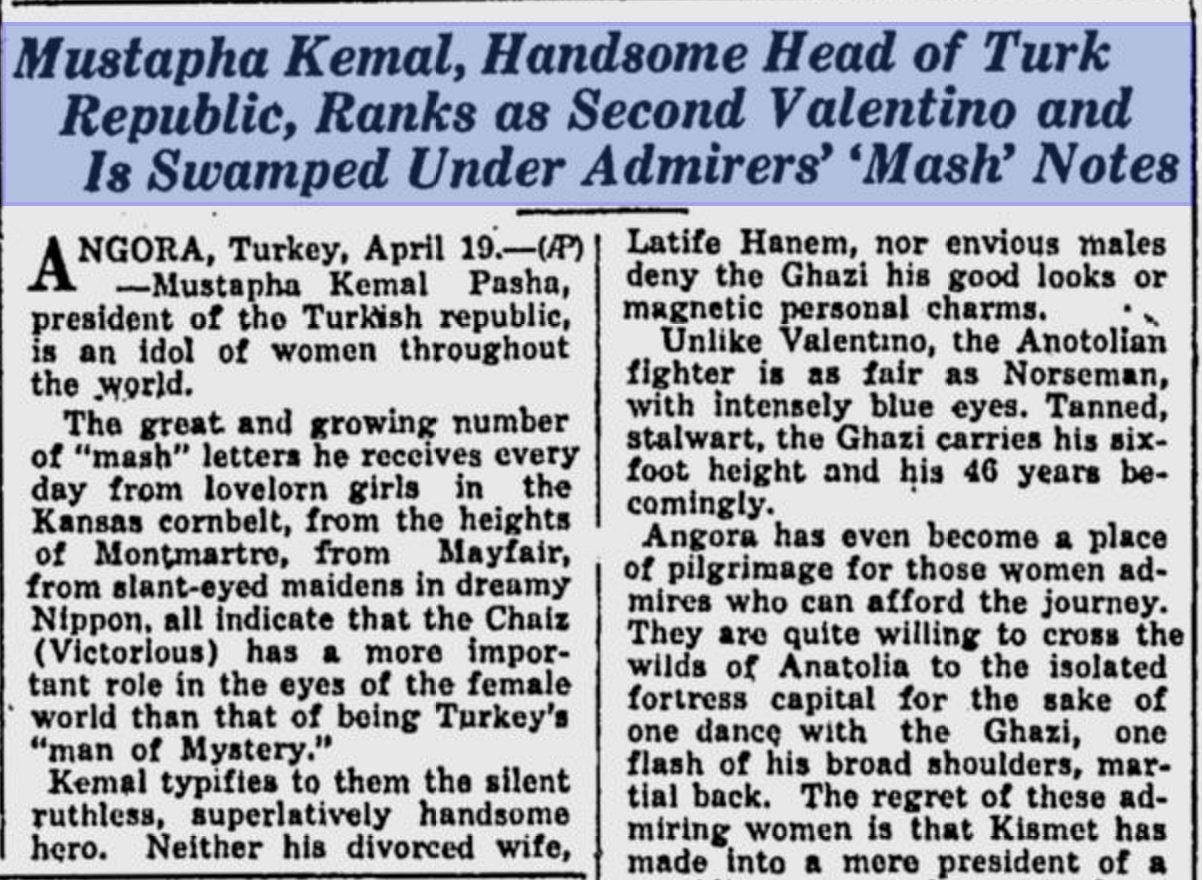
Associated Press news article about the admiration of women from different parts of the world for Mustafa Kemal Atatürk, the handsome leader of the Turkish Republic

In 1981, the centennial of Atatürk's birth, his memory was honoured by the United Nations and UNESCO, which declared it The Atatürk Year in the World and adopted the Resolution on the Atatürk Centennial. The Atatürk Monument in Mexico City on Paseo de la Reforma; the Atatürk Monument in Baku, Azerbaijan; the Atatürk Monument in Almaty, Kazakhstan; the Atatürk Memorial in Wellington, New Zealand (which also serves as a memorial to the ANZAC troops who died at Gallipoli); the Atatürk Memorial in the place of honour on Anzac Parade in Canberra, Australia; and squares called the Plaza Mustafa Kemal Atatürk in Santiago, Chile and the Largo Mustafa Kemal Atatürk in Rome, Italy are a few examples of Atatürk memorials outside Turkey. He has roads named after him in several countries, such as the Kemal Atatürk Marg in New Delhi, India; the Kamal Ataturk Avenues in Dhaka and Chittagong in Bangladesh; the Atatürk Avenue in the heart of Islamabad, Pakistan; the Atatürk Road in the southern city of Larkana in Sindh, Pakistan; Mustafa Kemal Atatürk Street in Tunis, Tunisia; Mustafá Kemal Atatürk Street in the Naco district of Santo Domingo, Dominican Republic; and the street and memorial Atatürk in the Amsterdam-Noord borough of Amsterdam, Netherlands. In addition, the entrance to Princess Royal Harbour in Albany, Western Australia is named Atatürk Channel. There are many statues and streets named after Atatürk in Northern Cyprus.

Despite his radical secular reforms, Atatürk remained broadly popular in the Muslim world. He is remembered for being the creator of a new, fully independent Muslim country at a time of encroachment by Christian powers, and for having prevailed in a struggle against Western imperialism. When he died, the All-India Muslim League eulogised him as a "truly great personality in the Islamic world, a great general, and a great statesman", declaring that his memory would "inspire Muslims all over the world with courage, perseverance, and manliness".

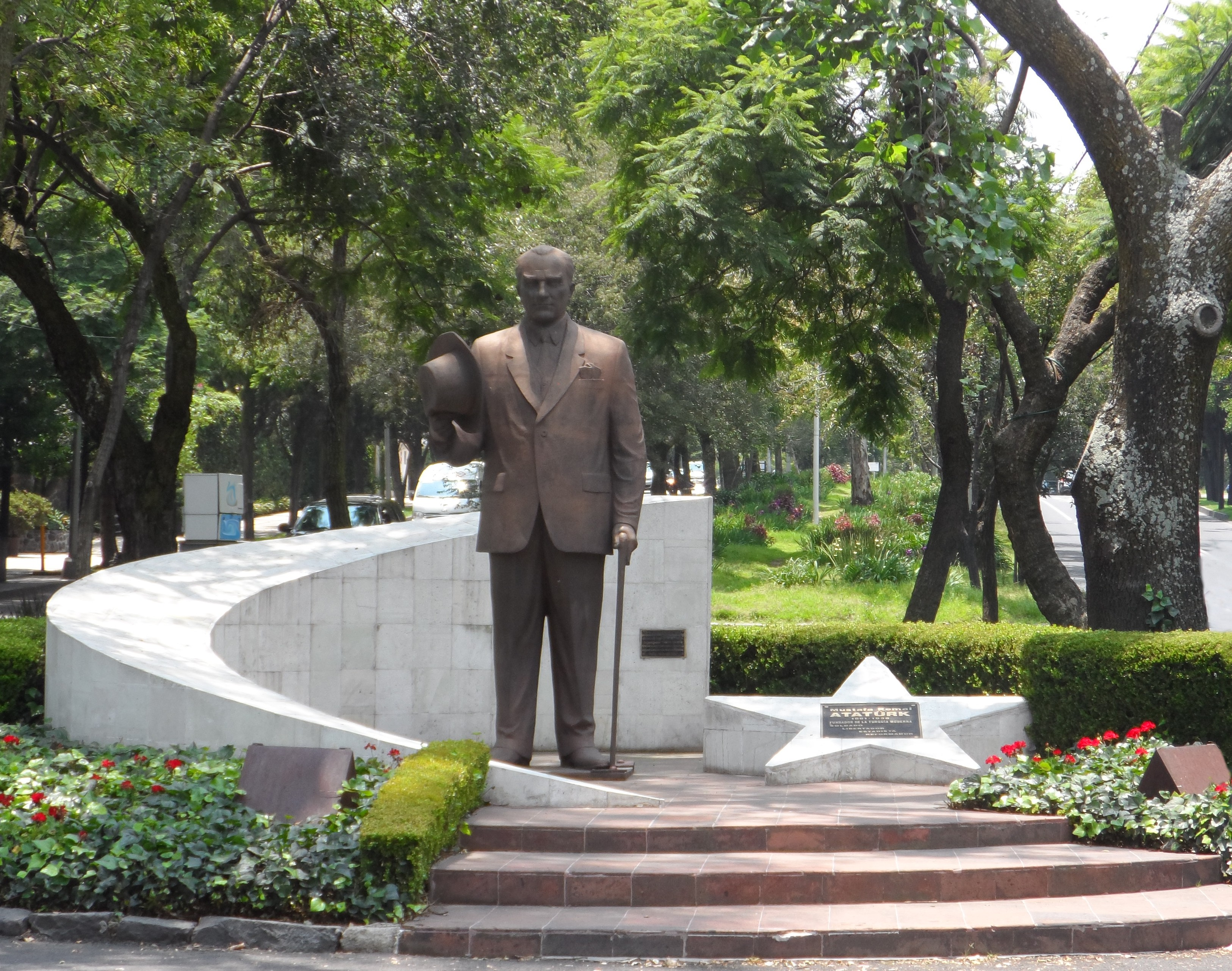
Atatürk memorial on Paseo de la Reforma in Mexico City

The range of Atatürk's admirers extends from the British Prime Minister Winston Churchill, his opponent in World War I, to the German Nazi leader and dictator Adolf Hitler, who called Atatürk a "star in the darkness". Some presidents of the United States, including Franklin D. Roosevelt and John F. Kennedy, also respected Atatürk. President Kennedy paid tribute to Atatürk in 1963 on the 25th anniversary of his death.

As a role model that encouraged national sovereignty, Atatürk was especially revered in countries of the so-called Third World, which saw him as the pioneer of independence from colonial powers. The leaders of such countries included Atatürk's Iranian contemporary Reza Shah Pahlavi, the Indian Prime Minister Jawaharlal Nehru, the Tunisian President Habib Bourguiba, and the Egyptian President Anwar Sadat. The Pakistani poet and philosopher Muhammad Iqbal and the Bangladeshi national poet Kazi Nazrul Islam wrote poems in his honor.

In the epilogue of Grey Wolf, Mustafa Kemal: An Intimate Study of a Dictator, first published in 1932 and the first biography of Atatürk published in his lifetime, H. C. Armstrong described him as a "man born out of due season" and compared him to Timur and Genghis Khan.

The Twelfth International Women Conference was held in Istanbul, Turkey on 18 April 1935, and Egyptian nationalist-feminist Huda Sha'arawi was elected by the conference as the vice-president of the International Women's Union. Huda considered Atatürk as a role model for her actions.

As the leader of the national movement of 1919–1923, Atatürk was described by the Allies and Istanbul journalist Ali Kemal (who believed the liberation efforts would fail and cause a more severe punishment by the Allies) as a "bandit chief". British statesman Arthur Balfour in this context called Atatürk the "most terrible of all the terrible Turks". His critics denounce him as an authoritarian despot responsible for numerous acts of repression and massacres. During his presidency, several instances of violence were committed against Kurdish rebels. According to Turkish Army general Osman Pamukoğlu, Atatürk personally gave the operational order of the Dersim massacre (1937–1938) against the rebellion.

== Works ==
- Cumalı Ordugâhı - Süvâri: Bölük, Alay, Liva Tâlim ve Manevraları [Cumalı Camp - Cavalry: Company, Regiment, Brigade Training and Maneuvers], Thessaloniki, 1909.
- Ta’biye ve Tatbîkat Seyahati [Organization and Application Trip], Selanik Askeri Matbaası, 1911.
- Ta’biye Mes’elesinin Halli ve Emirlerin Sûret-i Tahrîrine Dâir Nasâyih [Advice on the Solution to the Problem of Organization and the Methods of Recording Orders], Edirne Sanayi Mektebi Matbaası, 1916.
- Taʼlîm ve Terbiye-i Askeriyye Hakkında Nokta-i Nazarlar [Points of View on Instruction and Military Training], Edirne Sanayi Mektebi Matbaası, 1916.
- Zâbit ve Kumandan ile Hasb-ı Hâl [Discourse with an Officer and a Commander], Minber Matbaası, 1918.
- Nutuk [Speech], Turkish Aeronautical Association, Ankara, 1927.
- Vatandaş için Medeni Bilgiler [Civic Information for Citizens], Milliyet Matbaası, İstanbul, 1930.
- Geometri [Geometry], 1937.

=== Translations ===
- Takımın Muharebe Tâlimi [Combat Training for the Squad], Selanik Asır Matbaası, Thessaloniki, 1908. (From German)
- Bölüğün Muharebe Tâlimi [Combat Training for the Company], 1912. (From German)

== Awards and decorations ==
Atatürk received awards and decorations before, during, and after World War I.

=== National honours ===
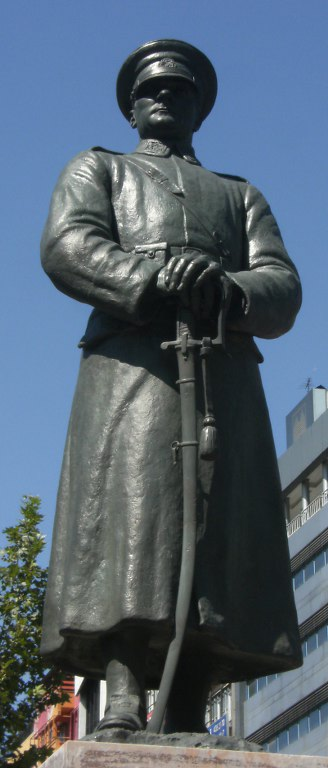
Statue of Atatürk in Ankara

- Ottoman Empire:
  - Fifth Class Knight Order of the Medjidie awarded by Abdul Hamid II (25 December 1906)
  - Silver Imtiyaz Medal awarded by Mehmed V (30 April 1915)
  - Silver Liakat Medal awarded by Mehmed V (1 September 1915)
  - Golden Liakat Medal awarded by Mehmed V (17 January 1916)
  - Second Class Knight Order of Osmanieh awarded by Mehmed V (1 February 1916)
  - Second Class Knight Order of the Medjidie awarded by Mehmed V (12 December 1916)
  - Golden Imtiyaz Medal awarded by Mehmed V (23 September 1917)
  - First Class Knight Order of the Medjidie awarded by Mehmed V (16 December 1917)
  - Gallipoli Star awarded by Mehmed VI (11 May 1918)
- Turkey:
  - Medal of Independence awarded by Grand National Assembly of Turkey (21 November 1923)
  - Murassa Order awarded by Turkish Aeronautical Association (20 May 1925)

=== Foreign honours ===
- Kingdom of Bulgaria: Commander Grand Cross Order of Saint Alexander awarded by Ferdinand I (1915)
- German Empire: Iron Cross of the German Empire awarded by Wilhelm II (1915)
- Austria-Hungary:
  - Military Merit Medal (Austria-Hungary) awarded by Franz Joseph I (1916)
  - 2nd Class Military Merit Cross (Austria-Hungary) awarded by Charles I (1916)
  - 3rd Class Military Merit Cross (Austria-Hungary) awarded by Franz Joseph I (27 July 1916)
- German Empire:
  - 1st Class Iron Cross of the German Empire awarded by Wilhelm II (1917)
  - 2nd Class Iron Cross of the German Empire awarded by Wilhelm II (9 September 1917)
- Kingdom of Prussia: 1st Class Order of the Crown Prussia awarded by Wilhelm II (1918)
- Kingdom of Afghanistan: Alüyülala Order of Kingdom of Afghanistan awarded by Amānullāh Khān (27 March 1923)

== See also ==
- Atatürk Forest Farm and Zoo
- European interwar dictatorships
- İleri
- Kemalist historiography
- Law on Crimes Committed Against Atatürk
- List of covers of Time magazine (1920s) – 24 March 1923 and 21 February 1927
- Sun Language Theory
- Timeline of Mustafa Kemal Atatürk
- Turkish History Thesis
- Turkish War of Independence
  - List of high-ranking commanders of the Turkish War of Independence
  - Timeline of the Turkish War of Independence

== Bibliography ==
- Baer, Marc D. (2020). Sultanic Saviors and Tolerant Turks: Writing Ottoman Jewish History, Denying the Armenian Genocide. Indiana University Press. ISBN 978-0-253-04542-3.
- Bozarslan, Hamit [in French]; Duclert, Vincent [in French]; Kévorkian, Raymond H. (2015). Comprendre le génocide des arméniens – 1915 à nos jours [Understanding the Armenian genocide: 1915 to the present day] (in French). Tallandier. ISBN 979-10-210-0681-2.
- Cheterian, Vicken (2015). Open Wounds: Armenians, Turks and a Century of Genocide. Hurst. ISBN 978-1-84904-458-5.
- Göçek, Fatma Müge (2011). "Reading Genocide: Turkish Historiography on 1915". In Suny, Ronald Grigor; Göçek, Fatma Müge; Naimark, Norman M. (eds.). A Question of Genocide: Armenians and Turks at the End of the Ottoman Empire. Oxford University Press. pp. 42–52. ISBN 978-0-19-979276-4.
- Kévorkian, Raymond (2020). "The Final Phase: The Cleansing of Armenian and Greek Survivors, 1919–1922". Collective and State Violence in Turkey: The Construction of a National Identity from Empire to Nation-State. Berghahn Books. pp. 147–173. ISBN 978-1-78920-451-3.
- Kieser, Hans-Lukas (2018). Talaat Pasha: Father of Modern Turkey, Architect of Genocide. Princeton University Press. ISBN 978-1-4008-8963-1.
- Nichanian, Mikaël [in French] (2015). Détruire les Arméniens. Histoire d'un génocide [Destroying the Armenians: History of a Genocide] (in French). Presses Universitaires de France. ISBN 978-2-13-062617-6.
- Suciyan, Talin (2015). The Armenians in Modern Turkey: Post-Genocide Society, Politics and History. I.B. Tauris. ISBN 978-0-85772-773-2.
- Ulgen, Fatma (2010). "Reading Mustafa Kemal Atatürk on the Armenian Genocide of 1915". Patterns of Prejudice. 44 (4): 369–391. doi:10.1080/0031322X.2010.510719. PMID 20857578.
- Suny, Ronald Grigor (2015). "They Can Live in the Desert but Nowhere Else": A History of the Armenian Genocide. Princeton University Press. ISBN 978-1-4008-6558-1.
- Zürcher, Erik Jan (2011). "Renewal and Silence: Postwar Unionist and Kemalist Rhetoric on the Armenian Genocide". In Suny, Ronald Grigor; Göçek, Fatma Müge; Naimark, Norman M. (eds.). A Question of Genocide: Armenians and Turks at the End of the Ottoman Empire. Oxford University Press. pp. 306–316. ISBN 978-0-19-979276-4.

Prints

- Ahmad, Feroz (1993). The Making of Modern Turkey. London; New York: Routledge. ISBN 978-0-415-07835-1.
- Armstrong, Harold Courtenay (1972). Grey Wolf, Mustafa Kemal: An Intimate Study of a Dictator. Freeport, NY: Books for Libraries Press. ISBN 978-0-8369-6962-7.
- Atillasoy, Yüksel (2002). Atatürk: First President and Founder of the Turkish Republic. Woodside, NY: Woodside House. ISBN 978-0-9712353-4-2.
- Bacqué-Grammont, Jean-Louis; Roux, Jean-Paul (1983). Mustafa Kemal et la Turquie nouvelle (in French). Paris: Maisonneuve et Larose. ISBN 2-7068-0829-2.
- Barber, Noel (1988). Lords of the Golden Horn. London: Arrow. ISBN 978-0-09-953950-6.
- Barlas, Dilek (1998). Statism and Diplomacy in Turkey: Economic and Foreign Policy Strategies in an Uncertain World, 1929–1939. New York: Brill Academic Publishers. ISBN 978-90-04-10855-4.
- Cleveland, William L (2004). A History of the Modern Middle East. Boulder, Colorado: Westview Press. ISBN 978-0-8133-4048-7.
- Crease, Robert P. (2019). "Kemal Atatürk: Science and Patriotism". The workshop and the world: what ten thinkers can teach us about science and authority. New York: W.W. Norton & Co., Inc. pp. 189–204. ISBN 978-0-393-29243-5. OCLC 1037807472.
- Doğan, Çağatay Emre (2003). Formation of Factory Settlements Within Turkish Industrialization and Modernization in 1930s: Nazilli Printing Factory (in Turkish). Ankara: Middle East Technical University. OCLC 54431696.
- Hanioğlu, M. Şükrü (2011). Atatürk: An Intellectual Biography. New Jersey and Woodstock (Oxfordshire): Princeton University Press. ISBN 978-0-691-15109-0.
- Huntington, Samuel P. (2006). Political Order in Changing Societies. New Haven, Conn.; London: Yale University Press. ISBN 978-0-300-11620-5.
- İğdemir, Uluğ; Mango, Andrew (translation) (1963). Atatürk. Ankara: Turkish National Commission for UNESCO. pp. 165–170. OCLC 75604149.
- İnan, Ayşe Afet (2007). Atatürk Hakkında Hatıralar ve Belgeler (in Turkish). Istanbul: Türkiye İş Bankası Kültür Yayınları. ISBN 978-9944-88-140-1.
- İnan, Ayşe Afet; Sevim, Ali; Süslü, Azmi; Tural, M Akif (1998). Medeni bilgiler ve M. Kemal Atatürk'ün el Yazıları (in Turkish). Ankara: AKDTYK Atatürk Araştırma Merkezi. ISBN 978-975-16-1276-2.
- Kinross, Patrick (2003). Atatürk: The Rebirth of a Nation. London: Phoenix Press. ISBN 978-1-84212-599-1. OCLC 55516821.
- Kinross, Patrick (1979). The Ottoman Centuries: The Rise and Fall of the Turkish Empire. New York: Morrow. ISBN 978-0-688-08093-8.
- Landau, Jacob M (1983). Atatürk and the Modernization of Turkey. Boulder, Colorado: Westview Press. ISBN 978-0-86531-986-8.
- Lengyel, Emil (1962). They Called Him Atatürk. New York: The John Day Co. OCLC 1337444.
- Mango, Andrew (2002) [1999]. Atatürk: The Biography of the Founder of Modern Turkey (Paperback ed.). Woodstock, NY: Overlook Press, Peter Mayer Publishers, Inc. ISBN 978-1-58567-334-6.
- Mango, Andrew (2004). Atatürk. London: John Murray. ISBN 978-0-7195-6592-2.
- Saikal, Amin; Schnabel, Albrecht (2003). Democratization in the Middle East: Experiences, Struggles, Challenges. Tokyo: United Nations University Press. ISBN 978-92-808-1085-1.
- Shaw, Stanford Jay; Shaw, Ezel Kural (1976–1977). History of the Ottoman Empire and Modern Turkey. Cambridge; New York: Cambridge University Press. ISBN 978-0-521-21280-9.
- Spangnolo, John (1992). The Modern Middle East in Historical Perspective: Essays in Honour of Albert Hourani. Oxford: Middle East Centre, St. Antony's College. ISBN 978-0-86372-164-9. OCLC 80503960.
- Tunçay, Mete (1972). Mesaî : Halk Şûrâlar Fırkası Programı, 1920 (in Turkish). Ankara: Ankara Üniversitesi Siyasal Bilgiler Fakültesi. OCLC 1926301.
- Tüfekçi, Gürbüz D (1981). Universality of Atatürk's Philosophy. Ankara: Pan Matbaacılık. OCLC 54074541.
- Yapp, Malcolm (1987). The Making of the Modern Near East, 1792–1923. London; New York: Longman. ISBN 978-0-582-49380-3.
- Webster, Donald Everett (1973). The Turkey of Atatürk; Social Process in the Turkish Reformation. New York: AMS Press. ISBN 978-0-404-56333-2.
- Zürcher, Erik Jan (2004). Turkey: A Modern History. London; New York: I.B. Tauris. ISBN 978-1-85043-399-6.

Journals

- Eastham, J. K. (March 1964). "The Turkish Development Plan: The First Five Years". The Economic Journal. 74 (298): 132–136. doi:10.2307/2228117. ISSN 0013-0133. JSTOR 2228117.
- Emrence, Cem (2003). "Turkey in Economic Crisis (1927–1930): A Panoramic Vision". Middle Eastern Studies. 39 (4): 67–80. doi:10.1080/00263200412331301787. ISSN 0026-3206. S2CID 144066199.
- Omur, Aslı (December 2002). "Modernity and Islam: Experiences of Turkish Women". Turkish Times. 13 (312). ISSN 1043-0164. Archived from the original on 7 October 2007.
- Özelli, M. Tunç (January 1974). "The Evolution of the Formal Educational System and its Relation to Economic Growth Policies in the First Turkish Republic". International Journal of Middle East Studies. 5 (1): 77–92. doi:10.1017/s0020743800032803. ISSN 0020-7438. JSTOR 162345. S2CID 154739517.
- Stone, Norman (2000). "Talking Turkey". The National Interest. 61: 66. ISSN 0884-9382.
- Volkan, Vamık D. (1981). "Immortal Atatürk – Narcissism and Creativity in a Revolutionary Leader". Psychoanalytic Study of Society. 9: 221–255. ISSN 0079-7294. OCLC 60448681.
- Wolf-Gazo, Ernest (1996). "John Dewey in Turkey: An Educational Mission". Journal of American Studies of Turkey. 3: 15–42. ISSN 1300-6606. Archived from the original on 27 March 2009.
- "Mustafa Kemal Atatürk". TP Editors. pp. 7–8. Archived from the original on 30 April 2008.
- "The Burial of Atatürk". Time Magazine. 23 November 1953. pp. 37–39. Archived from the original on 14 November 2006.

Military offices
Preceded by Ahmet İzzet Furgaç	Commander of the Second Army; March – July 1917	Succeeded by Fevzi Çakmak
Unknown	Commander of the Seventh Army; July – October 1917	Succeeded by Fevzi Çakmak
Preceded by Fevzi Çakmak	Commander of the Seventh Army; August – September 1918	Formation destroyed
Preceded by Otto Liman von Sanders	Commander of Thunder Army Group; Residual elements October – November 1918	Formation dissolved
Political offices
New title State founded	Prime Minister of Turkey; 25 April 1920 – 24 January 1921	Succeeded by Fevzi Çakmak
New title State founded	Speaker of the Parliament of Turkey; 24 April 1920 – 29 October 1923	Succeeded by Fethi Okyar
New title State founded	President of Turkey; 29 October 1923 – 10 November 1938	Succeeded by İsmet İnönü
Party political offices
New title State founded	Leader of the Republican People's Party; 9 September 1923 – 10 November 1938	Succeeded by İsmet İnönü
