= Fikriye =

Mustafa Kemal Atatürk's relative and girlfriend

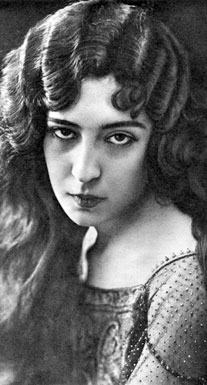
- Fikriye Hanım
- Born: Zeynep Fikriye; 1887; Larissa, Greece
- Died: 31 May 1924 (aged 36–37); Ankara, Turkey
- Other name: Zeynep Fikriye Özdincer (posthumously)
- Partner: Mustafa Kemal Atatürk
- Children: Abdurrahman (adopted)

Fikriye Hanım, posthumously Zeynep Fikriye Özdinçer, (1887 – 31 May 1924) was a Turkish woman. She was a relative of Mustafa Kemal Atatürk — she was the daughter of Memduh Hayrettin Bey (in several sources his name is mentioned differently, as "Hüsamettin Bey"), who was the brother of Ragıp Bey, Zübeyde Hanım's second husband — and his girlfriend. Some sources claim that they were married for a certain period of time (under "Imam marriage", " İmam nikâhı" in Turkish). Her unexplained death remains mysterious.

== Private life ==
Fikriye was born in the city of Larissa, in the region of Thessaly, then part of the Kingdom of Greece. Historians agree on her birth year as 1887, while some sources give it as 1897. Her father was Memduh Hayrettin and her mother was Vasfiye. She had a sister Jülide and an elder brother Enver.

Besides her mother tongue Turkish, it is said that she spoke Greek and French and it is also said that she played the piano and the oud.

== Emotional relationship ==
Fikriye met Mustafa Kemal in Thessaloniki when she was a young girl. She met him again in Istanbul, where she moved to right before the Balkan Wars (1912–1913), and again one year later after the war. She developed an emotional relationship to her step cousin. However, they met sporadically due to Mustafa Kemal's involvement in battles during World War I and the Turkish War of Independence (1919–1922).

During this time, her parents and her sister died one by one and Fikriye decided to go to Ankara to meet Mustafa Kemal, who was leading the Turkish National Movement in Ankara. Istanbul was occupied and under military administration of the Allies of World War I. She sailed to Karadeniz Ereğli at the Black Sea and then reached Ankara over Kastamonu. She met Mustafa Kemal and lived with him some time at the direction building of the Turkish State Railways, which Mustafa Kemal used as residence and headquarters. According to some sources, they married by Islamic marital practice -no civil marriage was in use at that time-, and it was kept secret from the public.

It is asserted that Mustafa Kemal's mother Zübeyde Hanım (1856–1923) and his sister Makbule (1885–1956) were for a long time ago against a relationship between the two. During the Battle of Sakarya (23 August – 13 September 1921), Mustafa Kemal Pasha, commander of the Turkish troops, ordered Ankara from the frontline that his paycheck to be handed over to Fikriye. On 28 August 1922, Mustafa Kemal Pasha sent a telegram to Ankara from the frontline of the Great Offensive (26 August – 18 September 1922), in which he summarized the victorious situation of the battle to his mother and Fikriye.

After the recapture of the ancient Greek Smyrna today İzmir, on 9 September 1922, Mustafa Kemal met Latife, a western-educated member of a wealthy family in İzmir. Meanwhile, Fikriye was sent to Munich, Germany for treatment of respiratory disease.

Mustafa Kemal, married Latife on 29 January 1923 in Ankara. As Fikriye learned of the marriage of Mustafa Kemal, she escaped from the sanatorium in Munich, returned to Turkey to see Mustafa Kemal in Ankara. She went to Ankara although Mustafa Kemal sent a telegram saying that "he does not allow her to come to Ankara as she returned to Turkey without his knowledge."

== Death ==
Atatürk became the first President of Turkey following the proclamation of the Republic on 29 October 1923.

Latife was jealous of Fikriye and demanded that she leave the Çankaya Mansion, the official residence of the President; Fikriye finally left in a carriage on 21 May 1924. According to official accounts, she shot herself - it seems - with a pistol that Atatürk had given her as a present. She died after nine days in the State Hospital in Ankara on 31 May.

The prosecutor launched an investigation to clear up the cause of her death. The investigation was proscribed after 30 years, and was again prolonged for 30 years twice. After 90 years, the case was finally abated leaving open the cause of death, be that suicide or homicide.

The site of her grave is unknown.

== Aftermath ==
Around 11 years after her death, she was registered as Zeynep Fikriye Özdincer by her brother Ali Enver, who adopted the family name Özdincer following the enactment of the Surname Law in Turkey in 1934.

Not much is known officially about her. There are only 26 documents, which are dated mostly between 1920 and 1923, in the Presidential Archives related to her.

Personal belongings and some private photographs of Fikriye were donated by her nephew Hayri Özdinçer to the "Atatürk's Residence and Railway Museum" (Turkish: Atatürk Konutu Ve Demiryolları Müzesi) in Ankara in 2006.

Her relationship to Mustafa Kemal is narrated in the play "Fikriye ve Latife – Mustafa Kemal'i Sevdim" by Dilruba Saatçi.

== Bibliography ==
- Topuz, Hıfzı (November 2001). Gazi ve Fikriye (PDF) (in Turkish) (1st ed.). Remzi Kitabevi. ISBN 978-975-14-0822-8.
- Movit, Hüseyin (1 January 2010). Atatürk'ün Gizli Aşkı Fikriye (in Turkish) (5th ed.). Truva Yayınları. p. 184. ISBN 978-6055638375.
