= Timeline of Mustafa Kemal Atatürk =

Timeline of Mustafa Kemal Atatürk is a timeline of events during the lifespan of Mustafa Kemal Atatürk. The timeline also includes the background events starting with the sultan Abdul Hamid II.

Legend
Military career	Leadership during Independence	Presidency	Personal life

1876	1 September	Accession of Abdul Hamid II.
1876	23 December	Promulgation of Ottoman constitution Ottoman constitution of 1876 (Kanûn-ı Esâsî).
1877	19 March	Opening of first Ottoman parliament.
1877	24 April	Russian troops enter Ottoman territory.
1878	14 February	Ottoman parliament dissolved.
1878	3 March	Russian victory confirmed by Treaty of San Stefano (Ayastefanos).
1878	13 July	Treaty of Berlin replaces Treaty of San Stefano.
1881		Mustafa (Kemal Atatürk) born in Salonica (Selanik, now Thessaloniki, Greece).
1881	24 May	New border with Greece. Thessaly ceded to Greece.
1888		Ali Rıza, Mustafa's father, dies.
1893		Mustafa enters military preparatory school in Salonica.
1897		Greco-Ottoman War.
1899	13 March	Mustafa Kemal enters infantry class of War College in Constantinople (now known in English as Istanbul).
1902	10 February	Commissioned Second Lieutenant, and enters Staff College.
1903		Promoted first lieutenant.
1905	11 January	Passes out as staff captain and is posted for Fifth Army in Syria; revives a secret opposition group in Damascus.
1906		Makes clandestine trip to Salonica.
1907	20 June	Promoted Adjutant-Major.
1907	13 October	Posted to Third Army headquarters in Salonica.
1908	22 June	Appointed to Inspectorate of Eastern Railways in Rumelia.
1908	24 July	Young Turk Revolution.
1908	September	Mustafa Kemal travels to Tripoli and Benghazi to re-establish CUP.
1909	13 January	Appointed chief of staff of 7th reserve division in Salonica.
1909	13 April	Travels with his division to the outskirts of Constantinople; 31 March Incident.
1909	27 April	Abdul Hamid II deposed and succeeded by Mehmet V; 31 March Incident.
1910	September	Visits French army manoeuvres in Picardy.
1911	15 January	Appointed to 5th army corps headquarters.
1911	January	Commander 38th infantry regiment.
1911	13 September	Posted to general staff in Constantinople.
1911	September	Volunteers for service against the Italians in Cyrenaica.
1911	27 November	Promoted major.
1912	11 March	Appointed commander of Derne sector in Cyrenaica; Italo-Turkish War.
1912	8 October	First Balkan War.
1912	8 October	Salonica falls to the Greeks.
1912	24 October	Mustafa Kemal leaves Cyrenaica and returns to Constantinople.
1912	25 November	Appointed director of operations of Straits Composite Force.
1913	23 January	CUP seizes power (1913 Ottoman coup d'état).
1913	24 March	Adrianople (Edirne) falls to the Bulgarians.
1913	29 June	Second Balkan War.
1913	21 July	Ottomans reoccupy Edirne.
1913	29 September	Treaty of Constantinople fixes Turkish-Bulgarian frontier.
1913	27 October	Mustafa Kemal appointed military attaché in Sofia.
1914	1 March	Mustafa Kemal promoted lieutenant-colonel.
1914	28 July	Austria declares war on Serbia; beginning of First World War.
1914	2 August	Ottoman Empire signs Ottoman–German alliance.
1914	29 October	After Pursuit of Goeben and Breslau Ottoman navy under German command shells Russian targets.
1914	2 November	Russia declares war on Ottoman Empire.
1914	5 November	Britain declares war on Ottoman Empire.
1914	5 November	France declares war on Ottoman Empire.
1915	20 January	Mustafa Kemal leaves Sofia to take up appointment as commander of 19th division for service in Battle of Gallipoli.
1915	21 March	Allied navy fails to force the straits at Naval operations in the Dardanelles Campaign.
1915	27 April	Allied troops Landing at Anzac Cove faced with Kemal.
1915	6 August	Final attempts made by the British at Battle of Sari Bair faced with Kemal.
1919	30 April	Appointed the Inspector of the Ninth Army Troops.
1919	19 May	Kemal lands in Samsun.
1919	8 July	Mustafa Kemal resigns from the post of Inspector of Third Army and from the army.
1919	23 July	Kemal elected Chairman of Erzurum Congress.
1920	23 April	Kemal opens the Grand National Assembly (BMM) in Angora (now Ankara).
1920	11 May	Kemal is condemned to death by the government in Constantinople.
1921	5 August	Appointed Commander - in - Chief by the Grand National Assembly.
1921	23 August	The battle of Sakarya begins with Turkish troops led by Mustafa Kemal.
1921	19 September	Kemal receives the rank of marshal and the title Gazi (veteran, victorious warrior).
1922	26 August	Gazi Mustafa Kemal begins to lead Great Offensive from the hill of Kocatepe.
1922	30 August	Mustafa Kemal at the Battle of Dumlupınar.
1922	10 September	Enters Izmir.
1922	1 November	The Grand National Assembly abolish the Sultanate.
1923	14 January	Zübeyde Hanım dies in Smyrna (now Izmir).
1923	29 January	Mustafa Kemal and Latife Uşşakizade marry in Izmir.
1923	29 October	Proclamation of the Republic of Turkey.
1923	29 October	Elected first president.
1928	9 August	Speaks at Sarayburnu about the new Turkish alphabet.
1932	12 July	Founds the Turkish Linguistic Society (now the Turkish Language Association).
1934	16 June	The Grand National Assembly of Turkey passes a law granting him the surname "ATATÜRK".
1938	10 November	He dies in Dolmabahçe palace.

== See also ==
- Kemalist historiography
- Timeline of the Turkish War of Independence
- Timeline of Turkish history
- World War I timeline
