= Afet İnan =

Turkish historian, anthropologist and sociologist

Prof. Dr. Afet İnan
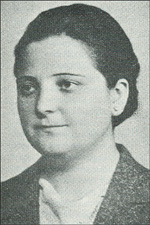
- Born: Ayşe Afet; 30 October 1908; Selanik, Salonica Vilayet, Ottoman Empire
- Died: 8 June 1985 (aged 76); Ankara, Turkey
- Education: History, sociology
- Alma mater: University of Geneva, Switzerland
- Occupation: Academic
- Organization: University of Ankara
- Known for: Adopted daughter of Mustafa Kemal Atatürk
- Spouse: Ahmet Rifat İnan
- Children: 2
- Parent(s): İsmail Hakkı Uzmay (father); Şehzane (mother); Mustafa Kemal Atatürk (adopted father)

Ayşe Afet İnan (30 October 1908 – 8 June 1985) was a Turkish historian and sociologist. She was one of the eight adopted daughters of Mustafa Kemal Atatürk. She was known to be involved in the practice of physical anthropology, as she measured over sixty thousand skulls in Anatolia, which was aimed to support the Turkish History Thesis.

== Biography ==
Afet İnan was born to İsmail Hakkı Bey (İsmail Hakkı Uzmay) and Şehzane Hanım from Doyran (present day Dojran), in 1908 in the district of Kesendire (Polyoroz, present day Kassandra, Greece) in Salonica Vilayet.

She and her family emigrated to Adapazarı because of the Balkan Wars. She started primary school in Adapazarı on March 4, 1913. They then moved to Ankara, Mihalıççık, Karaoğlan, and Biga. Her mother Şehzane died of tuberculosis on May 15, 1915. Since her father then married a young girl, Ayşe Afet decided to become a teacher to earn her own living. When they lived in Biga, her younger sister Nezihe was born to her father Ismail Hakki and his second wife.

In 1920, she finished her six years of primary education. In 1921, they settled to Alanya. In 1922, she got a teaching qualification in Elmalı and was assigned as headteacher to Elmalı Girls' School. She graduated from the Bursa Teachers College for Girls in 1925, and started to work as a primary school teacher in İzmir. She met Mustafa Kemal Atatürk in October of the same year during his visit to İzmir.

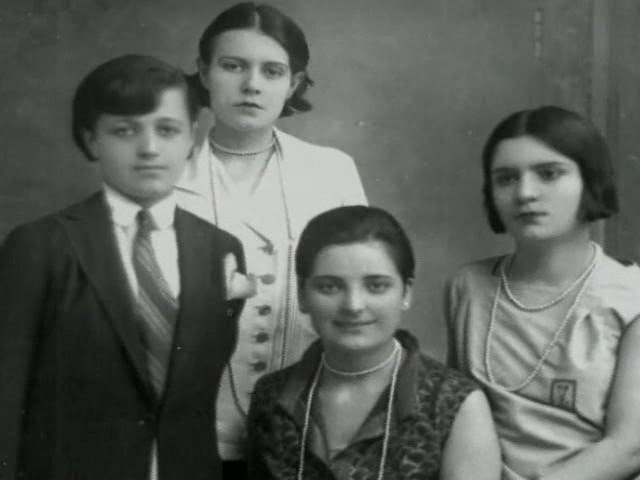
Left to right: Rukiye (Erkin), Sabiha (Gökçen), Afet (İnan), and Zehra (Aylin), adopted daughters of M. K. Atatürk.

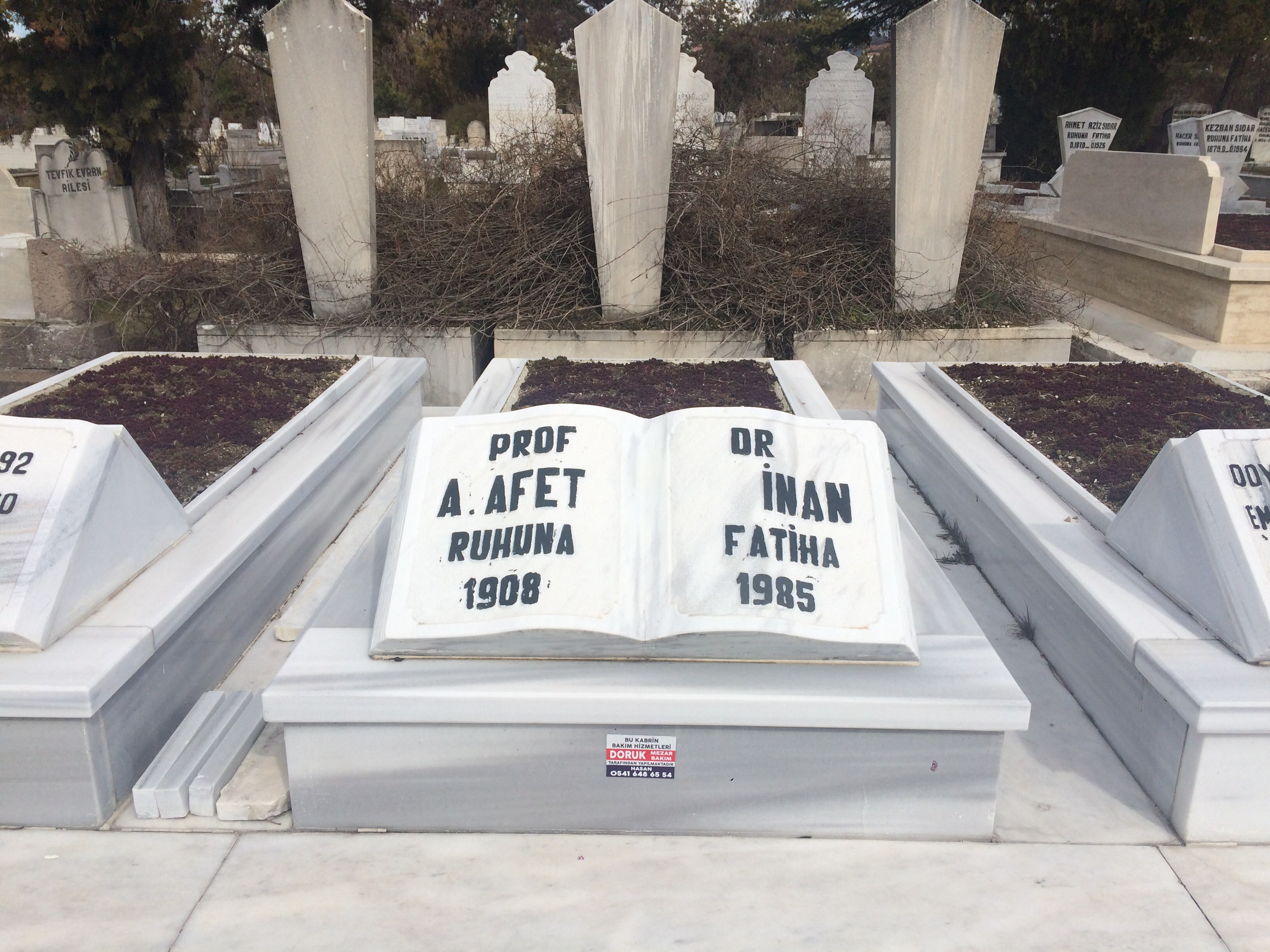
Grave of Afet İnan in Cebeci Asri Cemetery, Ankara

Afet was sent in 1925 by Atatürk to Lausanne, Switzerland, to learn French. After returning to Turkey in 1927, she attended the French Lycée Notre Dame de Sion Istanbul. On finishing there she was appointed as a secondary school teacher for history. In 1935, Afet İnan went to Switzerland again and was a student of Eugène Pittard at the University of Geneva between 1936 and 1938. In 1939, after graduating, she obtained a PhD in sociology. In 1950, she became a professor at the University of Ankara.

She was the co-founder and a leading member of the Turkish Historical Society.

İnan died on 8 June 1985, in Ankara, leaving behind her daughter Arı and her son Demir.

The "Afet İnan Historical Studies Award" is given biennially by the Turkish History Foundation in cooperation with İnan's family.

== Selected bibliography ==
- Medeni bilgiler ve M. Kemal Atatürk'ün el yazıları, Ankara, Türk Tarih Kurumu, 1969
- Atatürk'ten yazdıklarım, Ankara, 1969
- Recherches Sur les Caractéres Anthropologiques des Population de la Turquie, Genève, 1939
- Türk Amirali Piri Reis'in Hayatı ve Eserleri
- L'émancipation de la Femme Turque
- Eski Mısır Tarih ve Medeniyeti, 1956 (History of the Ancient Egypt)
- Biography (in Turkish)
