= Makbule Atadan =

Turkish politician and writer, sister of Mustafa Kemal Atatürk

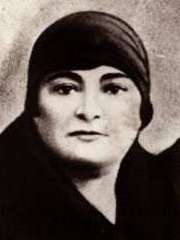
- Makbule (1905)
- Born: Makbule; 1892; Salonica, Salonica Vilayet, Ottoman Empire (present-day Thessaloniki, Greece)
- Died: 18 January 1956 (aged 63–64); Ankara, Turkey
- Resting place: Cebeci Asri Cemetery
- Notable work: "Ağabeyim Mustafa Kemal" (Mustafa Kemal, My Brother) (1952)
- Spouse: Mecdi Boysan (m. 1919; div. 1946)
- Parent(s): Ali Rıza Efendi (father); Zübeyde Hanım (mother)
- Relatives: Mustafa Kemal Atatürk (brother)

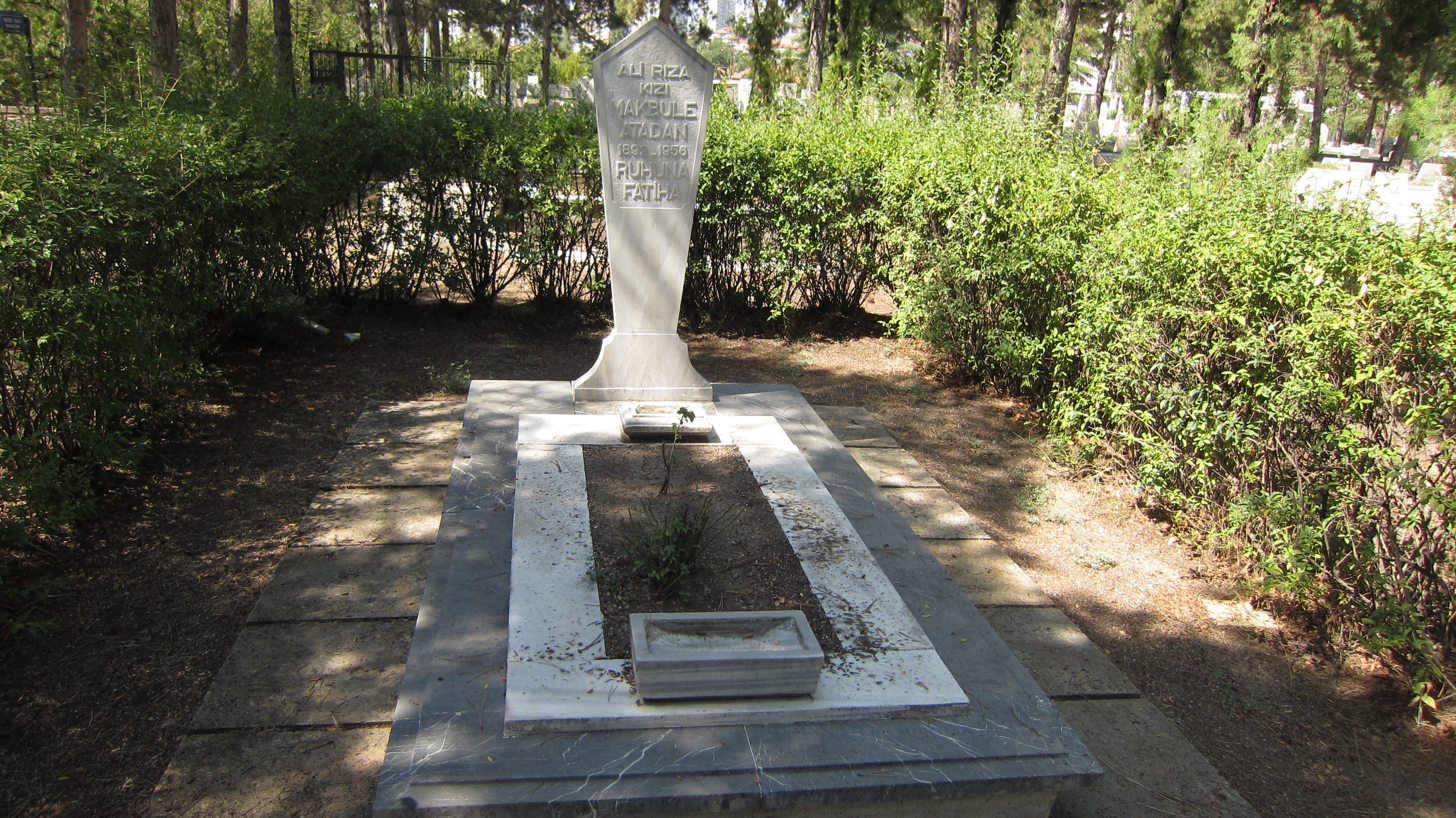
Grave of Makbule Atadan

Makbule Atadan (1892 – 18 January 1956) was the sister of Mustafa Kemal Atatürk, the founder of the Republic of Turkey. She was the only surviving sister of Atatürk, while the other four siblings died at early ages.

Born 1892 in Thessaloniki, then part of the Ottoman Empire, and grown up there, she moved along with her mother Zübeyde Hanım to Istanbul after the Balkan Wars.

Following the foundation of the republic in 1923, she moved with her mother to Ankara, summoned by her brother, who became the first president of Turkey. Later, she lived in the Camlı Köşk (literally Glass Pavilion), a villa built 1936 within the garden of presidential Çankaya Palace especially for her.

In 1930, she entered the political scene joining the newly established "Serbest Cumhuriyet Fırkası" (Free Republican Party) of Fethi Okyar. However, her political life ended soon following the closure of the party by Okyar himself some months later.

Makbule married Mecdi Boysan, a member of the parliament.

She published her memories with her brother Atatürk in her book "Büyük Kardeşim Atatürk" (Atatürk, My Big Brother) (1952).

She died on 18 January 1956 in Ankara around the age of 63, and was buried in the Cebeci Asri cemetery.
