= Ülkü Adatepe =

Adopted daughter of Kemal Atatürk

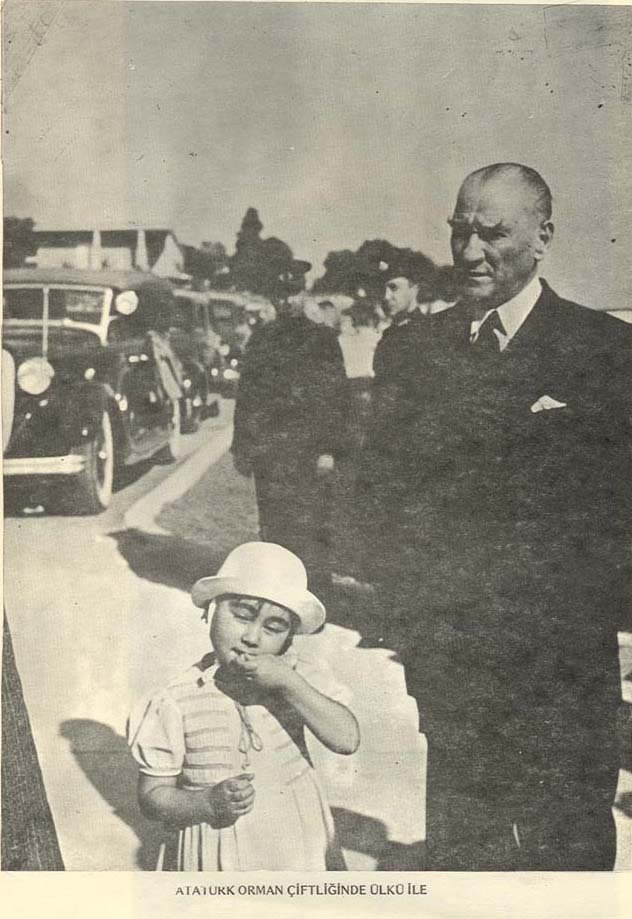
- Ülkü and Atatürk at the Forest Farm
- Born: November 27, 1932; Ankara, Turkey
- Died: August 1, 2012 (aged 79); Sakarya, Turkey
- Other names: Ülkü Çukurluoğlu
- Spouses: Fethi Doğançay; Yeşua Bensusen; Emin Öke Adatepe
- Children: 2 (with Doğançay)
- Parent(s): Mehmet Tahsin Çukuroğlu (father); Vasfiye Çukuroğlu (mother); Mustafa Kemal Atatürk (adopted father)

Ülkü Adatepe (born Ülkü Çukurluoğlu; November 27, 1932 – August 1, 2012) was the youngest adopted daughter of Mustafa Kemal Atatürk. Her interactions with Atatürk were often featured in Turkish media, including the Cover of the Alfabe textbook, which featured Ülkü studying with Atatürk.

She died in a road accident in 2012.

Atatürk teaches the new Turkish alphabet to Ülkü, 1936
