= Ali Rıza Efendi =

Father of Mustafa Kemal Atatürk

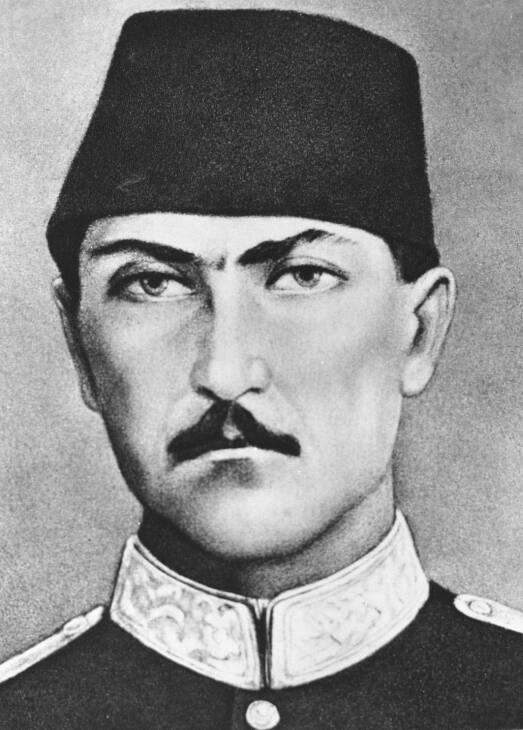
A portrait of a volunteer officer of the Civil Service Battalion (Asâkir-i Mülkiye Taburu) from Thessaloniki, supposed to be Ali Rıza Efendi. However, when the photo was shown, Atatürk reportedly said: "That's not my father". This portrait had been suggested by İlhan Sungu in his article titled "Atatürk'ün Babası Ali Efendi ve Mensup Olduğu Selânik Asakir-i Mülkiye Taburu" and has commenced to be published as Ali Rıza's portrait in 1939.

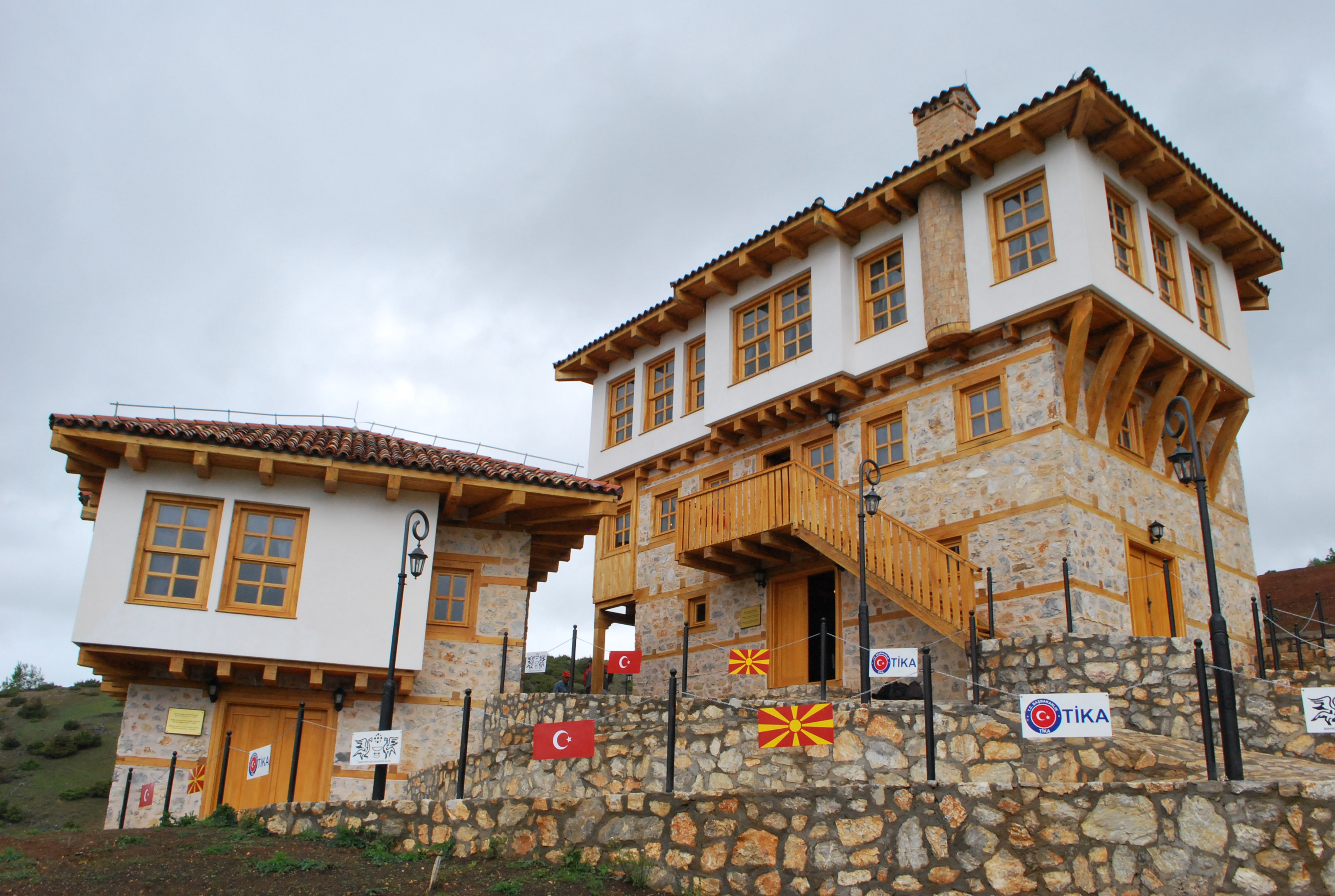
The reconstructed house of Ali Rıza Efendi's family, in Kodžadžik, North Macedonia

Ali Rıza Efendi (1839–1888) was an official, and the father of Mustafa Kemal Atatürk and the husband of Zübeyde Hanım.

He was born in Selanik (modern Thessaloniki in present-day Macedonia, Greece), back then the most important city in the Ottoman Empire in Europe after Constantinople/Istanbul. Ali Rıza's family comes from Kodžadžik, in Centar Župa Municipality near the border to Albania, today in North Macedonia, where there is a memorial house. He is thought to be of local descent: Albanian or Slavic by some scholars such as Andrew Mango, Lou Giaffo, Ernst Jaeckh, etc. However the village where his family was born still has Turkish majority population, and Falih Rıfkı Atay, a journalist and close friend of Atatürk, claimed that he descended from Turks of Söke, in Aydın Province of Anatolia. According to other historians such as Vamık D. Volkan, Norman Itzkowitz, Hasan İzzettin Dinamo, etc: Ali Rıza's ancestors were Turks, ultimately descending from the Turkic nomads called Yörüks of Söke in Aydın Province.

He worked as a customs official and died in 1888 at age 49, when his son was 7 years old. At Mustafa's birth, Ali Rıza hung his sword over his son’s cradle, dedicating him to military service. Most important, Ali Rıza saw to it that his son’s earliest education was carried out in a modern secular school. He left the poorly paying clerk's job to start a lumber business, but bandits set fire to his stock after extorting money from him. He attempted to rejoin the civil service without success. He started drinking heavily afterwards which may have contributed to his early death.
