= Norman Itzkowitz =

American Ottoman historian

Norman Itzkowitz (May 6, 1931 – January 20, 2019) was an American academic who was a professor of Near Eastern Studies at Princeton University. He was an Ottoman historian who brought perception of psychoanalysis into Near Eastern Studies.

Itzkowitz was also the Master of Wilson College at Princeton from 1975 to 1989. While doing this, he assisted the students in developing leadership skills in running the social, cultural, and academic aspects of the college's life.

Out of all of his awards, his most meaningful one was the Buitoni Scholarship in 1952. This enabled him to study at the University for Foreigners Perugia, where he gained cultural and academic experience.

Itzkowitz published many books and articles on The Ottoman Empire and Near Eastern studies. Much of Itzkowitz's work is collaborative, he did much of his studies with Robert Roswell Palmer, Gordon Craig, Cyril E. Black, his Ottoman history mentor Lewis V. Thomas and psychiatrist and psychoanalyst Vamık Volkan.

Itzkowitz was a denier of the Armenian genocide. Itzkowitz claimed to have told an Armenian-American student and descendant of genocide survivors that his "granny's got nothing better to do but sit at home and fill you full of this stuff". Princeton Vice President & Secretary Emeritus Thomas H. Wright released a letter stating the university is opposed to anti-Armenian remarks and behavior, in response to Itzkowitz's statements.

== Education ==
- Stuyvesant High School, New York City, 1946–49
- CCNY, 1949–53, B.A., 1953
- University of Perugia for Foreigners, Perugia, Italy, Summer 1952
- Princeton University, 1953–59, M.A., 1956; Ph.D., 1959
- National Psychological Association for Psychoanalysis, member-in-training, 1972–80

== Family life ==
Norman Itzkowitz was born into a Jewish working-class family in New York City. His father ran a sewing machine in a factory for children's clothing. Norman was the youngest of three; he had a sister who is six years older and a brother who is three years older. Both his brother and sister have doctoral degrees.

Norman married Leonore Krauss on June 13, 1954. He died at the age of 87 in January 2019.

== Employment ==
- Princeton University, Instructor, Departments of History and Oriental Studies, 1958–61
- Assistant Professor, Oriental Studies 1961-66
- Associate Professor, Near Eastern Studies 1966-73
- Professor, Near Eastern Studies, 1973-
- Master, Wilson College, 1975–1989

Visiting Appointments:

- CCNY, Summer 1959
- Teachers College, Columbia University, 1964
- New York University, 1969; 1972; 1974; Summer, 1985
- Hebrew University of Jerusalem, 1970
- University of British Columbia, Summer 1971
- Cunard Lines, Lecturer, May 1991, Black Sea Cruise MS. Vistafiord, Genoa
- The Crimea-Genoa Classical Cruises, lecturer on Black Sea Cruise, September, 1998
- Princeton University Alumni College—Led a tour of Western and Southwestern Turkey entitled "Turkey:Crossroads of Civilizations", for thirty-two Princeton Alumni, last two weeks of June 1994.
- SEABOURN SUN, lecturer on Baltic Sea Cruise, July 2000
- Cunard Lines, QEII, lecturer on New York-Halifax and return Cruise, September 2000.

== Awards, honors and fellowships ==
- Varsity Letters in Fencing and Lacrosse, CCNY
- Phi Beta Kappa, CCNY, 1952
- Buitoni Scholarship, Study in Italy, CCNY, Summer 1952
- Cromwell Medal in History, CCNY, 1953
- Near East Fellow, Princeton University, 1953–54
- Ford Foundation Fellow, 1954–59
- Carnegie Teaching Fellow, CCNY, Summer 1959
- Procter & Gamble Fellow, Princeton University, 1964–65
- HEW, Near East Central Grant for Study Abroad, 1964–65; 1969–70
- SSRC, Travel Grant, 1969–70
- Littauer Foundation Fellow, 1970; 1974
- Center for International Studies Fellow, Summer 1978
- Director, NEH Summer Seminar for Secondary and Elementary School Teachers, Summer 1983 on The Ottoman Legacy in the Modern Middle East
- Director, NEH Summer Institute for Secondary and Elementary School Teachers, Summer 1986 on Islam: History, Culture, and Religion
- Director, NEH Summer Institute for College Teachers, Summer 1987 on Insights into Ottoman Statecraft for College Teachers of European History
- Director, NEH Summer Seminar for Secondary and Elementary School Teachers, Summer 1988 on The Impact of the Islamic Historical Experience on the Contemporary Near East
- Director, NEH Summer Institute for College Teachers, Summer 1989 on The Moderniation of the Ottoman Empire: Tanzimat and the Eastern Question
- Director, NEH Summer Institute for Secondary School Teachers, Summer 1990 on a Comparison Between the Imperial Institutions of the Ottoman Empire and Ming China
- Director, NEH Summer Institute for College Teachers, Summer 1992 on a Comparison Between the Imperial Institutions of the Ottoman Empire and Ming China

== Representative publications ==
=== Books ===
- Elementary Turkish, by Lewis V. Thomas, edited and revised by Norman Itzkowitz, (Harvard University Press, Cambridge, Massachusetts, 1967). Reprinted in revised edition by Dover Press, New York, 1985.
- Mübadele: An Ottoman-Russian Exchange of Ambassadors, (with Max Mote), (University of Chicago Press, New York, 1972).
- A Study of Naima, by Lewis V. Thomas, edited by Norman Itzkowitz, (New York University Press, New York, 1972).
- The Ottoman Empire: The Classical Age, by Halil Inalcik, trans. by Norman Itzkowitz and Colin Imber, (Weidenfeld and Nicolson, London, 1973).
- Ottoman Empire and Islamic Tradition, (A.A. Knopf Inc., New York, 1973). Reprinted by the University of Chicago Press, 1980. Turkish trans. Osmanlı İmparatorluğu ve İslami Gelenek, Çıdam Yayınları, 1989. Chinese translation, Chinese University of Kong, 1987.
- Psychological Dimensions of Near Eastern Studies, edited by L. Carl Brown and Norman Itzkowitz, (The Darwin Press, Princeton, N.J., 1977).
- The Immortal Atatürk: A Psychobiography, (with Dr. Vamık Volkan), (The University of Chicago Press, Chicago, Ill., 1984. Paperback edition, 1986. Turkish translation by Bağlam Press, Istanbul, 1998).
- Modernization in the Middle East: The Ottoman Empire and its Afro-Asian Successors, ed. Cyril E. Black and L. Carl Brown, (Darwin Press, Princeton, New Jersey, 1992).
- Turks and Greeks: Neighbours in Conflict with Vamık Volkan, (Eothen Press, Cambridge, England, 1994). Turkish translation, Bağlam Press, 1998.
- Richard Nixon: A Psychobiography, with Vamık Volkan and Andrew Dod, (Columbia University Press, New York, 1997).
- The Balkans (A study kit for high school students), (Golden Owl Press, Amawalk, New York, 2000).
- Vlad the Impaler: The Real Count Dracula (A Wicked History), (Franklin Watts, New York, 2008)

=== Articles ===
- "Eighteenth-Century Ottoman Realties", Studia Islamica, fas. 16, (1962), pp. 73–94.
- "Health, Education and Welfare—Ottoman Style", Midway, Vol., No. 3, (Winter 1968), pp. 59–68.
- "Kimsiniz Bey Efendi, or a Look at Tanzimat through Namier-colored Glasses", Near East Round Table, ed., R. Bayly Winder (New York University Press, 1969), pp. 41–52.
- "The End of the Ottoman Empire", History of the First World War, Vol. 8, No. 8 (1971), pp. 3351–3355
- "The Office of Şeyh ül-Islâm and Tanzimat: A Prosopographic Enquiry", (with Joel Shinder), Middle Eastern Studies, Vol. 8 (January 1972), No. 1, pp. 93–101
- "Ankara", Encyclopædia Britannica (1974), I, 927–34.
- "The Ottoman Empire", The World of Islam, ed. Bernard Lewis, (Thames and Hudson, London, 1976), pp. 273–300.
- "Men and Ideas in the Eighteenth- Century Ottoman Empire", Studies in Eighteenth-Century Islamic History, ed. By Thomas Naff and Roger Owen, (Southern Illinois University Press, Carbondale, Ill., 1977), pp. 15–26.
- "The Problem of Perspectives", Imperial Legacy, ed. by L. Carl Brown, (Columbia University Press, New York, New York, 1995), pp. 18–30.
- "Turkish and Greek Identities and a Comparison Between Them" (with Vamık Volkan), Proceedings of the First International Congress on Cypriot Studies, ed. by Emel Doğramacı, William Haney, Güray König, (Eastern Mediterranean University Press, 1997, Gazimağusa, Turkish Republic of Northern Cyprus) pp. 179–216.
- Long articles for Encarta on "The Ottoman Empire", "The Spread of Islam", "Istanbul"
