= Zübeyde Hanım =

Mother of Mustafa Kemal Atatürk

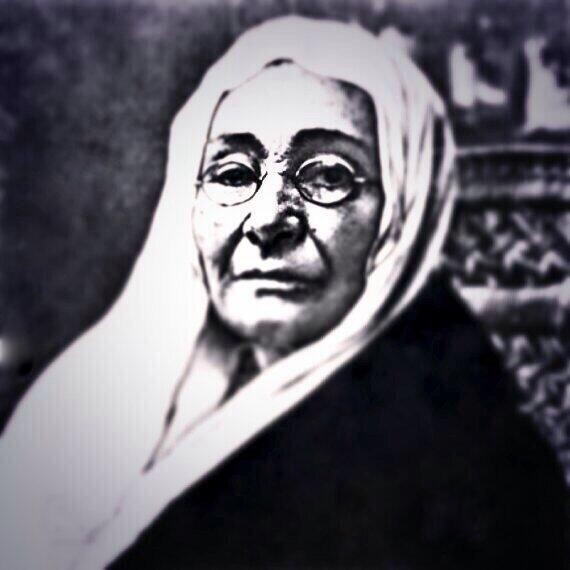
- Born: 1857; Langadas, Selanik, Ottoman Empire (present-day Lagkadas, Thessaloniki, Greece)
- Died: 14 January 1923 (aged 65–66); İzmir, Turkey
- Spouses: Ali Rıza Efendi (m. 1871; died 1888) Ragıp Bey (div. 1912)
- Children: Fatma, Ömer, Ahmet, Mustafa, Makbule, Naciye

Zübeyde Hanım (1857 – 14 January 1923) was the mother of Mustafa Kemal Atatürk, the founder of the Republic of Turkey. She was the only daughter of the Hacısofular family which included her two brothers. Zübeyde was born in Langada village (now in Thessaloniki regional unit), Ottoman Empire in 1857 as the daughter of a Turkish peasant. The Hacısofular family migrated to Macedonia after the collapse of the Karamanids.

== Early life ==
Zübeyde Hanım was born in 1857 in Lagkadas to a Turkish family, and according to other sources, she was of Turkic Yörük origin. Some alleged that she was of Slavic origin (Pomak/Torbeš) ancestry. It has been also claimed by some historians that she was of Albanian descent. Zübeyde spent her early life on a farm in what is today southern Albania, the daughter of a small tenant. She was described as blonde-haired, blue-eyed, and of robust stature. This ethnic background is believed to have influenced her son, Mustafa Kemal, later known as Atatürk.

Zübeyde Hanım's education was basic and only consisted of learning to read and write. Because she could read and write, she was nicknamed Zübeyde Molla (someone knowledgeable and teaches other people, in particular, a teacher of theology) by some people.

Zübeyde Hanım was a devout Muslim and as a result of her pious upbringing she enrolled her son Mustafa in a local school (mahalle mektebi), an Islamic school that teaches the Qur'an.

Zübeyde Hanım's first marriage in 1871 was to Ali Rıza Efendi. She was 14 or 15 years old and he was 32. With her dark blonde hair, deep blue eyes and fair skin, she won the admiration of Ali Rıza, a border guard. Ali Rıza's older sister arranged this marriage - as was the tradition at that time. Zübeyde Hanım was in her early teens and 20 years younger than her husband. Their first child was Fatma, followed by Ömer and Ahmet, but they all died in childhood. In 1881, she gave birth to a son Mustafa, and a daughter, Makbule in 1885.

Zübeyde Hanım, also gave birth to a daughter Naciye in 1889, but she died of tuberculosis in childhood.

== Zübeyde and Kemal ==
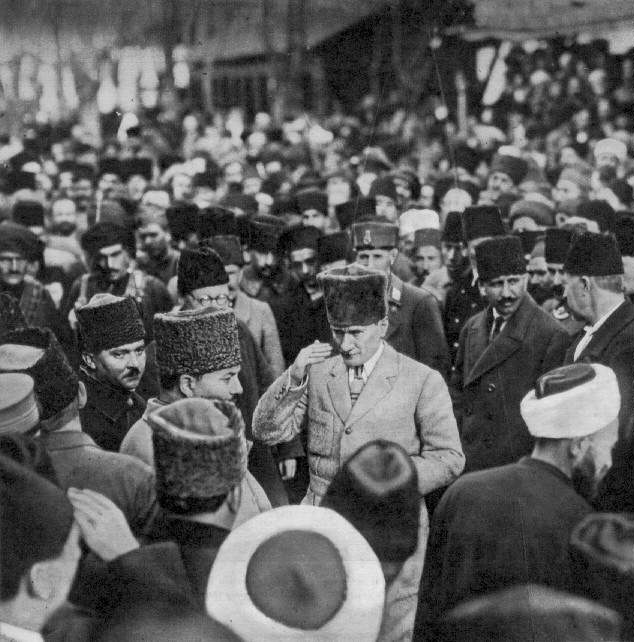
Kemal on the day his mother died.

She was widowed at a young age, as her husband died when their son Mustafa was six years old.

Following his death, Zübeyde Hanım moved with her two children, Mustafa and Makbule to live with her brother, Husein, who was the manager of a farm outside Salonica.

In her second marriage she was married to Ragıp Bey, who had four children from his previous marriage. She could not see Mustafa Kemal during the Turkish War of Independence in 1919.

== Later life ==
After the Balkan Wars, when the Ottomans lost Salonica to Greece, she moved to a house in Beşiktaş-Akaretler, Istanbul with her daughter Makbule. She moved to Ankara in 1922, but the climate was not suitable for her, so she was sent to İzmir.

She died on 15 January 1923, and a memorial was built for her in 1940, where she rests now.
