= Atatürk (disambiguation) =

Atatürk is an honorific surname given to Mustafa Kemal Atatürk, the founder of modern Turkey.

Atatürk may also refer to:

- Atatürk, biographical film about him
- Atatürk Airport, the airport in Istanbul, named after him
- Atatürk Arboretum, Istanbul
- Atatürk Boulevard, Ankara
- Atatürk Bridge, Istanbul
- Atatürk Centennial, 1981
- Ataturk Channel, Australia
- Atatürk Cultural Center, Istanbul
- Atatürk Cup, a former football competition
- Atatürk çiçeği ("Atatürk flower"), the name of the poinsettia in Turkey
- Atatürk Dam, southeastern Turkey
- Atatürk Forest, Florya, Istanbul
- Atatürk Forest, Israel
- Atatürk Forest Farm and Zoo, Ankara
- Atatürk Government Model High School, Bangladesh
- Atatürk High School, Ankara
- Atatürk High School of Science, Istanbul
- Atatürk High School, İzmir
- Atatürk Monument (disambiguation)
- Atatürk Museum (disambiguation)
- Atatürk Olympic Stadium, Istanbul
- Atatürk Park, Mersin
- Atatürk Reservoir, southeastern Turkey
- Atatürk Residential Area, the Netherlands
- Atatürk Square, Turkmenistan
- Atatürk Square, Cyprus
- Atatürk Stadium, Eskişehir
- Atatürk Stadium, İzmir
- Atatürk Stadium, Nicosia
- Atatürk University, Erzurum
- Kamal Ataturk Avenue, Bangladesh
- Mustafa Kemal Atatürk Plaza, Santiago, Chile
