= List of forests in Israel =

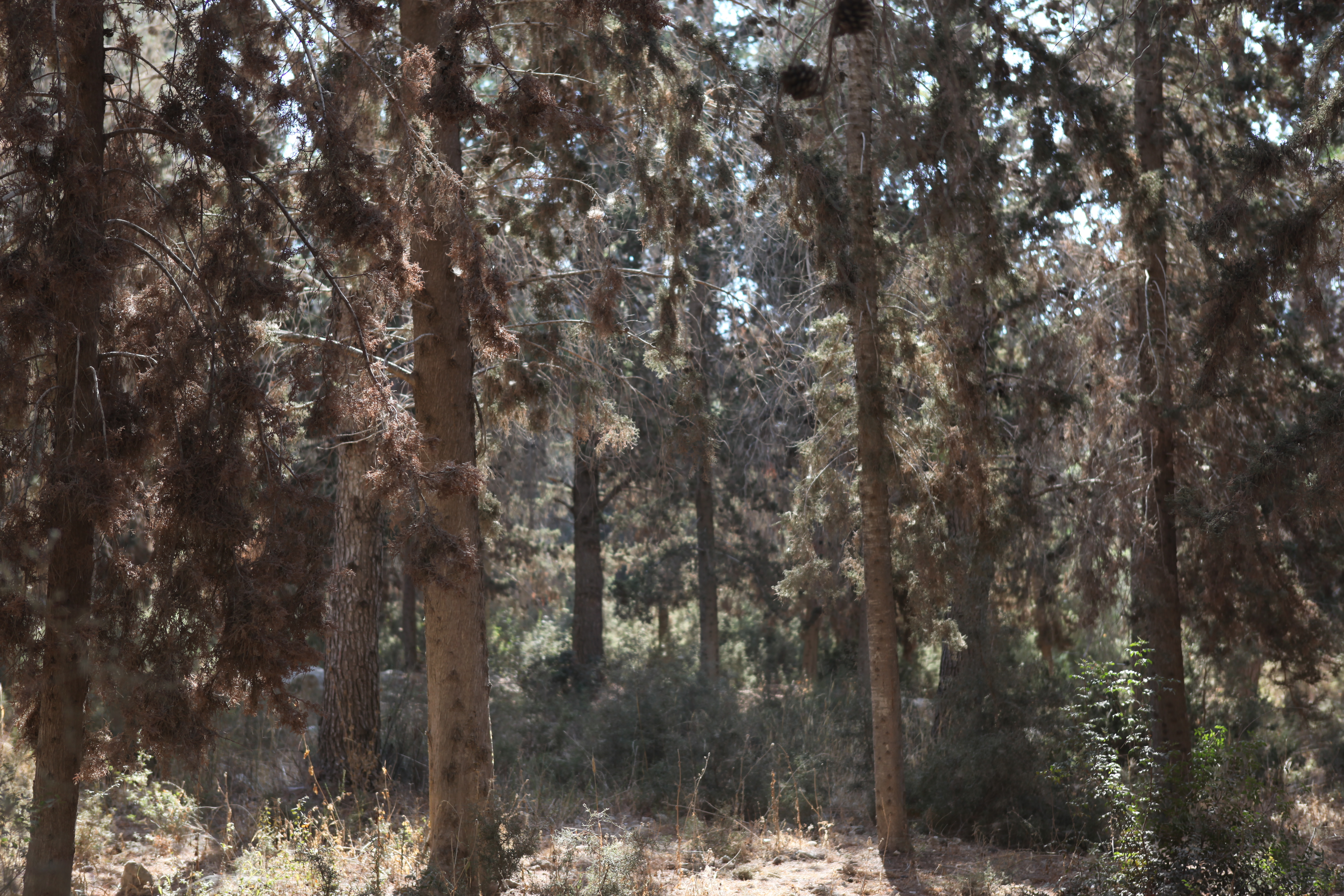
Ben Shemen Forest

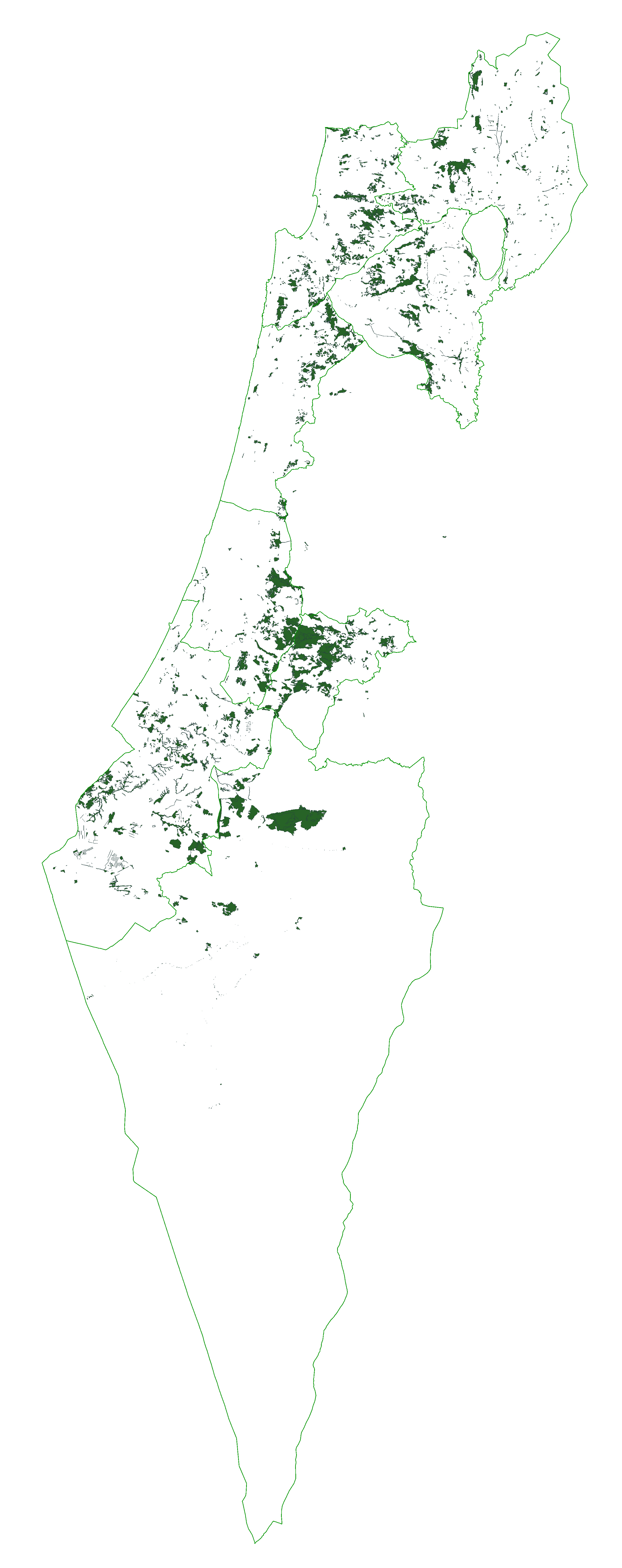
Map of planted forests in Israel

The forests of contemporary Israel are mainly the result of a massive afforestation campaign by the Jewish National Fund (JNF). This article is a list of these forests.

In the 19th century and up to World War I, the Ottoman Empire cleared the land of Israel of its natural reserves of pine and oak trees, in order to build railways across the empire. Since it was founded the JNF has planted in Israel more than 260 million trees creating 280 forests, and still operates today.

== Northern District ==
=== Galilee ===
==== Upper Galilee ====
- Ahihud Forest – (Acre-Safed Road near Mt. Gamal)
- Baram Forest – (Shlomi-Sasa Road, near Meron Junction)
- Biriya Forest – (Safed-Biriya Road)
- Lower Hanita Forest – (Shlomi-Hanita Road)
- Mt. Shehumit (Har Nahash) - (Kiryat Shmona)
- Parod Forest – (Acre-Safed Road, near Kibbutz Parod)
- Segev Forest

==== Lower Galilee ====
- Beit Keshet Forest
- Lavi Forest – (Golani Interchange)
- Mt. Turan – (near Golani Interchange-Mitzpe Netofa)
- Swiss Forest
- Tiberias Forest

=== Carmel ===
- Atatürk Forest - Mount Carmel
- Carmel Coast Forest – (Fureidis-Haifa Road)
- Hadera Forest – (near Hadera railway station)
- Irron Forest – (Hadera-Megiddo Road)
- Mt. Hurshan – (near Amikam)

== Central District ==
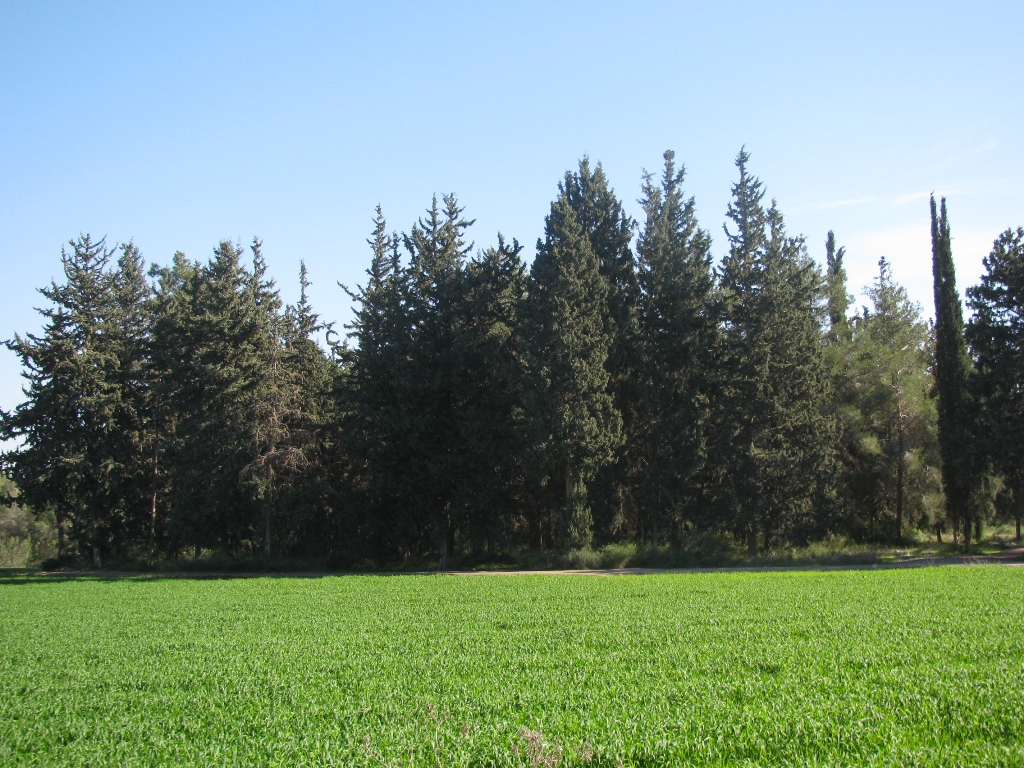
Ben Shemen Forest

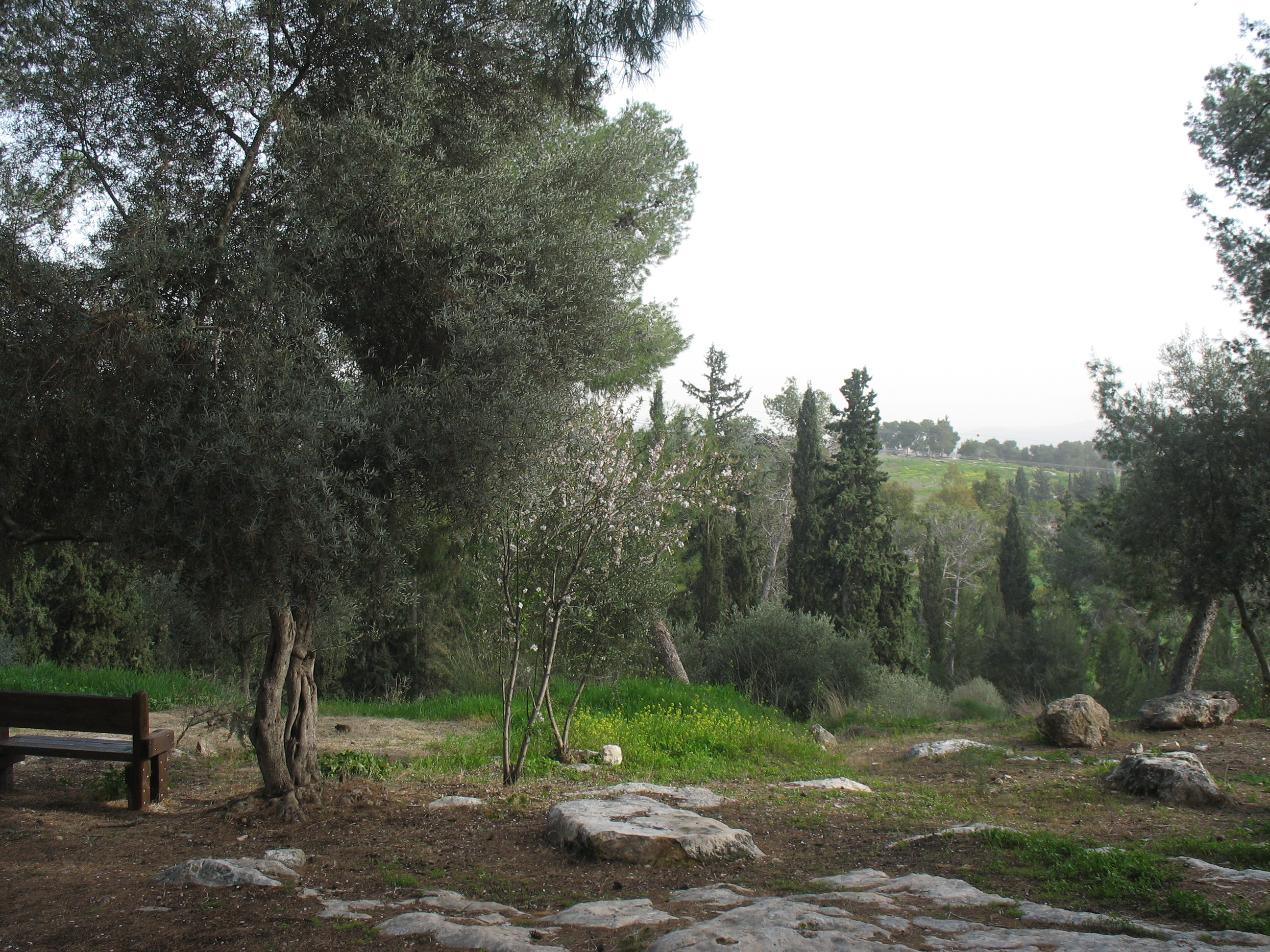
Hulda Forest

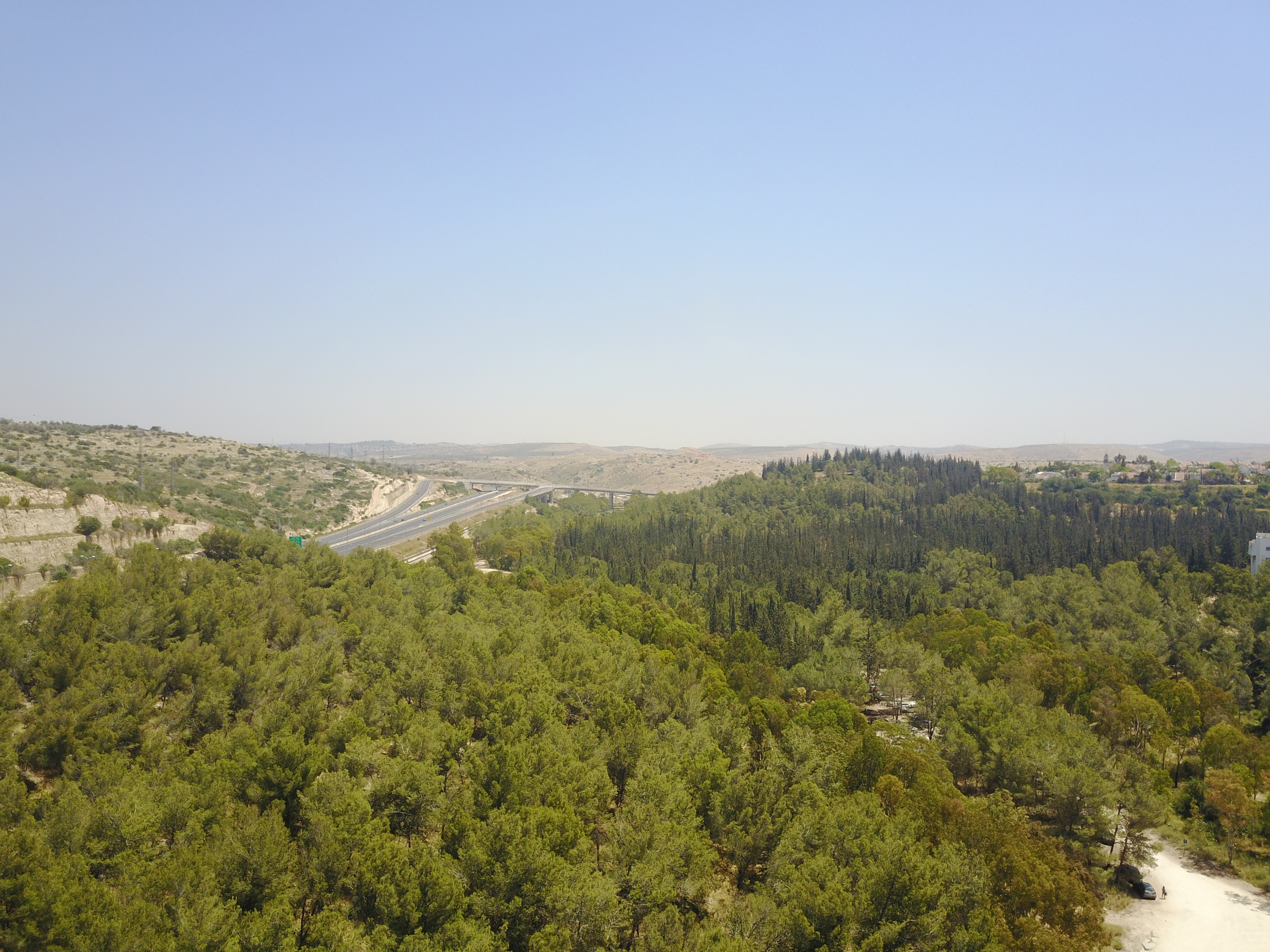
Rosh HaAyin Forest

- HaKo"ach Forest (Kula Forest) - A small forest surrounding the city of Elad
- Rosh HaAyin Forest - A small forest surrounding the city of Rosh HaAyin
- Shoham Forest - A small forest east of the town of Shoham

=== Shephelah ===
- Ben Shemen Forest – (east of Ben Shemen youth village)
- Haruvit Forest - A medium-sized forest east of Kibbutz Kfar Menahem
- Hulda Forest – (Nahshon Junction – Rehovot road) Planned in 1907 by the Jewish National Fund, which brought in a German agronomist, Louis Barish, to manage the project. Restored in 1998.
- Meginim Forest - Gezer region
- Modiin Forest - The eastern and southern sections of the Ben Shemen Forest
- Tzora Forest – (between Shimshon and Nahshon Junctions) near Tzora

== Jerusalem District ==
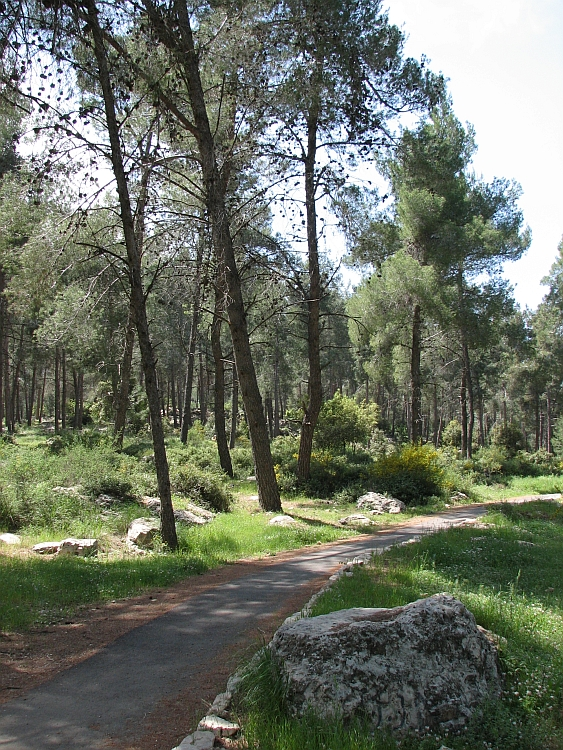
Aminadav Forest

- Aminadav Forest – Judean hills near Aminadav
- Canada Forest – Jerusalem corridor
- Eshtaol Forest - near Beit Shemesh
- Gilo Forest – (Gilo neighborhood)
- Jerusalem Forest – (between Givat Shaul neighborhood and Ein Karem)
- Martyrs Forest – (above Moshav Ksalon (Shimshon-Sha'ar HaGai Junction)
- Peace Forest – (below East Talpiot promenade)
- Ramot Forest – (between Ramot neighborhood and Shu'afat)

== Southern District ==
- Amatzia Forest – near moshav Amatzia
- Melachim Forest, Shachariya – (between Kiryat Gat and Lakhish Junction)
- Plugot Forest - A small forest west of the city of Kiryat Gat near the Plugot Junction

=== Negev ===
- Be'eri Forest – (on Road No. 232 near Be'eri from Hodiya Junction (Road No. 232) off Zikim-Karmia Road)
- Lahav Forest – (northern Negev)
- Yatir Forest – (northeast Negev)

== See also ==
- National parks and nature reserves of Israel
- Agriculture in Israel
