= Atatürk Forest =

Atatürk Forest may refer to:

- Atatürk Forest (Florya), a forest in Istanbul, Turkey
- Atatürk Forest (Israel), a forest planted by immigrants from Turkey in Israel
