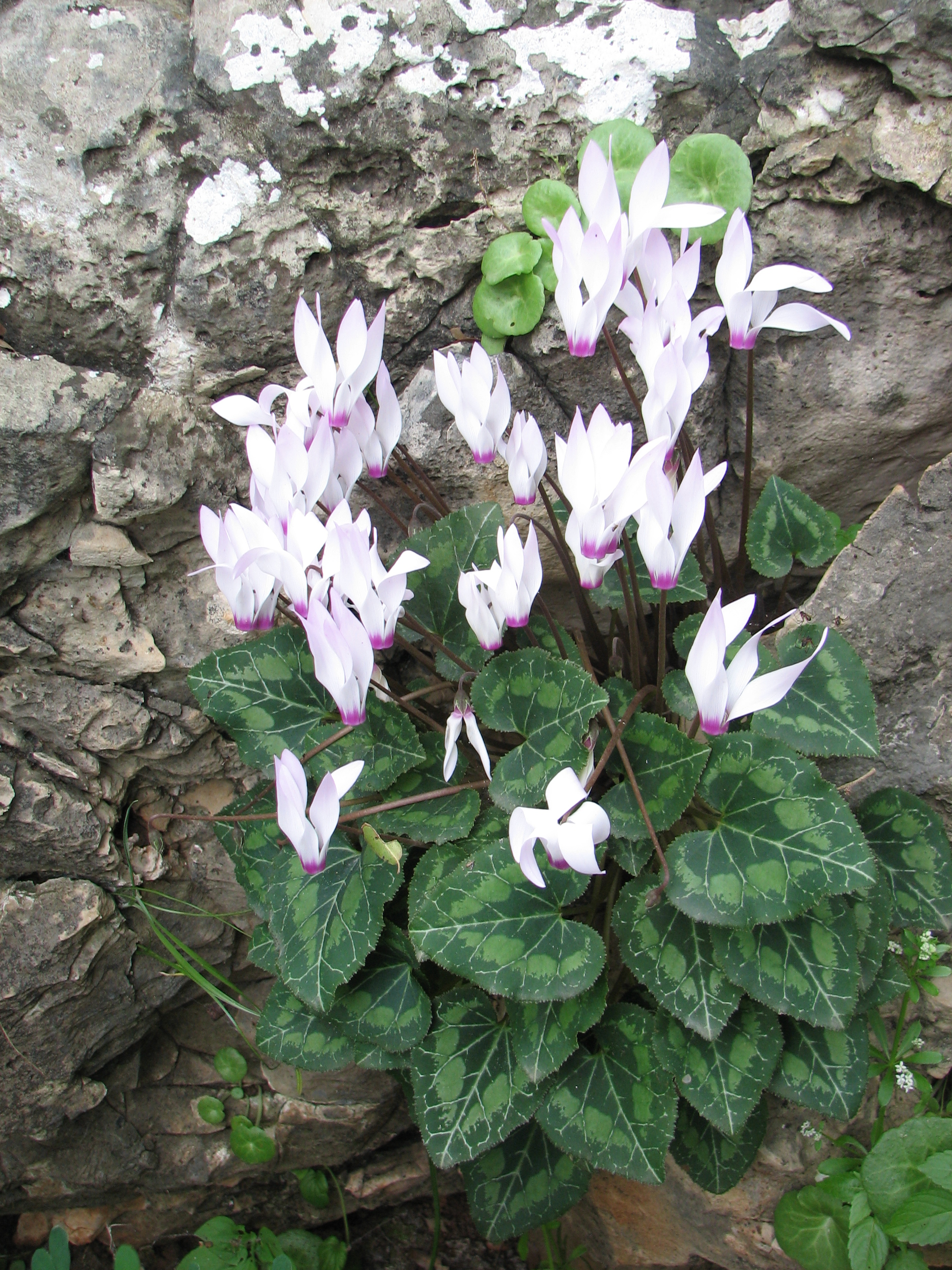
- A typical wild form along the green path between Yagur and Nesher, Israel

Scientific classification
- Kingdom: Plantae
- Clade: Tracheophytes
- Clade: Angiosperms
- Clade: Eudicots
- Clade: Asterids
- Order: Ericales
- Family: Primulaceae
- Genus: Cyclamen
- Species: C. persicum

Binomial name
- Cyclamen persicum Mill.

Synonyms
- Cyclamen albidum Jord.; Cyclamen aleppicum Fisch. ex Hoffmanns.; Cyclamen antiochium Decne.; Cyclamen hederaceum Sieber ex Steud.; Cyclamen latifolium Sm.; Cyclamen persicum f. albidum (Jord.) Grey-Wilson; Cyclamen punicum Pomel; Cyclamen pyrolifolium Salisb.; Cyclamen tunetanum Jord.; Cyclamen utopicum Hoffmanns.; Cyclamen vernale Mill.; Cyclamen vulgare Champy; Cyclaminus persica (Mill.) Asch.

= Cyclamen persicum =

Species of flowering plant in the primrose family

Cyclamen persicum, the Persian cyclamen, is a species of flowering herbaceous perennial plant growing from a tuber, native to rocky hillsides, shrubland, and woodland up to 1,200 m (3,900 ft) above sea level, from south-central Turkey to the Levant. Cultivars of this species are the commonly seen florist's cyclamen. Due to their native habitat (North Africa and the eastern part of the Mediterranean,) the flower thrives best in a climate and temperatures common in this region: summers which are hot and dry and winters which are wet and cool. In spite of their name, which means "from Persia," they are not actually from Persia.

== Description ==
Cyclamen persicum is a perennial, herbaceous plant that reaches heights of about 32 cm (13 in). Wild plants have heart-shaped, fleshy leaves, up to 14 cm (6 in) usually green with lighter markings on the upper surface. The leaf underside may be pale green or reddish. The leaf margin is slightly thickened and usually serrated. As a storage and persistence organ, C. persicum forms a perennial hypocotyl tuber. It arises solely through a thickening of the hypocotyl, the shoot axis area between the root neck and the first cotyledon. The rounded, slightly flattened tuber is about 4 to 15 cm (1.6 to 5.9 in) or more in diameter. It is of corky consistency. The roots spring from the underside, and the tops of the spirally arranged, long-stalked leaves of the plant spring from the top.

=== Flowers ===
Flowers bloom from winter to spring (var. persicum) or in autumn (var. autumnale) and have 5 small sepals and 5 upswept petals, usually white to pale pink with a band of deep pink to magenta at the base. Cyclamen carry on individual stems standing flowers that hang down but whose petals are bent strongly upwards. In the species, flowers are sweetly scented, but the scent has been lost in cultivated forms.

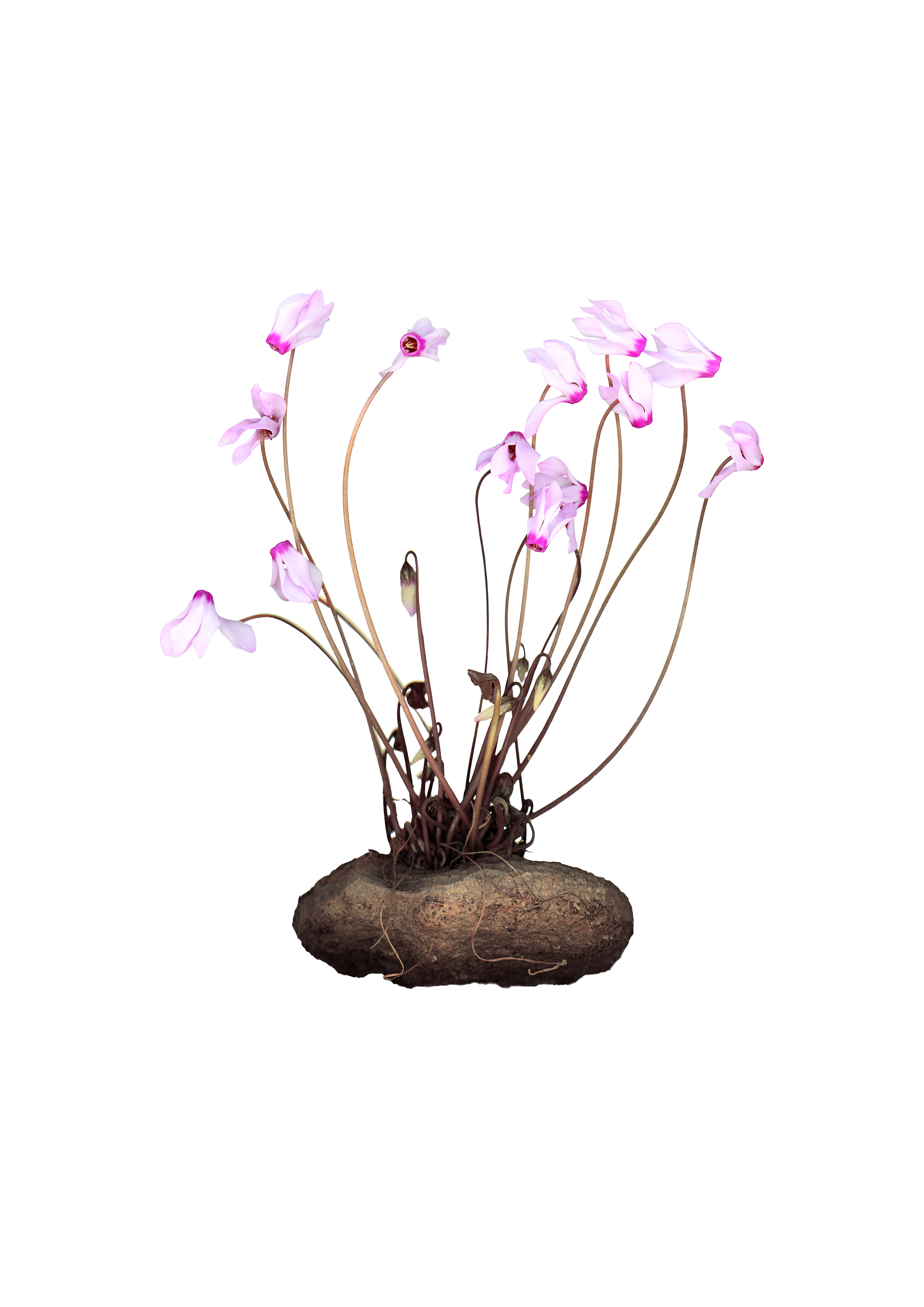

=== Fruit ===
After pollination, the flower stem curls downwards slightly as the pod develops, but does not coil as in other cyclamens. Plants go dormant in summer. The fruits are capsules, which are sunk into the ground with increasing maturity, by waxing and curling of the stem. The capsules only open when they are in the ground.

== Varieties and forms ==
There are two natural varieties and several named forms, distinguished by flowering time and predominant petal color.

- C. persicum var. persicum (winter- and spring-flowering — all of range)
- C. persicum var. persicum f. persicum (white to pale pink)
- C. persicum var. persicum f. albidum (pure white)
- C. persicum var. persicum f. roseum (rose-pink)
- C. persicum var. persicum f. puniceum (red to carmine)
- C. persicum var. autumnale (autumn-flowering)

== Protected Status ==
In Israel, it flourishes in several locations: the Golan Heights, Ben Shemen Forest, Carmel Forest, and the northern Negev desert. Although it is widespread, Israeli legislation has granted it a protected status: to delight the eye but not to pick. In neighboring countries, such as Jordan and Lebanon, protective status focuses on plants and trees which are endangered, and therefore does not include Cyclamen persicum.

== Distribution and habitat ==
The natural range of C. persicum extends from North Africa across Southeast Europe to West Asia. In particular, the following occurrences are documented: In North Africa, the species is represented in the northern and eastern parts of Algeria and in northern Tunisia. In Western Asia, stocks were confirmed in Cyprus, Lebanon, the Palestine region, western Syria and western Turkey.

The plant also grows in Algeria and Tunisia, and on the Greek islands of Rhodes, Karpathos, and Crete, where it may have been introduced by monks. The plant was also brought to Malta for gardening purposes, and is now naturalized in both old gardens and cemetery landscaping.

The preferred habitats include pine forests, oak thickets and open rocky slopes mostly on calcareous soils up to an altitude of 1,000 metres (3,300 ft). In the summer months, the high temperature and the dryness lead to the death of the aerial plant parts. The plants outlast the dry season as shallow subterranean tubers. They then resume growth at the beginning of the colder season.

== Cultivars ==
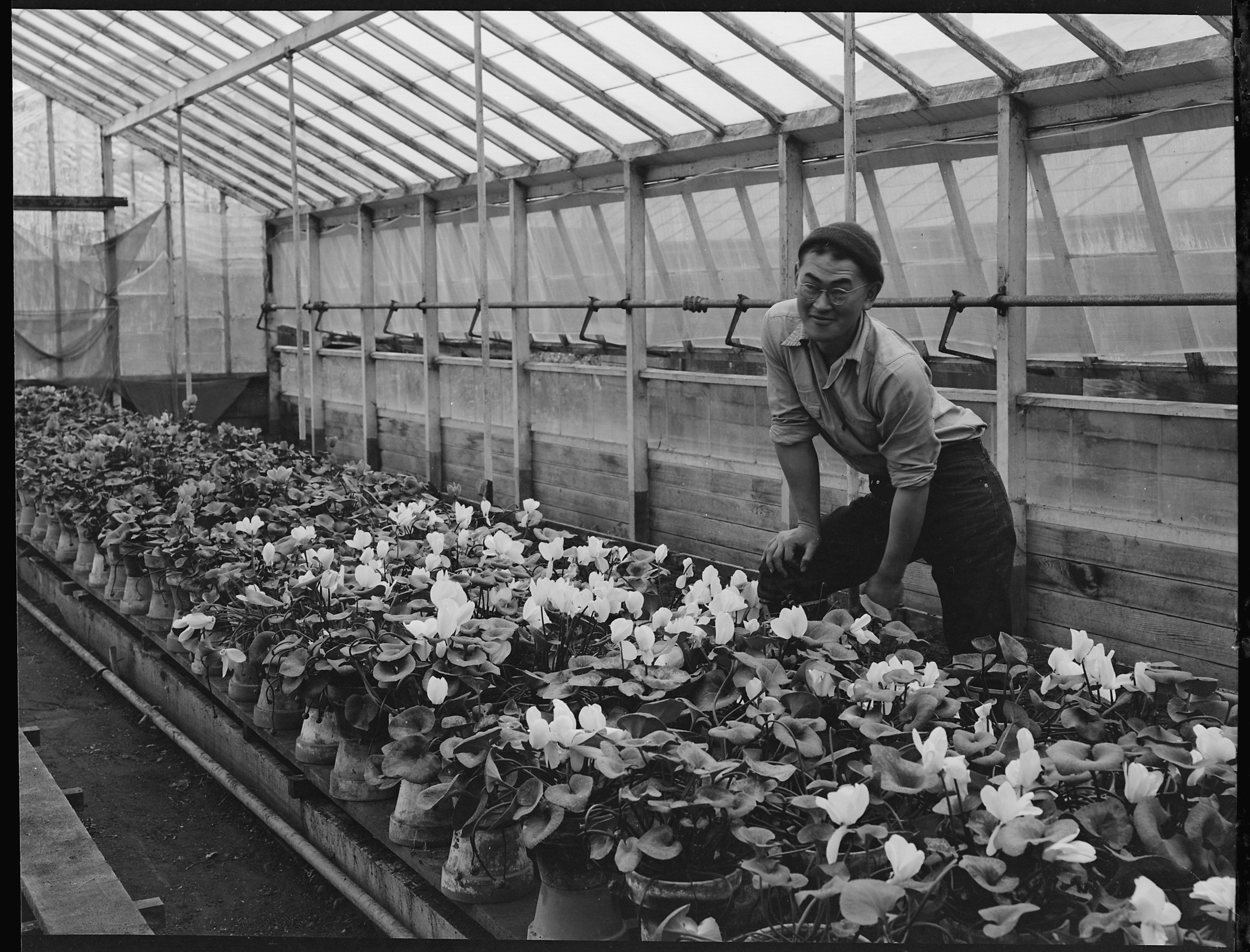
Cyclamen persicum cultivars in a Californian nursery operated by Japanese horticulturalists

The following is a selection of cultivars. All are frost-tender, and best grown under glass in temperate regions:

- 'Concerto Apollo'
- 'Halios Bright Fuchsia'
- 'Halios Violet'
- 'Halios White'
- 'Laser Rose'
- 'Laser Salmon with Eye'
- 'Laser Scarlet'
- 'Laser White'
- 'Miracle Deep Rose'
- 'Miracle Scarlet'
- 'Miracle White'
- 'Sierra Fuchsia'
- 'Sierra Light Purple'
- 'Sierra Pink with Eye'
- 'Sierra Scarlet'
- 'Sierra White with Eye'

== Uses ==
This species probably arrived in Paris before its first mention in 1620. Certainly, it has been cultivated since 1731 in France. The start of the variety breeding is dated to the 1860s, starting from England. The different varieties of it were created exclusively by breeding with variants of the wild species. An introgression of other species has not occurred.

Common names in a variety of languages refer to the digestion of the flower by pigs: sowbread in England, pain de pourceau in France, and pan porcino in Italy.

As a potted plant, the species is a popular Valentine's Day gift, due to its red, heart-shaped leaves (some leaves are lavender, pink, or white). It is also a favorite at Christmas time.

Cyclamen persicum has a dark-brown tuberous root which is semi-poisonous. In some cultures, the tubers were used in making soap, as they generate a lather when mixed with water. The Bedouins of Mandate Palestine used to collect the root, and after grating it, would mix it with lime and sprinkle it over the surface of lakes or other large bodies of water known to contain fish. These poisonous mixtures would stun fish, which would then come to the surface and be collected by the fishermen. Such methods, as well as fishing with explosives, which came into use in the early 20th century, were banned by the British Mandate authorities. Palestinians use the leaves of the plant to make stuffed leaves. However, dermatitis can result from physical contact with the plant, and ingestion may cause diarrhea and regurgitation. It is also a hazard to pets, causing the same symptoms as in humans, and more: potential heart abnormality, convulsions, and even death. Due to its unpleasant flavor, ingestion is typically uncommon.

Cyclamen are propagated by seeds. The seeds are most likely to germinate when very fresh, as they do not remain viable for long. Cyclamen are dark germs, so the seed is covered with soil and placed in near or total darkness. The best germination temperature is 18 °C (64 °F). The germination period is 20 to 30 days. After germination, the seed boxes are highlighted. With good care, the plants can live to about 20 to 30 years old.

== Cultural relevance ==
Legend has it that King Solomon's crown was made from the flower's blossoms. Hence, "Solomon's crown" is one of its names known among Arabic and Hebrew speakers. During the Babylonian Exile, the bent flowers became symbolic of mourning over the destruction of the First Temple. In Christianity, the flowers' physical shape are symbolic of Mary mourning Jesus, and the heart-shaped leaves as emblematic of her broken heart. This explains why the flower is often a decorative element in churches devoted to Mary; one Arab name given is bakhūr Maryam 'Mary's incense'.

People around the Mount Carmel region would thread flowers into decorative necklaces resembling a sheep's scruff or mane; the flower is sometimes named kharūf "sheep" after this.

In medieval times, a traditional belief warned pregnant women against striding over a cyclamen, lest she miscarry. This may be related to a common understanding (scientifically true) that the toxic tubers of the flower could lead to abortion. Medieval herbal medicine even held that wearing the tuber around one's neck on a string could cause a fetus to abort.

Although the red anemone is now Israel's national flower, prior to 2013, that honor went to cyclamen persicum. It had gained significance among Israelis with the 1921 song "Rakefet, Rakefet" by Levin Kipnis, in memory of the New Yishuv's Battle of Tel Hai.

== Gallery ==
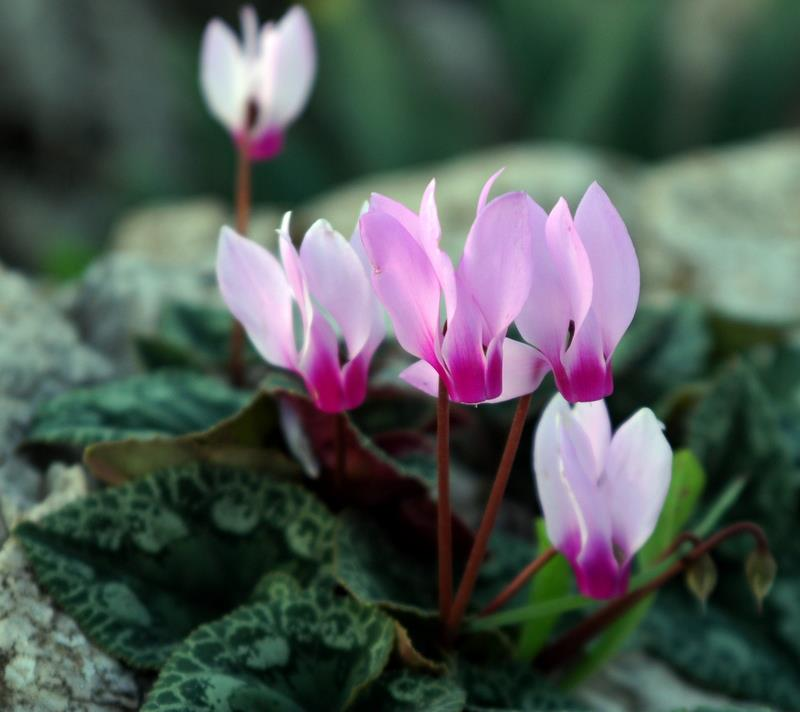
A flowering plant in Nazareth

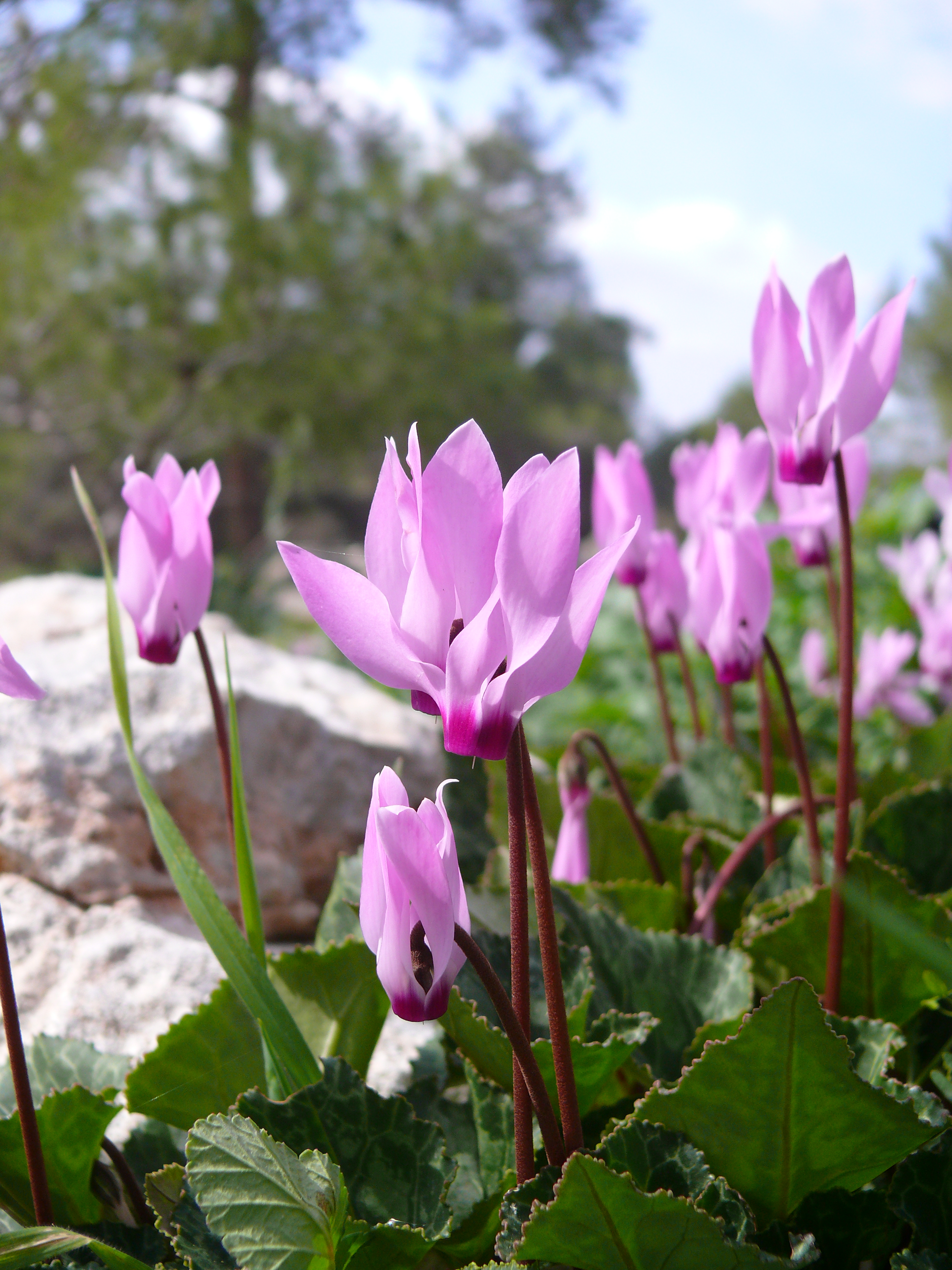
A flowering plant in the Eshtaol Forest in Israel

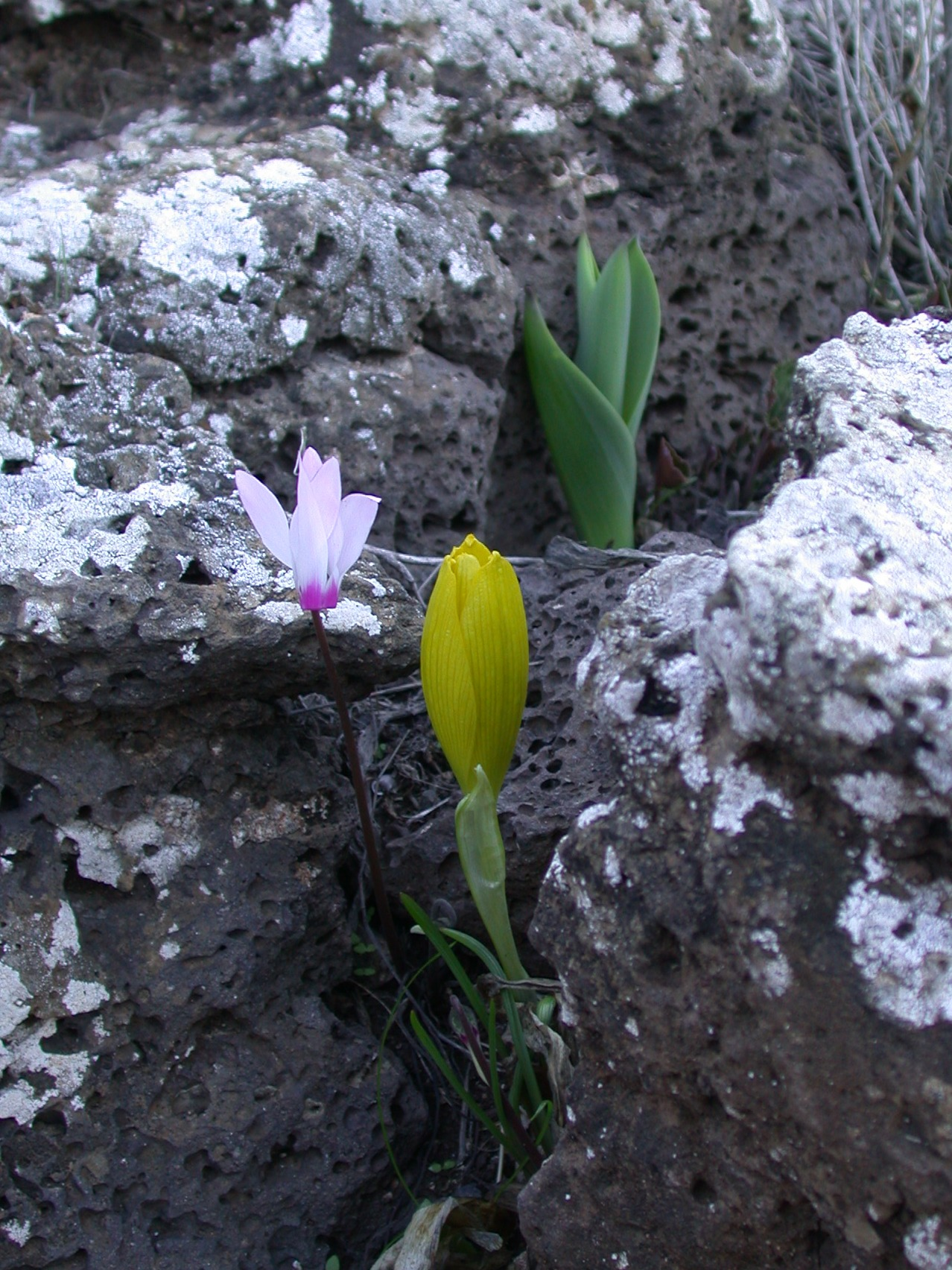
The autumn-flowering variety (C. persicum var. autumnale) with Sternbergia clusiana in the Golan Heights

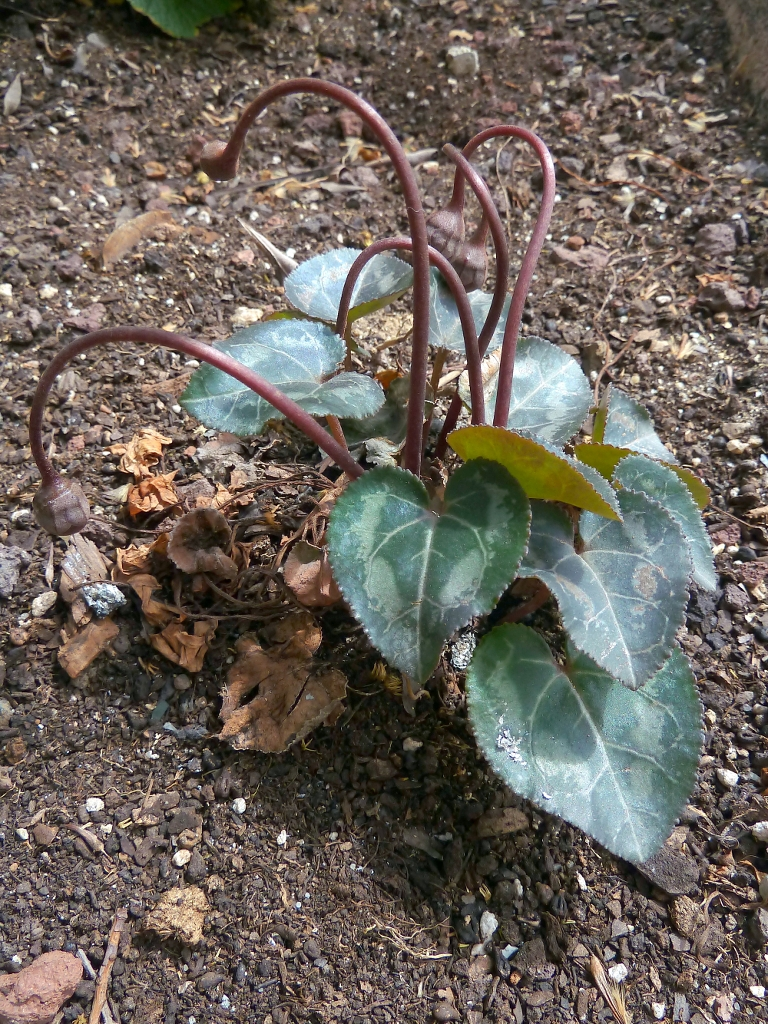
Pollinated flowers of a cultivated specimen of C. persicum, showing stem curling

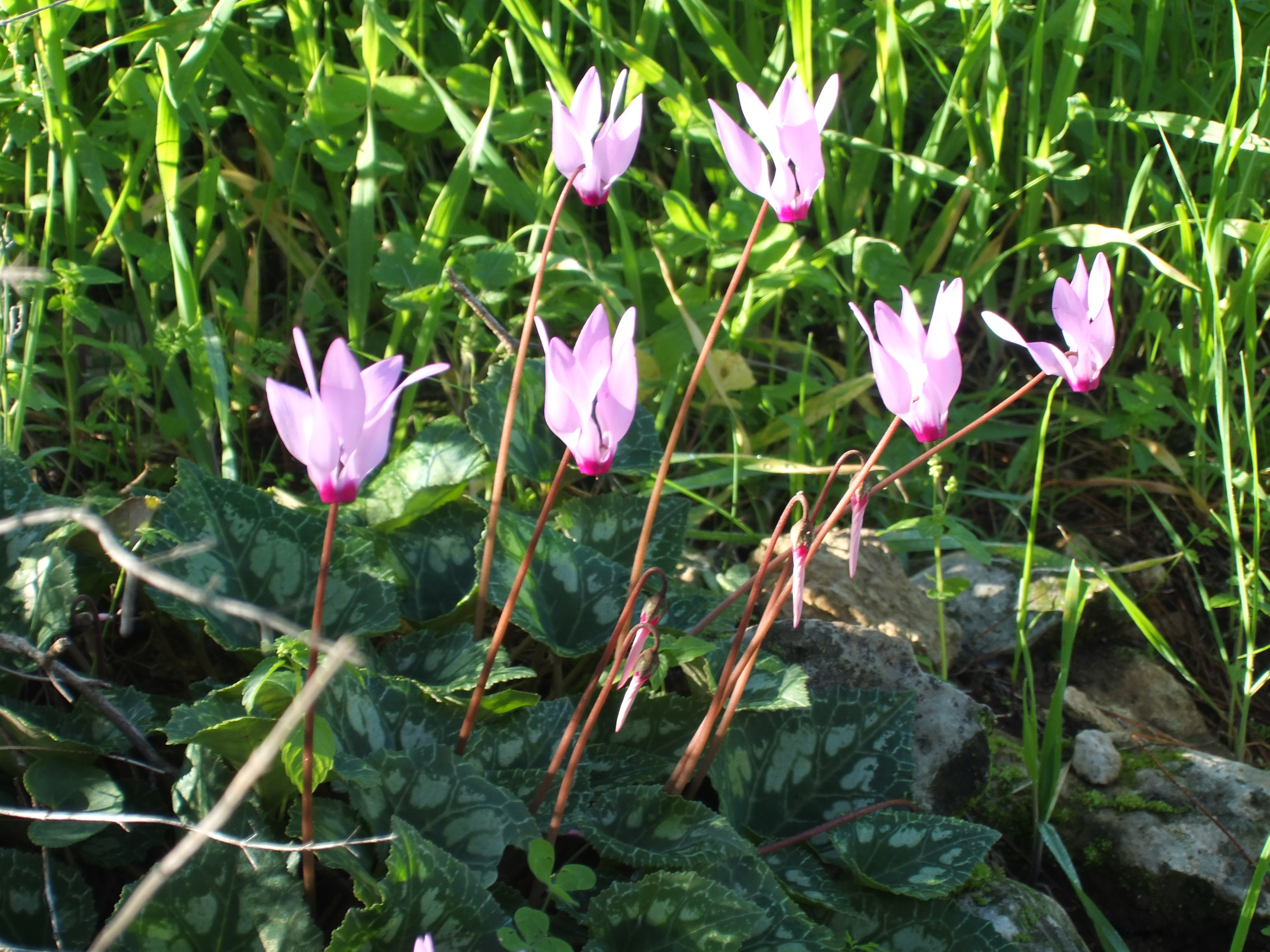
Cyclamen persicum in Israel

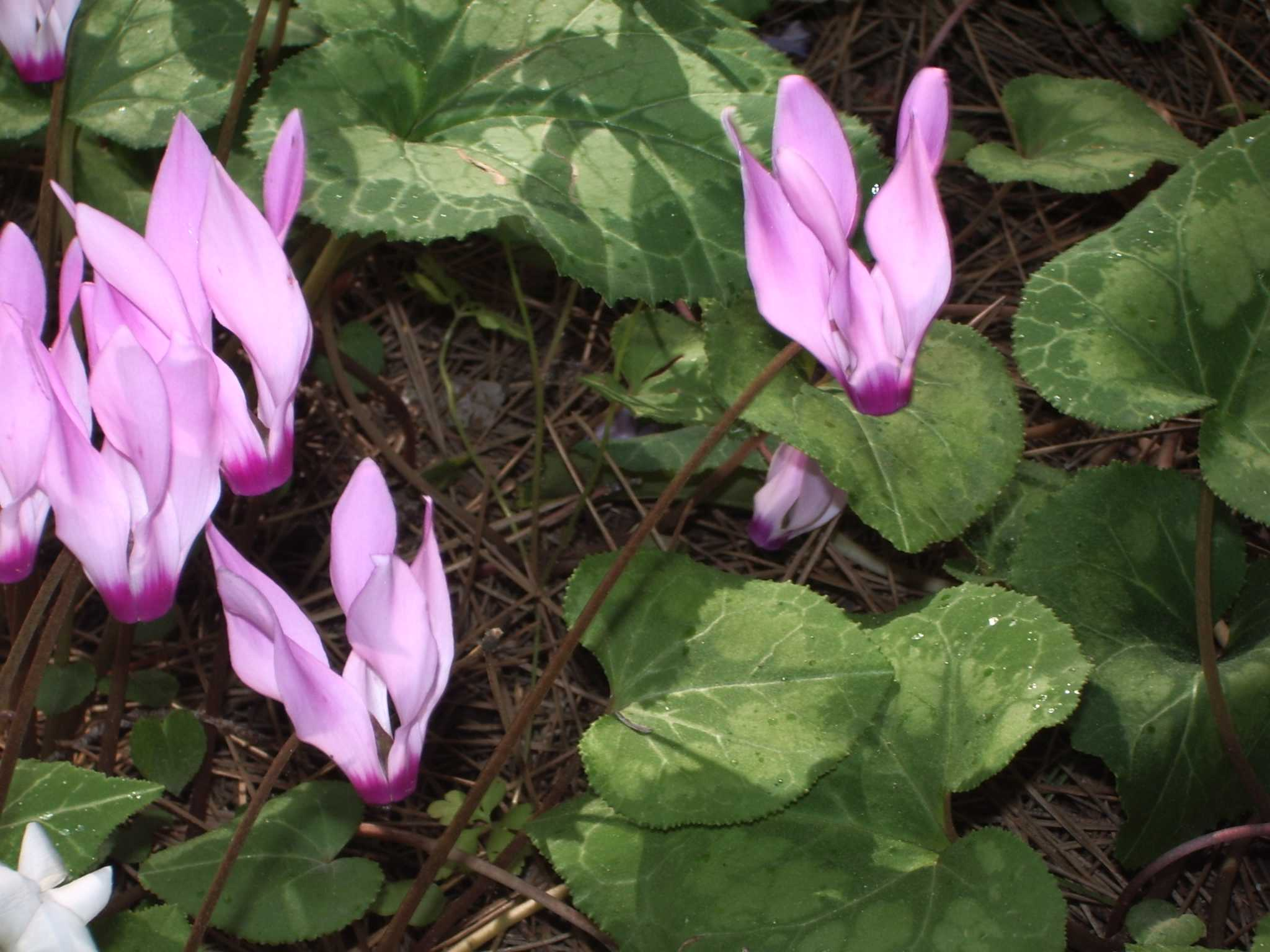
In the wild

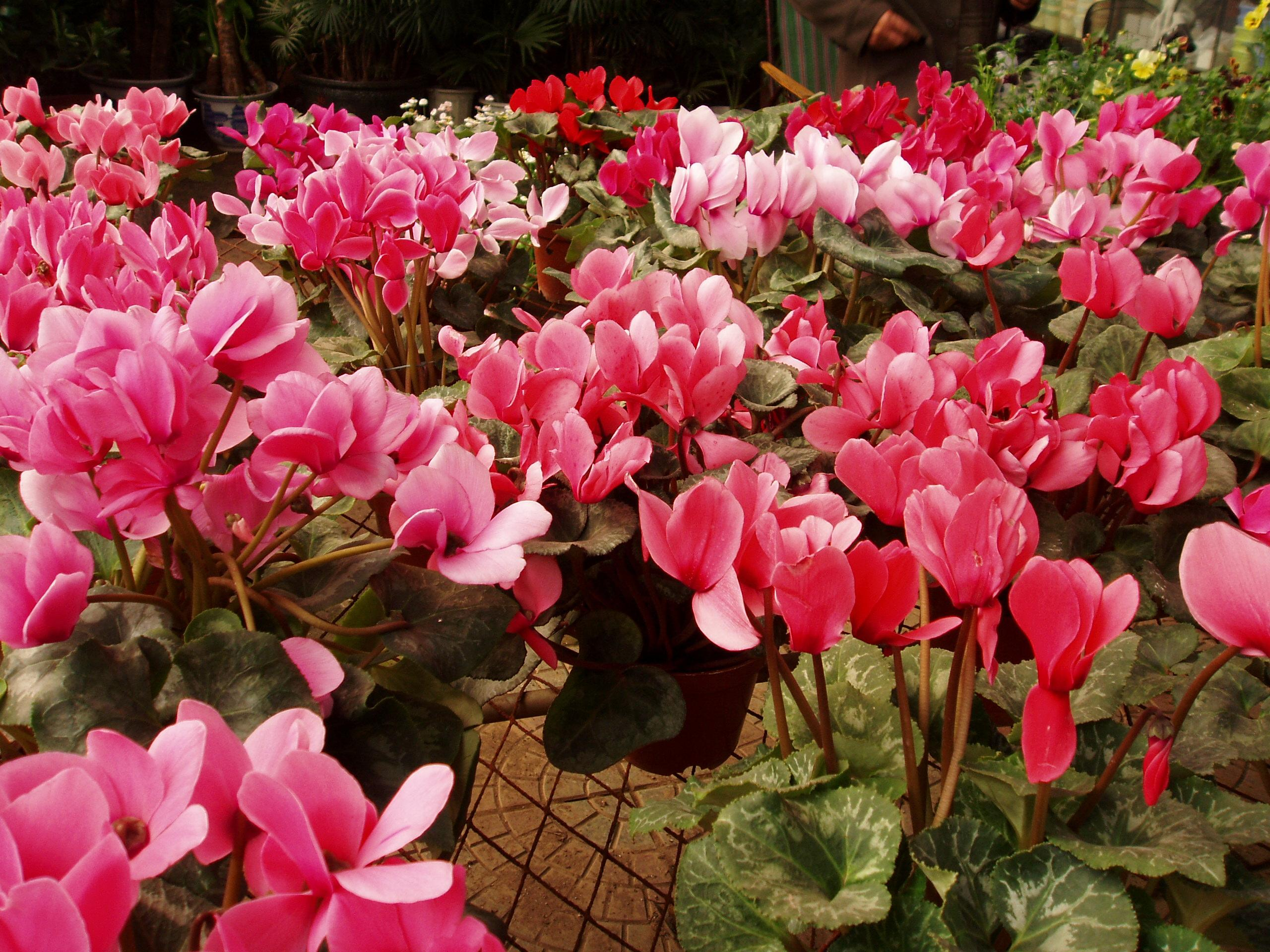
Cultivars at a garden centre

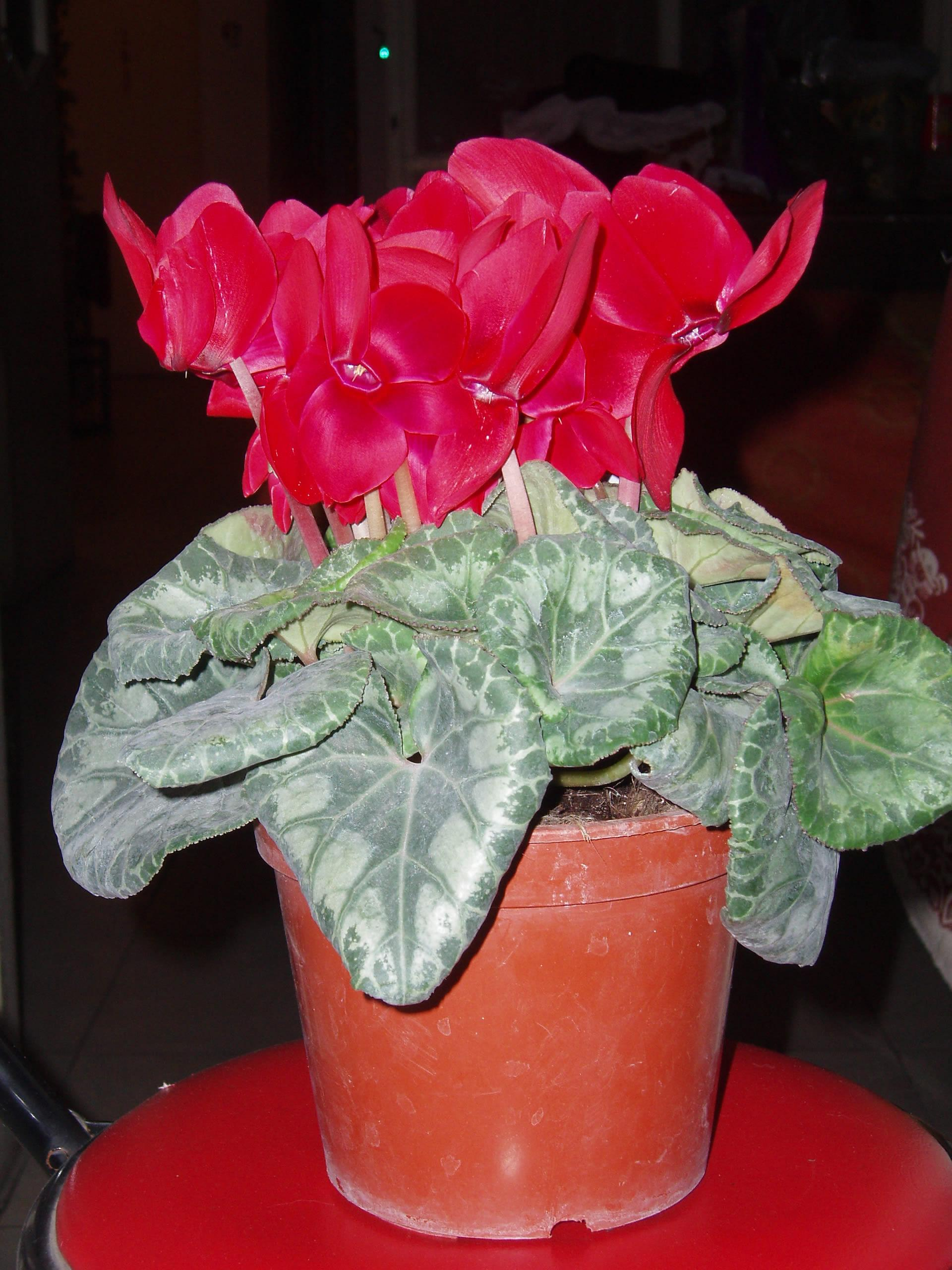
Rose coloured variety

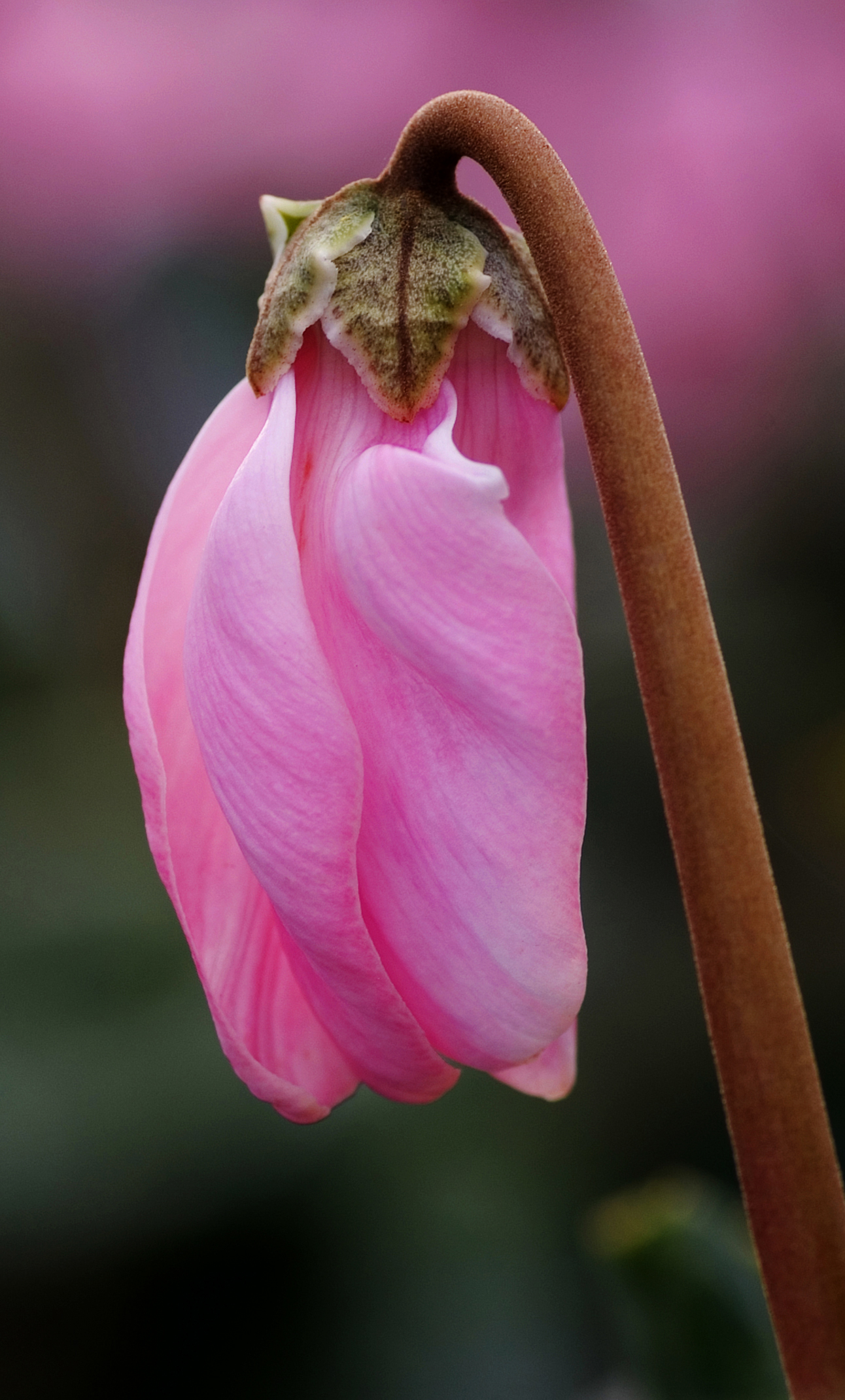
Emerging flower

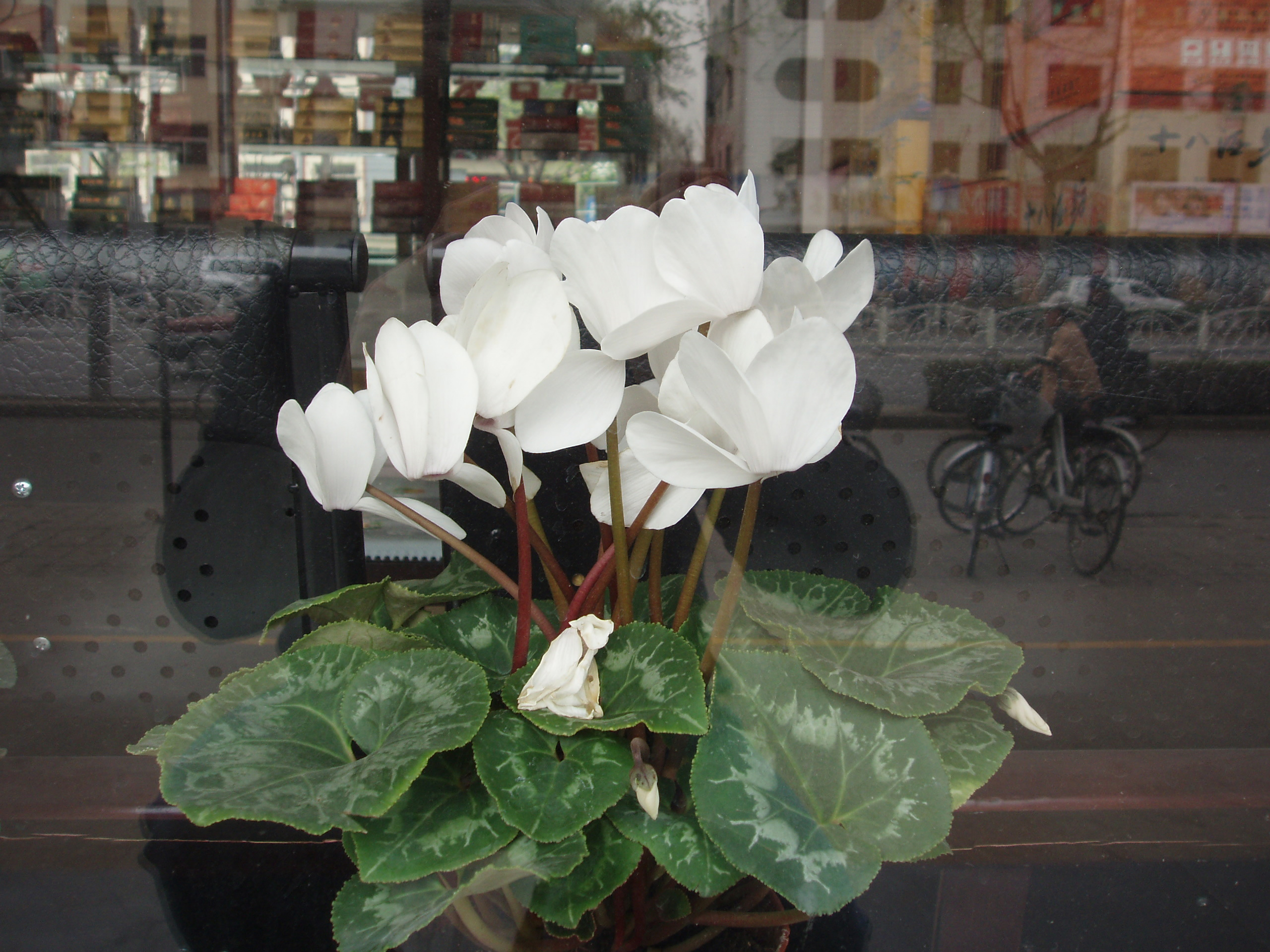
White flowers
