= Centennial =

Celebration at the 100th anniversary of an event

A centennial, or centenary in British English, is a 100th anniversary or otherwise relates to a century.

== Notable events ==
Notable centennial events at a national or world-level include:

- Centennial Exhibition, 1876, Philadelphia, Pennsylvania. First official World's Fair in the United States, celebrating the 100th anniversary of the signing of the Declaration of Independence in Philadelphia. About 10 million visitors attended, equivalent to about 20% of the population of the United States at the time. The exhibition ran from May 10, 1876, to November 10, 1876 (it included a monorail).
- New Zealand Centennial Exhibition, 1939–1940, celebrated one hundred years since the signing of the Treaty of Waitangi in 1840 and the subsequent mass European settlement of New Zealand. 2,641,043 (2.6 million) visitors attended the exhibition, which ran from 8 November 1939 until 4 May 1940.
- 1967 International and Universal Exposition, better known as Expo 67, celebrating Canada's centennial year. This "Category One" World's Fair held in Montreal, Quebec, Canada, from April 27 to October 29, 1967. Sixty-two nations participated, and it set the single-day attendance record for a world's fair, with 569,500 visitors on its third day. Official attendance was 50,306,648. Was endpoint of the Centennial Voyageur Canoe Pageant, the longest canoe race in history. (Its monorail was a major attraction.)
- Atatürk Centennial, in memory of Mustafa Kemal Atatürk's (founding president of Turkey) 100th birthday.
- 1996 Summer Olympics, 100th anniversary of the 1st Summer Olympics in 1896.
- Philippine Centennial, 100th anniversary of the proclamation of Philippine Independence.
- 100th Anniversary of Samastha Kerala
- First World War centenary, 2014–2018, began with the centenary of the outbreak of World War I and ended with the Armistice Day centenary.
- 100th Anniversary of the Xinhai Revolution and Republic of China
- 100th Anniversary of the Independence of Albania
- 100th Anniversary of the Independence of Finland
- 100th Anniversary of Warner Bros., Disney and Hasbro.
- 100th Anniversary of the Republic of Turkey
- 2024 Summer Olympics, 100th anniversary of the 1924 Summer Olympics and the 1924 Winter Olympics.

== Other events ==
Selected regional or other centennial events include:

=== Argentina ===
- Argentina Centennial (1910)

=== Australia ===
- Centenary of Western Australia, in 1929, which included the Western Australian Centenary Air Race across Australia.
- 1934 Centenary of Melbourne

=== Canada ===
- Canadian Centennial (1967)
- Centennial of the City of Toronto

=== Ireland ===
- Decade of Centenaries

=== Peru ===
- Centennial of the Independence of Peru (1921)

=== Philippines ===
- Iglesia ni Cristo Centennial (2014)

=== United States ===
- American Civil War Centennial
- Oregon Centennial
- Texas Centennial Exposition
- United States Centennial

== See also ==
- Generation Z
- Sesquicentennial
