= Aminadav =

Aminadav: עַמִּינָדָב (Hebrew); عميناداف / عميناداڤ (Arabic)

Hebrew transcription(s)
  - Official: Amminadav
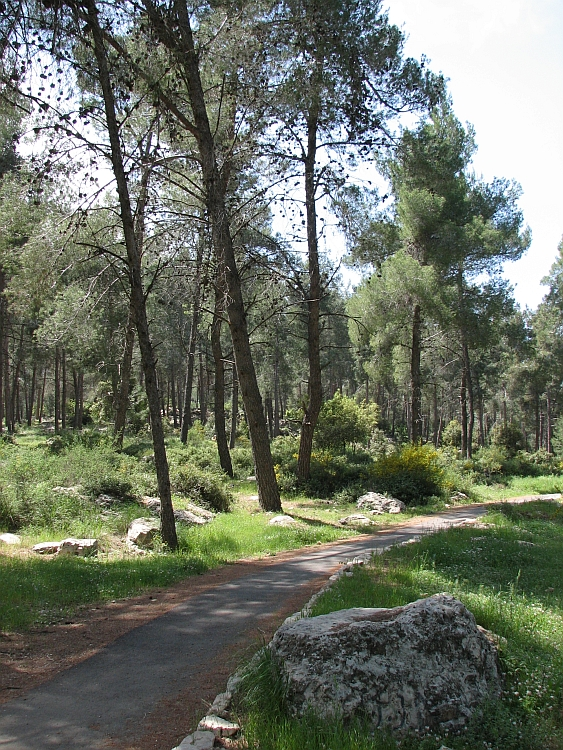
- Aminadav forest
- Etymology: Named after Amminadab
- Location within Jerusalem District
- Coordinates: 31°45′5″N 35°8′33″E
- Country: Israel
- District: Jerusalem
- Council: Mateh Yehuda
- Affiliation: Moshavim Movement
- Founded: 1950
- Founder: Yemenite Jews
- Population (2024): 945

Aminadav (Hebrew: עַמִּינָדָב) is a moshav in central Israel. Located southwest of Jerusalem near Yad Kennedy, it falls under the jurisdiction of Mateh Yehuda Regional Council. In 2024 it had a population of 945.

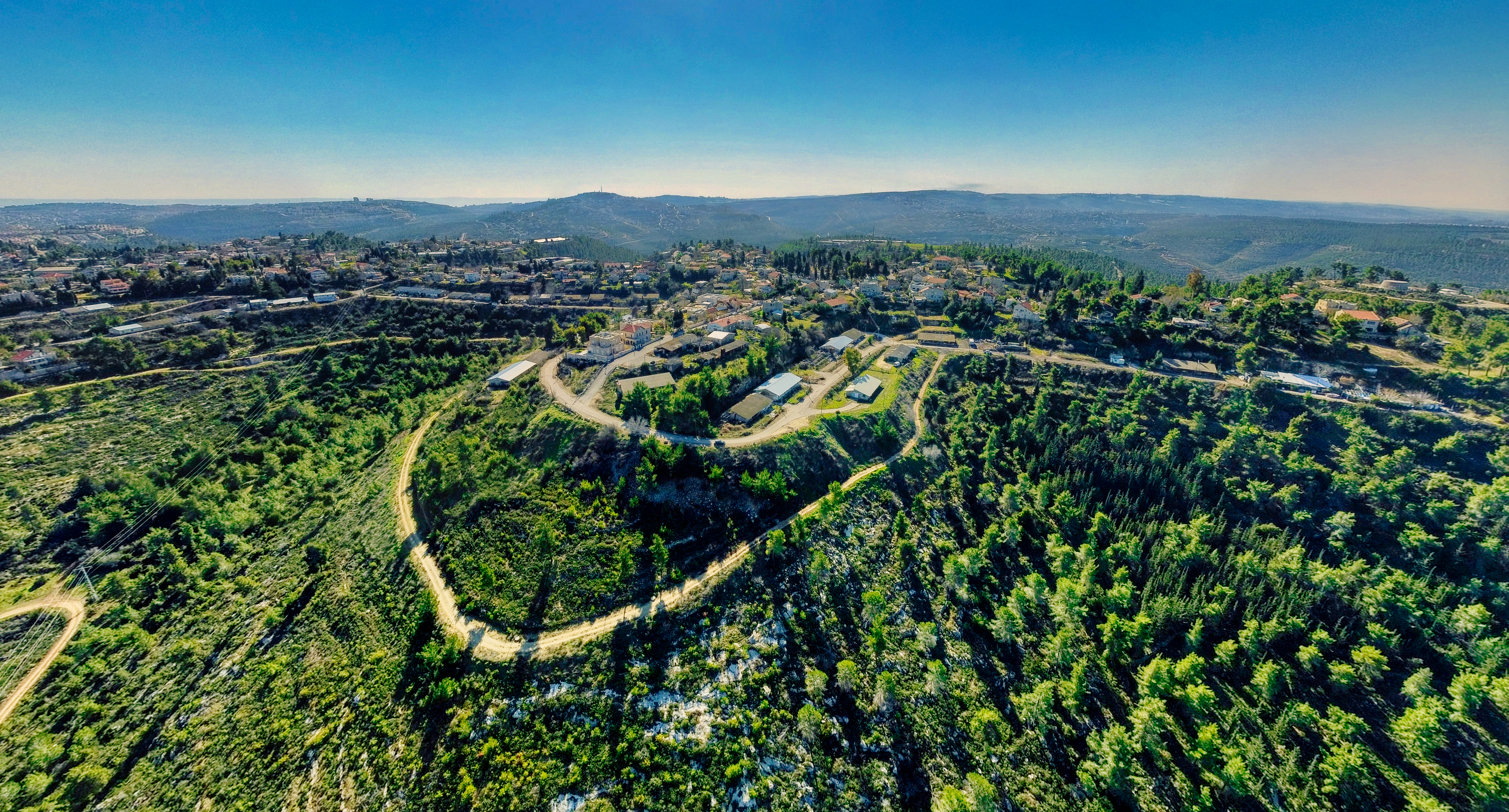
Aminadav

== Etymology ==
The name "Aminadav" is a combination of two Hebrew words; "Ami"- my nation, and "Nadav"- generous, giving, or volunteering; thus Aminadav translates "a generous people" and the moshav is named after the biblical figure Aminadav, who, according to the Book of Ruth (4: 18–22), was one of King David's ancestors. His son, Nahshon, is considered by tradition in the Talmudic tractate Sotah (36:2-37:1) to be the first person who agreed to cross the Red Sea after the Exodus from Egypt.

== History ==
Aminadav was located on land that had previously belonged to the Palestinian village of al-Walaja before the 1948 Arab-Israeli War. The village was established in 1950 by Yemeni Jews. Between 1952 and 1953 it absorbed more immigrants from North Africa as well as some native Israelis.

The moshav faced shortages and poor security. In its early years, it saw hunger, political disputes, water scarcity, clan conflicts, and relocations of several families.

== Aminadav forest ==
The Aminadav Forest, spread over 7 km^{2} (700 ha), is a combination of natural woodland and trees planted by the Jewish National Fund along the Salmon-Sorek contour. The forest overlooks the Sorek and Refa`im riverbeds and the Jerusalem hills. In the forest are several natural springs, ancient agricultural terraces, orchards, ancient wine presses and chalk pits. The Lord Sacks forest is a forest of 25,000 trees being planted within the Aminadav forest by the JNF, UK. It is named for Chief Rabbi of the United Hebrew Congregations of the Commonwealth, Lord Jonathan Sacks.

== See also ==
- List of forests in Israel
