= Atatürk Centennial =

Centennial declared by the United Nations and the UNESCO

The Atatürk Centennial was declared in 1981 by the United Nations and UNESCO in honor of the centennial of Mustafa Kemal Atatürk's birth. 1981 was declared The Atatürk Centennial Year and the Resolution on the Atatürk Centennial was adopted.

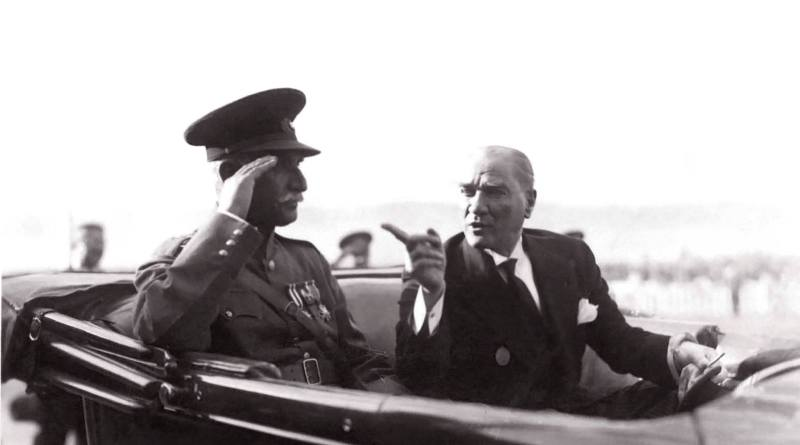
Mustafa Kemal Atatürk, 1934

The centennial was officially celebrated between 19 May 1981 and 19 May 1982, with the Turkish Government organizing and supporting a series of events, symposiums and conferences in several countries stretching over a longer span of time. A considerable number of scholars published books about his achievements as a result.

== Text ==
The Resolution on the Atatürk Centennial is as follows:

The General Conference,

Convinced that eminent personalities who worked for international understanding, co-operation, and peace, should serve as an example for future generations,

Recalling that the hundredth anniversary of the birth of Mustafa Kemal Atatürk, the founder of the Republic of Turkey, will be celebrated in 1981,

Bearing in mind that he was an exceptional reformer in all the fields coming within Unesco's competence,

Recognizing in particular that he was the leader of one of the earliest struggles against colonialism and imperialism,

Recalling that he set an outstanding example in promoting the spirit of mutual understanding between peoples and lasting peace between the nations of the world, having advocated all his life the advent of ‘an age of harmony and co-operation in which no distinction would be made between men on account of colour, religion or race’,

1. Decides that Unesco shall co-operate on the intellectual and technical planes with the Turkish Government for the organization in 1980, at that Government’s financial expense, of an international symposium designed to bring out various aspects of the personality and work of Atatürk, the founder of the Republic of Turkey, whose action was always directed towards the promotion of peace, international understanding and respect for human rights;

2. Requests the Director-General to take the necessary steps for the implementation of this resolution.

== Congresses and conventions organized in commemoration ==
- November 1980, The Atatürk International Conference organized by Boğaziçi University with Afet İnan and Turhan Feyzioğlu as speakers among others
- April 1981, The Ankara University Faculty of Education
- April 1981, The Atatürk Symposium at the Turkish Naval Academy in Istanbul
- May 1981, The Atatürk Conference organized by the Ministry of Energy and Turkish Petroleum
- May 1981, The Second International Atatürk Conference at Istanbul University with speakers Frank Tachau, François Georgeon, Sadi Irmak and Kemal Karpat among others
- May 1981, International Symposium on Atatürk organized by Işbank with speakers Dankwart Rustow, Jerzy Wiatr, and William Hale among others
- May 1981, on Turkish Art and Architecture at the University of Chicago
- October 1981, Atatürk International Research Conference at the College of Charleston, with Talat Halman as speaker among others
- October 1981, Atatürk's Turkey Conference organized by the American Turkish Society and the University of New York City with Bernard Lewis and J. C. Hurewitz as speakers among others
- October 1981, Atatürk Centennial Symposium organized by the University of Toronto with Talat Halman and Kemal Karpat as speakers
- October 1981, Atatürk and the Modernization of Turkey organized by the Hebrew University in Jerusalem with speakers Jacob Landau, Frank Tachau and William Hale as speakers
- November 1981, International Atatürk Symposium organized by UNESCO with speakers Dankwart Rustow, Sarvepalli Gopal and S.N. Eisenstadt
