= William Mathew Hale =

William Mathew Hale (born 1940) is a specialist on Turkey and Turkish politics, and Professor of Politics (with reference to Turkey) at the School of Oriental and African Studies, University of London.

After an MA from the University of Oxford, he was awarded a PhD at the Australian National University. He was at one time lecturer at Durham University and its Centre for Middle Eastern and Islamic Studies. Professor Hale is Chair of the Centre for International Studies and Diplomacy at SOAS, convenor of the Modern Turkish Studies Programme at the London Middle East Institute, and is currently a faculty member at Sabancı University. His book Turkish Foreign Policy 1774-2000 has been received as authoritative and comprehensive. Hale is currently teaching a politics course in Turkish issues, POLS 310: Turkey and Its Neighbours, at Otago University.

== Writing ==
His work includes:

=== Books ===
- Country case study: the Republic of Turkey (1978)
- The political and economic development of modern Turkey (London 1981)
- Turkish politics and the military (Routledge 1994)
- Turkish Foreign Policy 1774-2000 (Frank Cass 2000 - second edition 2002)
- Turkey, the United States and Iraq (London Middle East Institute 2005)

=== Chapters ===
- Turkey in The Cold War and the Middle East ed. Y Sayigh and A Shlaim (OUP 1997)
- Turkey and Transcaucasia in Central Asia Meets the Middle East (London 1998)
- Turkey: Economic Issues and Foreign Policy in Turkey's New World: Changing Dynamics in Turkish Foreign Policy ed. D Menashri and S Saiyari (Washington Institute 2000)
- Turkey and the European Union: the Long Road to Membership in Turkey in World Politics: an Emerging Regional Power ed. B Rubin and K Kiirisci (London 2001)
- Democracy and the Party System in Turkey in Turkish Transformation: New Century, New Challenges ed. B W Beeley (2002)
- Human Rights, the European Union and the Turkish Accession Process in Turkey and the European Union ed. A Carkoglu and B Rubin (2003)

== Sources and notes ==
- SOAS staff profile
- Copac
- British Council in Turkey
