= Atatürk Square, Ashgabat =

Square in Ashgabat, Turkmenistan

Atatürk Square
- Urban park
- Owner: City of Ashgabat
- Location: Between Chary Nurymow Street and Gorogly Street; Ashgabat, Turkmenistan
- Location of Ashgabat
- Coordinates: 37°56′09.7″N 58°23′11.2″E

Atatürk Square is a park named after Mustafa Kemal Atatürk, founder of the Turkish Republic located in the center of Ashgabat.

It is about 500 meters East of the Independence Square. It is bordered by Gorogly street in the North, H.Babayev Street in the west and Chary Nurymow Street in the south.

A statue of Ataturk is in located at the center of the square.

== Atatürk commemoration ==
On the 72nd anniversary of his death, Mustafa Kemal Atatürk was remembered in a commemoration ceremony at Atatürk Square. A moment of silence was held by the participants which included officials from the Turkish Embassy, members of the Turkmen Foreign Ministry, members of the Mejlis, representatives from Turkish companies, students and teachers of the local Turkish schools. The commemoration takes place every year on the death day of Atatürk when flowers are laid at the monument to Atatürk in the middle of the square commemorating the day in remembrance of Mustafa Kemal Atatürk.
