= Haruvit Forest =

Forest in Israel

Coordinates: 31.736°N 34.860°E

Haruvit Forest (Hebrew: יער חרובית) is a public forest located in the southern coastal plain and Judean foothills region of Israel. Managed by the Jewish National Fund (KKL-JNF), the forest spans an area along Highway 383 and serves as a regional center for outdoor recreation, historical tourism, and adaptive sports.

== Geography ==
The forest is situated in south-central Israel, between the 7 km and 8 km markers of Highway 383, approximately two kilometers east of Kibbutz Kfar Menahem. Its territory extends southward from the highway for a length of roughly five kilometers, terminating near the Bulgaria Forest parking facility. Geographically, Haruvit Forest lies in close proximity to Tel Mikne (ancient Ekron), British Park, and Beit Guvrin National Park.

== History and archaeology ==
The forest terrain contains various historical and agricultural remains, notably the Winepress Trail and the Boulder Trail. Archaeological and agricultural features within the forest boundaries include ancient cisterns, agricultural terraces, and the ruins of Hurvat Shimra. The southern and western borders of the forest lie adjacent to Tel Tzafit National Park, which contains the prominent archaeological site of Tel Tzafit, widely identified as the ancient Philistine city of Gath. The landscape also preserves traditional regional agriculture, including extensive olive and carob groves.

== Recreation and accessibility ==
Haruvit Forest is highly developed for public recreation, accommodating hiking, mountain biking, and overnight camping. The forest features several marked trails, most notably the Winepress Trail (Hebrew: שביל הגתות) and the Boulder Trail (Hebrew: שביל בין הסלעים), which are renowned for their seasonal winter and spring wildflower blooms, particularly cyclamens, anemones, and narcissuses. Designated areas throughout the forest serve as open campgrounds and picnic sites for visitors.

A significant portion of the forest's infrastructure is dedicated to universal design and comprehensive accessibility, centered around HaLohem Park (Hebrew: פארק הלוחם). Developed by KKL-JNF in cooperation with the IDF Disabled Veterans Organization, the park contains specialized infrastructure fully adapted for wheelchair users and individuals with special needs. This infrastructure includes disabled-accessible walking paths, adaptive bicycle trails, an accessible sports field, an open-air amphitheater, and modified picnic and barbecue facilities.
