= Atatürk Museum =

Atatürk Museum may refer to:

- Atatürk Museum, Şişli, in Istanbul, Turkey
- Atatürk Museum (Adana)
- Atatürk Museum (Thessaloniki)
- Atatürk Museum, Mersin
- Atatürk's House Museum (Antalya)
