= Woonoord Atatürk =

Residential complex in Amsterdam

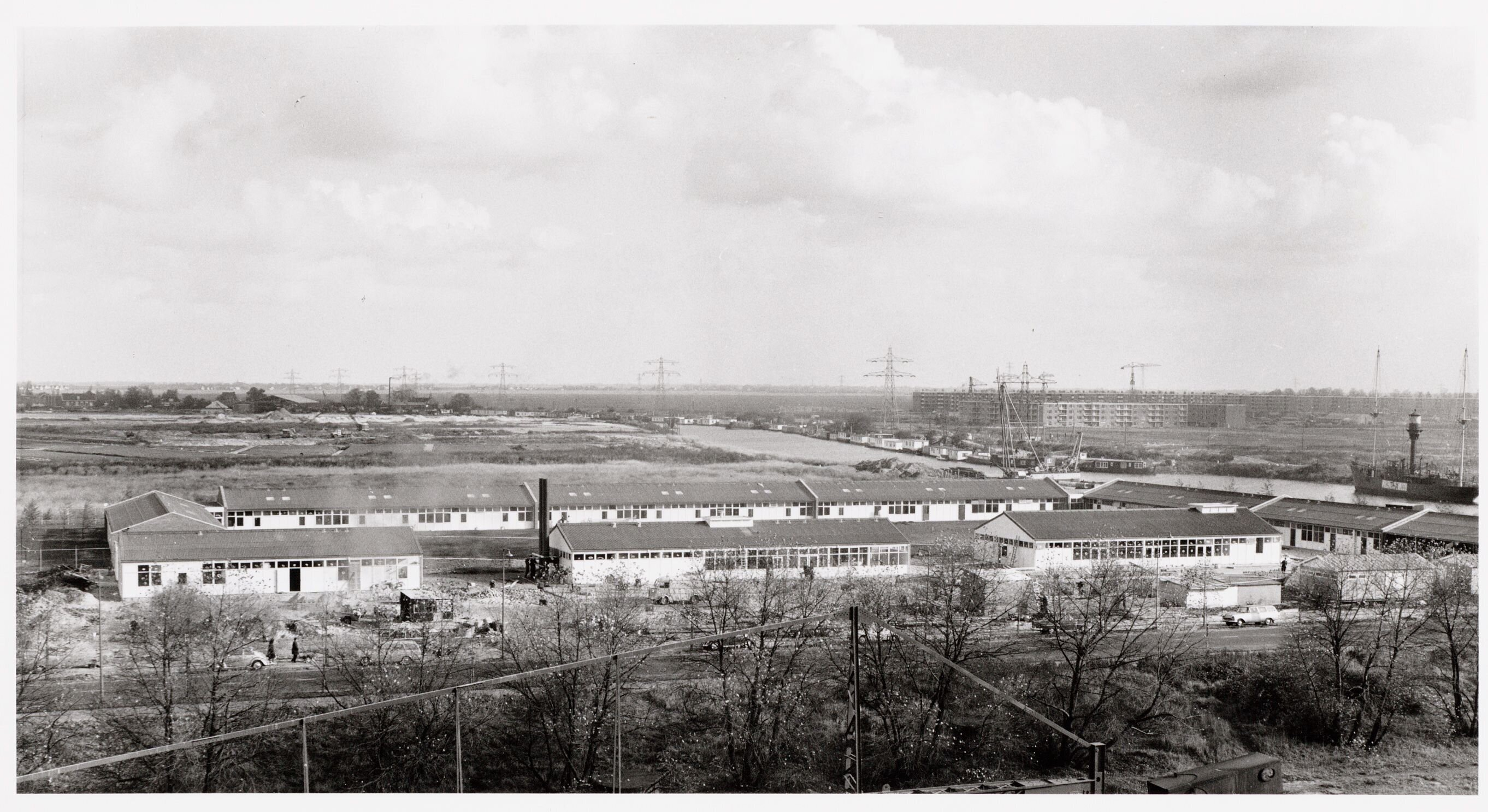
- An overview of the site in 1965

General information
- Coordinates: 52°24′11″N 4°53′53″E
- Population: 260 (1972)
- No. of blocks: 34

Construction
- Constructed: 1965

Listing
- Demolished: 1978

Other information
- Governing body: Municipality of Amsterdam

Woonoord Atatürk (Turkish: Atatürk Yurdu, lit. 'Atatürk Residential Area') was a living space for Turkish guest workers in Amsterdam-Noord named after Mustafa Kemal Atatürk. It was opened in 1965 and initially housed construction workers who were brought in to cope with the growth of the Dutch economy. During its initial years, the complex was not completely full due to the construction sector not growing as expected. In 1967, a new wave of workers arrived from Turkey for the Nederlandsche Dok en Scheepsbouw Maatschappij, which were also moved to Atatürk.

Workers in Atatürk were expected to return to Turkey and were not integrated into Dutch society. In 1972, tension broke out between residents and complex staff after a Turkish chef was dismissed for causing a kitchen fire. Since the remaining chefs only cooked Dutch food, the residents boycotted the hot meals from the cafeteria. The boycott ended a few weeks later after a new Turkish chef was hired. During the final years of the complex, workers started to bring their families to the Netherlands and left Atatürk for a permanent residence elsewhere. The complex was closed in 1978 due to cost issues and the buildings were demolished. A monument commemorating Atatürk has been erected on the site of the former complex.

== Early years ==
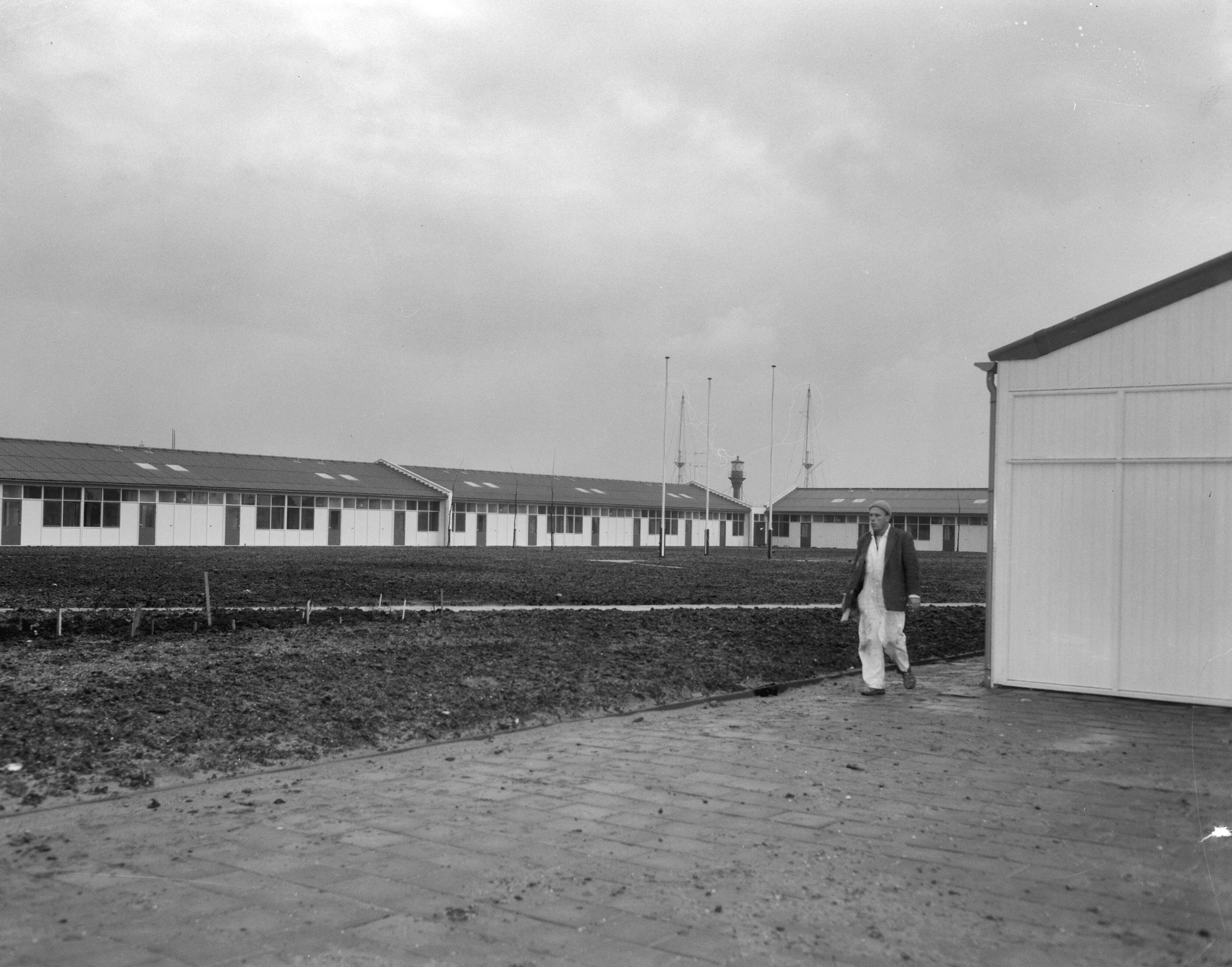
The courtyard of the complex

Following the conclusion of World War II, the Dutch economy recovered quickly, leading to an unforeseen growth in employment. Many industrial companies were unable to find workers capable and willing to perform heavy duty tasks, and started to bring in workers from Italy. As the shortage did not end by the 1960s, coupled with the post-war emigration of Dutch people, the search for workers was expanded to other countries around the Mediterranean. On 9 August 1964, the Dutch and Turkish governments signed an agreement to bring over Turkish workers to the Netherlands to solve staff shortages across the country. The workers would mostly be housed in residential complexes. The Municipality of Amsterdam made land in Amsterdam-Noord available, as well as 2 million Dutch guilders, to be used for the project.

The new complex was constructed on Klaprozenweg, Amsterdam-Noord, in 1965 and named after Mustafa Kemal Atatürk, the first president of Turkey. The term "yurt" was used for the translation into Turkish, though the residents called it a camp. Among Dutch locals, it was known as the Turkendorp (Turkish Village). The site consisted of 34 white wooden barracks, with each having a living room and two sleeping rooms for four people. There was a shared cafeteria, a garage, a library, an infirmary and a small mosque. It was run by the Municipality of Amsterdam. Several other complexes for workers existed across the country; Atatürk was the largest in Amsterdam. The first 27 workers to live there were welcomed in a ceremony. These were employees for two different construction companies based in Amsterdam and Zaandam. Upon arrival, the workers were allowed to choose their roommates on their own. The management hoped that this would increase privacy, but in practice this rarely worked out as it allowed for conflicting shifts and habits among roommates. The governments of both countries expected the migrant workers to return at some point, so there was no effort made to familiarize them with Dutch society and the residents rarely left the complex. Despite the lack of governmental support, some residents in the complex tried to learn the Dutch language and practiced biking. An Amsterdam savings bank visited the area every two weeks to talk with the migrants, which was done with translators.

During the first few years, the number of residents in the complex never exceeded 180. The construction sector fell behind the expected growth and there was a lack of projects and therefore little demand for workers. This led to 50 workers living in the complex being fired in August 1967. The municipality considered filling the empty rooms with students, tourists, elderly people or policemen. In the meantime, multiple shipbuilding companies in the Netherlands were looking for staff abroad. After finding some workers in Italy and Yugoslavia, a delegation of the Nederlandsche Dok en Scheepsbouw Maatschappij went to visit Turkey. Here they toured Ankara, Istanbul and İzmit, and found 136 Turkish men after 20 days. In total, around 200 people were taken to Amsterdam with a charter flight; only at Schiphol Airport were they informed of their definitive destination as they were assigned to Damen Verolme in Rotterdam or Nederlandsche Dok en Scheepsbouw Maatschappij. The Turkish workers assigned to the Nederlandsche Dok en Scheepsbouw Maatschappij were also moved to Atatürk. A football team, named Ataspor, was formed by the residents in 1968 and played in the courtyard of the complex against the teams of other migrant complexes. By 1972, around 260 Turkish immigrants lived inside the complex.

== Food crisis and closure ==
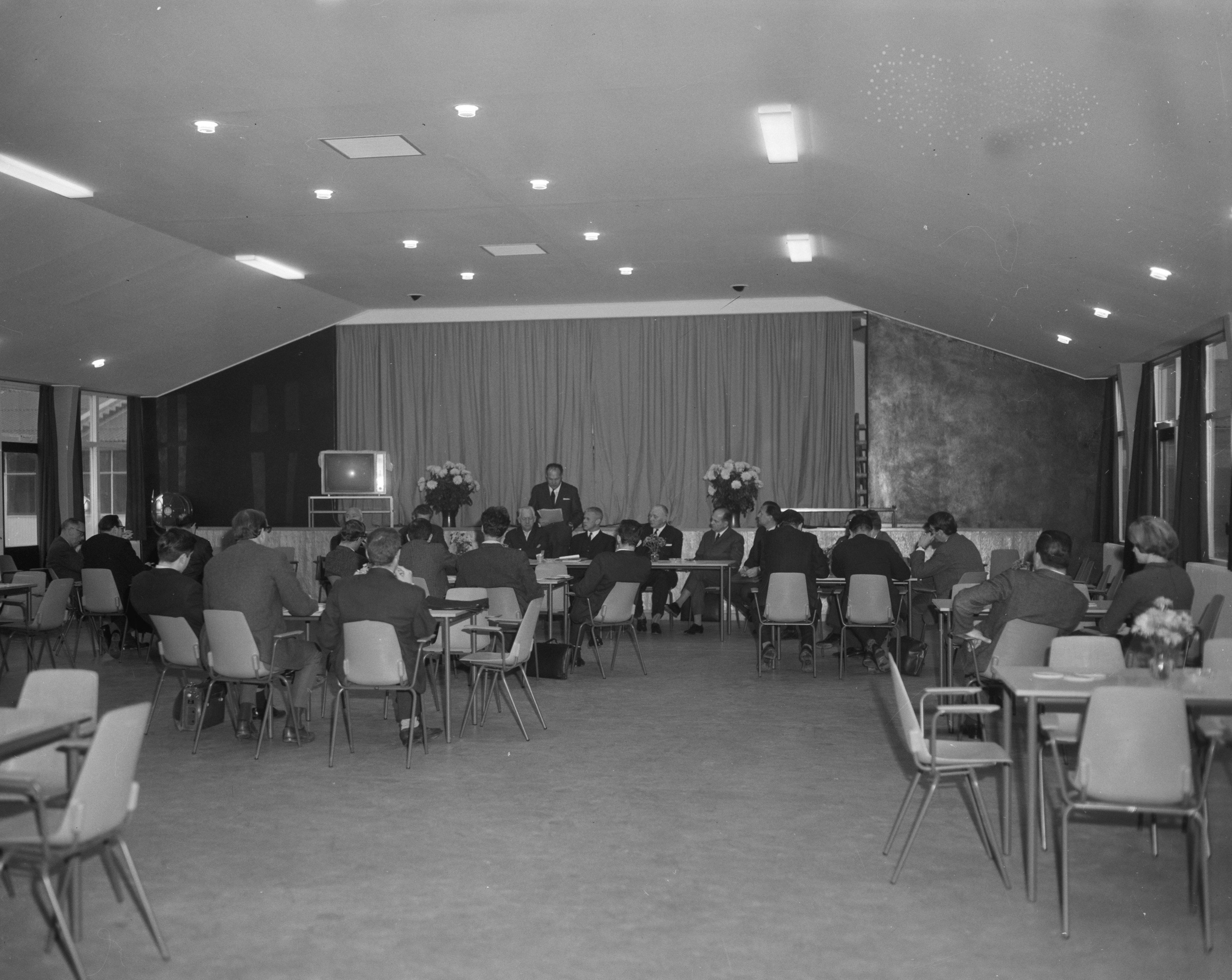
The shared cafeteria of the complex

Following the arrival of the new workers, a committee was formed by the residents to forward their complaints to the management. One of the main issues in the complex was that the Turks were unsatisfied with the food policy. They were not allowed to cook or make any drinks in their own barracks, and on most days the cafeteria served Dutch food and rarely any Turkish food. Most workers could not get used to the Dutch food being served and there were repeatedly communication problems between canteen staff and residents. Similarly, the consultation between the committee and management was also plagued by the language barrier.

On 20 December 1972, a fire broke out in the kitchen after a Turkish cook over-heated the stove despite warnings from other staff. He was dismissed from the kitchen shortly after. However, as he was the sole Turkish chef at the time and was not replaced, the kitchen started only cooking Dutch food, without any Turkish dishes at all. This prompted a boycott from the residents, who stopped showing up for dinner on 23 December and only ate bread. The municipality still ordered food to be cooked in the hope that the workers would change their minds, but the meals ended up being thrown out every day. Some of the workers who were leading the boycott were threatened with eviction from the complex. However, with the Industrial Workers' Union NVV backing residents, the municipality later called this off and announced on 10 January 1973 that at least one Turkish chef would be hired for the kitchen, ending the boycott of the workers after two weeks. They were also allowed to cook on their own in their rooms.

Many workers still left the complex following the incident; some returned to Turkey, most moved elsewhere into a permanent residence and brought over their families, while some even opened their own businesses. Residents complained in 1974 that the complex was overdue on basic maintenance. In 1975, new development plans for the NDSM neighborhood were published, where the Atatürk residence complex and buildings of the Nederlandsche Dok en Scheepsbouw Maatschappij would need to make way for offices and businesses. The population of the site started to sharply decline in 1976. A year later, the municipality announced that the complex was running on deficit and they were considering closing it. In October 1977, the complex was allowed to stay open until at least July 1978, and options were explored to extend that even further. The Atatürk complex was closed in 1978 and its barracks were later demolished. The area was used for subsidized housing instead.

== Monument and legacy ==
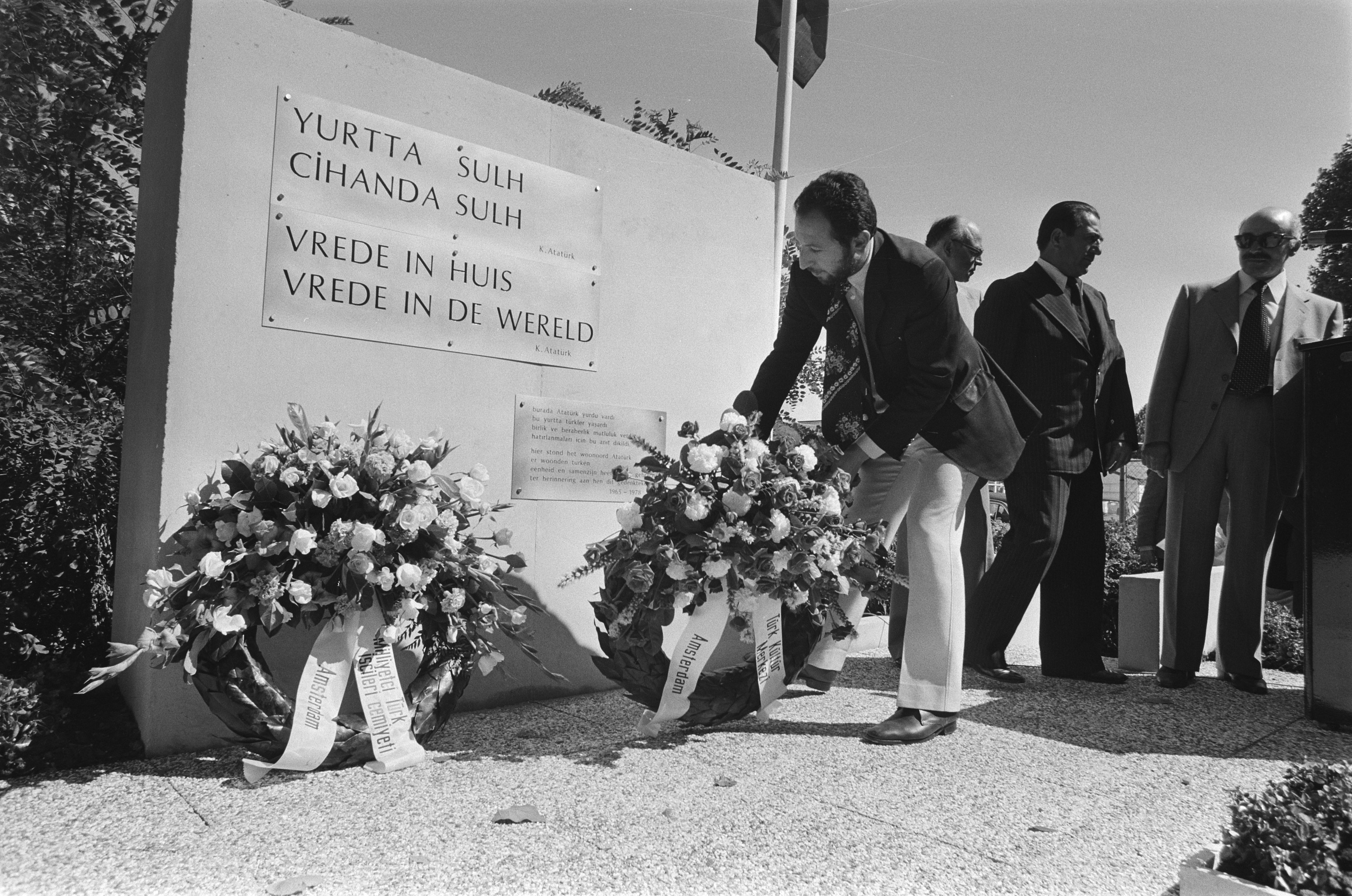
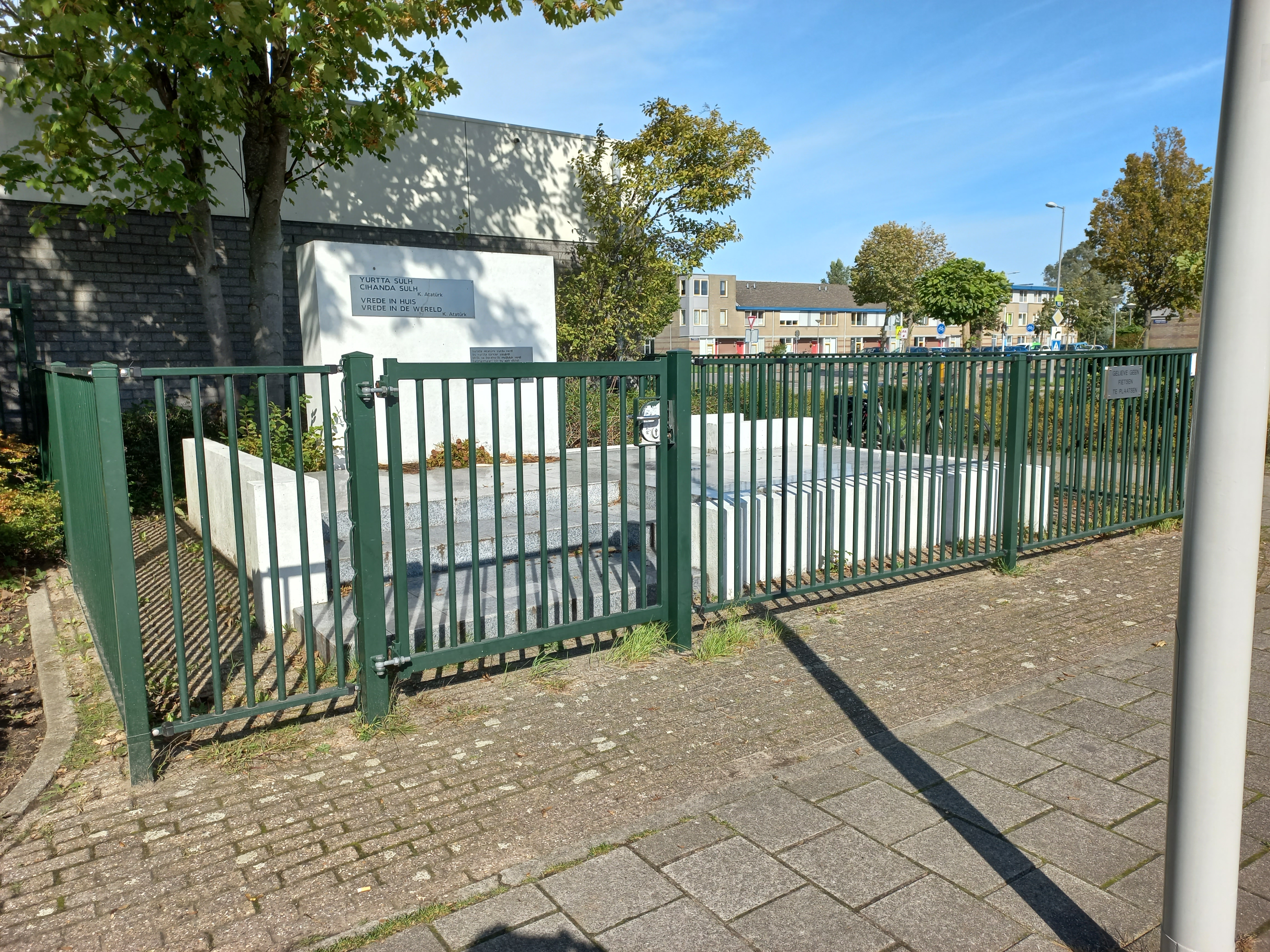
Opening of the monument in 1978 (left) and its appearance in 2023 (right)

The complex holds an important place in the history of the Turkish community in Amsterdam, as it housed the first Turkish immigrants in the city and is considered to be the foundation of the community. Atatürk had already developed into a cultural center for the community during its existence, with many Turks living outside visiting the complex and participating in activities.

A monument commemorating Atatürk by M. Turkmen was erected on a street next to the complex in 1978. The monument is relatively plain and consists of a copper plate with an inscription, together with the decorative concrete elevation in front. The inscription includes the "Peace at home, peace in the world" quote of Atatürk in both Dutch and Turkish, as well as the text "Here was the Ataturk residential complex, Turks lived there. Unity and solidarity brought happiness, and this monument was erected to remember them."

During the redevelopment process of the neighborhood in 1985, the street which the monument was located on was named Atatürk, referring to the village; the street is short and has no houses on it. A bus stop sharing the name of the street is served by lines 36 and 39 of the GVB. The monument was restored and repaired in November 2010. A few months later, the copper inscription on the monument went missing. The municipality initially thought that it was stolen, but it was later revealed that a special unit for monuments of the municipality temporarily removed it without notice for cleaning.

== See also ==
- Netherlands–Turkey relations
