= Frank Tachau =

American scholar

- Born: Frank Tachau; 19 October 1929; Braunschweig, Weimar Republic
- Died: 23 July 2010 (aged 80); Sykesville, Maryland, United States
- Occupation: Professor

Academic background
- Education: University of Illinois

Academic work
- Discipline: Political Science
- Notable students: Joel S. Migdal

Frank Tachau (19 October 1929 – 23 July 2010) was an American scholar of German descent.

== Early life and education ==
Frank Tachau was born in Braunschweig into a Jewish family. His father was Paul Tachau and his mother Ilse Tachau. Some members of the family were rabbis involved in German politics. The family moved to the United States in 1936, eventually settling on Chicago's South Side. Tachau graduated from the Hyde Park Academy High School. He graduated with a BSc and eventually obtained an MSc in political sciences from the University of Chicago. His master's thesis focused on the "diplomacy of the Turkish Straits between 1936 and 1946". He received his Ph.D in international relations from the same university in 1958 for a dissertation on Turkish nationalism.

== Academic career ==
His early academic career led him to Purdue and Rutgers universities. From September 1963 to June 1964 he was awarded a Fulbright Fellowship at the University of Ankara. He was called to the University of Illinois Chicago in 1968. There he stayed for the remainder of his career, where on two occasions he acted as chairman of the political science department. He retired from his full-time professorship in 1996 but continued to lecture until 2010.

=== Research ===
He is noted for contributing to a shift in Middle Eastern studies toward a broader comparative focus. He conducted extensive research on the politics in Turkey and the Ottoman Empire; was appointed a visiting professor to several Turkish universities; and mastered both modern Turkish and Ottoman Turkish. The interviews he conducted with members of the Israeli Parliament (Knesset) have been cited in the work of other researchers. His work contributed to the University of Illinois Chicago's engagement with international scholarship, particularly in Middle Eastern studies.

== Personal life ==
Frank Tachau was married and the father of five children. He died on 23 July 2010.
