= Eshtaol Forest =

Forest in Israel

Coordinates: 31°48′N 34°59′E

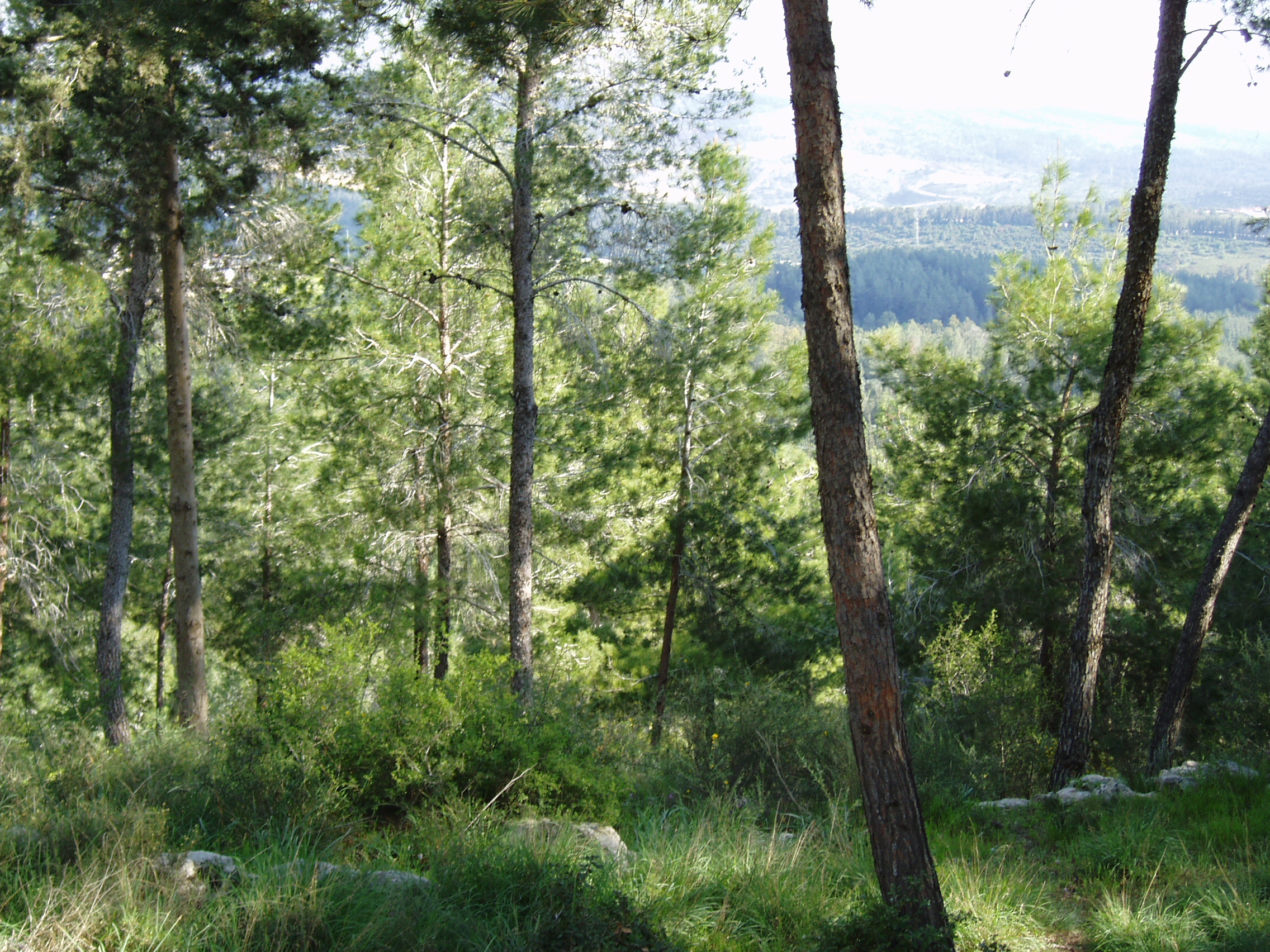
Eshtaol Forest

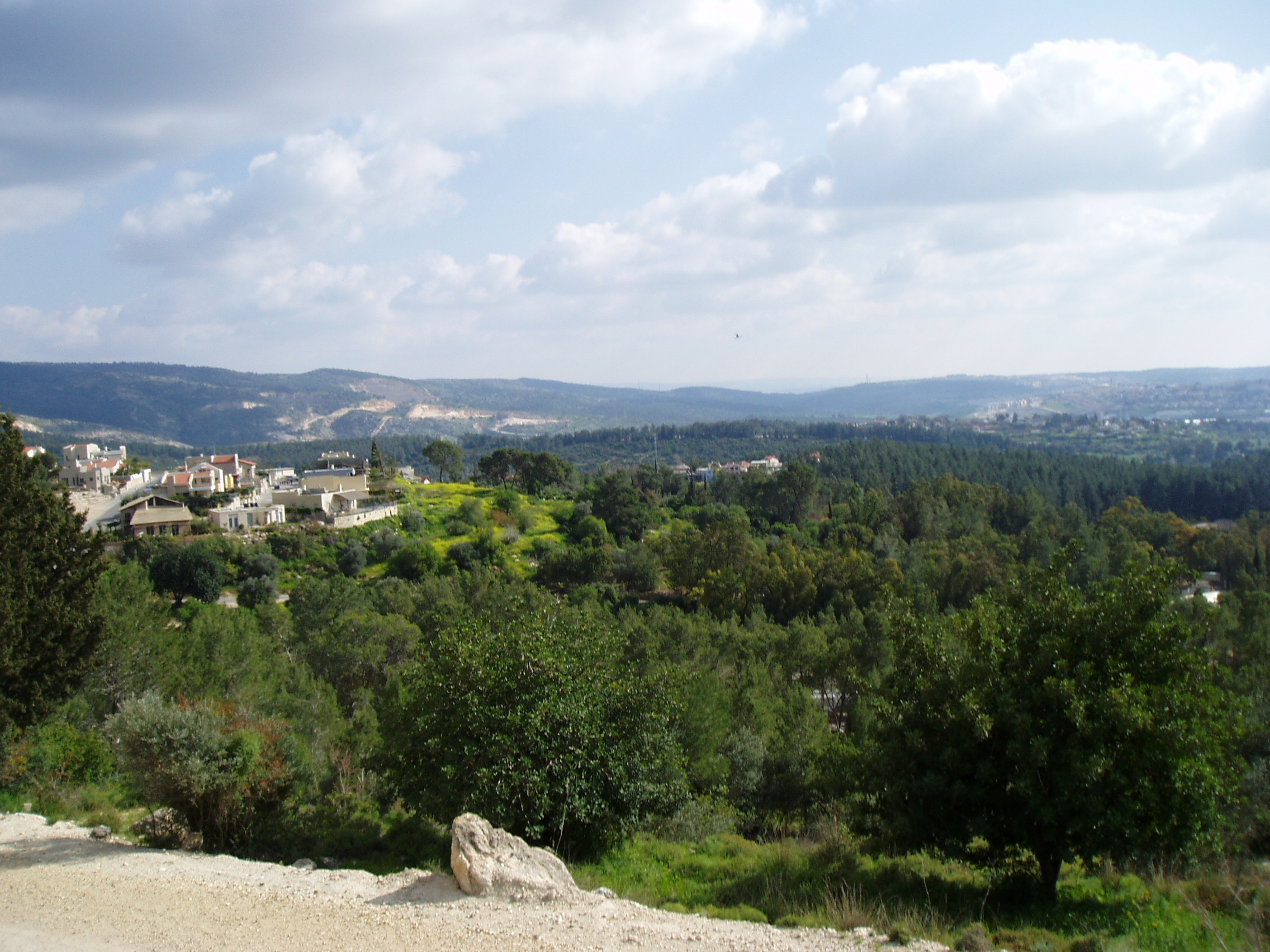
Eshtaol Forest

Eshtaol Forest (Hebrew: יער אשתאול) is a forest in Israel, located north of Beit Shemesh and near Ta'oz and Neve Shalom, south of the Tel Aviv-Jerusalem Highway. The Forest of the Martyrs lies to the east. The forest is a popular recreation area and is one of the largest forests in Israel.

== History ==
Eshtaol Forest features an 8-kilometer hiking trail and numerous scenic views. The forest (like most other forests in Israel) was planted in by the Jewish National Fund, which continues to expand it.

The forest covers an area of approximately 1,200 hectares (3,000 acres). A 2015 forest fire decimated 202 hectares (500 acres) of the forest. In addition to numerous recreational and picnic areas, the forest has internal roads that allow for scenic drives through the forest. The Eshtaol hiking trail also contains part of the much larger Israel National Trail.

The forest has a recreation area named for Bernardo O'Higgins, the first leader of independent Chile. His image is engraved on the face of a giant coin embedded in a rock at the site.

== See also ==
- List of forests in Israel
- Jerusalem Forest
- Yatir Forest
