= Atatürk Forest (Israel) =

Forest planted by immigrants from Turkey in Israel

Coordinates: 32°39′8″N 34°57′39″E

Atatürk Forest Turkish: Atatürk Ormanı Hebrew: יער אתאטורק
- Interactive map of Atatürk Forest

Geography
- Location: Haifa, Israel

Administration
- Status: Alive
- Established: 1953

Atatürk Forest is a forest named for Mustafa Kemal Atatürk, founder of the Turkish Republic, in the southern area of Mount Carmel in Israel.

== History ==
The forest was established in 1953 by Turkish Jews who had immigrated to Israel. Trees were planted on what was a barren mountain. The opening ceremony was attended by Israeli president Yitzhak Ben-Zvi and Turkish Ambassador Şefket İstinyeli who both also planted a tree. A plaque at the site reads:

"ATATÜRK ORMANI TÜRKİYE'DEN GELEN MUSEVİLER TARAFINDAN DİKİLMİŞTİR"

Photos taken at the event show Turkish women standing in front of a plaque. Up until the 1970s, Turks who visited the forest and planted a tree there would receive a certificate.

There was a large fire on Mount Carmel in 2010 but Atatürk Forest, on the south side of the summit, was unharmed.

The forest has a recreation area and bicycle paths, as well as memorials to the martyred.
