= Transmission =

Transmission or transmit may refer to:

== Science and technology ==
- Power transmission
  - Electric power transmission
  - Transmission (mechanical device), technology that allows controlled application of power
    - Automatic transmission
    - Manual transmission
- Signal transmission, the process of sending and propagating an analogue or digital information signal
  - Analogue transmission, the process of sending and propagating an analogue signal
  - Data transmission, the process of sending and propagating digital information
  - Signaling (telecommunications), transmission of meta-information related to the actual transmission
- Monetary transmission mechanism, process by which asset prices and general economic conditions are affected as a result of monetary policy decisions
- Pathogen transmission, the passing of a disease from an infected host individual or group to a particular individual or group
- Cellular signaling, transmission of signals within or between living cells
- Heredity, the transfer of genetic information from genes to another generation
- Transmission (BitTorrent client), a free, open-source and cross-platform BitTorrent client application
- Transmit (file transfer tool), an FTP client for Mac OS X

== Arts and entertainment ==
=== Music ===
- TRNSMT, music festival in Glasgow, Scotland
- Transmission (band), an English experimental/post-rock band
- Transmission (festival), an annual trance music event
- Transmission Communications, an Australian record label
- Trans Mission, planned music festival in London, 2026

==== Albums ====
- Transmission (Gay Dad album) or the title song, 2001
- Transmission (The Tea Party album) or the title song, 1997
- Transmission (Violent Delight album) or the title song, 2003
- Transmissions (Alan Silva and Oluyemi Thomas album), 1993
- Transmissions (Juno Reactor album), 1993
- Transmissions (Starset album), 2014
- Transmissions (Amos Lee album), 2024
- Transmission (Low EP), 1996
- Transmission (Mêlée EP), 2001

==== Songs ====
- "Transmission" (song), by Joy Division, 1979
- "Transmission", a mashup by Neil Cicierega from Mouth Silence, 2014
- "Transmissions", a song by the American band Bright from The Albatross Guest House, 1997
- "Transmissions', a song by the Irish band God Is an Astronaut from Origins, 2013

=== Other media ===
- Transmission (magazine), a UK literary magazine
- Transmission (novel), a 2005 novel by Hari Kunzru
- Transmission (TV programme), a British music programme
- Transmission, a webcomic by Mark A. Smith, former cartoonist for The Space Gypsy Adventures

== Religion and esotericism ==
- Transmission (esotericism), in Hinduism
- Dharma transmission, in Buddhism, the sequence of lineage holders of a tradition
- Esoteric transmission, in Buddhism, the transmission of empowerment and authorization for a specific practice

== See also ==
- Transmitter, a device for propagating electronic signals
- Transmissibility (disambiguation)
- Transmittance, the propagation of electromagnetic waves through a medium
- Transmissivity (disambiguation)
