= Nuri Demirağ Nu D.40 =

Turkish aircraft

Nu D.40

General information
- Type: Twin-boom aircraft
- National origin: Turkey
- Manufacturer: Nuri Demirağ Aircraft Works

The Nuri Demirağ Nu D.40 was a 1940s Turkish twin-boom, twin-engine pusher aircraft designed by the Nuri Demirağ Aircraft Works in Istanbul for the Turkish military.

== History ==
The project of producing the first Turkish fighter aircraft for the Turkish military, named Nu D.40, which would be capable of competing with equivalent classes of European and American aircraft, began at the Nuri Demirağ workshop in Beşiktaş, Istanbul. The company had produced a trainer aircraft Nu D.36 and a light transporter Nu D.38 before.

In 2019, the Turkish researcher Dr. Emir Öngüner, who worked in the archive of the German Aerospace Center (German: Deutsches Zentrum für Luft- und Raumfahrt, DLR), published that according to 292 pages of documents and 48 technical drawings dated berween 1937 and 1942, the Aerodynamics Research Institute (German: Aerodynamische Versuchsanstalt, AVA) in Göttingen carried out aerodynamic experiments on reduced-scale model aircraft of Nu D.38 and Nu D.40 in its wind tunnel, because Turkey had no such testing facility at that time.

The communication process began in May 1937, continued uninterrupted until the fall of 1939, when World War II broke out. The AVA conducted tests deemed approriate by Demirağ's technical team on the prototype of the Nu D.40, manufactured at AVA using technical drawings sent from Turkey, and the resulting data was transmitted to Turkey in the form of reports. Unfortunately, the outbreak of the war affected the project's outcome. The process was halted because the full fee requested by AVA could not be paid and no news was received from Turkey for an extended period.

The Company of Nuri Demirağ appealed to the Ministry of Aviation, Nazi Germany (German: Reichsluftfahrtministerium, RLM). With the intervention of the RLM in 1940, events took a turn for the worse for both Demirağ and Turkey. Following the Ministry's review, and due to the inability to collect the fee, it was deemed appropriate to transfer the technical reports regarding the Turkish fighter aircraft project Nu D.40 to the state archives and to the Junkers and Focke-Achgelis companies that manufactured aircraft for the Nazi Germany Air Force (German: Luftwaffe) during World War II.

== Design ==
The Nu D.40 was designed as a twin-boom aircraft, of which resemblance with the Focke-Wulf Fw 189 Uhu is striking. The Nu D.40 features a twin-propeller propulsion system, with one tractor and one pusher, mounted on the central fuselage while the Fw 189 has a twin-engine mounted on the wings, and has a different external cockpit geometry.

== Bibliography ==
- Öngüner, Emir. Bir Avcı Tayyaresi Yapmaya Karar Verdim [I decided to produce a fighter aircraft] (4th ed.). TÜBİTAK. p. 214. ISBN 978-605-312-388-0.
