= Mountains of Sorrow, Rivers of Song =

Studio album by Amos Lee
- Released: October 8, 2013
- Genres: Folk, neo soul
- Length: 43:01
- Label: Blue Note
- Producer: Jay Joyce

Amos Lee chronology
As the Crow Flies (2012)	Mountains of Sorrow, Rivers of Song (2013)	Spirit (2016)

Mountains of Sorrow, Rivers of Song is an album by American musician Amos Lee, released on October 8, 2013. This album follows Lee's record, Mission Bell, which went to Number 1 on the Billboard 200. The album is the first to feature his touring band with guest appearances by Alison Krauss, Patty Griffin and Jeff Coffin of the Dave Matthews Band. The album features the single "The Man Who Wants You."

The album debuted on the Billboard 200 at No. 16, and No. 7 on Top Rock Albums, selling 18,000 copies in its debut week. The album has sold 75,000 copies in the US as of July 2016.

== Track listing ==
All songs written by Amos Lee.

1. "Johnson Blvd" – 4:15
2. "Stranger" – 3:49
3. "Tricksters, Hucksters, and Scamps" – 3:20
4. "Chill in the Air" – 4:27
5. "Dresser Drawer" – 4:23
6. "Indonesia" – 3:27
7. "High Water" – 2:38
8. "The Man Who Wants You" – 3:00
9. "Loretta" – 3:45
10. "Plain View" – 2:33
11. "Mountains of Sorrow" – 4:02
12. "Burden" – 3:22

Deluxe Edition bonus tracks

13. "Scared Money" – 6:49
14. "Charles St." – 2:58
15. "Lowdown Life" – 4:12

== Personnel ==
The Band

- Amos Lee – lead vocals (all tracks), acoustic guitar (1, 2, 4, 5, 6, 9, 11, 14), electric guitar (2, 6, 7, 8, 13, 15), ukulele (3, 10, 12), banjo (3, 10), 12 string acoustic guitar (5), C3 organ (9), mandocello (12)
- Freddie Berman – drums (1, 2, 4, 5, 6, 7, 8, 11, 12, 13, 14, 15), claps (1), percussion (3, 9, 10)
- Zach Djanikian – electric bass (1, 2, 4, 6, 7, 8, 9, 11, 13, 14, 15), harmony vocals (2, 4, 11), electric guitar (3), marimbula (3, 5), toy piano (3), saxophone (8), recorder (10), woodblock (10), acoustic guitar (12)
- Andy Keenan – pedal steel guitar (1, 4, 13, 14, 15), banjo (2, 4, 7, 11), harmony vocals (2, 4, 11), Supro dobro (3), acoustic guitar (4, 12), dobro (5), 12 string acoustic guitar (5, 12), baritone electric (6), electric guitar (8, 9, 11), mandocello (10), baritone guitar (14)
- Jaron Olevsky – Steinway (1), pump organ (1), C3 organ (1, 2, 7, 11, 15), toy piano (1), harmony vocals (2), double bass (3, 12), accordion (3, 4, 12), piano (3, 4, 5, 6, 8, 9, 11, 12, 13, 14), synth mandolin (3), B3 organ (4), vibes (4), Omnichord (5), marimbula (10)

Additional Musicians

- Mutlu Onaral – harmony vocals on "Stranger" and "The Man Who Wants You"
- Jeff Coffin – baritone saxophone on "High Water" and "Lowdown Life", tenor saxophone on "Lowdown Life"
- Joanna Cotten – background vocals on "Stranger"
- Jerry Douglas – dobro on "Chill in the Air" and "Mountains of Sorrow"
- Patty Griffin – harmony vocals on "Mountains of Sorrow"
- Perry Greenfield – saxophone on "The Man Who Wants You"
- Jedd Hughes – mandolin on "Chill in the Air"
- Jay Joyce – production, electric guitar on "Johnson Blvd.", "Chill in the Air" and "Loretta", 12-string electric guitar on "Mountains of Sorrow" and "Burden"
- Alison Krauss – harmony vocals on "Chill in the Air"
- Mickey Raphael – harmonica on "Johnson Blvd.", bass harmonica on "Tricksters, Hucksters, and Scamps"
- Giles Reaves – drums on "Stranger", "Tricksters, Hucksters, and Scamps", "Chill in the Air", "The Man Who Wants You" and "Loretta", percussion on "Johnson Blvd.", "Tricksters, Hucksters, Scamps", "Chill in the Air", "Dresser Drawer", "The Man Who Wants You", "Loretta", "Plain View", "Mountains of Sorrow" and "Charles St.", synth flute on "Loretta", Wurlitzer on "Mountains of Sorrow" and "Lowdown Life", clavinet on "The Man Who Wants You", shaker on "Burden"
- Tony Joe White – electric guitar on "Scared Money" and "Lowdown Life", harmonica and additional vocals on "Lowdown Life"

== Chart performance ==
Chart (2011)	Peak position
US Billboard 200	16
US Americana/Folk Albums (Billboard)	1
US Top Rock Albums (Billboard)	7
US Indie Store Album Sales (Billboard)	18
