= Onaral =

Onaral is a surname. Notable people with the surname include:

- Banu Onaral (1949–2024), Turkish biomedical engineer
- Mutlu Onaral (born 1979), American singer
