= Transmissibility =

Transmissibility may refer to:

- Transmissibility (vibration)
- Transmissibility (electromagnetism)
- Transmissibility (structural dynamics)

== See also ==
- Basic reproduction number, in medicine
- Permeability (disambiguation)
- Transmission (disambiguation)
- Transmissivity (disambiguation)
- Transmitter, a device for propagating electronic signals
- Transmittance, in optics, the propagation of a light wave through a medium
