= Caroline Moir =

British author

Caroline Moir is a British author based in Kendal UK, close to the Lake District National Park.

She is known for writing plays, fiction (genres include the dystopic and modern gothic) and creative non-fiction. A focus of her work is also as an educationalist and promoter of literary arts. She studied English & philosophy at the University of Birmingham, masters at Lancaster University and a PhD from the University of Glasgow.

Moir has written two novels Jemillia (2007) and The Brockenspectre (2011), with work on the third commencing from 2013/14. Commissions include BBC Radio, Ripon Cathedral and Kendal Community Theatre.

Moir collaborates regularly with fellow writers and artists, amongst them Guy Wilson (The Armed Man). Through these collaborations, she is active in a number of progressive literary circles, co-establishing The Leeds Peace Poetry Festival in 2003 and Warehouse Writers Workshop at The Brewery Arts Centre Kendal in 2006. In 2015/16 as a founder and member of Kendal Community Theatre, she co-created Kendal Yarns Festival - a week long festival of plays featuring over 50 new plays by people from the region, with involvement from a number of nationally acclaimed theatre directors.

== Publications ==
- Timeo Danaos (From Glasgow to Saturn, 2011);
- A goat, a duppy & a walnut tree (Unbound Press/Spilling Ink Review, 2011);
- Homage à Rabelais en Roussillon (Brand Magazine, 2010)
- St Wilfred of Ripon or A Tale of Two Tonsures (commissioned & performed, 2009)
- Nusf Sahaa (BRAND, 2009)
- Asda (swampwriting, 2008)
- The Kendal Shepherds' Play (commissioned & performed, 2007); *Flight (Muse, 2006)
- Mary's Story (commissioned & performed, 2005);
- The Man Who Told a Lie (Transmission, 2005)
- A Passion for Kendal
- Lady Anne Clifford: A Woman Cast Out
