= Dreamland (Amos Lee album) =

- The standard edition of the album, with a cream-colored border; the deluxe edition has navy blue

Studio album by Amos Lee
- Released: February 11, 2022
- Length: 39:46
- Language: English
- Label: Dualtone
- Producer: Christian "Leggy" Langdon

Amos Lee chronology
My New Moon (2018)	Dreamland (2022)	My Ideal: A Tribute to Chet Baker Sings (2022)

I started working on the songs for Dreamland in 2019, and we recorded the bulk of it in 2020. Much of it was done before the pandemic, but a lot of the themes that are in the record, like isolation and hope, are as relevant now and they were when I wrote the record. During the pandemic, I wrote probably two whole new records which I'm going to start recording now. So the journey has been pretty winding the past couple years, as it has been for all of us. I don't really know anyone who's had an easy time adapting to it the last two years. I think it's changed everyone, and it's certainly changed me.

—Amos Lee on writing and recording Dreamland during the COVID-19 pandemic.

Dreamland is a 2022 studio album by American musician Amos Lee.

== Reception ==
Editors at AllMusic rated this album 3.5 out of 5 stars, with critic Matt Collar writing that this music offers "a soulful musical balm for a troubled world" that "is relaxed in tone, pitched at the speed of early afternoon sun streaming through an open window". In American Songwriter, Lee Zimmerman gave this album 4 out of 5 stars, calling it a "decidedly telling narrative, one that details a journey to discovery" that "echoes the notion that an empathic attitude can allow us all to sleep a little more soundly". Writing for No Depression, Matt Conner summed up his review that "Lee bares [his emotional scars] for all to hear, and the album is somehow made all the more beautiful for it".

== Track listing ==
All songs written by Amos Lee, except where noted.

1. "Dreamland" (Jenn Decilveo and Amos Lee) – 5:06
2. "Worry No More" – 3:41
3. "How You Run" – 3:01
4. "Into the Clearing" – 3:10
5. "Hold You" – 4:43
6. "See the Light" – 2:50
7. "It's Real" – 3:03
8. "Seeing Ghosts" (Christian Langdon and Lee) – 3:25
9. "Shoulda Known Better" – 3:05
10. "Clean" – 3:48
11. "Invisible Oceans" (Bianca Ghermezian, Ethan Gruska, and Lee) – 4:00

Deluxe edition bonus tracks

12. Beeline" – 3:10
13. "Game Show" – 2:43
14. "I Won't Let Go" – 3:18
15. "Shine" – 3:01
16. "Worry No More" (Acoustic) – 3:18
17. "See the Light" (Acoustic) – 2:46

== Personnel ==
- Amos Lee – acoustic guitar, electric guitar, backing vocals, vocals
- Denise Guerin – cover photography
- Christian "Leggy" Langdon – bowed vibraphone, breathing, drums, dulcimer, acoustic guitar, bass guitar, electric guitar, Hammond B3, mellotron, piano, percussion, pump organ, synthesizer, synthesizer bass, toy piano, Wurlitzer, string arrangement, drum programming, orchestra conducting, engineering, mixing, production
- Joey Luscinski – art direction
- Stephen Marcussen – mastering
- Pete Min – engineering
- Rob Moose – string arrangement
- Jen Mussari – illustrations
- Ori Ravid – assistant engineering
- Mike Robinson – drums
- Joel Shearer – guitar
- Aaron Sterling – drums
- Carl Stoodt – assistant engineering

== Chart performance ==
Dreamland peaked at 39 on Billboard's Top Rock Albums.

== See also ==
- 2022 in American music
- Lists of 2022 albums
