= My New Moon =

Studio album by Amos Lee
- Released: August 31, 2018
- Studio: Zeitgeist Studio, Los Angeles, California, United States
- Genre: Americana
- Length: 38:09
- Language: English
- Label: Dualtone
- Producer: Tony Berg

Amos Lee chronology
Spirit (2016)	My New Moon (2018)	Dreamland (2022)

My New Moon is a studio album by American musician Amos Lee, released via Dualtone Records on August 31, 2018. It received mixed reviews from critics but praise for the depth of Lee's emotional resonance. Many of the themes come from Lee's introspection as an artist and emotional struggles in the face of violence and his place in the world.

== Critical reception ==
Album of the Year summed up critical consensus as a 68 out of 100, based on four reviews. A positive review came from the editorial staff of AllMusic Guide who awarded it four out of five stars and highlighted it as the "Best of 2018", with reviewer Matt Collar accenting the range of emotions in Lee's writing, calling this "ruminative if still uplifting album, characterized by emotive melodies and an earthy soulfulness". Amanda Wicks of Pitchfork gave the album a seven out of 10, also praising the depth of feeling in the lyrics as well as Lee's ability to transition into Americana to keep from stagnating as an artist. For PopMatters, Chris Ingalls finds a few moments that work on the album but assesses that "it doesn't take long for things to fall apart" and while he notes that Lee is a talented singer and songwriter, he uses cliches on this recording and it fees like a "lazy stopgap"; he scores it a six out of 10.

== Sales ==
My New Moon peaked at 49 on the Billboard 200 and at fourth place on Top Rock Albums.

== Track listing ==
All songs are written by Amos Lee.

1. "No More Darkness, No More Light" – 2:56
2. "Louisville" – 3:34
3. "Little Light" – 3:32
4. "All You Got Is a Song" – 3:52
5. "I Get Weak" – 5:47
6. "Crooked" – 2:42
7. "Hang On, Hang On" – 4:10
8. "Don't Give a Damn Anymore" – 2:59
9. "Whiskey On Ice" – 3:31
10. "Don't Fade Away" – 5:01

Deluxe edition bonus tracks

11. "Little Bear" – 2:45
12. "Summer All Over" – 3:16
13. "Dying White Light" – 3:11
14. "What's Going On" (written by Al Cleveland/Marvin Gaye/Renaldo Benson) – 4:42
15. "No More Darkness, No More Light" (acoustic) – 3:37
16. "Don’t Give a Damn Anymore" (Blake Mills mix) – 2:54
17. "Song for Tops" – 3:50

== Personnel ==
- Amos Lee – vocals, guitar, percussion, bass guitar, sitar, glockenspiel
- Ethan Gruska – keyboards, piano, drum programming, synthesizer, kaleidoloop, electric guitar
- Greg Leisz – pedal steel guitar
- Blake Mills – drum programming
- Dylan Day – bass guitar
- Nick Mancini – vibes
- Jaron Olevsky –keyboards, piano, Hammond organ, percussion
- Solomon Dorsey – bass guitar, backing vocals
- Tony Berg – electric guitar, keyboards, autoharp, stylophone
- Rob Moose – strings
- Benmont Tench, Patrick Warren – keyboards
- Matt Chamberlain, Chris Dave – drums, percussion

Technical personnel

- Tony Berg – production
- Tchad Blake – mixing
- David Boucher – recording
- Joseph Lorge – recording
- Bob Ludwig – mastering

== See also ==
- List of 2018 albums
