= National Development Party (Turkey) =

National Development Party Millî Kalkınma Partisi
- Abbreviation: MKP
- Founder: Nuri Demirağ
- Founded: 18 July 1945
- Dissolved: 22 May 1958
- Ideology: Conservatism; Economic liberalism Liberal democracy
- Political position: Centre-right

The National Development Party (Turkish: Millî Kalkınma Partisi, IPA: [milˈliː kaɫkɯnˈma paɾtiˈsi]) was the first opposition party in the multi-party system in Turkey, established by Nuri Demirağ in 1945.

== History ==
In conjunction with the liberalization process that commenced during the final years of World War II, the path for the formation of new political parties was cleared. Within this framework, following the requisite application on 7 July 1945, the National Development Party officially initiated its political activities upon the approval of the Prime Minister Şükrü Saracoğlu on 5 September 1945. The founders of the party included figures such as Hüseyin Avni Ulaş, the leader of the Second Group, the opposition faction in the First Term of the Grand National Assembly of Turkey (1920–23), and Cevat Rıfat Atilhan. Nuri Demirağ served as the party's first chairman. Reflecting a generally liberal orientation, the party program criticized etatist practices and proposed reforms such as the conduct of elections based on a single-stage and proportional representation system, the establishment of a bicameral legislature, and the election of the president for a single term by direct popular vote. Furthermore, the program advocated for the direct election of mayors by the citizenry.

The party accused the Republican People's Party of maintaining a pro-Russian stance and advocated for Islamic Unity and an Eastern Federation in its foreign policy doctrine.

During the parliamentary by-elections held on 6 April 1947 in Istanbul, Kastamonu, Tekirdağ, and Balıkesir, the National Development Party (MKP) experienced significant internal division. The party's central headquarters decided to boycott the elections. In defiance of this decision, the Istanbul district branches declared that the party lacked legitimate central organs at the time and subsequently fielded their own candidates.

The MKP later participated in the 1950 Turkish general election, nominating 20 candidates in Istanbul and 5 in Tekirdağ. Party leader Nuri Demirağ conducted electoral campaigns in Ankara, Konya, and Malatya. During this period, the MKP engaged in negotiations with the Democrat Party (DP) to form an electoral alliance. However, the cooperation failed to materialize, and the MKP was unable to secure any parliamentary seats in the election. In the subsequent 1954 Turkish general election, the party's nationwide support diminished to 9,257 votes. Consequently, the party's founder, Nuri Demirağ, ran on the Democrat Party ticket and was elected as a Member of Parliament for Istanbul.

Although the MKP participated in the 1946 municipal elections as well as the 1946 and 1950 general elections, it failed to achieve significant political presence.

Following Demirağ's death in 1957, the MKP remained devoid of any notable political activity and was considered dissolved on 22 May 1958, as it failed to convene its final general assembly.
