= Supply and Demand (Amos Lee album) =

Studio album by Amos Lee
- Released: October 3, 2006
- Recorded: The Studio, Philadelphia, Pennsylvania; Red Star Recording, Silverlake, California
- Genre: Folk rock, neo soul
- Length: 37:11
- Label: Blue Note
- Producer: Barrie Maguire

Amos Lee chronology
Amos Lee (2005)	Supply and Demand (2006)	Last Days at the Lodge (2008)

Professional ratings
Review scores
Source	Rating
AllMusic	4/5 stars
Slant Magazine	4/5 stars
PopMatters	7/10
Melodic	3.5/5 stars

Supply and Demand is the second album by singer-songwriter Amos Lee, which was released on October 3, 2006. The first single from the album was "Shout Out Loud". Two songs are available for listening on Amos' official website. The album was produced by former Wallflowers and Natalie Merchant bassist Barrie Maguire.

== Track listing ==
All songs written by Amos Lee

1. "Shout Out Loud" – 3:52
2. "Sympathize" – 3:08
3. "Freedom" – 3:08
4. "Careless" – 4:45
5. "Skipping Stone" – 2:19
6. "Supply and Demand" – 3:21
7. "Sweet Pea" – 2:10
8. "Night Train" – 3:32
9. "Southern Girl" – 3:24
10. "The Wind" – 4:31
11. "Long Line of Pain" – 3:01

Two bonus tracks: Truth & Lullaby are available on iTunes.

== Personnel ==
- Amos Lee – Guitar, vocals, tenor guitar, vocorgan, drums, baritone guitar
- Nate Skiles – Guitar, mandolin, background vocals
- Jaron Olevsky – Bass guitar, piano, background vocals
- Fred Berman – Drums, background vocals
- Chris Joyner – Hammond B3, piano, Wurlitzer
- Pete Thomas – Drums
- David Kalish – Dobro
- Greg Leisz – Steel guitar
- John Austin Hughes – Ukulele
- Lizz Wright – Background vocals
- Priscilla Ahn – Background vocals
- Barrie Maguire – Bass guitar, producer, engineering
- Danny Markowitz – A&R
- Shane Smith – Engineer
- Jim Bottari – Engineer

== Chart performance ==
Chart (2006)	Peak position
US Billboard 200	76
US Billboard Top Rock Albums	25
