= Last Days at the Lodge =

Studio album by Amos Lee
- Released: June 24, 2008
- Genre: Folk, neo soul
- Length: 37:50
- Label: Blue Note
- Producer: Don Was

Amos Lee chronology
Supply and Demand (2006)	Last Days at the Lodge (2008)	Mission Bell (2011)

Professional ratings
Review scores
Source	Rating
AllMusic	3/5 stars

Last Days at the Lodge is the third studio album by singer-songwriter Amos Lee, released on June 24, 2008, through Blue Note. The first single from the album, "Listen," was made available as a digital download on the iTunes Store on April 29, 2008.

== Track listing ==
All songs written by Amos Lee.

1. "Listen" – 3:10
2. "Won't Let Me Go" – 4:17
3. "Baby I Want You" – 3:00
4. "Truth" – 3:23
5. "What's Been Going On" – 4:15
6. "Street Corner Preacher" – 3:14
7. "It Started to Rain" – 3:05
8. "Jails and Bombs" – 2:53
9. "Kid" – 3:11
10. "Ease Back" – 4:32
11. "Better Days" – 2:50
12. "Dignified Woman (iTunes exclusive bonus track)

== Chart performance ==
Chart (2008)	Peak position
US Billboard 200	29
US Billboard Top Rock Albums	11

== Personnel ==
The Band

- Amos Lee – vocals & guitars
- Doyle Bramhall II – guitar
- Spooner Oldham – keyboards
- Pino Palladino – bass guitar
- James Gadson – drums

Additional Musicians

- Rami Jaffee – keyboards on "Listen" & "What's Been Going On"
- Jamie Muhoberac – additional keyboards on "Won't Let Me Go" & "Jails & Bombs"
- Larry Gold – string arrangements on "Won't Let Me Go"
- Greg Leisz – pedal steel & banjo on "Baby I Want You" & "Ease Back"
- Justin Stanley – keyboards & bass guitar on "Street Corner Preacher", drums on "What's Been Going On" & "Street Corner Preacher", percussion on "What's Been Going On"
- Don Was – keyboards on "Kid", acoustic bass on "Ease Back"
- Patrick Leonard – harmonium & B-3 organ on "Kid"
- Amos Lee and Don Was – claps and stomps on "Street Corner Preacher"
