= My Ideal: A Tribute to Chet Baker Sings =

Studio album by Amos Lee
- Released: November 18, 2022
- Studio: Rittenhouse Soundworks, Philadelphia, Pennsylvania, United States
- Genre: Vocal jazz
- Length: 51:31
- Language: English
- Label: Dualtone Records
- Producer: David Stream

Amos Lee chronology
Dreamland (2022)	My Ideal: A Tribute to Chet Baker Sings (2022)	Honeysuckle Switches: The Songs of Lucinda Williams (2023)

"The breath work, the pitch control, the poignancy, the gaiety; the deeper I got inside the music, the more I fell in love with everything about it... it was a revelatory experience. It didn't just change the way I thought about these songs; it changed the way I thought about myself as a singer and a songwriter. It changed everything."

—Amos Lee on appreciating the work of Chet Baker

My Ideal: A Tribute to Chet Baker Sings is a 2022 studio album by American musician Amos Lee, covering the 1954 album Chet Baker Sings.

== Reception ==
Editors at AllMusic rated this album 3.5 out of 5 stars, with critic Matt Collar writing that covering the Great American Songbook is unexpected from Lee, whose music is generally made up of "rustic, countryfied folk and earthy R&B" and praised the vocal performance by Lee. In a feature from WBGO, Trevor Smith wrote that "Amos' voice reaches new, lustrous levels throughout the project" and the tracks include "irreplaceable entries in The Great American Songbook".

== Track listing ==
1. "That Old Feeling" (lyrics: Lew Brown, music: Sammy Fain) – 3:22
2. "It’s Always You" (lyrics: Johnny Burke, music: Jimmy Van Heusen) – 3:46
3. "Like Someone in Love" (lyrics: Burke, music: Van Heusen) – 2:31
4. "My Ideal" (lyrics: Leo Robin and Richard A. Whiting, music: Newell Chase) – 3:26
5. "I’ve Never Been in Love Before" (Frank Loesser) – 4:24
6. "My Buddy" (lyrics: Gus Kahn, music: Walter Donaldson) – 3:18
7. "But Not for Me" (lyrics: Ira Gershwin, music: George Gershwin) – 2:24
8. "Time After Time" (lyrics: Sammy Cahn, music: Jule Styne) – 2:51
9. "I Get Along Without You Very Well" (lyrics: Jane Brown Thompson, music: Hoagy Carmichael) – 2:54
10. "My Funny Valentine (For Oskar and Eli)" (lyrics: Lorenz Hart, music: Richard Rodgers) – 2:07
11. "There Will Never Be Another You" (lyrics: Mack Gordon, music: Harry Warren) – 3:10
12. "The Thrill Is Gone" (Jules Bihari, Rick Darnell, Roy Hawkins, and B. B. King) – 2:33
13. "I Fall in Love Too Easily" (lyrics: Cahn, music: Styne) – 3:24
14. "Look for the Silver Lining" (lyrics: Buddy DeSylva, music: Jerome Kern) – 2:46
15. "Everything Happens to Me" (lyrics: Tom Adair, music: Matt Dennis) – 3:06
16. "I’m Old Fashioned" (lyrics: Johnny Mercer, music: Kern) – 5:29

== Personnel ==
- Amos Lee – vocals, photography
- Greg Calbi – mastering
- Denise Guerin – photography
- Christian Langdon – mixing
- Gilberto Lopez – illustration
- Anwar Marshall – drums
- Madison Rast – double bass
- Michael Richelle – engineering
- David Striem – piano, trumpet, production
- Burton Yount – art direction

== See also ==
- 2022 in American music
- 2022 in jazz
- Lists of 2022 albums
