= The Impressionist =

Book by Hari Kunzru

- First edition (UK)
- Author: Hari Kunzru
- Language: English
- Genre: Historical novel
- Published: 2002
- Publisher: Hamish Hamilton (UK); E. P. Dutton (US)
- Publication place: United Kingdom

The Impressionist is the 2003 debut novel by British author Hari Kunzru. Kunzru received the Betty Trask Award and the Somerset Maugham Award for the book's publication.

== Plot ==
The novel concerns Pran Nath (known throughout the book by several other names), the child of a one-time affair between an English father and an Indian mother, and his life from birth to roughly the age of twenty-two, as he travels from India to England to Africa while colonialism begins to come to a close. As the narrative evolves, Pran takes on different personalities—some given to him by others, some willingly picked up to his advantage—as he seeks a permanent identity.

== Characters ==
- Pran Nath Razdan – The novel's protagonist, Pran Nath assumes several identities over the course of the plot. These include Rukhsana, the name given to him during his time spent with court eunuchs, Pretty Bobby, his name in Bombay, and Jonathan Bridgeman, his name in England, which he is able to assume through the identification papers of a British man who dies in his presence.
- Reverend Andrew Macfarlane – Andrew Macfarlane is a religious man working in Bombay. He pursues phrenology as a hobby, and employs Bobby in measuring skulls and photographing living subjects.
- Elspeth Macfarlane – Elspeth is married to Andrew, although she does not interact with her husband. She eschews Christianity in favor of Theosophy as a means to communicate with her sons, who both died in World War I.
- Astarte Chapel – Referred to as Star after Bridgemen meets her towards the end of the novel, Astarte is the daughter of an Oxford professor of Anthropology. Pran, as Jonathan, meets her at a party and the two enter into a relationship.

== Reception ==
The book was well received by critics, with praise for its prose. Kunzru's characterization of Pran was, however, faulted, with some considering him a "hollow" character.
