= Banu Onaral =

Turkish biomedical engineer (1949–2024)

- Born: June 15, 1949; Istanbul, Turkey
- Died: December 17, 2024 (aged 75); Philadelphia, Pennsylvania, U.S.
- Known for: Translational research and biomedical signal processing in ultrasound and optics
- Title: H.H. Sun Professor of Biomedical Engineering and Electrical Engineering, Drexel University, Philadelphia, Pennsylvania
- Spouse: Ibrahim Onaral
- Children: Mutlu Onaral
- Relatives: Nuri Demirağ (grandfather)

Banu Onaral (June 15, 1949 – December 17, 2024) was a Turkish academic who was the H.H. Sun Professor of Biomedical Engineering and Electrical Engineering at Drexel University in Philadelphia, Pennsylvania.

In 1997, she founded Drexel University's School of Biomedical Engineering Science and Health Systems.

== Education ==
For her secondary education, Onaral had attended the Notre Dame de Sion French Girls' High School in Istanbul, Turkey. Onaral earned a Ph.D. in Biomedical Engineering from the University of Pennsylvania in 1978, and a BSEE and MSEE in Electrical Engineering from Boğaziçi University in Istanbul, Turkey in 1973 and 1974, respectively.

== Academic and research career ==
Onaral joined the faculty of the Department of Electrical and Computer Engineering and the Biomedical Engineering and Science Institute in 1981. She held two sabbatical leaves at Boğaziçi University in the academic years 1980–1981 and 1987–1988.

From 1997, she served as the founding director of the School of Biomedical Engineering Science and Health Systems.

Her academic focus in both research and teaching was centered on information engineering with special emphasis on complex systems and biomedical signal processing in ultrasound and optics. She led major research and development projects sponsored by the National Science Foundation (NSF), National Institutes of Health (NIH), Office of Naval Research (ONR), DARPA and Department of Homeland Security (DHS). She supervised a large number of graduate students to degree completion and had an extensive publication record in biomedical signals and systems. She was the recipient of a number of faculty excellence awards including the 1990 Lindback Distinguished Teaching Award of Drexel University, the EDUCOM Best Educational Software Award and the NSF Faculty Achievement Award.

Onaral’s translational research efforts for rapid commercialization of biomedical technologies developed at Drexel and its partner institutions resulted in the creation of the Translational Research in Biomedical Technologies program. This initiative brought together academic technology developers with entrepreneurs, regional economic development agencies, local legal, business and investment communities. Under her leadership, the program was recognized by the Coulter Translational Research Partnership award following a highly competitive selection process among sixty-three institutions in North America. At the end of the five-year term, universities successful in institutionalizing translational research received an endowment to ensure the perpetuity of the program.

Onaral’s professional services included chair and membership on advisory boards and strategic planning bodies of several universities and funding agencies, including service on the National Science Foundation's Engineering Advisory Board, and on the proposal review panels and study sections. She served on the strategic planning team charged with the creation of Sabancı University in Istanbul, Turkey.

Her professional responsibilities included service on the editorial board of journals and the CRC Biomedical Engineering Handbook as Section Editor for Biomedical Signal Analysis. She served as president of the IEEE Engineering in Medicine and Biology Society (EMBS), the largest member-based biomedical engineering society in the world. She organized and chaired the 1990 Annual International Conference of the EMBS and Co-Chaired the 2004 Annual Conference of the Biomedical Engineering. She was a Fellow of the IEEE Engineering in Medicine and Biology Society, the American Association for the Advancement of Science (AAAS) and a Founding Fellow of American Institute for Medical and Biological Engineering (AIMBE). She served on the inaugural Board of the AIMBE as publications chair and as Chair of the Academic Council and as the President of the Turkish American Scientists and Scholars Association.

== Personal life and death ==
Her son is the American soul singer Mutlu Onaral, who performs as Mutlu. She was the granddaughter of Turkish industrialist and business magnate Nuri Demirağ. Her husband is Ibrahim Onaral.

Onaral died after a long battle with cancer in Philadelphia, United States, on December 17, 2024, at the age of 75.
