= Walter Gemma =

1930s Czech piston aircraft engine

Gemma
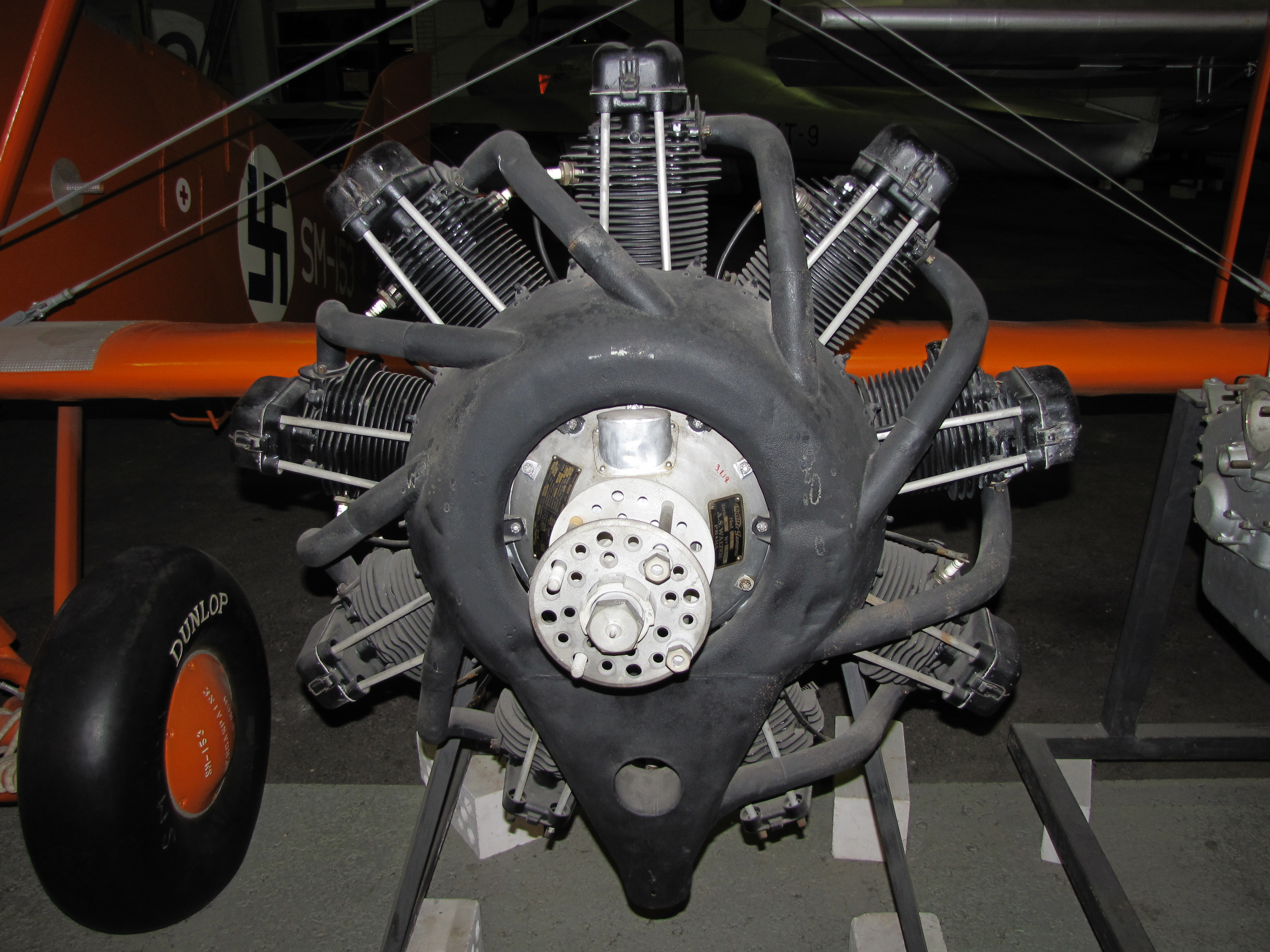
- Walter Gemma on display at the Finnish Aviation Museum
- Type: Radial aero engine
- National origin: Czechoslovakia
- Manufacturer: Walter Aircraft Engines
- First run: c. 1934

The Walter Gemma was a Czechoslovak nine-cylinder, air-cooled, radial aero engine that was developed and manufactured in the early 1930s by Walter Aircraft Engines.

== Applications ==
- Nuri Demirağ Nu D.36
- Praga E-39

== Engines on display ==
A preserved example of the Walter Gemma engine is on display at the following museum:

- Finnish Aviation Museum

== Specifications ==
Data from Flight.

=== General characteristics ===
- Type: 9-cylinder radial piston engine
- Bore: 105 mm (4.1 in)
- Stroke: 120 mm (4.7 in)
- Displacement: 9.35 L (571 cu in)

=== Components ===
- Valvetrain: One intake and one exhaust valve per cylinder
- Fuel system: Zenith carburettor
- Fuel type: Petrol
- Cooling system: Air-cooled

=== Performance ===
- Power output: 123 kW (165 hp)

== See also ==
Comparable engines

- Wolseley Aries

Related lists

- List of aircraft engines
