= Mission Bell (Amos Lee album) =

Studio album by Amos Lee
- Released: January 25, 2011
- Genre: Folk, neo soul
- Length: 51:17
- Label: Blue Note
- Producer: Joey Burns

Amos Lee chronology
Last Days at the Lodge (2008)	Mission Bell (2011)	As the Crow Flies (2012)

Mission Bell is the fourth studio album by American musician Amos Lee, released on January 25, 2011. The album features Willie Nelson, Lucinda Williams, Sam Beam, Priscilla Ahn, Pieta Brown, James Gadson, and Calexico. Joey Burns, of Calexico, produced the album. Mission Bell debuted at #1 on the Billboard 200, selling 40,000 copies in its first week, which is the lowest total for a #1 album in the Soundscan era. These sales broke the record set by Cake's Showroom of Compassion when it sold 44,000 two weeks previous. The following week Mission Bell dropped from #1 to #26, the fourth-largest drop from #1 on the Billboard 200 as of January 2017. It shares this honor with the 1975's 2016 album I Like It When You Sleep, for You Are So Beautiful yet So Unaware of It.

== Track listing ==
All songs written by Amos Lee.

1. El Camino – 4:02
2. Windows Are Rolled Down – 3:57
3. Violin (featuring Sam Beam) – 5:18
4. Flower – 3:41
5. Stay with Me (featuring Priscilla Ahn) – 3:13
6. Out of the Cold (featuring Pieta Brown) – 3:03
7. Jesus (featuring James Gadson) – 3:21
8. Hello Again – 4:09
9. Learned a Lot – 4:30
10. Cup of Sorrow – 3:51
11. Clear Blue Eyes (featuring Lucinda Williams) – 3:02
12. Behind Me Now / El Camino Reprise (featuring Willie Nelson) – 9:10

== Personnel ==
- Amos Lee – vocal, guitar, fuzz guitar, vibraphone
- Joey Burns – bass, guitar, backing vocal, keyboards, vibraphone
- Jaron Olevsky – keyboards, percussion, backing vocal, bass, guitar, banjo
- Greg Leisz – steel guitar, guitar, mandolin, dobro
- John Convertino – drums, thunder drum
- James Gadson – drums, tambourine, backing vocal
- Jacob Valenzuela – trumpets
- Craig Schumacher – synth bass, harmonica
- Johnny O'Halloran – bowed saw
- Brian Lopez – backing vocal
- Sam Beam – backing vocal
- Priscilla Ahn – backing vocal
- Pieta Brown – backing vocal
- Zach Djanikian – backing vocal
- Mutlu Onaral – backing vocal
- Lucinda Williams – vocal
- Willie Nelson – vocal, nylon string guitar

Silver Thread Trio:

- Gabrielle Pietrangelo – backing vocal
- Laura Kepner-Adney – backing vocal
- Caroline Isaacs – backing vocal

== Charts ==
=== Weekly charts ===
Chart (2011)	Peak position
Dutch Albums (Album Top 100)	39
German Albums (Offizielle Top 100)	98
Swiss Albums (Schweizer Hitparade)	61
US Billboard 200	1
US Top Rock Albums (Billboard)	1
US Indie Store Album Sales (Billboard)	6

=== Year-end charts ===
Chart (2011)	Position
US Top Rock Albums (Billboard)	57
