= As the Crow Flies (EP) =

EP by Amos Lee
- Released: February 10, 2012
- Studio: Wavelab Studio, Tucson, Arizona, US
- Genre: Blues folk
- Length: 24:47
- Language: English
- Label: Blue Note Records
- Producer: Joey Burns

Amos Lee chronology
Mission Bell (2011)	As the Crow Flies (2012)	Mountains of Sorrow, Rivers of Song (2013)

As the Crow Flies is a 2012 extended play by American musician Amos Lee. It has received positive reviews from critics.

== Reception ==
Editors at AllMusic rated this album 3.5 out of 5 stars, with critic Matt Collar writing the songs "are as good as anything on Mission Bell" and this EP is a "must-hear for Lee fans". In Entertainment Weekly, Ray Rahman scored this release a B, highlighting "The Darkness" in particular. PopMatters' Matt Cibula rated this album a 6 out of 10, stating that "all these tracks could have found a home on that record without diminishing its quality" and this music is good for fans of this genre. Writing for Spin, David Marchese rated this work a 5 out of 10, writing, "wistful folkie explores mildly darker corners, still finds soothing clichés amongst the mandolins".

== Track listing ==
All songs written by Amos Lee.

1. "The Darkness" – 4:40
2. "Simple Things" – 3:21
3. "Say Goodbye" – 2:50
4. "May I Remind You" – 4:40
5. "Mama Sail to Me" – 4:12
6. "There I Go Again" – 5:05

== Personnel ==
- Amos Lee – acoustic guitar, vocals, electric guitar on "The Darkness" and "There I Go Again"
- Joey Burns – double bass on "The Darkness", "Simple Things", and "Mama Sail to Me"; electric bass guitar on ""Say Goodbye" and "There I Got Again"; cello on "The Darkness"; electric guitar on "The Darkness"; accordion on "Mama Sail to Me"; mandolin on "Mama Sail to Me"; slide guitar on "Mama Sail to Me"; vibraphone on "Mama Sail to Me"; mandolin on "There I Go Again"; backing vocals on "Say Goodbye"; production
- John Convertino – membranophone on "The Darkness", "Say Goodbye", "May I Remind You", "Mama Sail to Me", and "There I Go Again"; percussion on "The Darkness", "May I Remind You" and "Mama Sail to Me"
- JJ Golden – mastering at Golden Mastering, Ventura, California, United States
- Tom Hagerman – viola on "The Darkness", violin on "The Darkness"
- Gordon H. Jee – creative direction
- Greg Leisz – slide guitar on "Simple Things" and "May I Remind You", electric guitar on "Say Goodbye"
- David Mansfield – viola on "May I Remind You", violin on "May I Remind You"
- Jen Musari – illustrations
- Sydney Nichols – art direction, design
- Jaron Olevsky – piano on "The Darkness", "Simple Things", "May I Remind You", and "Mama Sail to Me"; organ on "The Darkness", "Mama Sail to Me", and "There I Go Again"; double bass on "Say Goodbye" and "May I Remind You"; mandolin on "Say Goodbye and "There I Go Again"; bass guitar on "May I Remind You" and "There I Go Again"; glockenspiel on "Simple Things"; accordion on "Say Goodbye"; slide guitar on "Say Goodbye"; vibraphone on "Say Goodbye"; Moog synthesizer on "There I Go Again"; Wurlitzer electric piano on "There I Go Again"; backing vocals on "Say Goodbye"
- Craig Schumacher – tambourine on "There I Go Again", mixing

== Chart performance ==
As the Crow Flies peaked at 16 on Billboard's Top Rock Albums and 67 on the Billboard 200.

== See also ==
- 2012 in American music
- List of 2012 albums
