= Gods Without Men =

Book by Hari Kunzru

- First edition
- Author: Hari Kunzru
- Language: English
- Published: 2011
- Publisher: Hamish Hamilton
- Publication place: United Kingdom

Gods Without Men is Hari Kunzru's fourth novel, first published in 2011. The title is a quotation from Honoré de Balzac. The novel is set in the American southwest, and contains elements of magical realism.

== Plot ==
Although there are many other settings, both geographically and temporally, the novel's action mostly takes place in the southwestern United States. The plot is centered on a family trip by Jaz and Lisa Matharu with their severely autistic son, Raj. During the trip, Raj disappears and subsequently returns to his parents. The book also has several subplots which interact with the central storyline, including one about a cult founded by "Schmidt", a bomber pilot who served the United States during World War II, one surrounding an English rockstar trying to find himself in the United States, one about an Iraqi girl participating in a military simulation with her uncle, and one surrounding the journals of a Spanish missionary who traversed the same parts of California. The novel is told from the point of view of nine different characters, and touches on many themes such as religion, emotion, trauma, and human connection.

== Reception ==
The novel was well received by critics. Notably, in his New York Times review of the book, Douglas Coupland coined the term "translit" in reference to the novel and other similar works. He defines the term as a genre in which "...novels cross history without being historical; they span geography without changing psychic place...". Coupland cites The Hours and Cloud Atlas as contemporary "tentpoles" of the genre.
