= Spirit (Amos Lee album) =

Studio album by Amos Lee
- Released: August 16, 2016
- Genre: Folk rock, Neo soul
- Length: 47:52
- Label: John Varvatos/Republic
- Producer: Amos Lee

Amos Lee chronology
Mountains of Sorrow, Rivers of Song (2013)	Spirit (2016)	My New Moon (2018)

Professional ratings
Review scores
Source	Rating
AllMusic	4.5/5 stars

Spirit is the sixth studio album by singer-songwriter Amos Lee. It was released August 16, 2016 on the John Varvatos imprint of Republic Records, Lee's first album on a label other than Blue Note Records. It is also the first album which Lee self-produced. Like all previous albums, Lee penned all thirteen songs.

The album debuted on the Billboard Top Rock Albums chart at No. 3, selling 12,000 copies in its first week.

== Track listing ==
All songs written by Amos Lee

1. "New Love" – 3:45
2. "Running Out of Time" – 3:19
3. "Spirit" – 4:50
4. "Lost Child" – 3:54
5. "Highways and Clouds" – 3:29
6. "Lightly" – 3:00
7. "One Lonely Light" – 3:35
8. "Wait Up for Me" – 3:45
9. "Till You Come Back Through" – 3:02
10. "Hurt Me" – 3:17
11. "Vaporize" – 3:51
12. "Walls" – 4:38
13. "With You" – 3:27

== Personnel ==
- Amos Lee – vocals, acoustic and electric guitar, banjo, percussion, background vocals
- Jaron Olevsky – keyboards [piano, organ, glockenspiel, synthesizer] (all), bass (3, 8, 10), accordion (8), background vocals (5)
- Zach Djanikian – electric guitar (2, 6, 7, 9, 12), bass (5), saxophone (5), mandolin (7, 8), synthesizer (11), background vocals (5, 12)
- Mark Colenburg – drums, percussion (1, 2, 4, 6, 9, 11, 12)
- Adam Blackstone – bass (1, 2, 4, 6, 9, 11, 12)
- Ian Fitchuk – drums, percussion (3, 4, 5, 7), background vocals (5)
- Fred Berman – drums (8, 10)
- Doug Pettibone – electric guitar (2, 3, 10), pedal steel (10, 11)
- Luther Dickinson – electric guitar, background vocals (5)
- Andy Keenan – dobro (3), lap steel (6)
- Jeff Coffin – saxophone (1, 2, 4)
- Rashawn Ross – trumpet (1, 2, 4)
- Rob Moose – violin, viola (9, 10, 11, 12, 13)
- Anthony LaMarchina – cello (10, 13)
- Vanessa McGowan – contrabass (10), bowed bass (13)
- Annie Clements – background vocals (1, 2, 6, 7, 8, 12)
- Kristen Rogers – background vocals (2, 6, 7, 12)
- Jason Eskridge – background vocals (2, 3, 6, 7, 9)
