= Hari Kunzru =

British novelist and journalist

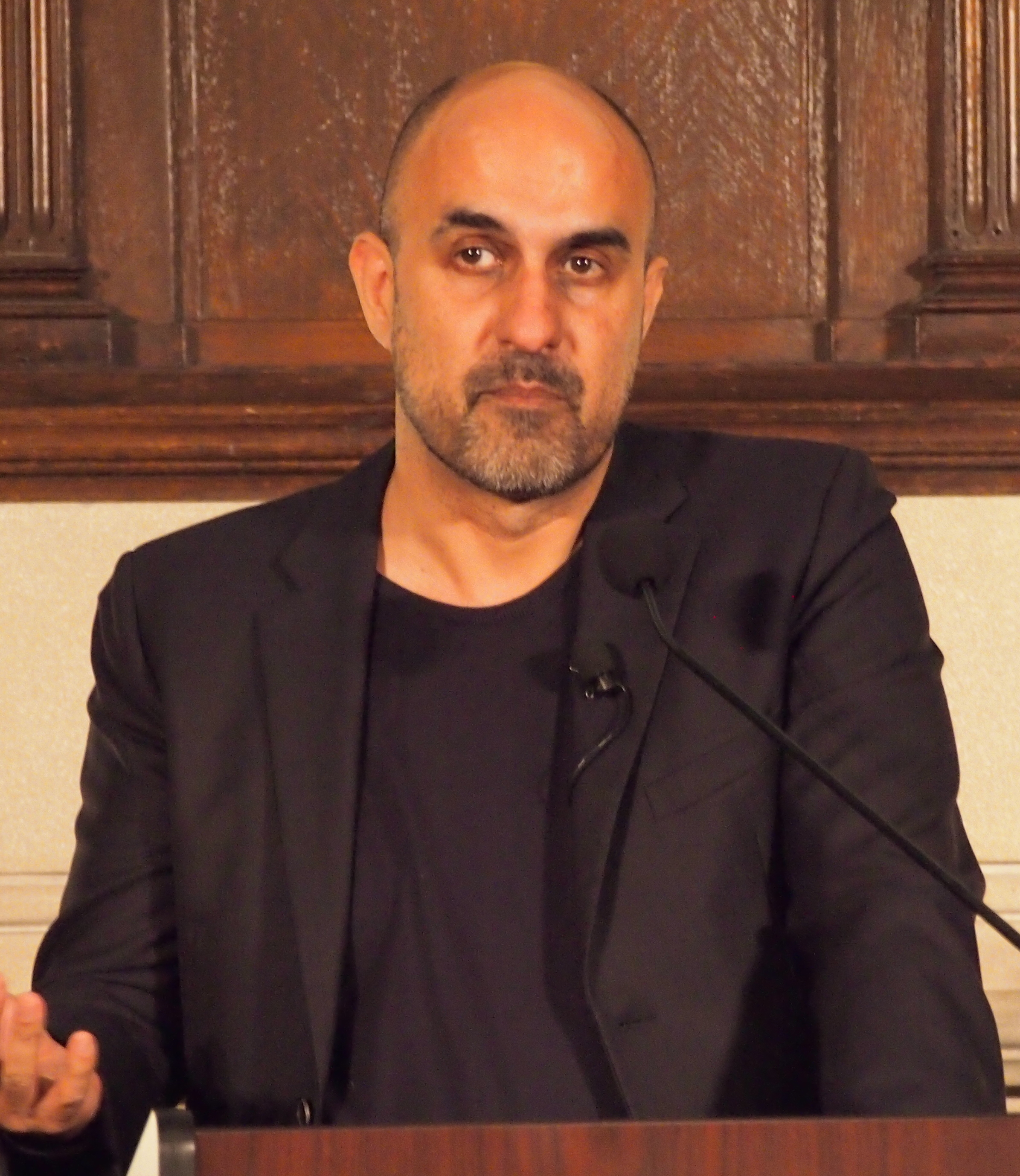
- Born: Hari Mohan Nath Kunzru; 1969 (age 56–57); London, England
- Education: Wadham College, Oxford; Warwick University
- Occupations: Author, journalist
- Spouse: Katie Kitamura
- Children: 2
- Writing career
- Language: English
- Genre: Literary fiction
- Notable works: Gods without Men; White Tears; Red Pill
- Website: harikunzru.com

Hari Mohan Nath Kunzru (born 1969) is a British novelist and journalist. He is the author of the novels The Impressionist, Transmission, My Revolutions, Gods Without Men, White Tears, Red Pill, and Blue Ruin. His work has been translated into 20 languages.

== Early life and education ==
Kunzru was born in London, England, to an Indian father of Kashmiri Pandit descent and a British mother. He grew up in Essex and was educated at Bancroft's School. He studied English at Wadham College, Oxford, then gained an MA in Philosophy and Literature from University of Warwick. In his teens, Kunzru decided that he did not believe in formal religion or God, and is "opposed to how religion is used to police people".

== Career ==
From 1995 to 1997, Kunzru worked on Wired UK. Since 1998, he has worked as a travel journalist, writing for such newspapers as The Guardian and The Daily Telegraph. He was a travel correspondent for Time Out magazine, and worked as a TV presenter interviewing artists for the Sky TV electronic arts programme The Lounge. From 1999 to 2004 he was also music editor of Wallpaper* magazine, and since 1995 he has been a contributing editor to Mute, the culture and technology magazine. His first novel, The Impressionist (2003), had a £1 million-plus advance and was well received critically with excellent sales. His second novel, Transmission, was published in 2004. In 2005 he published the short-story collection Noise. His third novel, My Revolutions, was published in 2007. His fourth novel, Gods Without Men, was released in 2011. Set in the American southwest, it is a fractured story about multiple characters across time. It has been compared to David Mitchell's Cloud Atlas. His novel Blue Ruin appeared in May 2024.

In 2004 the "supersonic supernatural drama" Sound Mirrors was dramatised as part of the BBC Radio 3 drama strand, The Wire. It was a collaboration between Kunzru and DJ producers Coldcut.

Kunzru was awarded The John Llewellyn Rhys prize for writers under 35, the second-oldest literary prize in the UK, but turned it down on the grounds that it was backed by the Mail on Sunday whose "hostility towards black and Asian people" he felt was unacceptable.

He is Deputy President of English PEN. He also teaches in the creative writing program at New York University.

== Politics and activism ==
In 2009, he donated the short story "Kaltes klares Wasser" to Oxfam's Ox-Tales project, four collections of UK stories by 38 authors. Kunzru's story was published in the Water collection.

In 2012, at the Jaipur Literature Festival, Kunzru and three other authors, Ruchir Joshi, Jeet Thayil, and Amitava Kumar, risked arrest by reading excerpts from Salman Rushdie's The Satanic Verses, which was banned in India due to fear of controversy until November 5th of 2024. Kunzru later wrote, "Our intention was not to offend anyone's religious sensibilities, but to give a voice to a writer who had been silenced by a death threat." The reading drew sharp criticism from Muslim groups as a deliberately provocative move to gain publicity for the four authors. Kunzru admitted in an interview that the festival organizers asked him to leave as his presence was likely to "inflame an already volatile situation."

In 2016, Kunzru visited Israel, as part of a project by the "Breaking the Silence" organization, to write an article for a book on the Israeli occupation, to mark the 50th anniversary of the Six-Day War. The book was edited by Michael Chabon and Ayelet Waldman, and published in 2017 under the title Kingdom of Olives and Ash: Writers Confront the Occupation. During the Gaza War, he announced that he supports a boycott of Israeli cultural institutions, including publishers and literary festivals. He was an original signatory of the manifesto "Refusing Complicity in Israel's Literary Institutions".

== Personal life ==
Kunzru is married to novelist Katie Kitamura, and the couple have two children. Kunzru is fascinated by UFOs and as a youngster often imagined a close-encounter experience with one.

== Honours ==
- 1999: The Observer Young Travel Writer of the Year
- 2002: Betty Trask Award, The Impressionist
- 2003: Somerset Maugham Award, The Impressionist
- 2003: Granta "Best of Young British Novelists" (one of twenty)
- 2005: New York Times Notable Book of the Year, Transmission
- 2005: Lire "50 écrivains pour demain"
- 2014: Elected Fellow of the Royal Society of Literature

== Bibliography ==
=== Books ===
- 2002: The Impressionist. London: Hamish Hamilton. ISBN 9780241141694, OCLC 953648874
- 2004: Transmission. London: Hamish Hamilton. ISBN 9780141020952, OCLC 485832981
- 2005: Noise. London: Penguin. ISBN 9780141023106, OCLC 835475787
- 2007: My Revolutions. London: Penguin. OCLC 920237941
- 2011: Gods Without Men. London: Penguin. ISBN 9780307946973, OCLC 864345036
- 2013: Memory Palace. London: Victoria and Albert Museum. ISBN 9781851777365
- 2014: Twice Upon a Time: Listening to New York. New York: Atavist. ISBN 9780671456337
- 2017: White Tears, New York: Knopf ISBN 9781101973219, OCLC 989962274
- 2020: Red Pill, New York: Knopf ISBN 9780451493712, OCLC 1129915075
- 2024: Blue Ruin, London: Scribner ISBN 9780593801376, OCLC 1388209656

=== Essays and reporting ===
- "Death valley". Easy Chair. Harper's Magazine. 343 (2056): 5–7. September 2021.
