= Amos Lee (album) =

Studio album by Amos Lee
- Released: March 1, 2005
- Recorded: July 2004
- Studio: Magic Shop, New York City
- Genre: Pop rock, R&B
- Length: 35:47
- Label: Blue Note
- Producer: Lee Alexander

Amos Lee chronology
Amos Lee (2005)	Supply and Demand (2006)

Professional ratings
Review scores
Source	Rating
Allmusic	3.5/5 stars

Amos Lee is the debut album by American singer and songwriter Amos Lee. The album was released by Blue Note on March 1, 2005, and produced by Lee Alexander, who played bass for Norah Jones.

== Track listing ==
All tracks written by Amos Lee.

1. "Keep It Loose, Keep It Tight" – 3:08
2. "Seen It All Before" – 4:15
3. "Arms of a Woman" – 4:11
4. "Give It Up" – 2:38
5. "Dreamin'" – 2:54
6. "Soul Suckers" – 2:49
7. "Colors" – 2:40
8. "Bottom of the Barrel" – 2:00
9. "Black River" – 3:31
10. "Love In the Lies" – 3:22
11. "All My Friends" – 4:18

== Personnel ==
- Amos Lee - guitar, vocals; background vocals (4)
- Lee Alexander - bass (2, 3, 5, 8, 9, 10), pulp drum (9), producer, mixing
- Fred Berman - drums (3, 5, 7, 11), background vocals (4)
- Kevin Breit - acoustic guitar (8), mandolin (8), resonator guitar (9)
- Adam Levy - electric guitar (2, 3, 5, 10), background vocals (4)
- James Gadson - drums (2), background vocals (4)
- Larry Gold - cello (1, 6), string arrangements (6)
- Zara Bodé - background vocals (2)
- Devin Greenwood - Hammond B3 (2, 4, 10), background vocals (2), Wurlitzer (3, 11)
- Norah Jones - piano (1, 7), background vocals (7), Wurlitzer (7)
- Alexandra Leem - viola (6)
- Jaron Olevsky - bass (1, 7, 11)
- Dan Rieser - drums (1, 10)
- Nate Skiltes - mandolin (7)
- Chris Thomas - bass (4)

Credits:

- Barrie Maguire - Producer ("All My Friends"), Engineer
- Steve Mazur - Assistant Engineer
- Clay Patrick McBride - Cover Photo
- Billy Joe Walker Jr. - Engineer
- Eli Wolf - A&R
- Jessica Novod Berenblat - Art Direction
- Matt Boynton - Engineer
- Greg Calbi - Mastering
- Chris Cofoni - A&R
- Danny Markowitz - A&R
- Bill Eib - Management
- Perry Greenfield - Product Manager
- Denise Guerin - Photography
- Gordon Jee - Creative Director
- Danny Kopelson - Engineer, Mixing
- Jeff Kramer - Management

== Charts ==
=== Weekly charts ===
Chart (2005)	Peak position
Austrian Albums (Ö3 Austria)	72
Belgian Albums (Ultratop Flanders)	73
Dutch Albums (Album Top 100)	13
French Albums (SNEP)	112
German Albums (Offizielle Top 100)	75
Italian Albums (FIMI)	82
US Billboard 200	113
US Heatseekers Albums (Billboard)	2

=== Year-end charts ===
Chart (2005)	Position
Dutch Albums (Album Top 100)	84

== Certifications ==
Region	Certification	Certified units/sales
United States (RIAA)	Gold	500,000^{‡}
^{‡} Sales+streaming figures based on certification alone.
