= Amos Lee =

American singer-songwriter (born 1977)

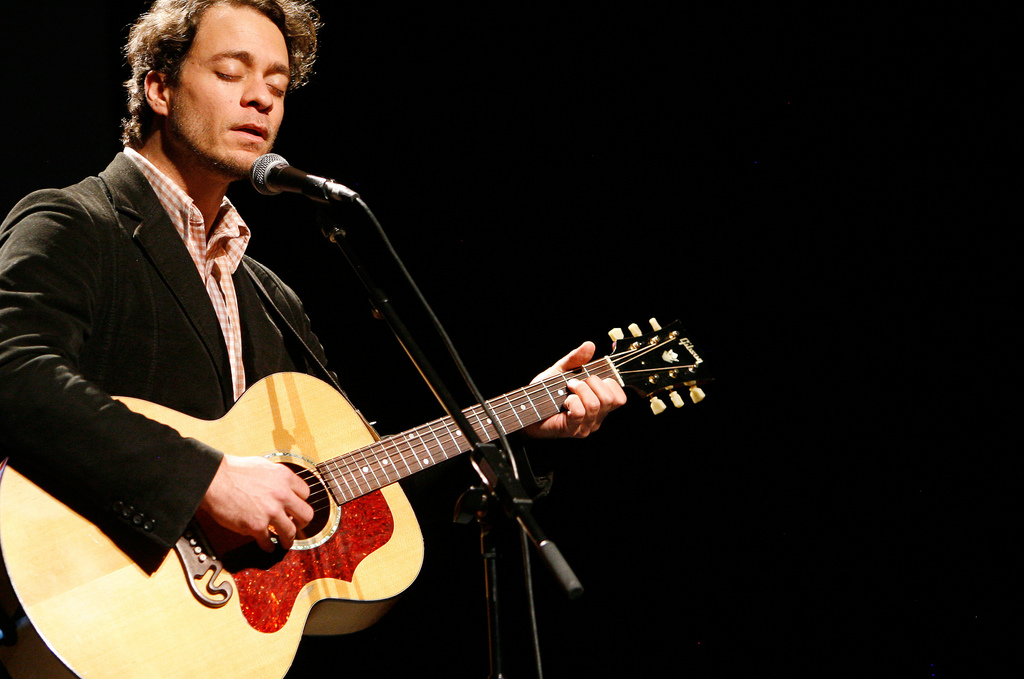
- Lee performing at Poptech in 2008

Background information
- Born: Ryan Anthony Massaro; June 22, 1977 (age 49)
- Origin: Philadelphia, Pennsylvania, U.S.
- Genres: Folk, soul, jazz, Americana, roots rock, Country
- Occupations: Singer-songwriter, musician
- Instruments: Guitar, vocals
- Years active: 2004–present
- Labels: Blue Note; John Varvatos; Republic; Dualtone; Hoagiemouth
- Website: amoslee.com

Amos Lee (born Ryan Anthony Massaro, June 22, 1977) is an American singer-songwriter whose musical style encompasses folk, rock, and soul.

Lee has recorded five albums on Blue Note Records and has toured as an opening act for Norah Jones, Bob Dylan, Elvis Costello, Paul Simon, Merle Haggard, Van Morrison, John Prine, Dave Matthews Band, Adele, the Zac Brown Band, Jack Johnson, The Avett Brothers, and David Gray. His music has appeared on the soundtracks of numerous TV shows and movies. He has performed as a featured artist on the PBS series Bluegrass Underground, on several late night TV shows, and at a voter registration rally for Barack Obama. In 2011, his album Mission Bell debuted at No. 1 on the Billboard 200 chart.

== Early life and education ==
Lee was born Ryan Anthony Massaro in 1977 and was raised in Kensington, Philadelphia. He moved to Cherry Hill, New Jersey, at age 11 and graduated from Cherry Hill High School East. Lee attended the University of South Carolina and graduated with a degree in English and a minor in education. During his college years, he developed an interest in music after being inspired by Great Days: The John Prine Anthology. During this period, he began playing the guitar and bass as part of a band and listening to the music of Donny Hathaway, Joni Mitchell, Luther Vandross, Bill Withers, and Otis Redding.

== Career ==
After returning to Philadelphia, Lee worked as a second grade teacher at the Mary McLeod Bethune School and as a bartender at local music venues. He performed at open mic events in the area and, through his manager Bill Eib's contacts with promoters, was hired as an opening act for Mose Allison and B.B. King.

In 2003, Lee's manager Bill Eib sent a four-song demo CD to several record labels, and the representative at Blue Note Records was "immediately struck by his [Lee's] voice". Afterwards, Norah Jones heard Lee's music while visiting the record company and invited Lee to be the opening act for her 2004 tour.

The friendship between Lee's manager Bill Eib and Bob Dylan's manager Jeff Kramer resulted in Lee touring with Dylan as his opening act in early 2005. Later, Lee began touring on his own and recorded his self-titled and "widely praised" debut album of "subtle, folky soul" produced by Norah Jones' bassist, Lee Alexander which included vocals and instrumentation by Norah Jones and members of her band. After it was released, the album peaked at No. 2 on the Billboard Top Heatseekers chart and Lee was named one of Rolling Stone's "Top 10 Artists to Watch." One song from the album, called "Colors", appeared on TV shows Grey's Anatomy and House and in the film Just Like Heaven. Lee's music received additional media attention when he performed on late-night TV shows such as the Late Show with David Letterman and The Tonight Show with Jay Leno.

In 2006, Lee recorded his second album, Supply and Demand, which was produced by a friend of manager Bill Eib, Philadelphia musician and producer Barrie Maguire. An NPR Music reviewer described it as having "more complicated instrumentation and production" than his prior work. The song "Shout Out Loud" was released as a single and peaked at No. 76 on the Billboard 200, and another song, called "Sweet Pea", was used in an AT&T ad campaign.

Lee's third studio album, Last Days at the Lodge was released in 2008 and re-emphasized "his grounding in folk and soul". The album peaked at number 29 on the Billboard 200 chart and Lee performed at the Change Rocks voter registration rally for Barack Obama in Philadelphia that summer opening for Bruce Springsteen.

In 2011, Lee released his fourth album on Blue Note Records, entitled Mission Bell which was produced by Joey Burns of Calexico. The album debuted at number one on the Billboard 200 chart, number one on the Digital Albums chart, number two on the Internet chart, and number one on the Amazon Top-Selling Albums and iTunes charts. The album's single, "Windows are Rolled Down", became a top 10 hit on USA Today's adult-alternative chart. However, the album also has the dubious distinction of being the lowest-selling, number one Billboard album as of 2011 selling only 40,000 copies. Guest artists on the album included Lucinda Williams, Willie Nelson, Priscilla Ahn, Pieta Brown, James Gadson, and Sam Beam.

Lee appeared at Farm Aid 2013 and on the compilation album, The Music Is You: A Tribute to John Denver. He released his fifth studio album, Mountains Of Sorrow, Rivers Of Song in October 2013. Lee concludes his successful US tour in 2022 in New Orleans on Halloween night debuting selections from his album Dreamland album including his biggest hit in over a decade, "Worry No More".

Lee's longtime touring band consists of Jaron Olevksy (piano, keyboards), Zach Djanikian (guitar, mandolin, saxophone, background vocals), Jay White (bass, background vocals), Ryan Hommel (guitar, background vocals), David Streim (keyboards, trumpet) and James Williams (drums).

== Reception ==
Lee's "folksy, bluesy sound" has been compared to that of John Prine and Norah Jones. His music is said to utilize the "supple funk of his vocals and arid strum of his guitar" while recalling "the low-volume, early-'70s acoustic soul of stars like Bill Withers and Minnie Ripperton". A New York Times music critic described Lee as having a "honeyed singing voice – light amber, mildly sweet, a touch of grain" which he features "squarely, without much fuss or undue strain" in his "1970s folk rock and rustic soul" musical song craft. According to a music writer at ABC News, Lee "has that folksy, bluesy vibe, with a bit of country twang" and a voice that is "ever soulful". Simultaneously Lee has been both lauded and dismissed as the "male Norah Jones" and his lyrics are said to convey "the complexities of everyday emotions" without falling into flowery imagery. Lee's songs have appeared on a number of TV shows including House and Parenthood.

His song "Skipping Stone" was also featured in the soundtrack to the 2006 film My Blueberry Nights.

== Personal life ==
Amos Lee describes himself as being of mixed heritage; he admits he is not fully aware of his background. He maintains a residence in West Philadelphia.

He took the stage name "Amos Lee" because he got sick of people mispronouncing his real name.

He makes appearances on the Rights to Ricky Sanchez including recording the theme song and occasionally appears as the character of Tony Toni Tatone.

His mother, step-father, and father always attended his early shows in Philadelphia around the year 2000, starting at the Tin Angel, a listening room where Amos Lee worked as a bartender. Fans also regularly saw them years later in New York City at various venues as his success was increasing.

== Discography ==
=== Studio albums ===
Title	Details	Peak chart positions							Certifications
Title	Details	US	US Rock	AUT	FRA	GER	NL	SWI	Certifications
Amos Lee	Release date: March 1, 2005; Label: Blue Note; Formats: Vinyl, CD, digital download	113	—	72	112	75	13	—	RIAA: Gold
Supply and Demand	Release date: October 3, 2006; Label: Blue Note; Formats: CD, digital download	76	25	—	—	—	23	—	
Last Days at the Lodge	Release date: June 24, 2008; Label: Blue Note; Formats: CD, digital download	29	11	—	—	—	—	—	
Mission Bell	Release date: January 25, 2011; Label: Blue Note; Formats: CD, digital download	1	1	—	—	98	39	61	
Mountains of Sorrow, Rivers of Song	Release date: October 8, 2013; Label: Blue Note; Formats: CD, music download, vinyl	16	7	—	—	—	—	—	
Spirit	Release date: August 16, 2016; Label: John Varvatos, Republic; Formats: CD, LP, digital download	30	3	—	—	—	—	—	
My New Moon	Release date: August 31, 2018; Label: Dualtone Music; Formats: CD, LP, digital download, streaming	49	4	—	—	—	—	—	
Dreamland	Release date: February 11, 2022; Label: Dualtone Music; Formats: CD, LP, digital download, streaming	—	39	—	—	—	—	—	
My Ideal: A Tribute to Chet Baker Sings	Release date: November 18, 2022; Label: Dualtone Music; Formats: CD, LP, digital download, streaming	—	—	—	—	—	—	—	
Honeysuckle Switches: The Songs of Lucinda Williams	Release date: November 24, 2023; Label: Hoagiemouth; Formats: CD, LP, digital download, streaming	—	—	—	—	—	—	—	
Transmissions	Release date: August 9, 2024; Label: Hoagiemouth; Formats: CD, LP, digital download, streaming	—	—	—	—	—	—	—	
"—" denotes releases that did not chart

=== Live albums ===
Title	Details	Peak chart positions		
Title	Details	US	US Rock	US Folk
Live from the Artists Den	Release date: January 9, 2013; Label: Artists Den Records; Formats: Digital download	—	—	—
Live at Red Rocks (Amos Lee with The Colorado Symphony)	Release date: June 16, 2015; Label: ATO Records; Formats: CD, digital download, vinyl	103	16	4

=== Extended plays ===
Title	Details	Peak chart positions	
Title	Details	US	US Rock
Amos Lee (EP)	Release date: 2004; Label: Blue Note; Formats: CD, music download	—	—
Live from KCRW	Release date: 2005; Label: Blue Note; Formats: CD, music download	—	—
As the Crow Flies	Release date: February 14, 2012; Label: Blue Note; Formats: CD, music download, 10" vinyl	67	16
"—" denotes releases that did not chart

=== DVDs ===
- Live From Austin, Texas – (2008) New West
- Amos Lee: Live from the Artists Den – (2013)

=== Singles ===
==== As lead artist ====
Title	Year	Peak chart positions	Album
Title	Year	US AAA	Album
"Keep It Loose, Keep It Tight"	2005	19	Amos Lee
"Shout Out Loud"	2006	7	Supply and Demand
"Listen"	2008	11	Last Days at the Lodge
"What's Been Going On"	2008	10	Last Days at the Lodge
"Windows Are Rolled Down"	2010	2	Mission Bell
"Flower"	2011	16	Mission Bell
"The Man Who Wants You"	2013	21	Mountains of Sorrow, Rivers of Song
"Chill In the Air"	2013	—	Mountains of Sorrow, Rivers of Song
"Vaporize"	2016	14	Spirit
"No More Darkness, No More Light"	2018	14	My New Moon
"Little Light"	2018	31	My New Moon
"Dying White Light"	2018	—	My New Moon
"Crooked"	2018	—	My New Moon
"Holiday Song"	2019	—	Non-album single
"Worry No More"	2021	6	Dreamland
"Beeline"	2022	—	Dreamland (Deluxe Edition)
"Game Show"	2022	—	Dreamland (Deluxe Edition)
"My Funny Valentine (For Oskar and Eli)"	2022	—	My Ideal: A Tribute to Chet Baker Sings
"Greenville"	2023	—	Honeysuckle Switches: The Songs of Lucinda Williams
"Fruits of My Labor"	2023	—	Honeysuckle Switches: The Songs of Lucinda Williams
"Hold on Tight"	2024	—	Transmissions
"Beautiful Day"	2024	—	Transmissions
"—" denotes a recording that did not chart or was not released in that territory.

==== As featured artist ====
Title	Year	Album
"These Bones" (Bailen featuring Amos Lee)	2024	Non-album single

=== Other charted songs ===
Year	Single	Peak positions	Album
Year	Single	US	Album
2012	"Day That I Die" (with Zac Brown Band)^{A}	104	Uncaged

- ^{A}Did not enter the Hot 100 but charted on Bubbling Under Hot 100 Singles.

=== Other appearances ===
Title	Year	Credited artist(s)	Album
"Do You Know"	2014	Pieta Brown (featuring Amos Lee)	Paradise Outlaw
"Never More Than Today"	2024	Pride & Shame (featuring Amos Lee)	Mission to Mars
"—" denotes he wasn't on one song, but an entire album.
