= Transmissivity =

Transmissivity may refer to:

- Transmissivity (hydrology), the rate at which groundwater flows horizontally through an aquifer
- Transmittance, the effectiveness of transmitting radiant energy though a volume

== See also ==
- Transmission (disambiguation)
