= Transmissibility (structural dynamics) =

Transmissibility, in the context of structural dynamics, can be defined as the ratio of the maximum force ($f_{max}$) on the floor as a result of the vibration of a machine to the maximum machine force ($P_0$):

$$TR = \frac{f_{max}}{P_0} = R_d\sqrt{1+(2\zeta\beta)^2}$$

Where $\zeta$ is equal to the damping ratio and $\beta$ is equal to the frequency ratio. $R_d$ is the ratio of the dynamic to static amplitude.
