= Nuri Demirağ Nu D.36 =

Turkish trainer aircraft

Nu D.36
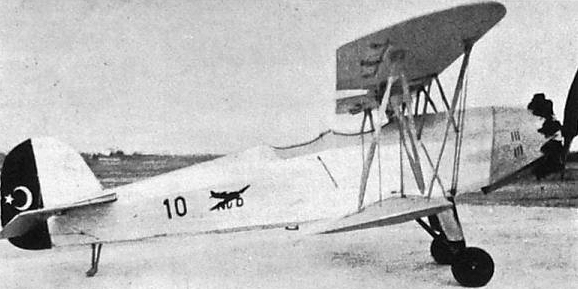
- Nuri Demirag Nu.D.36

General information
- Type: Two-seat training biplane
- National origin: Turkey
- Manufacturer: Nuri Demirağ Aircraft Works

The Nuri Demirağ Nu D.36 was a 1930s Turkish two-seat training biplane built by the Nuri Demirağ Aircraft Works in Istanbul for the Turkish military.

== Design ==
The Nu D.36 is an unequal-span single-bay staggered biplane with a fixed conventional landing gear with a tailskid. It was powered by a 150 hp (112 kW) Walter Gemma I nine-cylinder radial engine. It had two open tandem cockpits for the pilot and trainee.

== Operators ==
Turkey

- Turkish Air Force

== Specifications ==
Data from Jane's Fighting Aircraft of World War II, Jane's all the World's Aircraft 1947

General characteristics

- Crew: 2
- Length: 7.3 m (23 ft 11 in)
- Wingspan: 9.74 m (31 ft 11 in)
- Height: 2.44 m (8 ft 0 in)
- Wing area: 21.8 m^{2} (235 sq ft)
- Empty weight: 650 kg (1,433 lb)
- Max takeoff weight: 1,000 kg (2,205 lb)
- Powerplant: 1 × Walter Gemma I 9-cyl. air-cooled radial piston engine, 110 kW (150 hp)
- Propellers: 2-bladed fixed pitch wooden propeller

Performance

- Maximum speed: 182 km/h (113 mph, 98 kn)with maximum load

<--*Landing speed: 85 km/h (53 mph; 46 kn) (commented out as this does not work in wikitext) -->

- Range: 500 km (310 mi, 270 nmi)
- Endurance: 3 hours 30 minutes
- Service ceiling: 3,350 m (10,990 ft)
- Time to altitude: 500 m (1,600 ft) in 2 minutes; 1,500 m (4,900 ft) in 10 minutes
