= Nuri Demirağ Nu D.38 =

Turkish airliner prototype

Nu.D.38
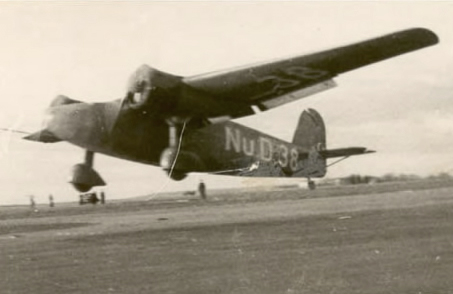

General information
- Type: 4 seat passenger aircraft
- National origin: Turkey
- Manufacturer: Nuri Demirağ
- Number built: 1

History
- First flight: 11 February 1944

The Nuri Demirağ Nu.D.38 was a Turkish light civil transport, with twin engines and seating for four passengers, built in the early 1940s. Only one was constructed and flown.

== Design and development ==
Design work on the Nu.D.38 twin engine light transport began about 1936 and the aircraft was largely completed by 1941, but the first flight was delayed until 1944. Turkey remained neutral through most of World War II, only entering the war in 1945, after the first flight.

The Nu.D.38, manufactured by Nuri Demirağ in Istanbul, was a high cantilever wing aircraft. The wing, of tapered plan and all aluminium alloy stressed skin construction had a built up main spar and a secondary spar. There were pairs of split flaps inboard of the fabric covered ailerons. The fixed surfaces of the tail unit were also aluminium alloy structures with stressed metal skin. The tailplane, set at the top of the fuselage, was strut-braced from below. Control surfaces were fabric covered, with trim tabs.

The fuselage of the Nu.D.38 was an oval cross-section aluminium alloy monocoque, with stressed skin over frames and longitudinal stringers. The crew sat side by side at dual controls in a cabin with side access doors. The passenger compartment seated four, each with their own window, and was accessed through a starboard side door. There was a compartment for luggage or mail in the nose.

The Nu.D.38 was powered by two 160 hp (120 kW) Bramo Sh 14-A4 radial engines, mounted to the main wing spar on steel frames. It had a fixed, conventional undercarriage. A main shock absorber leg was attached to each of the steel engine frames, braced rearwards by a short auxiliary strut. Legs and wheels were enclosed in fairings.

== Operational history ==
The Nu.D.38 was first flown on 11 February 1944. No further aircraft were produced.

== Specifications ==
Data from Jane's All the World's Aircraft

General characteristics

- Crew: 2
- Capacity: 4 passengers
- Length: 8.30 m (27 ft 3 in)
- Wingspan: 13.56 m (44 ft 6 in)
- Height: 2.20 m (7 ft 3 in)
- Wing area: 22.34 m^{2} (240.5 sq ft)
- Empty weight: 1,108 kg (2,443 lb)
- Gross weight: 1,850 kg (4,079 lb)
- Powerplant: 2 × Siemens-Halske (Bramo) Sh 14-A4 7 cylinder radial, 120 kW (160 hp) each
- Propellers: 2-bladed

Performance

- Maximum speed: 271 km/h (168 mph, 146 kn) at sea level
- Cruise speed: 250 km/h (160 mph, 130 kn)
- Service ceiling: 6,650 m (21,820 ft) service
- Rate of climb: 3.40 m/s (669 ft/min) to 4,000m (13,120 ft)

== See also ==
Aircraft of comparable role, configuration, and era

- Beechcraft Model 18
