= Transmission (novel) =

2004 novel by Hami Kunzru

First edition (publ. Hamish Hamilton)

Transmission is a novel written by British-Indian author Hari Kunzru and published in 2004. It primarily follows the narrative of a naïve Indian programmer, Arjun Mehta, who emigrates to the United States in hopes of making his fortune. When he is laid off by his virus-testing company, he sends out e-mails containing a malignant computer virus in a bid to keep his job, unintentionally causing global havoc. Parallel to Arjun's story is that of Guy Swift, the seemingly well-to-do English CEO of an advertising company, and his struggle to keep his business going as the virus spreads.

Transmission was a New York Times Notable Book of the Year in 2005.

== Plot summary ==
Hari Kunzru's novel Transmission is a darkly humorous exploration of the evolving internet landscape between 1990 and 2005. The story follows Arjun Mehta, an Indian computer programmer from Silicon Valley. Arjun believes that moving to America will automatically grant him success and the American Dream. However, upon arriving, he quickly realizes that success is not so easily achieved. Despite his struggles, he assures his family back home that he is doing well.

Arjun's journey begins with a promise of employment from a slick high-tech recruiter. Yet, when he reaches the States, he finds himself stuck in a waiting house for contract employees, which dampens his enthusiasm. Throughout the book, Arjun encounters numerous obstacles that hinder his path to success, with his naivety being a significant barrier.

Kunzru uses several supporting characters to enrich the story through their perspectives. These include Guy Swift, a wealthy and highly successful man who serves as a foil to Arjun; Guy's girlfriend, Gaby; Leila Zahir, a top Bollywood star; and Chris, a co-worker of Arjun's. The author skillfully contrasts Arjun and Guy's experiences without ever having the characters meet.

== Main characters ==
- Arjun Mehta – An IT expert and a fantasist who imagined himself capable of getting a job in America's top leading company through his expertise in computer technology. Coming from a middle-class family with his father making stable amount of money to support a family of four, he still pushes himself to reach for a delusional extravagant life of America. As a computer expert he already had a live perception of what American life looks like, but the truth that he is blind folded to be that tragedies happen in America too, especially to vulnerable immigrants like him who base their life off a Bollywood movie.
- Leela Zahir – A famous actress and dancer is channeled into Bollywood by her mother. Her desperate fans are now joined by global journalists who want to know if she had any connection with the virus infected into computers world-wide. Despite all the attention and glamor she never wants to be noticed and did not enjoy her freedom. Leela sheltered her thoughts by the orders of her mother. It seemed like the innocent dancing sensation of India had something else planned for her after she found out how one of her fans, Arjun Mehta, thinks about her. Arjun Mehta played an immense role in making Leela famous and caused her discomfort by all the attention, but she was able to hear his side of the story which touched her emotionally.
- Gabriella Caro – “Money moved her”, she learned how to adjust to the fast changing environment since the age of sixteen or even earlier. Her parents' separation was not the only event in her life that forced her to become a refugee to UK, but also her previous relationship with a Brazilian photographer, death of her older sister due to an overdose on drugs, and greed for money. Gaby held an interesting part in the Transmission by connecting to other characters such as Leela who in some way uses her advice. An irresistible figure and a strong personality bring her lot of success and even a relationship with a young millionaire entrepreneur, Guy Swift. When he first sees her at the film fund party he had hoped she would be the one who would become the center of his life, or at least would be located at the center of the several intersecting value circles that he visualized as defining his life.
- Guy Swift – Self-centered, young entrepreneur who does a tremendous job in making his company one of the best advertising firms, but has a hard time managing his own personal life. His relation with his girlfriend Gabriella is not very romantic. Their love life has constant ups and downs throughout the book. Guy Swift is shook back into reality once his business is on the verge of sinking. It's caused by a virus inflected by Arjun. In an attempt not to lose his girlfriend, he tries to express his affection to Gabriella, but she has long lost sincerity and respect for him. Guy Swift is a hard worker and likes to enjoy his wealth, but the happiness doesn't last too long for him.

== Themes ==
=== Globalization and technology ===
Transmission deals with how technology, namely computers and the Internet, are rapidly shrinking the world, and addresses both the positive and negative ramifications of this change. The easy transmission of information allows people like Arjun to be virtually self-taught in programming, but the easy transmission of people allows him to be shipped to America as cheap labour and his skills to be exploited. In an interview, Kunzru summarized the dual nature of globalization as presented in his novel, stating that “barriers are broken and people are coming to understand each other better” but “people like [Arjun] pay a big price”. Increasing interconnectedness also provides a means for small problems, like one person losing his job, to affect information across the world. The diversity of the main characters' origins, occupations, social statuses, etc. emphasises the breadth of technology's scope. Arjun, a poor virus tester; Guy Swift, an opulent advertising CEO; Gabriella, a shallow token girlfriend; and Leela, an Indian film star, are all affected by the same virus despite their wildly differing circumstances.

=== Neocolonialism ===
Kunzru's portrayal of an intelligent, skilled young man separated from his family and culture to be essentially sold into corporate slavery in the West implies “a different, but equally lethal, type of empire, that of powerful transnational corporations”. Throughout the novel, Western and/or formerly colonial powers continually have the upper hand over minority characters, not only in the case of the Indian immigrants like Arjun who are taken advantage of by the corporation Databodies, but in the mass deportation plan that Guy encounters in Belgium. Although colonialism as a formal system has ended, three people can still forcefully dislocate millions of foreign immigrants as effectively as if colonialism were still intact. Symbolically alluding to its continuing influence in contemporary society is the bust of Leopold II present as Guy outlines his advertising campaign about "seamless networking and open borders". By juxtaposing neocolonialism and Guy's ideals of an open-bordered global community, Kunzru suggests that, in spite of its benefits, there is a side to globalization that can be compared to the colonialism of the past.

== Critical reception ==
- ""Mummy, I'm going to America!" Arjun announces early in this deft comedy of global manners and cyber pranks. He might as well have said prison, or be trampled by horses." – Janet Maslin, The New York Times
- "Transmission has one very good one, Arjun Mehta, a shy young programmer who grows up in stultifying middle-class India and dreams of emigrating to racy America. Anyone who watched the news last night will instantly understand the humor here and feel for poor Arjun from the beginning." – Walter Kim (The New York Times)
- "Is Transmission, Hari Kunzru's second novel, geek lit? Or is it a subtle, often humorous, analysis of the infantilism that, everywhere, defines the culture we live in? Certainly, its protagonist is a geek. Arjun Mehta, who grew up in the suburbs of New Delhi, is a talented if slightly dysfunctional young man who seems to his parents and sister to be going nowhere, until he appears for an interview with a suave Indian representative of a Californian computer firm, and finds himself with a passport and a visa to America." - Amit Chaudhuri (The Guardian)
