= Transmissions (Amos Lee album) =

Studio album by Amos Lee
- Released: August 9, 2024
- Length: 51:02
- Labels: Hoagiemouth Records; Thirty Tigers
- Producer: Amos Lee

Amos Lee chronology
Honeysuckle Switches: The Songs of Lucinda Williams (2023)	Transmissions (2024)

Transmissions is the eleventh studio album by the American singer-songwriter Amos Lee. It was released on August 9, 2024, under Lee's own imprint Hoagiemouth Records with distribution handled by Thirty Tigers.

== Background and promotion ==
Transmissions was announced by Lee on March 14, 2024 alongside a tour in promotion of it for summer 2024; it is his first album of original material since Dreamland (2022). The album was produced by Lee himself and recorded it live with his band within a timeframe of a week in Upstate New York.

The lead single from the album, "Hold On Tight", was released on April 24, 2024. The second single, "Beautiful Day", was released on May 29, 2024. The third and final single, "Darkest Places", was released on July 10, 2024.

== Critical reception ==
Avery Gregurich of No Depression wrote in her review of Transmissions that it was "an album of personal retrospection in a culture flowing at hyperspeed" that was "about middle life, love, and yielding to the moment that you are in with grace and humility." Writing for American Songwriter, Hal Horowitz rated the album three-and-a-half out of five "notes" and described it as "reflective, often hushed and musically stripped-down". He concluded his review by writing that it was "heartfelt" and "sincere" while comparing it to Lee's previous efforts, while also remarking that the album "[nudged] lyrical and occasionally vocal boundaries with [Lee's] refined, moving approach."

== Track listing ==
All tracks are written by Amos Lee.

Transmissions track listing
No.	Title	Length
1.	"Built to Fall"	5:40
2.	"Beautiful Day"	5:10
3.	"Carry You On"	3:29
4.	"Hold On Tight"	3:13
5.	"Madison"	3:42
6.	"Darkest Places"	4:28
7.	"Keep on Movin"	4:25
8.	"Night Light"	3:47
9.	"Lucky Ones"	5:05
10.	"When You Go"	3:21
11.	"Baby Pictures"	4:55
Total length:		51:02

== Personnel ==
Credits for Transmissions adapted from Tidal.

=== Musicians ===
- Amos Lee - vocals, keyboards, electric guitar, acoustic guitar
- Zach Djanikan - banjo, bass, electric guitar, mandolin, piano, saxophone, background vocals
- Jaron Ovlesky - bass, keyboards, organ, percussion, piano, synthesizer, background vocals
- Rob Moose - cello, viola, violin
- Lee Falco - drums, percussion, background vocals
- Connor Kennedy - electric guitar
- Mikaela Davis - harp
- Greg Leisz - lap steel guitar, pedal steel guitar

=== Technical ===
- Amos Lee - production, back cover photo
- Gillian Pelkonen - assistant engineer
- Will Burger - assistant engineer
- Denise Guerin - cover photo
- Pete Hanlon - engineer
- Adam Ayan - mastering
- Tchad Blake - mixing
- Anthony Mulcahy - photography
