= Transmission (magazine) =

Transmission was a literary magazine in the United Kingdom. A non-profit publication, it written and produced by volunteers. It was published three times a year, and ceased publication in 2008.

== History ==
Transmission was founded in 2004 by Dan McTiernan and Graham Foster, originality as a student project. Printed in Manchester, it was originally chiefly concerned with finding and championing unpublished authors from the North of England. However, as the magazine grew in popularity it began to accept submissions from all over the UK—although still with a focus on Manchester.

The magazine featured short stories and interviews with a literary figures. In a regular section, entitled "Writer's Block", literary professionals offered writing guidance. Notable contributors to this section include novelists, such as Paul Magrs, Ian McGuire and Ray Robinson, and publishers, such as Comma Press's Ra Page and Carcanet's Michael Schmidt.

The short stories published in each issue were based around a theme (e.g. "Identity", "Nature" and "Time"). Each issue also included a "Micro-Fiction" section, consisting of short stories under 500 words. Every story was illustrated by up-and-coming illustrators, providing the magazine with a unique identity.

== Reception ==
City Life called Transmission "A well-judged balance of fiction, interviews and articles - reading it feels like it might do you a favour, not the other way round." Time Out thought it was "touching" "entertaining" and "pull[ed] off one of the hardest tricks in fiction...".

In 2006, the magazine won the Incwriters Magazine Award for outstanding contribution to literature.
