= Nuri Demirağ =

Turkish industrialist

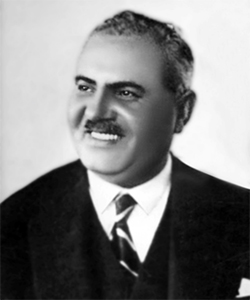
- Born: 1886; Divriği, Sivas Vilayet, Ottoman Empire
- Died: 13 November 1957 (aged 71); Istanbul, Turkey
- Occupation: Industrialist
- Relatives: Banu Onaral (granddaughter)

Nuri Demirağ (1886 in Divriği – November 13, 1957, in Istanbul) was an early Turkish industrialist and politician, who was one of the first millionaires of the Turkish Republic.

== Biography ==
His first enterprise was a cigarette paper factory which commenced production in 1922. Starting from the late 1920s, Demirağ began to invest his capital in the development of the Turkish railway network. Because of this investment, Mustafa Kemal Atatürk gave him the surname Demirağ (meaning "Iron web") when the Surname Law was put into effect in 1934.

In 1936 he established an aircraft factory employing 500 people in Beşiktaş, Istanbul (later nationalized by the government and now occupied by the Istanbul Naval Museum). The production of the Nu D.36 two-seat trainer biplane, and Nu D.38 twin-engine high-wing light transport plane took place in this factory.

In 1945 he founded the first opposition party, which was named Milli Kalkınma Partisi (National Development Party), but his party failed to receive the required number of votes for entering the Turkish parliament in the 1946 and 1950 general elections, and was eventually dissolved in 1958, a year after his death. In 1954, he was elected as a member of parliament for Sivas on behalf of the Democratic Party, which won the general elections.

Demirağ donated his airplanes to his flying school (Gök Okulu) in Yeşilköy, which he established for attracting the interest of Turkish youth in aviation. The land upon which the school was built was later nationalized by the Turkish government in order to enlarge the neighbouring Yeşilköy Airport (Atatürk International Airport) which was originally established as a military air base of the Ottoman Air Force in 1911.

Demirağ died in 1957 from diabetes.
