= Mutlu Onaral =

American singer (born 1979)

- Origin: Philadelphia, Pennsylvania
- Genres: Soul; Reggae; R&B
- Instrument(s): Vocals, Guitar
- Years active: 2003–present
- Labels: Manhattan Records

Mutlu Onaral (born May 16, 1979) is an American Soul singer from Philadelphia. A first generation American of Turkish ancestry, Onaral released a five-song EP in 2004, and has served as the guitarist for Amos Lee at live shows, also providing vocal work. He released his debut album, Livin' It, on Manhattan Records in 2008, with the Philadelphia Daily News giving it an A−. The album was produced by Tom Wolk, who also provided backing vocals on two of the songs.
