= Anti-Kemalism =

Opposition to Kemalism

Anti-Kemalism or opposition to Kemalism refers to the rejection of Kemalism, an ideology associated with Turkish nationalism and based on the principles of Mustafa Kemal Atatürk, as well as opposition to efforts to promote Kemalist ideas. Some critics reject Kemalism because of its principle of secularism, while others regard it as a bourgeois ideology. Others oppose it because they consider it excessively nationalist or argue that it has involved policies of cultural assimilation directed at ethnic groups in Turkey. The one-party period during which Kemalism was implemented has also been criticised by some anti-Kemalists as authoritarian and restrictive, as placing pressure on religious belief, or as promoting social conformity and a political elite detached from the public. The period after 1980 saw the development of civil society alongside more sustained public discussion of anti-Kemalism.

== Criticism of Kemalism ==
=== One-party system ===
Some anti-Kemalists describe the period of one-party rule by the Republican People's Party (CHP) as a period of dictatorship. According to this view, although the Kemalist Republic claimed to have transferred sovereignty to the people, political power was in practice concentrated in the hands of the people leading the CHP. The fact that the CHP was the only legal governing party, and that it determined the direction of public affairs without party competition, is cited by these critics as evidence that sovereignty did not rest with the people. In the 1930s, Turkey was described as Europe's fourth single-party dictatorship in terms of its ranking among such regimes.

=== Lack of democracy ===
Kemalism's one-party approach has been criticised by anti-Kemalists. According to historian Cemil Koçak, who has criticised Kemalism, the regime did not genuinely aim to establish a multiparty system, and the two attempts to introduce multiparty politics were merely nominal. Although the Free Republican Party was dissolved by its founder, Fethi Okyar, after three months, no further attempt was made to establish a multiparty system through another party. A transition to multiparty politics took place only 16 years later, which some critics attribute to pressure from Western states.

=== Social uniformity ===
Some critics argue that during the one-party period under the CHP, the state sought to produce a uniform type of citizen. In this view, the Kemalist regime intervened in many aspects of public life and used state power to prescribe how people should live. Second Republican thinkers regarded Kemalism as an ideology opposed to individual freedoms.

=== Lack of popular support and despotism ===
One criticism of Kemalism is that the Kemalist reforms were not based on popular support and were imposed from above through state pressure. İdris Küçükömer argued that the one-party period under the CHP had a despotic character. According to Küçükömer, the CHP failed to create civil society and even obstructed its development. Another line of criticism concerned constitutional amendments made during the one-party period, which were described as arbitrary, and laws such as the Penal Code and Civil Code, which some critics argued were not rooted in Turkish culture because they were based on the laws of other countries. Cemil Koçak has also argued that the republican slogan of "national sovereignty" (hâkimiyet-i millîye) remained only on paper.

=== Failure to achieve economic development ===
İdris Küçükömer argued that Turkey had failed to achieve economic development during the one-party Kemalist period. He maintained that from 1923 to 1933 the state experimented with a more liberal and capitalist approach to economic development, but turned to statism under the CHP after those experiments had failed. Küçükömer also criticised what he described as inconsistent, trial-and-error economic policies and characterised the approach as the "creation of capitalists by the state".

=== Nationalism and assimilation ===
Some anti-Kemalists oppose Kemalism on the grounds that it imposed policies of forced Turkification and assimilation on ethnic minorities living in Turkey, including Kurds. They criticise what they describe as Kemalism's homogenising conception of a single nation and regard it as a form of cultural assimilation. Several groups have also criticised Kemalism for what they characterise as an assimilationist form of nationalism.

=== Restrictions on religious belief and practice ===
Some anti-Kemalists have criticised the one-party Kemalist period for restricting the role of religion in public life in favour of secularism. They have cited a series of measures as excluding religious life, symbols and ideas from public affairs: the separation of religion and politics through the Law on High Treason; the abolition of the caliphate; the abolition of Sharia courts; the enactment of the Law on the Unification of Education; the closure of Sufi lodges, zawiyas and türbes; the removal of the provision establishing Islam as the state religion from the Constitution; and the requirement that the call to prayer be recited in Turkish. Critics argue that although the principle of secularism is intended to separate religious and state affairs, the Kemalist state determined how religion could be practised and, according to some critics, restricted religious practice. They contend that state interference in religion undermined the separation of religion and state that secularism is supposed to guarantee. Some have also argued that the alphabet reform severed cultural links with the past, while the abolition of the caliphate weakened religious ties with other countries in the Muslim world. Some religious critics of Kemalism view the republican period as a period of trauma and victimisation for their communities. The feelings they express towards Kemalism and its principal figure, Atatürk, have consequently been characterised by some writers as resentment, anger and rancour.

=== Lack of press freedom under the one-party CHP period ===
Some anti-Kemalists argue that newspapers during the one-party period under the Kemalist Republican People's Party did not have sufficient freedom to criticise the government. According to this view, most newspapers supported the CHP, the sole governing party, and were expected to do so. During the period in which the Free Republican Party was founded and dissolved after three months, it was quickly targeted by the pro-CHP press. Cemil Koçak described this situation by writing that "the government press had condemned the supporters of the Free Republican Party from the very beginning". The press controlled by the CHP did not welcome the new party; critics argue that the limits of the opposition it could offer were set by the government through the press from the outset, before the party was dissolved following the violent İzmir rally.

During the one-party period, newspapers that supported the two opposition parties established during attempts to introduce a multiparty system received severe penalties. The newspapers Vatan, Tanin, Tevhid-i Efkar and Adana Tokgöz were penalised for supporting the Progressive Republican Party, while Son Telgraf and Yeni Sabah were penalised for supporting the Free Republican Party. These penalties have been criticised as incompatible with democratic principles.

=== Kemalist historiography ===
Some anti-Kemalists criticise Kemalist interpretations of history and what they regard as the official historiography of the republic. Those who describe the one-party CHP period as a dictatorship reject historical accounts that portray Mustafa Kemal Atatürk as having sought a multiparty system and democracy. Another criticism is the claim that the Turkish War of Independence was not anti-imperialist. Murat Belge and İdris Küçükömer have argued that the War of Independence was not an anti-imperialist struggle but only a war between Turks and Greeks. Anti-Kemalist writer Kadir Mısıroğlu argued that Kemalist historiography began Turkish history with Atatürk and the Republic of Turkey, thereby denying the country's earlier history.

=== Party affiliation of the president ===
During the 27-year one-party Kemalist regime, the president was affiliated with the ruling party and, according to anti-Kemalist critics, was not politically impartial. Both Mustafa Kemal Atatürk and İsmet İnönü served as presidents while also leading the Republican People's Party. This arrangement has been criticised by some anti-Kemalists. When the Free Republican Party was established as part of an attempt to introduce a multiparty system, people close to the party called on Mustafa Kemal Pasha to remain neutral and leave the CHP. He did not leave the party while serving as president. The Progressive Republican Party, the first opposition party, also opposed the president's party affiliation and advocated a non-partisan presidency.

=== Prohibition of International Workers' Day on 1 May ===
In 1921, demonstrations marking International Workers' Day took place in Turkey despite prohibitions imposed by the occupying forces during the Occupation of Istanbul. Before the proclamation of the republic, the İzmir Economic Congress had called for 1 May to be recognised as a holiday for workers, alongside proposals concerning workers' representation and the recognition of the rights to strike and organise trade unions. May Day was celebrated openly in Turkey in years such as 1922 and 1923, but later faced restrictions and prohibitions. After the passage of the Law on the Maintenance of Order in 1925, rights relating to trade unions, strikes and public celebrations were suspended, with effects that continued in subsequent years. In 1935, the holiday was renamed the "Spring Festival" and declared a public holiday.

Cemil Koçak has drawn attention to the absence of workers' demands from the "Nine Principles Declaration", published on 8 April 1923. He argued that May Day had been celebrated freely even during the late Ottoman Empire, and criticised its prohibition during the one-party CHP governments of Atatürk and İnönü. Koçak also noted that British and French forces had permitted May Day celebrations in occupied Istanbul in 1921, during the Turkish War of Independence, and contrasted this with the inability to celebrate the holiday under the one-party CHP government.

== Notable anti-Kemalists ==
The following individuals have been described in the cited sources as critics or opponents of Kemalism:

- Abdurrahman Dilipak
- Ahmet Altan
- Ali Bulaç
- Atilla Yayla
- Ayşe Hür
- Bülent Uluer
- Celadet Ali Bedir Khan
- Cemalettin Kaplan
- Cemil Koçak
- Etyen Mahçupyan
- Fethullah Gülen
- Fikret Başkaya
- İbrahim Kaypakkaya
- İdris Küçükömer
- Kadir Mısıroğlu
- Mehmet Altan
- Metin Kaplan
- Murat Belge
- Mustafa Armağan
- Mümtaz'er Türköne
- Nazlı Ilıcak
- Nihal Atsız
- Rıza Nur
- Roni Margulies
- Selahattin Demirtaş
- Sevan Nişanyan
- Şahin Alpay
- Şevki Yılmaz
- Taner Akçam
- Yavuz Bahadıroğlu
- Osman Yüksel Serdengeçti
- Yusuf Kaplan
- Yusuf Tekin
