= Birikim =

Political magazine in Turkey

- Categories: Political magazine; Cultural magazine
- Frequency: Monthly (until 2005)
- Publisher: Birikim Publishers
- Founder: Ömer Laçiner; Murat Belge
- Founded: 1975
- First issue: 1 March 1975
- Final issue: 2005 (print)
- Country: Turkey
- Based in: Ankara; Istanbul
- Language: Turkish
- Website: birikimdergisi.com
- ISSN: 2687-5292
- OCLC: 32887791

Birikim (Turkish: Accumulation) is a leftist magazine which has existed since 1975 in Turkey. It was banned by the military authorities in 1980 immediately after the coup. The magazine resumed its publication in 1989. It was a print magazine under the subtitle Aylık sosyalist kültür dergisi (Turkish: Monthly socialist cultural journal) until 2005 when it was redesigned as an online publication.

== History and profile ==
Birikim was started by a group of Turkish Marxists, including Ömer Laçiner and Murat Belge, in 1975, and its first issue appeared on 1 March that year. The magazine was initially headquartered in Ankara. Its publisher is Birikim Publications which also produces other titles, including Toplum and Bilim (Turkish: Society and Science).

One of the goals set for Birikim was to redefine socialism based on a critical approach towards Kemalism. Therefore, it managed to develop its own approach without being part of any fractions within the Marxism in Turkey. Unlike the Turkish leftist groups in the 1970s the magazine did not support the Maoist paradigms. The magazine frequently featured articles on existentialism between in start in 1975 and 1980.

Birikim was banned immediately after the 1980 military coup in Turkey and was relaunched in 1989. Between 1984 and 1989 when the magazine was not published its contributors led by Murat Belge established Yeni Gündem, a weekly publication. However, the latter was not a full continuation of Birikim.

In its second phase from its restart in March 1989 Birikim writers became closer to neoliberalism which they regarded as a very successful approach not only in economics but also in political arena. This shift was partly a consequence of the dissolution of the Soviet Union.

== Contributors and editors ==
Onat Kutlar was among the regular contributors of Birikim in its first period between 1975 and 1980. Some of the major contributors in the second period have included Tanıl Bora and Ahmet İnsel. In 1993 Birikim published the writings of Slavoj Žižek, a Slovenian philosopher and cultural theorist, in Turkish for the first time.

As of 2005 Ömer Laçiner was serving as its editor-in-chief.
