= Atatürk's Main Principles =

Main views of the founding father of the Republic of Turkey, Atatürk

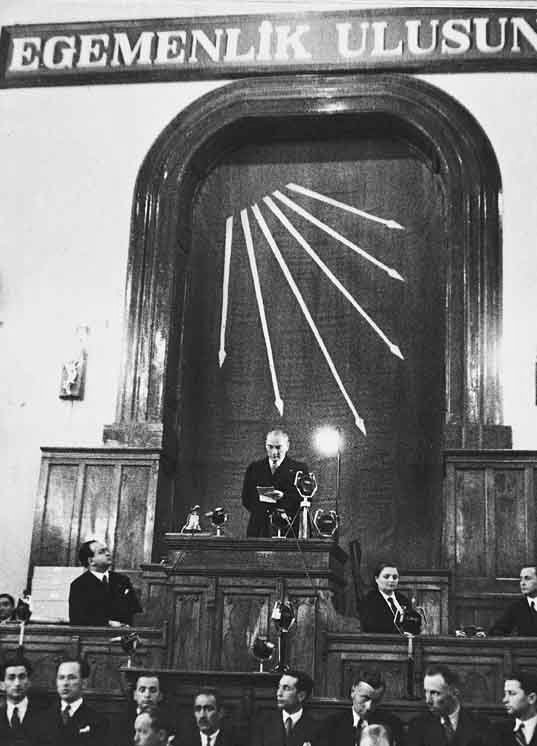
The Six Arrows which represent Atatürk's principles.

Atatürk's Principles consist of six principles that determine the pragmatic policies of Turkey's first president, Mustafa Kemal Atatürk, which he put into effect under his administration. These principles came to be the fundamental pillars of the Republican People's Party, the founding and sole party of the country, on 13 May 1935. Later, the principles were added to the 1924 Constitution with a law enacted in 1937 and thus became the national ideology of Turkey with this practice.

The Six Arrows are widely used as a visual symbol to represent Atatürk's principles. The Republican People's Party continues to use the Six Arrows as its symbol today.

== Basic Principles ==
=== Republicanism ===
Republic: A government in which the sovereignty belongs to the people. A republic is a form of democracy, and it is a regime in which the people have a say in the administration. Republicanism (Turkish: Cumhuriyetçilik), on the other hand, means the presence of the Republic in the state administration. It comes from the word "cumhur", which means people in Arabic.

Atatürk's view on Republicanism: "The administration most suitable for the character and customs of the Turkish nation".

The republican administration has been added to the Turkish constitution since 1923 and is the first article of the constitution. In the second article of the constitution, the characteristics of the republic are stated and are: "Turkey is a democratic, secular and social state of law, respectful of human rights, loyal to Atatürk's nationalism."

Atatürk adopted a democratic republic in Turkey. Regarding this, he said, "The full and most obvious form of democracy is the republic". At the same time, Atatürk entrusted the republic to the Turkish youth and tried to ensure that the country was in constant renewal, industrialization, and modernization.

==== Development of the principles ====
Ali Suavi, Namık Kemal and other Young Ottomans demanded a regime that would limit the sultan's authority, especially with the influence of the American and French revolutions. Especially during the reign of Abdul Hamid II, in which the views of French philosophers spread widely among the Young Turks. Atatürk was also a part of this formation. However, the idea of reform did not go beyond the idea of a constitutional monarchy until Atatürk.

It was especially possible for the idea of a republic to find the opportunity to develop in the period following the First World War. After the war, empires such as Russia, Germany and Austria were replaced by republican regimes. In 1918, Azerbaijan was established as the first Muslim-majority republic. Other Muslim peoples in Russia also declared themselves republics. The idea of a republic thus spread throughout the Middle East and North Africa.

It is not known exactly when Atatürk started to plan the project of establishing a republic. On the other hand, looking at the reports of the nationalist meetings in 1919, it can be said that the independence struggle was influenced by Atatürk's republican ideas from the very beginning. However, due to the strong loyalty to the sultanate and caliphate, Atatürk and those who thought like him had to wait to bring their ideas to life. The republic was proclaimed almost a year after the abolition of the sultanate.

=== Nationalism ===
According to Atatürk, the nation is: A community of people who have lived together in the past, who have the belief and decision to live together in the future, who have the same homeland, and who have a unity of language, culture and emotion. Atatürk's view on nationalism is a patriotist civic nationalism which bases the definition of nation on citizenship and upper identity values, regardless of religion and race.

In the 66th article of the 1982 Constitution, which reflects Atatürk's nationalism, "Everyone who is bound to the Turkish State by citizenship is a Turk." In his book Civil Information for Citizens, Atatürk defined the nation as "The people of Turkey who founded the Turkish Republic are called the Turkish nation."

=== Populism (Folkism) ===
The principle of populism, first of all, is aimed at the realization and establishment of a progressive, Western democracy, which means "the administration of the people, by the people for the people". It also prioritizes national sovereignty. The state aims at the welfare and happiness of the citizens. It envisages the division of labor and solidarity among citizens. It ensures that the nation enjoys equal access to government services. It is understood from Atatürk's populism principle that: No privilege is given to any person, group or any class in society. Everyone is equal before the law. According to the principle of populism, no one can gain superiority over others in terms of religion, race, sect or money when judged before the law.

Populism is defined in the six pillars of the Republican People's Party founded by Mustafa Kemal as follows: "For us, people must be treated equally before the law. No distinction should be made between class, family and individuals. We believe that the people of Turkey are not as a whole made up of various classes, but as a whole; as one. We see Turkish society as having various professions according to the needs of social life." However, this should not be confused with collectivism. The "populism" that Atatürk refers to here is not a socialist ideology used by left-wing countries and is also not incompatible with individualism. Atatürk's populism, as mentioned in the 1935 CHP program and Atatürk's Medeni Bilgiler book, is solidarist based on the solidarity of the classes and also egalitarian.

Necessary measures have been taken for equality between women and men, the end of sex segregation in schools, the measures taken to prepare a new Turkish alphabet that every citizen can learn and to treat every citizen equally before state organs support the principle of populism.

According to Ahmet Taner Kışlalı, Kemalist populism wanted to strengthen the poorest and most uneducated segment of the society and to ensure social solidarity.

==== History ====
During the reign of Sultan Abdulaziz, some Ottoman intellectuals, especially Ali Suavi, were influenced by the Narodnik movement in Russia and began to deal with the problems of the people. At the end of the 19th century, many literary figures, especially Mehmet Emin Yurdakul, were affected by populism. After the Young Turk Revolution, the word 'folk' found wide usage. For a long time, populism was thought of as the act of benevolent intellectuals for the benefit of the masses.

This understanding began to change after World War I. Ziya Gökalp concluded, under the influence of Durkheim, that class conflict was bad, and shortly after the Soviet Revolution in 1918, opposed it and defended populism against it. Gökalp defined populism as follows:

If a society consists of several strata or classes, then it is not an egalitarian society. The aim of populism is to suppress stratification or class differences and instead to create a social structure of professional groups in solidarity with each other. In other words, we can summarize populism as follows: there are no social classes, there are professions!

This approach largely lends itself to solidarism. This understanding greatly influenced nationalists, especially the Kemalists, during the Turkish War of Independence. Although the corporations proposed by Gökalp were not realized, the principle of no classes was accepted by the Kemalist leaders. Kemalist leaders, especially Atatürk, insisted that classes were not yet developed in Turkey. They adopted the idea of solidarity in order to fight communism and the idea of class struggle. They also saw this as the justification for the one-party system.

Although populism is a principle that is quickly adopted, after World War II, it remained largely in the background during the rapid industrialization and capitalistization process.

=== Laicism ===
Laicism means that the state does not discriminate on the basis of beliefs in its relations with its citizens, especially the dominant belief in a society. In other words, it is the principle that advocates the non-reference of any religion in state administration and the impartiality of the state against religions, which aims to base the state order, educational institutions and legal rules on reason and science, not on religion. In addition, it enables the individual to protect his/her freedom of religion by leaving the religious affairs to one's conscience.

According to laicism, religion is part of one's private life and thus the state has no say in religious matters. Laicism is the separation of religion and state.

The stages of laicization in Turkey are as follows:

- Abolition of the Ottoman sultanate (1922)
- Abolition of the Ottoman Caliphate (1924)
- Enactment of the Law of Tevhîd-i Tedrisât (End of sex segregation in school) (1924)
- Closure of dervish lodges, zawiyas and shrines (1925)
- Adoption of the Turkish Civil Code (1926)
- The clause "The religion of the state is Islam." removed from the constitution (1928)
- The adoption of Atatürk's Principles (Six Arrows) into the Constitution (1937)

=== Statism ===
Statism envisages the regulation of the general economic activities of the country, and the entry of the state into areas necessitated by national interests. Atatürk's etatism principle: What is necessary for a contemporary and modern order that Turkish society wants to achieve is the strengthening and nationalization of the economy. The principle of etatism in Turkey is moderate etatism, as Atatürk called it. According to this moderate etatism, although the Kemalist economy supported an eventual transformation into a free market economy based on individualism, the state can take over the places that the free market cannot or does not want to enter, but the state should never get ahead of the individual. As Atatürk said, this moderate etatism should not be confused with socialist statism, because it is not in a collectivist structure like socialist statism. The fact that Atatürk also supports foreign funding into the economy, makes the Kemalist economic model equivalent to the social liberal economy. He said the following:

"State can't take the place of individuals, but, it must take into consideration the individuals to make them improve and develop theirselves. Etatism includes the work that individuals won't do because they can't make profit or the work which are necessary for national interests. Just as it is the duty of the state to protect the freedom and independence of the country and to regulate internal affairs, the state must take care of the education and health of its citizens. The state must take care of the roads, railways, telegraphs, telephones, animals of the country, all kinds of vehicles and the general wealth of the nation to protect the peace and security of the country. During the administration and protection of the country, the things we just counted are more important than cannons, rifles and all kinds of weapons. (...) Private interests are generally the opposite of the general interests. Also, private interests are based on rivalries. But, you can't create a stable economy only with this. People who think like that are delusional and they will be a failure. (...) And, work of an individual must stay as the main basis of economic growth. Not preventing an individual's work and not obstructing the individual's freedom and enterprise with the state's own activities is the main basis of the principle of democracy."

Atatürk, who advocates that the state fulfills social justice with social aids, mentions that he has adopted the social state model as follows:

"Democracy leaves the citizen the freedom and opportunity to realize his life and fulfill all kinds of individual and social duties. However, on the other hand, it has to provide a life for some citizens, such as the sick, the weak, the disabled, who cannot fully enjoy their freedoms. Social assistance sees such tasks. (...) An institution established for social welfare is necessary. This institution is very developed everywhere. This service is sometimes managed by the state, and sometimes left to local governments. The second form is the most common. This institution provides doctors and medicines free of charge to those in need. It helps poor elderly, disabled and incurable patients, postpartum women, large families, and children in need.

The official social assistance institution cannot meet the need. Private institutions in the same position, such as the Red Crescent, child protection, charity associations for the poor, also help. The opening of hospitals by the state and the acceptance of some of them free of charge by the decision of the local government are among the services provided by the social aid institution. In addition, civil servants and servants also must have social institutions, such as workers' and peasants' pension funds and insurance boxes for accident and death. In many states, "social insurance" is applied to everyone against conditions such as old age, unemployment and death."

Atatürk stated the purpose of this principle as: "In summary, while keeping the etatism, individual labor and work that we follow as the basis, it is to keep the state personally concerned, especially in the economic field, in the affairs required by the general and high interests of the nation, in order to bring the nation to wealth and the country to public works in as little time as possible."

=== Reformism ===
Reformism is the adoption, development and protection of Atatürk's reforms made for the modernization of the Turkish nation.

This principle is a Turkish nationalist understanding of revolutionism that clearly denies elitism and attaches great importance to integrating with the people and thus democratic methods. There are two sides to the Kemalist Reformist approach. The first aspect is about destroying the outdated institutions of the old order and replacing them with institutions that will meet the needs of the age. But Kemalism is not satisfied with this, it also constantly describes reformism as openness to innovations and changes and opposes stereotypes.

Atatürk regarded the protection of what his reforms brought to the country as a necessity of the reformist principle. But for him, the problem did not end there. He was aware that the conditions would change, that changing conditions would require new institutions and new breakthroughs. For this reason, he was against the stereotypes of Kemalism and, in a sense, the freezing of reforms. He knew that in line with the circumstances, not only institutions but also ideas had to change. This is why Kemalism's Reformist principle also reflects a "Permanent revolution|Permanent Revolutionary" understanding. Even the most progressive institutions wear out in the circumstances. Those who are content with the watchdog of a most advanced revolution cannot escape from being behind the changing conditions and becoming conservative one day. This is the main reason for Kemalism's understanding of permanent revolution.

== Integrative principles ==
=== National independence ===
One of Atatürk's main goals was not being under the control of other powers, and being able to act in the communities formed together with other states as required by Turkey's national interests. For Atatürk, full independence should be realized in "political, financial, economic, judicial, military, cultural and other matters".

=== National unity ===
The principle of National Unity and Togetherness is a necessary result of Atatürk's nationalism. According to this view and understanding, the people, together with its country, is an indivisible whole.

Atatürk had not started the Turkish War of Independence before the Turkish people had become a whole. However, after suppressing the divisive and damaging currents and uprisings, the paths of success were opened to him. In his speeches, Atatürk stated that both victory and revolution took place with national unity. He has never considered the homeland separate from the people.

=== Modernity ===
Modernity, in terms of political science, is defined as the political and social changes accompanying industrialization.

Atatürk defines civilization as the result of a nation's progress in state life, intellectual life and economic life. The Turkish modernization initiated under the leadership of Atatürk is not caused by any external pressure. The basis of Kemalist modernization is full independence as a state, sovereignty as a nation, and rights and freedoms as individuals. The principle of modernization is a necessary result of the understanding of National Sovereignty and Populism.

=== Rationalism ===
Atatürk said, "As a spiritual heritage, I do not leave any verse, any dogma, or any stereotyped rule. My spiritual heritage is science and reason." In his words, he clearly reveals the importance he gives to science and reason.

The adoption of Law No. 2252 on May 31, 1933, which included higher schools, was an important step in the development of science in Turkey in the first years of the Republic. Pursuant to this law, the old Istanbul University was closed on 31 June 1933, and a modern university in line with the western European model was planned to be opened on 1 August 1933 instead. This university was followed by the opening or modernization of many new schools or departments in Turkey. For example, Department of Architecture in Istanbul Technical School, Agriculture and Veterinary School in Ankara, State Conservatory and some other schools can be counted.

The university revolution carried out by Atatürk primarily envisaged that universities in the fields of natural sciences and humanities should keep up with the research traditions in line with western examples. In the fields of history and language, Atatürk strongly supported this movement, which he wanted to revive, by establishing the History and Language Institutions.

=== National sovereignty ===
National sovereignty: The sovereignty, which is the supreme power that establishes and manages the state, belongs directly to the people, not to individuals or certain groups.

On the first day the Turkish Grand National Assembly began to convene, Atatürk stated that all power is in the people's hands. According to him, the people of the nation have the power to fulfill any request. There is no force that can prevent the will of the people.

== See also ==
- The Six Arrows
- Three Principles of the People
- Pancasila
- Republican People's Party
- Sovereignty unconditionally belongs to the People
- How happy is the one who says I am a Turk
