= İdris Küçükömer =

Turkish academic, economist and philosopher (1925–1987)

- Born: 1 June 1925; Giresun, Turkey
- Died: 5 July 1987 (aged 62); Istanbul, Turkey
- Resting place: Büyükada, Istanbul
- Known for: Criticisms regarding Kemalism
- Spouse: Meral Küçükömer

Academic background
- Education: Istanbul University
- Thesis: Modern Kapital Teorilerinde Münakaşalı Bazı Problemler (English: Contentious Issues in Contemporary Theories of Capital) (1955)

Academic work
- Discipline: Economics
- Institutions: Istanbul University

İdris Küçükömer (1 June 1925 – 5 July 1987) was a Turkish academic, philosopher and economist whose views has been influential in Turkish politics. He developed an alternative interpretation of Kemalism from the mid-1960s to his death.

== Early life and education ==
Küçükömer was born in Giresun on 1 June 1925. He hailed from a middle-class labor family. His father died in 1934. He graduated from Trabzon High School. In 1951, he obtained a bachelor's degree in economics from Istanbul University where he also received a PhD in 1955. His PhD thesis was entitled "Modern Kapital Teorilerinde Münakaşalı Bazı Problemler" ("Contentious Issues in Contemporary Theories of Capital").

He served in the Turkish army for twenty-two months in the period 1946–1947 in Gelibolu.

== Career ==
Following his graduation Küçükömer joined his alma mater, Istanbul University, as a faculty member. In 1958, he became an associate professor in the same institution following the completion of his thesis which dealt with economic wealth, social preferences and planning of them. From 1958 to 1960, he was in the United Kingdom for further studies.

Küçükömer began to publish articles in Yön magazine shortly after its launch in 1961 and also, joined the Workers' Party of Turkey becoming a member of its scientific/academic committee. Küçükömer was involved in the establishment of the Socialist Culture Society (Turkish: Sosyalist Kültür Derneği) in 1963.

In 1976, Küçükömer became a full professor at Istanbul University. Following the 1980 coup d'état he was fired from the university. In addition to Yön, he was a contributor to several newspapers and magazines, including Milliyet, Akşam and Ant.

In 1983, Küçükömer joined the Social Democracy Party headed by Erdal İnönü and became a regular contributor of the weekly leftist magazine Yeni Gündem.

=== Views and work ===
During his youth Küçükömer was a Marxist socialist revolutionary. At the beginning of the 1960s, he held a Kemalist political stance. He supported a failed military coup led by army officer Talat Aydemir which was very influential on his views in that he changed his political stance opposing Kemalism and supporting the new left policies in line with Gramsci's civil society concept. He maintained that the civil society cannot be improved in Turkey due to Kemalists' centralized state concept and practices. For him, civil society was not encouraged by the state since it would bring pluralization and seriously limit the jurisdiction. This view was also shared by Murat Belge and Ahmet İnsel who all adopted a liberal political stance with a socialist approach.

In the following period, Küçükömer argued that Kemalism is a bureaucratic, elitist, putschist and reactionary ideology that had its roots in the Turkish army and Turkish bureaucratic elites. He further claimed that the Independence War was not anti-imperialist and progressive, but just a war between Turkey and Greece. His another significant argument was that the Republican People's Party was not a leftist or social democratic party, but a right-wing party dominated by Turkish bureaucrats. Küçükömer and his colleague Sencer Divitçioğlu supported the Asiatic mode of production.

Küçükömer is the author of various books of which the most influential one is Batılılaşma ve Düzenin Yabancılaşması (English: Westernization and the Estrangement of the Established Order) published in 1969. In his studies, he argued that Kemalism and leftist movements in Turkey have controversial nature.

== Personal life and death ==
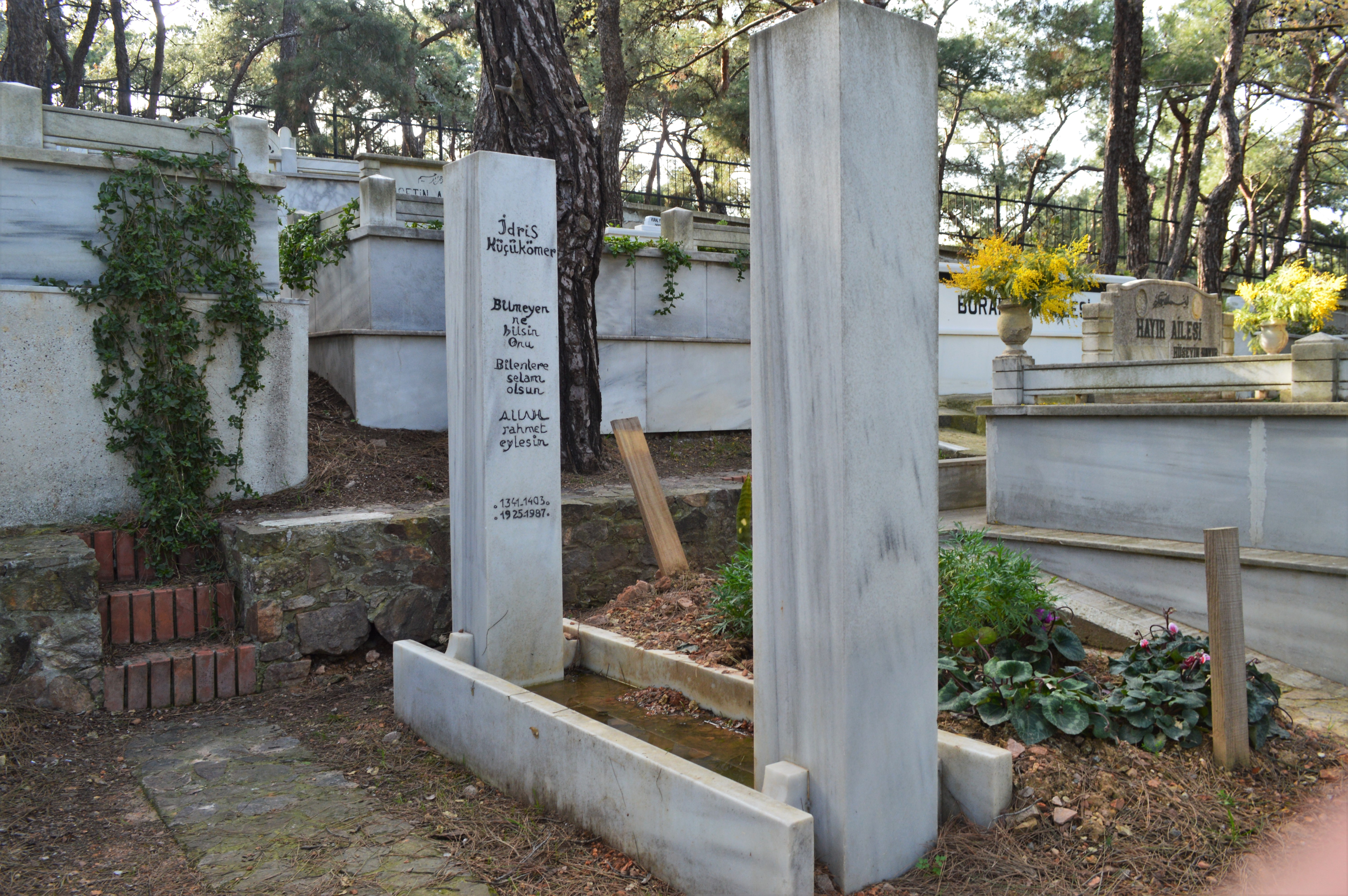
Grave of İdris Küçükömer in Büyükada

Küçükömer's wife was Meral Küçükömer who died in Istanbul in November 2020. They had two sons. During the final years, Idris Küçükömer settled in Büyükada, Istanbul. He died in Istanbul on 5 July 1987 after a long illness and was buried in Büyükada.

Can Yücel, a Turkish poet, dedicated a poem entitled "İdris'in Şu İşi" (English: "This Task of İdris") to Küçükömer after his death.
