= Kurdish involvement in the Iran–Iraq War =

The Kurdish involvement in the Iran–Iraq War was a major part of the conflict. Kurdish political and armed groups participated in the Iran–Iraq War on both sides. During the war, Iran supported Iraqi Kurdish parties such as the Kurdistan Democratic Party (KDP) and the Patriotic Union of Kurdistan (PUK), while Iraq supported Iranian Kurdish parties such as the Democratic Party of Iranian Kurdistan (PDKI) and the Salvation Force.

== Background ==
Kurdish aspirations for autonomy in Iraq were influenced by a series of political and military developments in the decades leading up to the Iran–Iraq War. In the late 1970s, the Iraqi Ba'athist government under Saddam Hussein launched large-scale policies of forced displacement targeting the Kurdish population. These measures included the destruction of an estimated 4,000 villages and the forced relocation of hundreds of thousands of Kurds from their native regions in Iraqi Kurdistan. These policies were part of a broader Arabization campaign aimed at altering the demographic composition of Kurdish-populated regions, further marginalizing Kurdish identity and aspirations for autonomy. This contributed to deepening grievances among the Kurdish population.

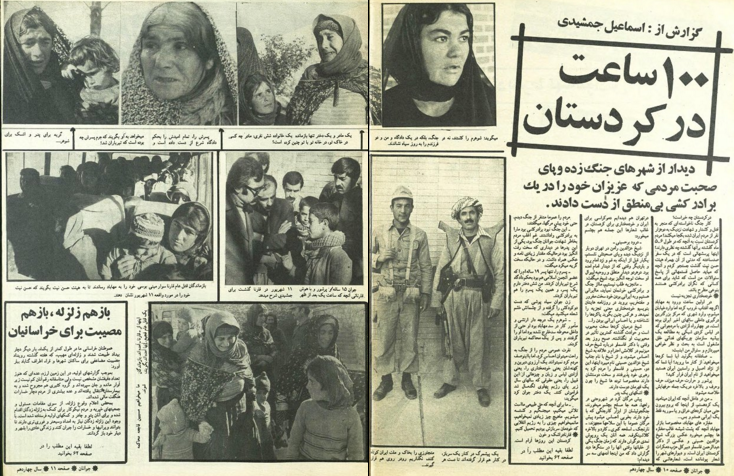
An issue of Javānān-i imrūz (Today's Youth) on December 3, 1979, featuring a photo essay entitled, "One Hour in Kurdistan".

The aftermath of the 1979 Iranian Revolution also influenced Kurdish political dynamics. In Iranian Kurdistan, many Kurds, motivated in part by the Kurdish movement in neighboring Iraq, sought greater autonomy. This led to heightened tensions with the new Islamic Republic and the outbreak of armed conflict in parts of western Iran. The armed conflict between Kurdish groups and the Iranian government from 1979 to 1983, often referred to as the Kurdish rebellion in Iran, resulted in the destruction of numerous towns and villages in Iranian Kurdistan. The clashes led to an estimated 10,000 Kurdish casualties.

During the Iran–Iraq War the situation for Kurdish communities deteriorated further, as both Iran and Iraq conducted military operations in Kurdish-populated areas. In Iraq, government forces carried out widespread campaigns against Kurdish civilians and insurgents. Estimates suggest that between 50,000 and 100,000 Kurds were killed by Iraqi forces during this period, particularly during the Anfal campaign in 1988. The campaign included the use of chemical weapons against both Kurdish guerrilla positions and civilian populations, resulting in thousands of deaths, many of them women and children.

== Emergence of modern Kurdish nationalism ==
Kurdish nationalism emerged prominently in the late 19th and early 20th centuries, largely as a reaction to the disintegration of the Ottoman Empire, within which the Kurds were a significant ethnic group. The movement began with uprisings such as the one led by Sheikh Ubeydullah in 1880, marking the initial expression of Kurdish national aspirations. Throughout the early 20th century, various factors contributed to the consolidation of a collective Kurdish identity, including the rise of nationalisms across the Ottoman Empire.

The Kurdish Democratic Party of Iraq was founded by Mustafa Barzani, often regarded as a key figure in modern Kurdish nationalism, during his time in exile in the Republic of Mahabad, which declared an independent republic in 1946. This period is considered a formative phase in the development of Kurdish nationalism, during which demands for self-rule emerged within the broader political context of the Middle East. The Republic of Mahabad, though short-lived, has been cited as an early example of Kurdish efforts to establish a form of autonomous governance.

During this period, Kurdish nationalism was marked by efforts to achieve autonomy and preserve cultural identity in response to state policies in Iraq and Iran.

== Kurdish factions and political movements ==
During the Iran–Iraq War (1980–1988), Kurdish forces played a significant role, particularly through their alignment with Iran against Saddam Hussein's Ba'athist regime. The Peshmerga, the main Kurdish military force, provided support to Iranian operations in northern Iraq. This cooperation occurred despite a complicated and often strained relationship between Kurdish political leaders and the Iranian government. The alliance was largely driven by a shared opposition to the Iraqi regime and Kurdish aspirations for greater autonomy and recognition of their rights.

With the strengthening of Kurdish national identity, multiple political factions emerged, each promoting different visions of autonomy and self-governance. During the Iran–Iraq War, while most Kurdish groups aligned openly with Iran, some factions also adopted a strategy of limited neutrality. In response to increased Kurdish military activity, the Iraqi government expanded its military operations in the Kurdistan Region. This included the deployment of additional army units and the recruitment of paramilitary forces from certain Kurdish tribes to counter the insurgency.

The Iraqi military strategy aimed to sever Kurdish supply lines to Iran by establishing fortified positions along the Iranian border, underscoring the strategic importance of the region to both sides in the conflict. This dynamic influenced future interactions between Kurdish forces and both Iranian and Iraqi authorities, reflecting the continued struggle for autonomy and the assertion of Kurdish national identity amid broader regional conflicts.

== Kurdish involvement in the war ==
=== Casualties and displacement ===
The Iran–Iraq War had severe consequences for Kurdish communities, resulting in widespread displacement and loss of life. Between 1979 and 1983, an estimated 10,000 Iranian Kurds were killed, and numerous Kurdish towns and villages were destroyed during the fighting.

In Iraq, the regime of Saddam Hussein forcibly displaced hundreds of thousands of Kurds, destroying an estimated 4,000 villages through military campaigns and chemical attacks. These actions were part of a broader campaign aimed at suppressing Kurdish resistance and altering the demographic composition of the region. The widespread destruction had a profound impact on Kurdish communities, disrupting longstanding cultural and social structures.

As a result of these military operations, many Kurds were forcibly relocated, often to southern Iraq or other government-controlled areas, worsening the social and economic disruption in Kurdish regions. Estimates indicate that between 50,000 and 100,000 Kurds were killed by Iraqi forces during the 1988 campaigns alone. Overall casualties during the Iran–Iraq War, including both Iranian and Iraqi populations, are estimated to have reached approximately 500,000.

=== Persecution and human rights violations ===
The Kurdish population endured severe human rights violations during the war, particularly at the hands of the Iraqi government under Saddam Hussein. These abuses, rooted in long-standing anti-Kurdish policies, included systematic repression of Kurdish identity and autonomy, and have been described by various observers as acts of genocide. Iraqi forces employed chemical weapons against Kurdish civilians, most notably in the Halabja chemical attack of 1988, which resulted in thousands of deaths and drew international condemnation. Human rights organizations, such as Amnesty International, have documented numerous violations during this period, including executions, torture, and forced displacement, contributing to widespread reports of repression in Kurdish-populated areas.

The Anfal campaign, carried out by the Iraqi military, involved systematic attacks on Kurdish villages, including mass killings and widespread destruction of homes and infrastructure. The campaign formed part of a broader strategy aimed at suppressing Kurdish nationalism and has had a lasting impact on Kurdish communities in both Iraq and Iran.

Despite the provisions for equality outlined in the Iranian Constitution, Kurds in Iran also faced significant repression during this period, further contributing to the broader human rights concerns affecting Kurdish populations. In the aftermath of the war, the human rights situation for Kurds in both Iraq and Iran remained precarious, with ongoing violations reflecting the legacies of previous abuses and continuing political tensions.

==== Sardasht chemical attack ====
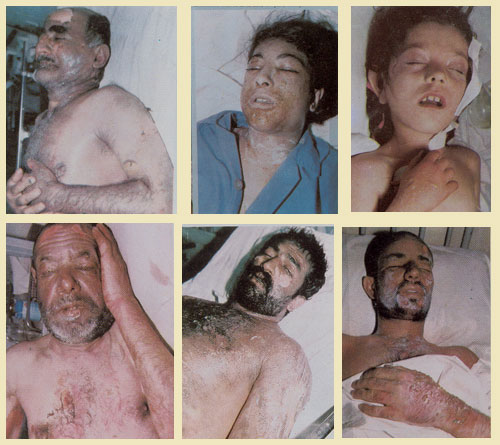
Victims of the attack

On June 28, 1987, during the Iran–Iraq War, Iraqi forces conducted a chemical attack on the Kurdish city of Sardasht in northwestern Iran. The assault involved two separate bombing runs using mustard gas, targeting four residential areas. The attack resulted in 130 fatalities and exposed approximately 8,000 civilians to toxic chemicals. Many survivors suffered long-term health issues, including respiratory problems, eye lesions, skin conditions, and immune system dysfunctions; In 2006, a quarter of the town's 20,000 residents were still experiencing severe illnesses from the attacks. This incident marked the first documented use of chemical weapons against a civilian population since World War I and highlighted the severe humanitarian impact of chemical warfare during the conflict.

==== Halabja chemical attack ====
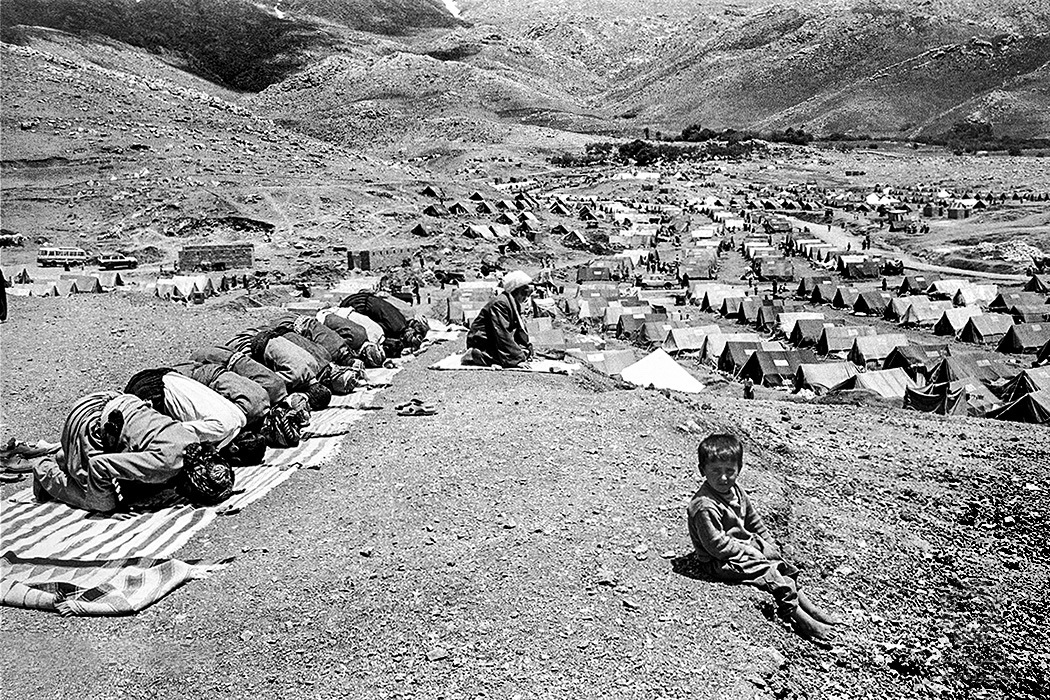
Kurdish refugees from Iraqi Kurdistan, Kermanshah, Iranian Kurdistan 1988.

In the aftermath of the Iran–Iraq War, the Kurdish population in Iraq continued to suffer under state violence. One of the most devastating events occurred on March 16, 1988, in the town of Halabja, where Iraqi forces carried out a large-scale chemical attack against civilians. As part of the broader Anfal Campaign, the attack involved the use of mustard gas and nerve agents such as sarin, tabun, and VX. It is estimated that between 3,200 and 5,000 people were killed, and around 7,000 to 10,000 were injured, many of them women and children. The massacre sent shockwaves throughout the world and has since been regarded as one of the worst chemical weapons attacks in history. It left long-term health and environmental consequences for survivors, and further contributed to the massive displacement and trauma experienced by Kurdish communities during and after the war.

== See also ==
- Kurdish separatism in Iran
- Human rights in Ba'athist Iraq
- International aid to combatants in the Iran–Iraq War
- Kurds in Iraq
- Kurds in Iran
