= Yeni Gündem =

Political magazine in Turkey (1984–1989)

- Editor-in-chief: Murat Belge
- Former editors: Nihat Tuna
- Categories: Political magazine
- Frequency: Weekly
- Publisher: Birikim Publishers
- Founded: 1984
- First issue: 1 May 1984
- Final issue: 1989
- Country: Turkey
- Based in: Istanbul
- Language: Turkish

Yeni Gündem (Turkish: New Agenda) was a weekly political magazine which appeared between 1984 and 1989 in Istanbul, Turkey. It was started by a group of leftist intellectuals, including Murat Belge.

== History and profile ==
Yeni Gündem was established by a group of leftist figures such as Murat Belge in 1984 four years after their publication entitled Birikim was banned by the military government. However, Yeni Gündem was totally different from Birikim which produced theoretical discussions and arguments. Instead, Yeni Gündem was a practice-oriented weekly, but both publications adhered to socialism.

The first issue of Yeni Gündem appeared on 1 May 1984. The magazine was published by Birikim Publications. Its founding editor-in-chief was Nihat Tuna. Murat Belge replaced Tuna as editor-in-chief in 1986 and served in the post until 1989. Its 19 March 1987 issue was confiscated by the Turkish government led by Turgut Özal. Yeni Gündem folded in 1989.

== Content and contributors ==
The focus of Yeni Gündem was on the future rather than the past like other publications which were started in the early 1980s. It covered articles on democratization and opposed to the government's activities. Its content also included articles on feminism, social gender, the Kurdish question, non-Muslim minorities, and homosexuality which were relatively new topics among the leftist groups in Turkey. The Kurdish question was analyzed in depth in the 15–21 March 1987 issue of Yeni Gündem which was one of the first non-official treatments of the topics.

One of the leading contributors of Yeni Gündem was İdris Küçükömer.
