= Mustafa Armağan =

Turkish conspiracy theorist (born 1961)

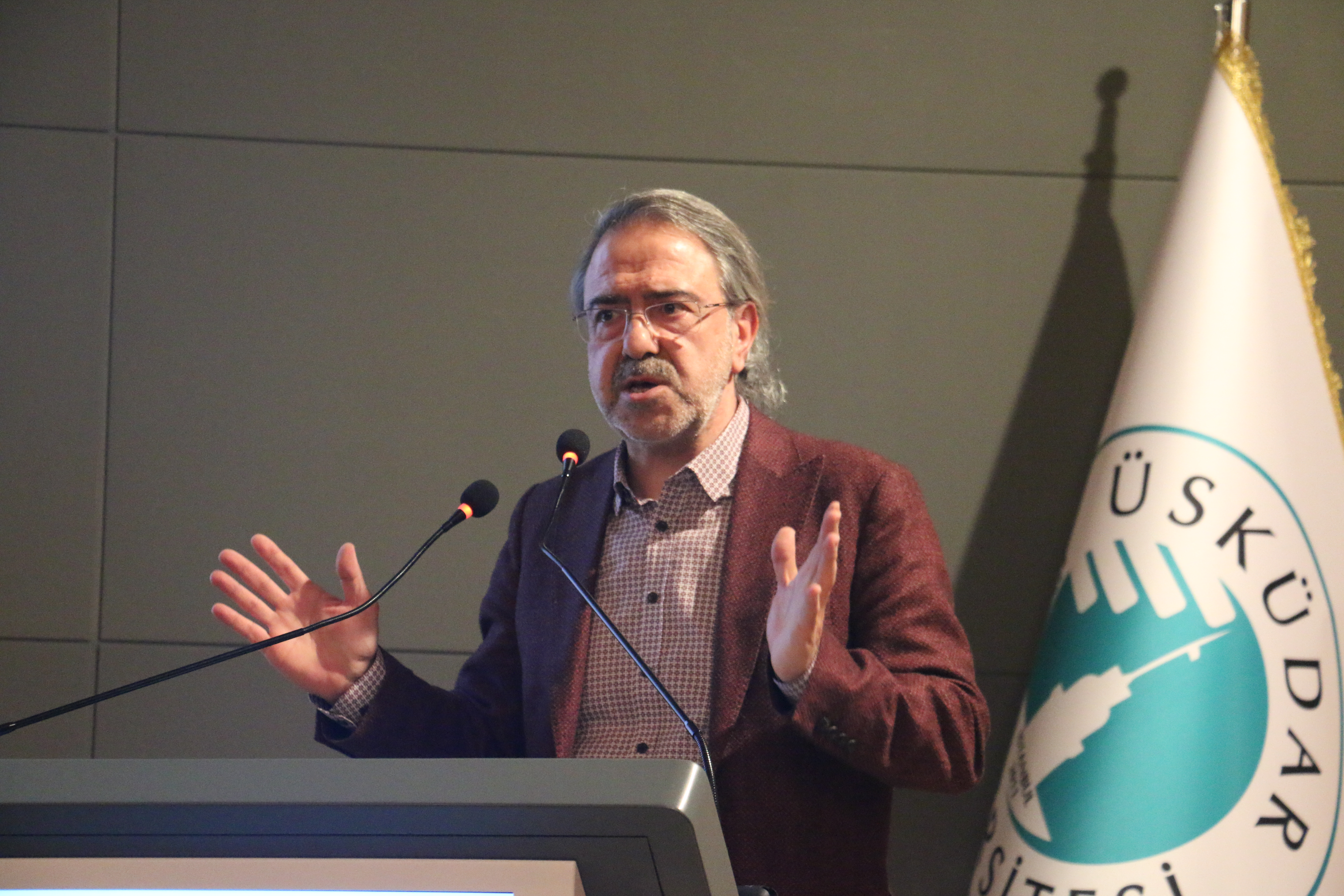
- Mustafa Armağan at Abdulhamid and Youth conference, 2019
- Born: 24 February 1961 (age 65); Cizre, Turkey
- Occupations: Writer, publisher

Mustafa Armağan (born 24 February 1961) is a Turkish Islamist writer and conspiracy theorist. He is known for his historical revisionist publications on the Ottoman Empire and the early years of the Turkish Republic.

== Life ==
He was born in Cizre on February 24, 1961, to parents from Şanlıurfa. He completed his primary and secondary education in Bursa.

After graduating from Istanbul University's Faculty of Letters, Department of Turkish Language and Literature in 1985, Armağan worked as an editor in various publishing houses. He was the editor-in-chief of İzlenim magazine between 1995 and 1996. He was the publication coordinator of the Social Sciences Encyclopedia (Risale Publications, 4 volumes) and the Ottoman Encyclopedia (Ağaç Yayıncılık, 7 volumes). He prepared M. M. Şerif's 4-volume compilation titled History of Islamic Thought (İnsan Yayınları, 1990–91) for publication.

He wrote articles containing historical revisionism in Zaman newspaper from 1995 until October 2015. Between 2000 and 2002, he was the editor of Diyalog Avrasya, which is also known for its closeness to Zaman.

He also prepared and presented the program named Tarih Aynası on Mehtap TV, which is part of the Samanyolu Broadcasting Group.

He was recognised with awards three times by the Writers Union of Turkey. The books for which he was awarded were: Turning Point in Western Thought (in the category of translation from F. Capra, 1989) City, that city (in the essay category, 1997), Ottoman: The Last Island of Humanity (TYB Idea Award). Apart from these, he has published a number of compilations and translations such as Tradition (1992), Between Tradition and Modernity (1995), City Never Forgotten (1996), and Bursa Şehrengizi (1998).

Armağan served as the publishing department manager at the Journalists and Writers Foundation. Together with Ali Ünal, he prepared the book titled Fethullah Gülen in the Media Mirror (From Cocoon to Butterfly) in 1999, published by the Journalists and Writers Foundation. In 2000, he prepared the book Life Dedicated to Dialogue, which compiled the articles written about Fethullah Gülen. This book was also published by the Journalists and Writers Foundation.

He wrote a column every Sunday in Yeni Şafak newspaper between 7 March 2016 and 7 May 2017. He has been writing columns in Yeni Akit newspaper on Thursdays and Sundays since April 18, 2021.

Armağan served as the editor-in-chief of the magazine Derin Tarih between 2012 and 2021. He was tried on the charge of "publicly insulting the memory of Atatürk" and sentenced to 1 year and 3 months in prison for the issue of this magazine published in May 2017, which had the headline "Kemal Pasha is a fake Napoleon" on its cover.
