= Kemalism =

Turkish nationalist political ideology

Kemalism (Turkish: Kemalizm, also archaically Kamâlizm) or Atatürkism (Atatürkçülük) is a syncretic and nationalist political ideology based on the ideas of Mustafa Kemal Atatürk, the founder and first president of Turkey. Its symbol is the Six Arrows (Altı Ok).

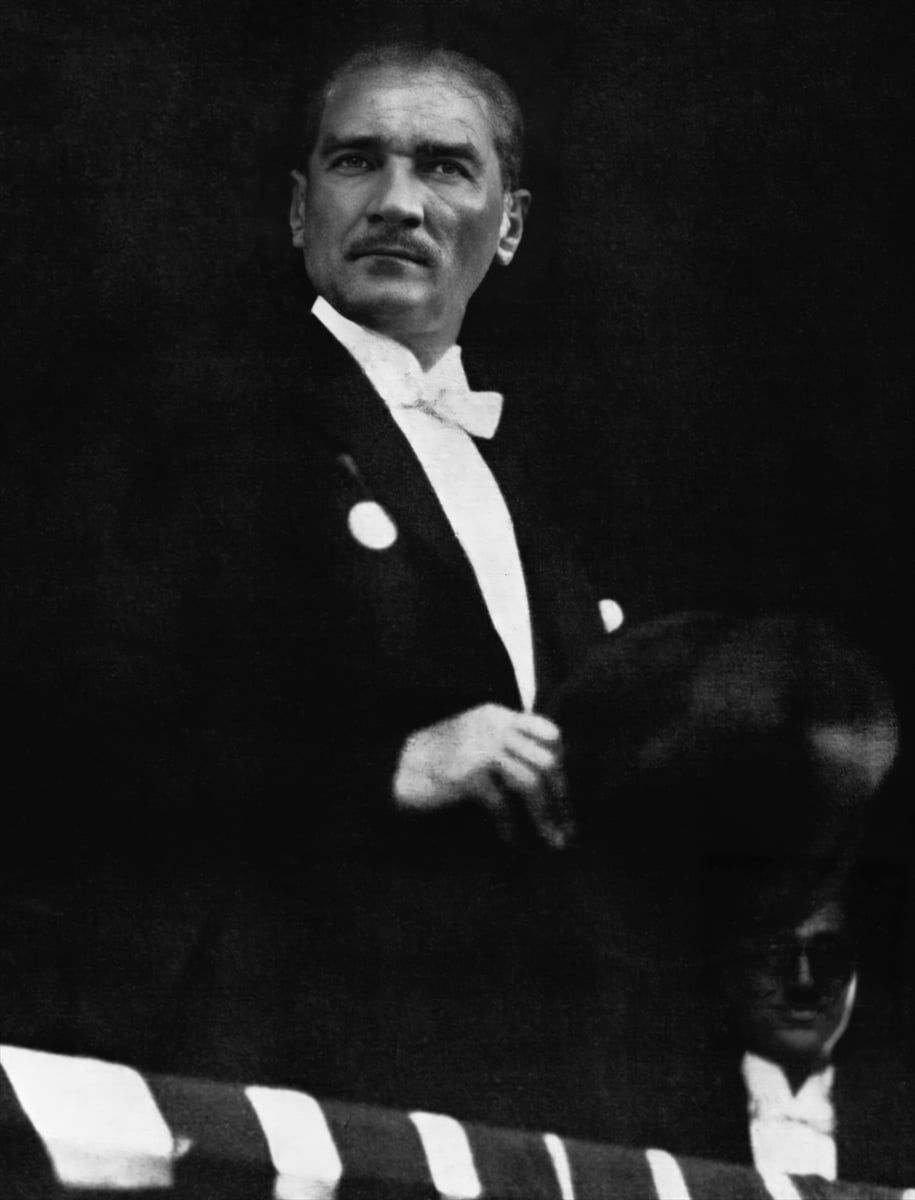
Founder of the Republic of Turkey, Mustafa Kemal Atatürk, in 1925

Turkey during the Atatürk era was defined by sweeping political, social, cultural, and religious reforms designed to separate the Republican state from its Ottoman predecessor and embrace a Western lifestyle, including the establishment of secularism/laicism, state support of the sciences, gender equality, economic statism, and more. Most of those policies were first introduced to and implemented in Turkey during Atatürk's presidency through his reforms.

== Origins ==
Various reforms to avoid the imminent collapse of the Empire, began chiefly in the 19th-century Tanzimat reforms. The mid-century Young Ottomans attempted to create the ideology of Ottoman nationalism, or Ottomanism, to quell the rising ethnic nationalism in the Empire and introduce limited democracy for the first time while maintaining Islamist influences. With their demise under Sultan Abdul Hamid II's absolutist reign, in the early 20th century the Young Turks picked up their legacy. Atatürk's formative years were spent in Hamidian Salonica. During his time in the army, he joined the Committee of Union and Progress (CUP), which was agitating for constitutionalism against Hamidian absolutism, and abandoned Ottoman nationalism in favour of Turkish nationalism, while adopting a secular political outlook.

Atatürk was not in a position to play a major role in the Young Turk Revolution of 1908, which reinstated the constitution, though he was a key player in the deposition of Abdul Hamid during the 31 March Incident. During the Second Constitutional Era personal rivalries with İsmail Enver and Ahmed Cemal meant that he was kept at arms-length from power: the Central Committee of the CUP. It also didn't help that Atatürk mostly disagreed with the policies of the radical Unionists. However this allowed him to observe the CUP's successes and shortcomings in implementing their programs. During World War I, his military career took off with his defence of Gallipoli, and by the war's end he was a Pasha in charge of three army commands on the Syrian Front.

Following the Ottoman Empire's defeat -and the CUP's self-liquidation- by the war's end, Atatürk lead a military campaign against the Allies' planned partition of Anatolia and Eastern Thrace known as the Turkish War of Independence. This conflict being simultaneously a revolution, by 1923 his counter government based in Ankara abolished the Ottoman monarchy and proclaimed a Republic. In Atatürk's 15 years as president, many sweeping reforms were introduced that advanced a secular, republican, and unitary agenda for the Republic of Turkey. His doctrine was implanted into the Constitution as state ideology in 1937.

== Principles ==
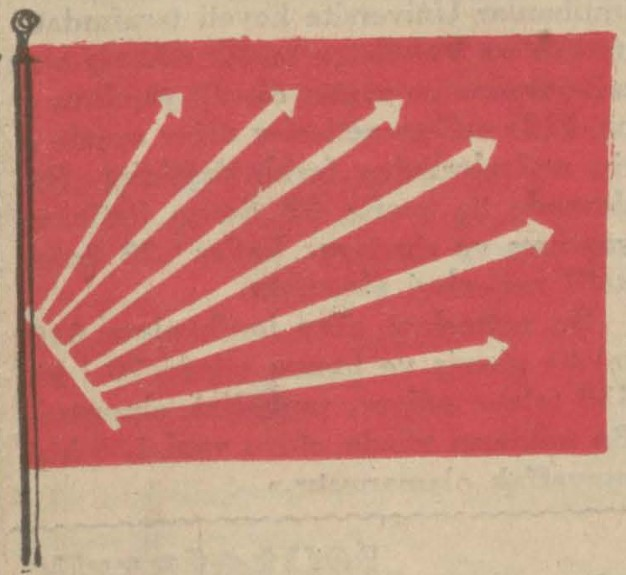
The Six Arrows flag inspired by the Turkish arrows in Topkapı Palace

Atatürk refrained from being dogmatic and described his ideology to be based on science and reason.

There are six principles (ilke) of the ideology: Republicanism (cumhuriyetçilik), Populism (halkçılık), Nationalism (milliyetçilik), Laicism (laiklik), Statism (devletçilik), and Reformism (inkılapçılık). Together, they represent a kind of Jacobinism, defined by Atatürk himself as a method of employing political despotism to break down the social despotism prevalent among the traditionally-minded Turkish-Muslim population, caused by, he believed, the bigotry of the ulema.

=== Republicanism ===
Republicanism (cumhuriyetçilik) in the Kemalist framework replaced the monarchy of the Ottoman dynasty with the rule of law, popular sovereignty and civic virtue, including an emphasis on liberty practiced by citizens. Kemalist republicanism defines a type of constitutional republic, in which representatives of the people are elected, and must govern in accordance with existing constitutional law that limits governmental power over citizens. The head of state and other officials are chosen by election rather than inheriting their positions, and their decisions are subject to judicial review. In defending the change from the Ottoman State, Kemalism asserts that all laws of the Republic of Turkey should be inspired by the actual needs here on Earth as a basic tenet of national life. Kemalism advocates a republican system as the best representative of the wishes of the people.

Among the many types of republic, the Kemalist republic consists of a parliament chosen in general elections, a president as head of state elected by parliament and serving for a limited term, a prime minister appointed by the president, and other ministers appointed by parliament. The president does not have direct executive powers but has limited veto powers, as well the right to contest with referendum. The day-to-day operation of government is the responsibility of the Council of Ministers formed by the prime minister and the other ministers. There is a separation of powers between the executive (president and Council of Ministers), the legislative (Parliament) and the judiciary, in which no one branch of government has authority over another—although parliament is charged with the supervision of the Council of Ministers, which can be compelled to resign by a vote of no-confidence.

The Kemalist republic is a unitary state in which three organs of state govern the nation as a single unit, with one constitutionally created legislature. On some issues, the political power of government is transferred to lower levels, to local elected assemblies represented by mayors, but the central government retains the principal governing role.

=== Populism ===
Dimensions of populism

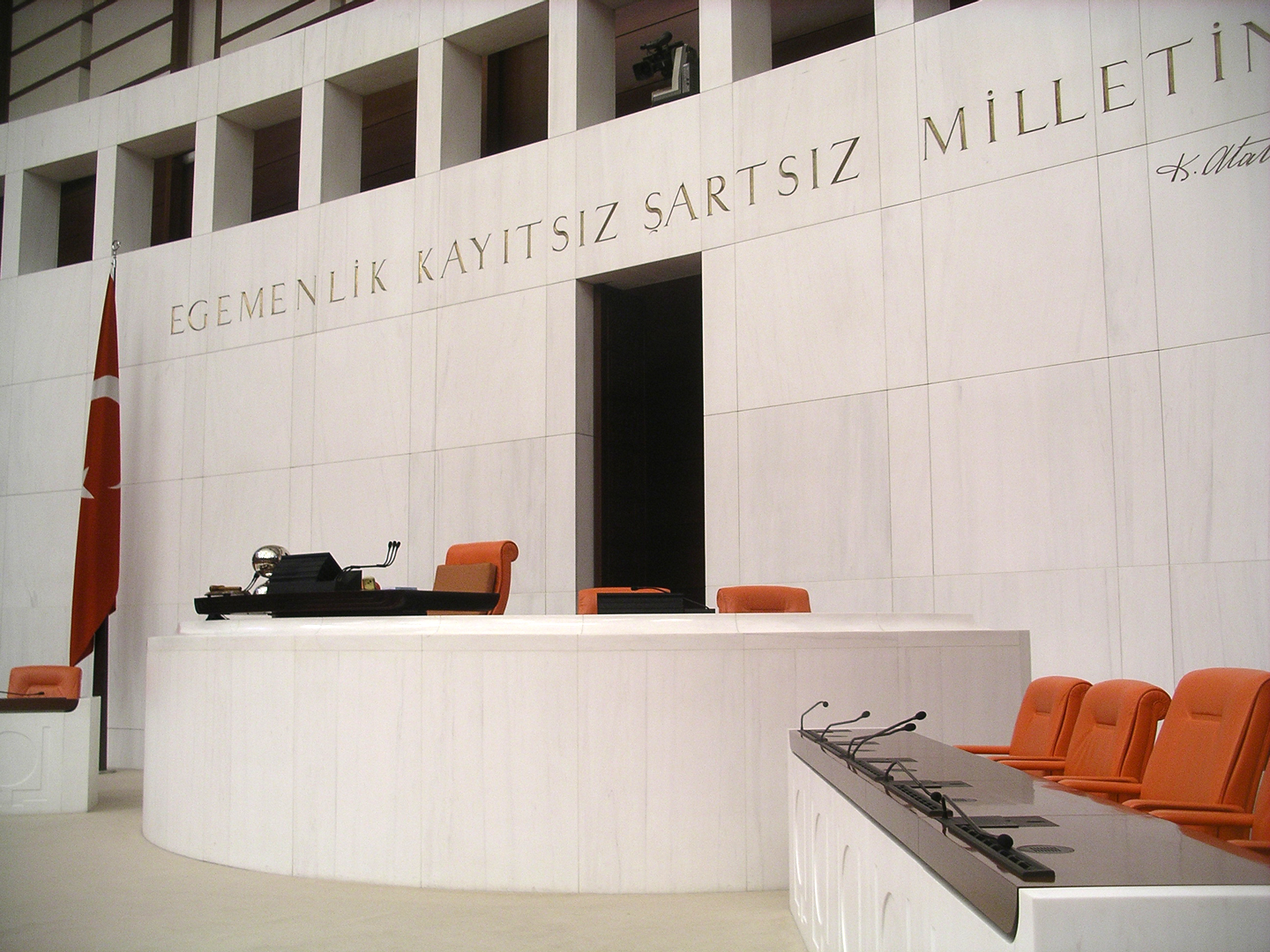
"Sovereignty belongs, without any restrictions or conditions, to the nation" embossed behind the speaker's seat at the GNA

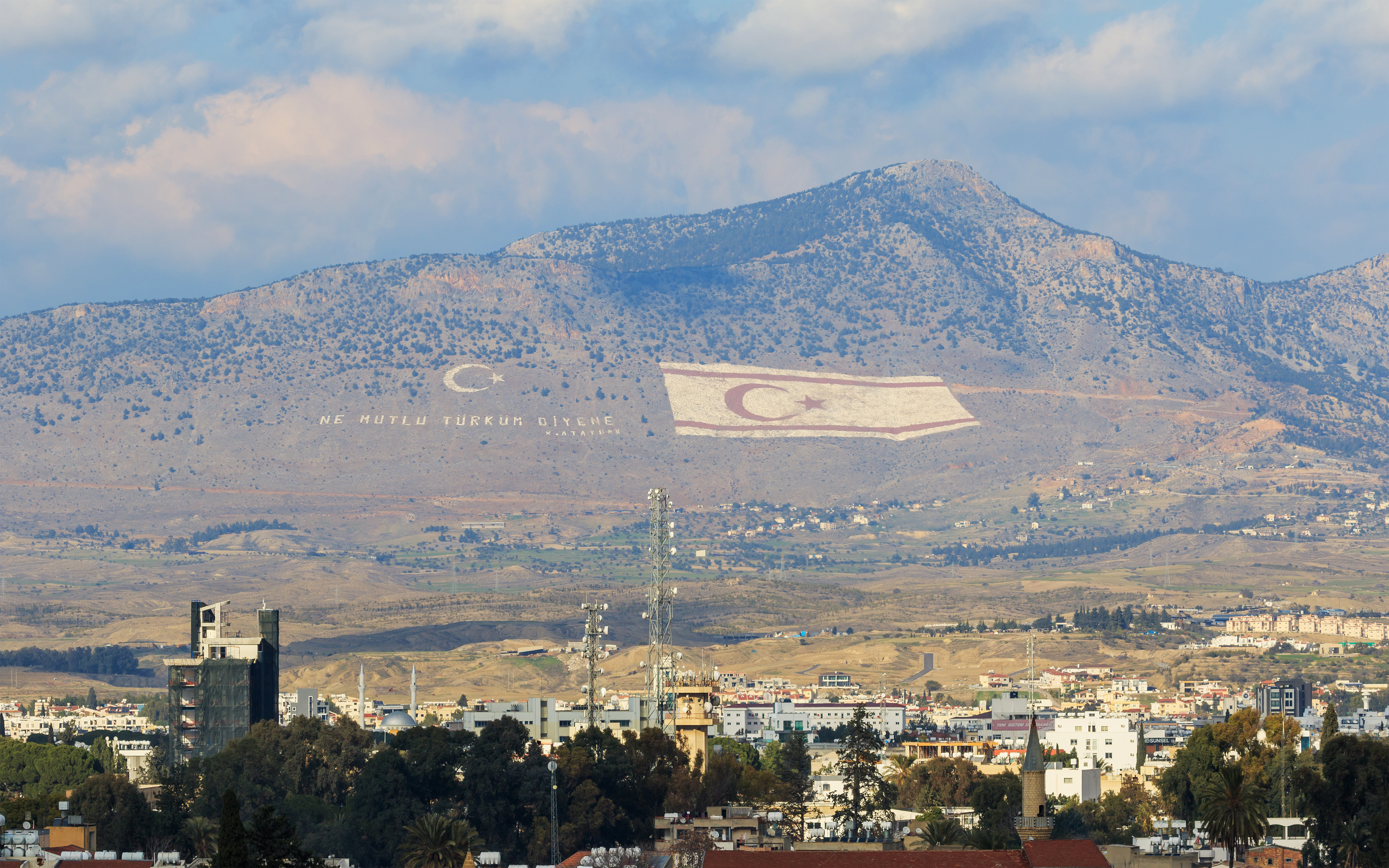
The motto, "Ne mutlu Türküm diyene", embossed on the Kyrenia Mountains in Northern Cyprus

Populism (halkçılık) is defined as a social revolution aimed to transfer the political power to citizenship. Kemalist populism intends not only to establish popular sovereignty but also the transfer of the social-economic transformation to realise a true populist state. However, Kemalists reject class conflict and collectivism. Kemalist populism believes national identity is above all else. Kemalist populism envisions a sociality that emphasizes class collaboration and national unity like solidarism. Populism in Turkey is to create a unifying force that brings a sense of the Turkish state and the power of the people to bring in that new unity.

Kemalist populism is an extension of the Kemalist modernisation movement, aiming to make Islam compatible with the modern nation-state. This included state supervision of religious schools and organisations. Mustafa Kemal himself said "everyone needs a place to learn religion and faith; that place is a mektep, not a madrasa." This was intended to combat the "corruption" of Islam by the ulema. Kemal believed that during the Ottoman period, the ulema had come to exploit the power of their office and manipulate religious practices to their own benefit. It was also feared that, were education not brought under state control, unsupervised madrasas could exacerbate the rising problem of tarikat insularity that threatened to undermine the unity of the Turkish state.

==== Sovereignty ====
Kemalist social theory (populism) does not accept any adjectives placed before the definition of a nation [a nation of ...]. Sovereignty must belong solely to people without any term, condition, etc.:

Ḥâkimiyet bilâ ḳaydü şarṭ Milletiñdir

Egemenlik kayıtsız şartsız Milletindir

Sovereignty belongs to the nation unrestrictedly and unconditionally

— Mustafa Kemal Atatürk

==== Motto ====
Populism was used against the political domination of sheikhs, tribal leaders, and the Islamic political system of the Ottoman Empire.

Atatürk's nationalism aimed to shift the political legitimacy from royal autocracy (by the Ottoman dynasty), theocracy (based in the Ottoman Caliphate), and feudalism (tribal leaders) to the active participation of its citizenry, the Turks. Kemalist social theory wanted to establish the value of Turkish citizenship. A sense of pride associated with this citizenship would give the needed psychological spur for people to work harder and achieve a sense of unity and national identity. Active participation, or the "will of the people", was established with the republican regime and Turkishness replacing the other forms of affiliations that had been promoted in the Ottoman Empire (such as the allegiance to the different millets that eventually led to divisiveness in the empire). The motto "How happy is the one who says I am a Turk" (Ne mutlu Türküm diyene) was promoted against such mottoes as "long live the Sultan," "long live the Sheikh", or "long live the Caliph."

=== Laicism ===
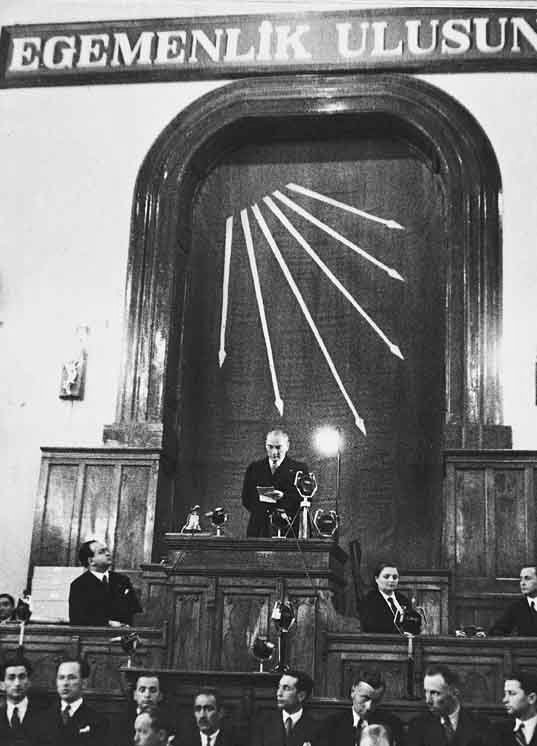
Atatürk's Six Main Principles symbolised by the Six Arrows

Laicism (laiklik) in Kemalist ideology aims to banish religious interference in government affairs, and vice versa. It differs from the passive Anglo-American concept of secularism, but is similar to the concept of laïcité in France.

The roots of Kemalist secularism lie in the reform efforts in the late Ottoman Empire, especially the Tanzimat period and the later Second Constitutional Era. The Ottoman Empire was an Islamic state in which the head of the Ottoman state held the position of the Caliph. The social system was organized according to various systems, including the religiously organized Millet system and Shari'ah law, allowing religious ideology to be incorporated into the Ottoman administrative, economic, and political system. In the Second Constitutional Era, the Ottoman Parliament pursued largely secular policies, although techniques of religious populism and attacks on other candidates' piety still occurred between Ottoman political parties during elections. These policies were stated as the reason for the 31 March Incident by Islamists and absolute monarchists. The secular policies of the Ottoman parliament also factored in the Arab Revolt during World War I.

When secularism was implemented in the fledgling Turkish state, it was initiated by the abolition of the centuries-old caliphate in March 1924. The office of Shaykh al-Islām was replaced with the Presidency of Religious Affairs (Diyanet). In 1926, the mejelle and shari'ah law codes were abandoned in favour of an adapted Swiss Civil Code and a penal code modelled on the German and Italian codes. Other religious practices were done away with, resulting in the dissolution of Sufi orders and the penalization of wearing a fez, which was viewed by Atatürk as a tie to the Ottoman past.

==== State and religion (laïcité) ====
Atatürk was profoundly influenced by the triumph of laïcité in France. Atatürk perceived the French model as the authentic form of secularism. Kemalism strove to control religion and transform it into a private affair rather than an institution interfering with politics, as well as scientific and social progress. It is more than merely creating a separation between state and religion. Atatürk has been described as working as if he were Leo the Isaurian, Martin Luther, the Baron d'Holbach, Ludwig Büchner, Émile Combes, and Jules Ferry rolled into one in creating Kemalist secularism. Kemalist secularism does not imply nor advocate agnosticism or nihilism; it means freedom of thought and independence of the institutions of the state from the dominance of religious thought and religious institutions. The Kemalist principle of laicism is not against moderate and apolitical religion, but against religious forces opposed to and fighting modernization and democracy.

According to the Kemalist perception, the Turkish state is to stand at an equal distance from every religion, neither promoting nor condemning any set of religious beliefs. Kemalists, however, have called for not only separation of church and state but also a call for the state control of the Turkish Muslim religious establishment. For some Kemalists, this means that the state must be at the helm of religious affairs, and all religious activities are under the supervision of the state. This, in turn, drew criticism from the religious conservatives. Religious conservatives were vocal in rejecting this idea, saying that to have a secular state, the state can't control the activities of religious institutions. Despite their protest, this policy was officially adopted by the 1961 constitution.

Kemalist policies aimed to stamp out the religious element within society. After the end of the Turkish War of Independence, all education was under the control of the state in both secular and religious schools. It centralized the education system, with one curriculum in both religious and secular public schools, in the hope this would eliminate or lessen the appeal of religious schools. The laws were meant to abolish the Sufi religious schools or orders (tarikats) and their lodges (tekkes). Titles like sheikh and dervish were abolished, and their activities were banned by the government. The day of rest was changed by the government from Friday to Sunday. But the restrictions on personal choice extended to both religious duty and naming. Turks had to adopt a surname and were not allowed to perform the hajj (pilgrimage to Mecca).

==== Politics and religion (secularism) ====
The Kemalist form of separation of state and religion sought the reform of a complete set of institutions, interest groups (such as political parties, unions, and lobbies), the relationships between those institutions, and the political norms and rules that governed their functions (constitution, election law). The biggest change in this perspective was the abolishment of the Ottoman Caliphate on 3 March 1924, followed by the removal of its political mechanisms. The article stating that "the established religion of Turkey is Islam" was removed from the constitution on 10 April 1928.

From a political perspective, Kemalism is anti-clerical, in that it seeks to prevent religious influence on the democratic process, which was a problem even in the largely secular politics of the Second Constitutional Era of the Ottoman Empire, when even non-religiously affiliated political parties like the Committee of Union and Progress and the Freedom and Accord Party feuded over matters such as the Islamic piety of their candidates in the Ottoman elections of 1912. Thus, in the Kemalist political perspective, politicians cannot claim to be the protector of any religion or religious sect, and such claims constitute sufficient legal grounds for the permanent banning of political parties.

==== Insignia ====
The Ottoman social system was based on religious affiliation. Religious insignia extended to every social function. Clothing identified citizens with their own particular religious grouping; headgear distinguished rank and profession. Turbans, fezes, bonnets, and head-dresses denoted the sex, rank, and profession — both civil and military — of the wearer. Religious insignia outside of worship areas became banned.

While Atatürk considered women's religious coverings as antithetical to progress and equality, he also recognized that headscarves were not such a danger to the separation of church and state to warrant an outright ban. But the Constitution was amended in 1982, following the 1980 coup by the Kemalist-leaning military, to prohibit women's use of Islamic coverings such as the hijab at higher education institutions. Joost Lagendijk, a member of the European Parliament and chair of the Joint Parliamentary Committee with Turkey, has publicly criticized these clothing restrictions for Muslim women, whereas the European Court of Human Rights has ruled in numerous cases that such restrictions in public buildings and educational institutions do not constitute a violation of human rights.

=== Reformism ===
Reformism (Turkish: inkılapçılık) is a principle which calls for the country to replace the traditional institutions and concepts with modern institutions and concepts. This principle advocated the need for fundamental social change through reform as a strategy to achieve a modern society. The core of the reform, in the Kemalist sense, was an accomplished fact. In a Kemalist sense, there is no possibility of return to the old systems because they were deemed backward.

The principle of reformism went beyond the recognition of the reforms made during Atatürk's lifetime. Atatürk's reforms in the social and political spheres are accepted as irreversible. Atatürk never entertained the possibility of a pause or transition phase during the course of the progressive unfolding or implementation of the reform. The current understanding of this concept can be described as "active modification". Turkey and its society, taking over institutions from Western Europe, must add Turkish traits and patterns to them and adapt them to Turkish culture, according to Kemalism. The implementation of the Turkish traits and patterns of these reforms takes generations of cultural and social experience, which results in the collective memory of the Turkish nation.

=== Nationalism ===
On 29 October 1935, the 12th anniversary of the proclamation of the republic, the daily Akşam featured three Turkish nationalist symbolisms on its front page: The Grey Wolf, the Star and Crescent, and the Six Arrows.

Nationalism (Turkish: milliyetçilik): The Kemalist revolution aimed to create a nation state from the remnants of the multi-religious and multi-ethnic Ottoman Empire. Atatürk's nationalism originates from the social contract theories, especially from the civic nationalist principles advocated by Jean-Jacques Rousseau and his Social Contract. The Kemalist perception of social contract was facilitated by the dissolution of the Ottoman Empire, which was perceived as a product of failure of the Ottoman "Millet" system and the ineffective Ottomanism policy. Atatürk's nationalism, after experiencing the Ottoman Empire's breakup, defined the social contract as its "highest ideal".

In the administration and defense of the Turkish Nation; national unity, national awareness and national culture are the highest ideals that we fix our eyes upon.

— Mustafa Kemal Atatürk

Kemalist ideology defines the "Turkish Nation" (Türk Ulusu) as a nation of Turkish people who always love and seek to exalt their family, country and nation, who know their duties and responsibilities towards the democratic, secular and social state governed by the rule of law, founded on human rights, and on the tenets laid down in the preamble to the constitution of the Republic of Turkey.

Similar to its CUP predecessors, it can be said that Kemalism endorsed social Darwinism in some way by desiring the Turkish youth to be healthy and physically strong.

==== Criteria ====
Atatürk defined the Turkish nation as the "people (halk) who established the Turkish republic". Further, "the natural and historical facts which effected the establishment (teessüs) of the Turkish nation" were "(a) unity in political existence, (b) unity in language, (c) unity in homeland, (d) unity in race and origin (menşe), (e) to be historically related and (f) to be morally related".

Membership is usually gained through birth within the borders of the state and also the principle of jus sanguinis. The Kemalist notion of nationality is integrated into the Article 66 of the Constitution of the Republic of Turkey. Every citizen is recognized as a Turk, regardless of ethnicity, belief, and gender, etc. Turkish nationality law states that he or she can be deprived of his/her nationality only through an act of treason.

Kemalists saw non-Muslims as only nominal citizens, and they have often been treated as second-class citizens in the Republic of Turkey. The identity of Kurds in Turkey was denied for decades with Kurds described as "Mountain Turks". Atatürk stated in 1930:

Within the political and social unity of today's Turkish nation, there are citizens and co-nationals who have been incited to think of themselves as Kurds, Circassians, Laz or Bosnians. But these erroneous appellations - the product of past periods of tyranny - have brought nothing but sorrow to individual members of the nation, with the exception of a few brainless reactionaries, who became the enemy's instruments.

In 2005, the Article 301 of the Turkish Penal code made it a crime to insult Turkishness (Türklük), but under pressure of the EU, this was changed in 2008 to protect the "Turkish nation" instead of Turkish ethnicity, an 'imagined' nationhood of people living within the National Pact (Misak-ı Milli) borders.

===== Turkism =====
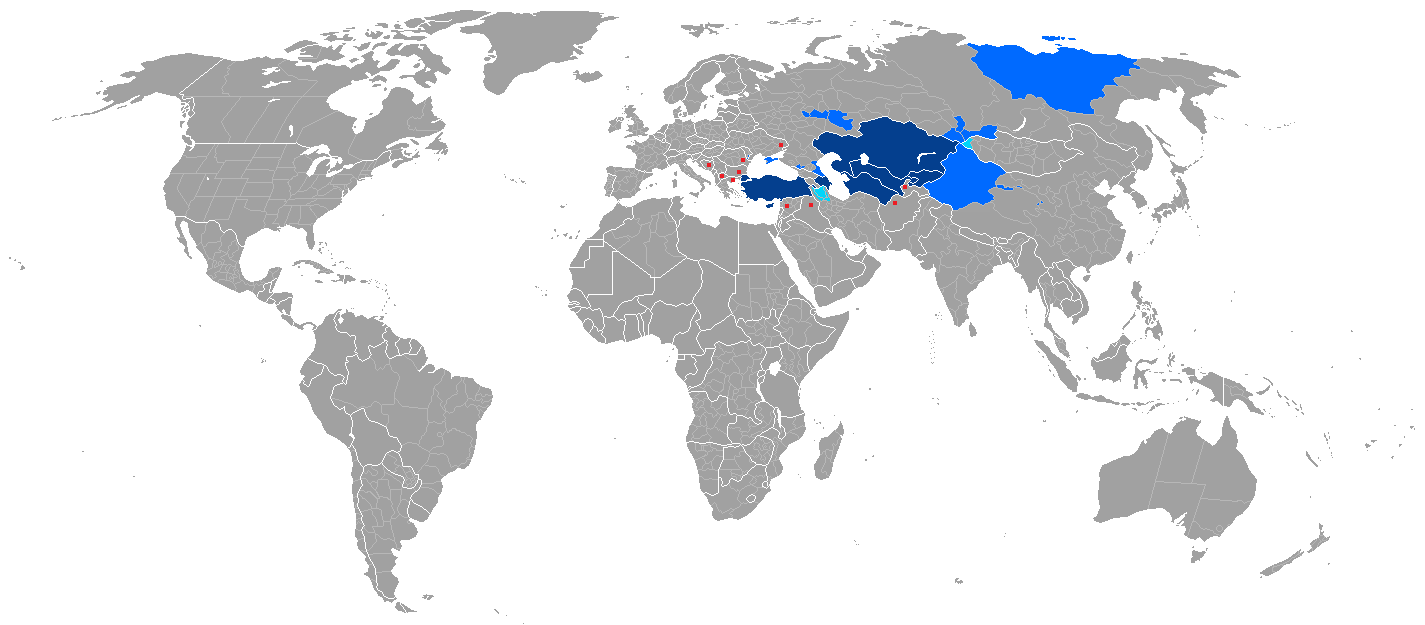
Turkic languages speaking areas

Kemalism focused on the nation-state's narrower interests, renouncing the concern for the "Outside Turks".

Pan-Turkism was an ethnocentric ideology [to unite all ethnically Turkic nations] while Kemalism is polycentric [united under a "common will"] in character. Kemalism wants to have an equal footing among the mainstream world civilizations. Pan-Turkists have consistently emphasized the special attributes of the Turkic peoples, and wanted to unite all of the Turkic peoples. Kemalism wants an equal footing (based on respect) and does not aim to unite the people of Turkey with all the other Turkic nations. Most Kemalists were not interested in Pan-Turkism and from 1923 to 1950 (the single state period) reacted with particular firmness. Further more, Atatürk opposed Pan-Turkism in his speech (Nutuk) as following:

Gathering various nations under a common and general title and establishing a strong state by keeping these various groups of elements under the same law and conditions is a bright and attractive political view; but it is deceptive. In fact, it is an impossible goal to unite all the Turks in the world into a state, without any borders. This is a truth that centuries and people who have lived for centuries brought about through very painful and bloody events. It cannot be seen in history that panislamism and panturanism were successful and were practiced in the world. Though, the results of the ambitions for the establishment of a state, covering all humanity, regardless of race, are written in history.

However, Atatürk owned the idea of taking Turkicness as one of the identities of Turkish nation. Turkish History Thesis started under Atatürk's order and administration, which contained ethno-racial ideas based on Turkish origins coming from Central Asia. Also Atatürk era high school books contained education of Orkhon alphabet and a unit under the title of "Greater Turkic history and Civilization". The book also gave detailed information about empires which are Turkic such as Göktürks or "claimed to be Turkic" such as Scythians, Xiongnu, and so on.

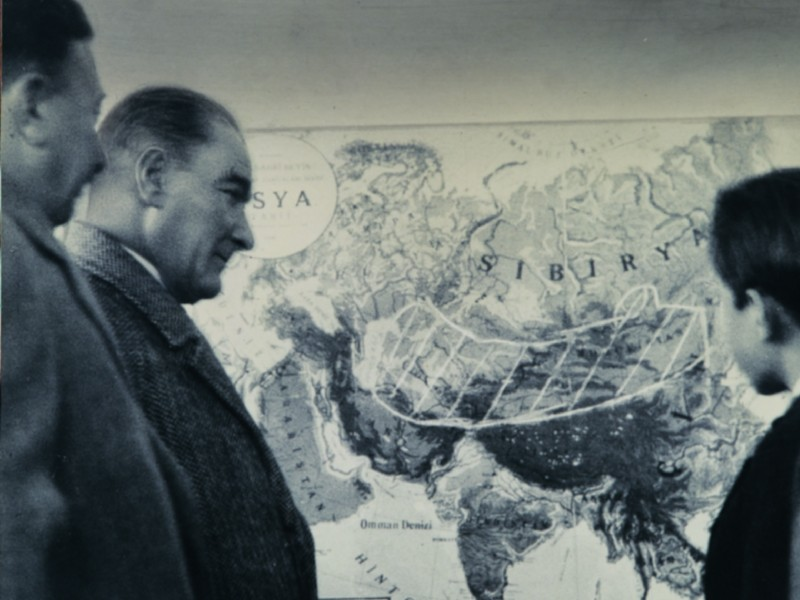
Atatürk analysing Turkic Khaganate map

With the supports of newly founded Turkish Republic, a Pan-Turkist organisation known as "Turkish Hearths", re-established in Atatürk's era to get Turkists' support during the revolutions. Atatürk was frequently giving speeches on Turkish Hearths after important events occurred in Turkey. Also reopening of Turkish magazine "Türk Yurdu" which was an organ of Turkish Hearts, was supported. Later, in 1931, Turkish Hearts were closed by Atatürk after they lost their non-political stance, because of their Pan-Turkist views and movements; and with all of its premises, it merged to the ruling party CHP.

Kemalism had a narrower definition of language, which sought to remove (purify) the Persian, Arabic, Greek, Latin, etc. words from the Turkish language and replace them with either Turkic originated words or derive new words with Turkic roots.

==== Kemalism and the Hittites ====
The Turkish History Thesis sought to portray Turks as an autochthonous population of Anatolia by identifying ancient Anatolian peoples, particularly the Hittites, as Turks. Burton writes that this allowed them to acknowledge the Turks' linguistic-cultural connection to Central Asia while maintaining claims that they were the original inhabitants of Anatolia. Scholars have characterized the historical and racial claims used to develop the Turkish History Thesis as pseudoscientific, distorted, or fabricated.

Kemalist researchers, such as Ahmet Ağaoğlu (who was an advisor to Atatürk and a politician who played an important role in creating the Turkish Constitution of 1924), believed that the nation must portray Hittites as a world-domineering Turkish race with firm roots in Anatolia. In Afet İnan's interpretation of anthropometric data, variation in regions inhabited by Kurds, Armenians, and other non-Turks was attributed to invading "foreign races".

Modern genetic researches on Turkish people show that Anatolian Turks are a mixture of Turkic tribes and Anatolian natives; however, unlike the Turkish History Thesis, these two admixtures do not originate from the same ethnicity, race, or identity.

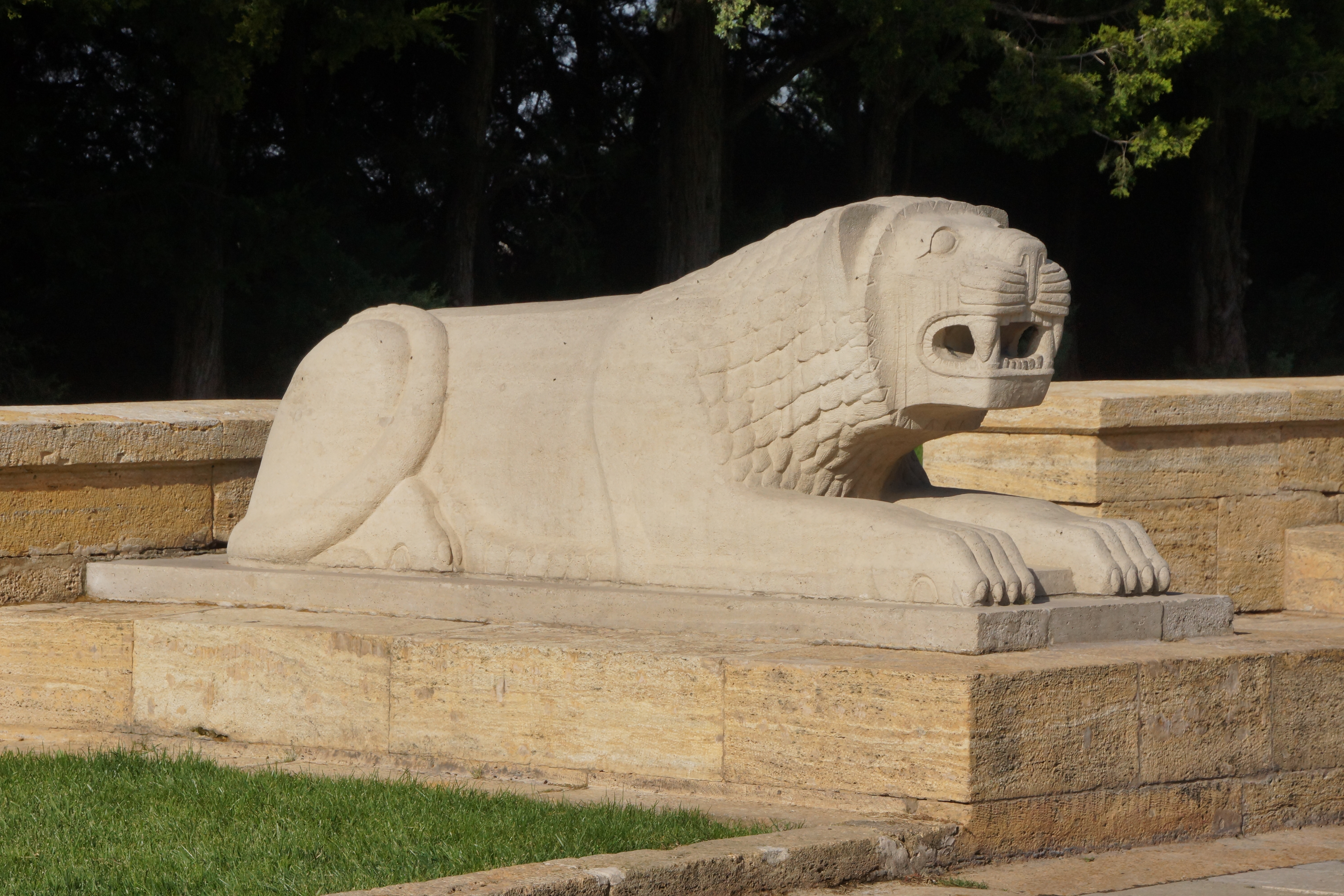
One of the lions at "Road of Lions" in Anıtkabir, which are replicas of ancient Hittite lion statues

=== Statism ===
Statism (devletçilik): Atatürk made clear in his statements and policies that Turkey's complete modernisation was very much dependent on economic and technological development. The principle of Kemalist statism is generally interpreted to mean that the state was to regulate the country's general economic activities and engage in areas where private enterprises are not willing to do so. This was the result of post-independence war Turkey needing to redefine the relationship between societal and international capitalism. The war left Turkey in ruins, as the Ottoman Empire was focused on raw materials and was an open market in the international capitalist system. Post-war Turkey has been largely defined by its agricultural society, which includes many landlords and merchants. The control of people in the Turkish economy is quite evident from 1923 to the 1930s, but they still managed, through foreign joint investment, to establish a state economic enterprise. However, after the Great Depression, there was a shift to more inward-looking development strategies during an era generally referred to as "etatism". During this era, the state had an active involvement in both capital accumulation and investment as well as in taking the interest of private businesses into consideration. The state often stepped into economic areas that the private sector did not cover, either due to not being strong enough or having simply failed to do so. These were often infrastructure projects and power stations, but also iron and steel industries, while the masses shouldered the burden of capital accumulation.

== Analysis ==
=== Kemalism and Turkey's political parties ===
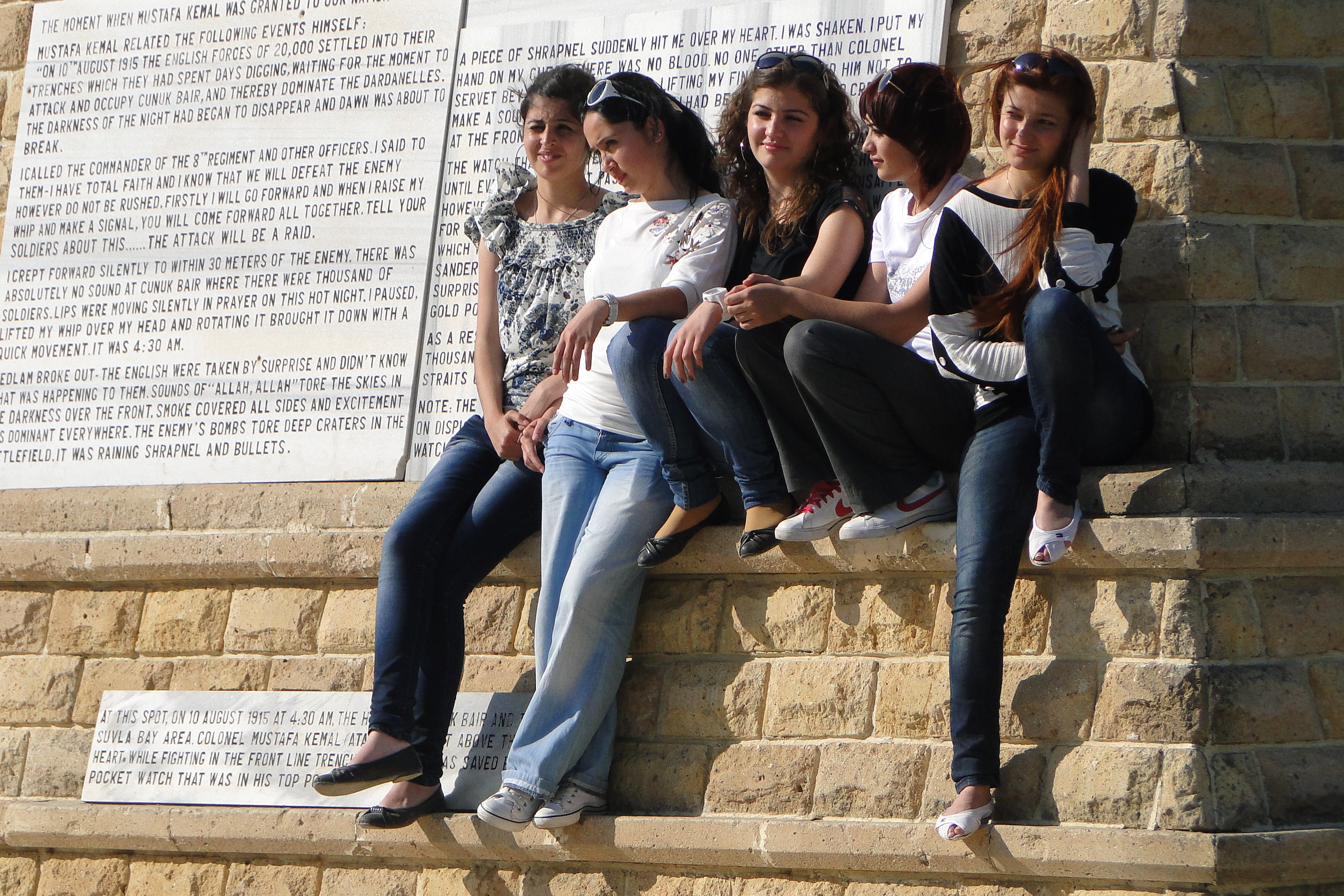
Young Turkish women pose on Atatürk memorial

The Republican People's Party (CHP) was established by Mustafa Kemal Atatürk on 9 September 1923, not long before the declaration of the Republic of Turkey on 29 October. The Republican People's Party did not attempt to update or define the philosophical roots of its Kemalism between the 1940s and the 1960s.

Since the 1960s, it has been generally considered, the CHP has moved to a position that is more centre-left; supporters of the party appear to have generally accepted the idea that structural changes brought forth by the government were necessary for modernization. Later, in the 1970s, due to a wider rejection and abandonment of Kemalism, in Turkish society, the CHP made more fundamental and left-leaning changes to its party platform, including programs that were labelled "democratic left".

By the early 21st century, most Kemalists (within or outside the CHP) still believed in the original six principles, whilst others criticized and explicitly sought to reduce the statist tendencies of Kemalism.

Use of "Kemalism" as a descriptive term of political discourse is often attributed to Bozkurt, Ahmet Cevat Emre and politician Yakup Kadri Karaosmanoğlu. The latter used the term on 28 June 1929 to refer to the ideology consisting of "the basic principles and values of the Turkish path to modernity."

=== Kemalism and Turkey's constitutional law ===
The six principles were solidified on 5 February 1937, 14 years after establishment of the Republic of Turkey.

In the 1924 Constitutional Law Article 2, Clause 1:

Turkey is republican, nationalist, attached to the people, interventionist, secular, and revolutionary.

Both the military coup of 1960 and the military coup of 1980 were followed by fundamental revisions of the Turkish Constitution. The texts of the new constitutions were approved by popular referendum in each case.

In the 1961 Constitutional Law Article 1, Clause 1 states "The Turkish State is a Republic." Article 2, Clause 1:

The Turkish Republic is a nationalistic, democratic, secular and social state, governed by the rule of law, based on human rights and fundamental tenets set forth in the preamble.

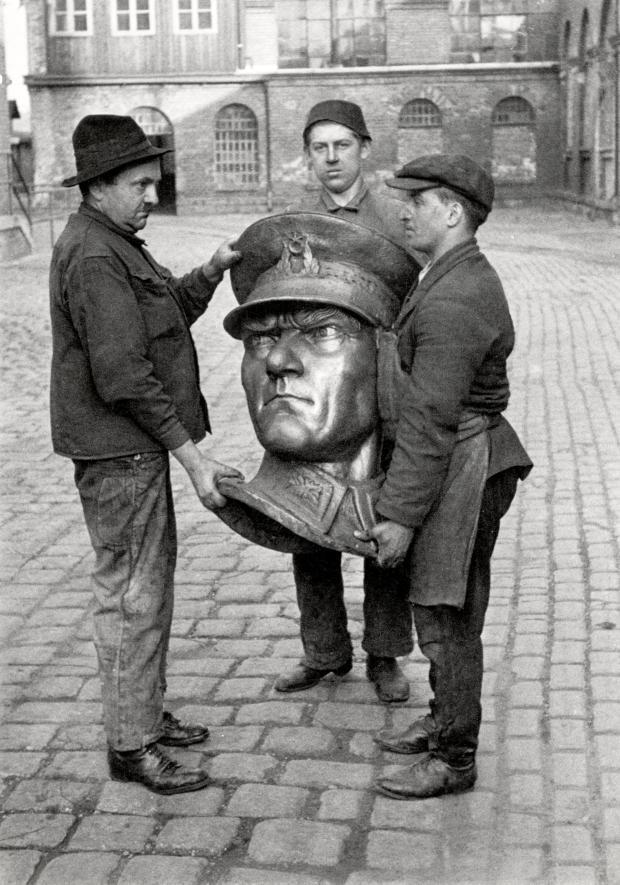
Turkish workers carrying the bronze head of a statue of Atatürk (Turkey, 1933). His statues were placed in all public buildings in the nation and his values are encoded in the constitution.

In the 1982 Constitutional Law Article 1, Clause 1 states "The Turkish State is a Republic." Article 2, Clause 1:

The Republic of Turkey is a democratic, secular and social state governed by the rule of law; bearing in mind the concepts of public peace, national solidarity and justice; respecting human rights; loyal to the nationalism of Atatürk, and based on the fundamental tenets set forth in the Preamble.

Only the principles of secularism, nationalism and democracy were maintained in each change to the constitution. The 1961 Constitution more strongly emphasized human rights, the rule of law, and the welfare state than the original 1924 constitution, while the 1982 constitution focused on the peace of the community and national solidarity, but also explicitly referenced some of Atatürk's principles and included them as well.

=== External interpretations of Kemalism ===
In the 1920s and 1930s, Turkey's domestic transformations and the evolution of the Kemalist system of ideological and political principles were closely observed in Germany, France, Britain, the US, and beyond, including several nations farther East. In recent years, scholarly interest in the transnational history of Kemalism has expanded. Some scholars have focused on the interwar period in Bulgaria, Cyprus, Albania, Yugoslavia, and Egypt to reveal how, as a practical tool, Kemalism was relocated as a global movement, whose influence is still felt today. Some scholars have examined the impact of Atatürk's reforms and his image on the Jewish community in British-ruled Palestine before the establishment of Israel, some went farther East—to Persia, Afghanistan, China, India, and other parts of the Muslim world—to assess the influence wielded by Mustafa Kemal and his modernisation project. These works explore perceptions of Kemalism that are mostly positive in their respective countries providing few critical insights into Kemalism's evolution and its reception as an ideological project.

The Bolsheviks regarded Kemalists as an ally against the Western imperialism led by British Empire but feared that the Greeks could establish a "Great Armenian-Byzantine state" in Anatolia, which would border Russia. The intolerance against communists in Turkey was overlooked by the Soviet leadership to unite against the common enemy. The Germans of 1920s were similarly intrigued by Kemalism. That a member of the Central Powers fought a war of liberation impressed the German society. The Nazis viewed Kemalist Turkey as a "postgenocidal paradise" worthy of emulation. Nazis often stated that Nazism and Kemalism were very similar. In 1933, Nazis openly admired Kemalist Turkey. Hitler described Mustafa Kemal as the "star in the darkness".

Historian Şükrü Hanioğlu describes Kemalism as "scientifically sanctioned version of Turkish nationalism." It drew upon the Enlightenment ideas of the American and French revolutions, 19th century positivism and republicanism. It is centered around Atatürk, who reigned as an enlightened autocrat and brought top-down changes to a backwater society, in the style of Friedrich the Great and Catherine the Great. Although those who view Kemalism in a positive light link Kemalist secularism to the Enlightenment, Kemalism rejects certain Western emancipatory ideologies such as liberalism and socialism that derived from the Enlightenment.

Beyond observation, several leaders actively sought to replicate elements of the Kemalist programme. In Iran, Reza Shah Pahlavi modelled many of his modernisation reforms on the Kemalist experience; after visiting Turkey in 1934, he accelerated efforts including compulsory Western-style dress codes for men and restrictions on the veil, paralleling Turkey's 1925 Hat Law.^{[ref 1]} King Amanullah of Afghanistan, who in 1928 became the first head of state to make an official visit to the Turkish Republic, similarly drew on the Kemalist model, though his government lacked the institutional capacity to enforce systematic reform.^{[ref 1]} In Tunisia, Habib Bourguiba openly acknowledged Ataturk as an inspiration for his programme of secular nation-building; the 1956 Personal Status Code, which abolished polygamy and established spousal equality in divorce, closely mirrored Kemalist family law reforms, though Bourguiba adopted a more gradualist approach to avoid alienating conservative elements.^{[ref 2]} Scholars have argued that the making of Kemalism as a transnational political category was embedded in the circulations and hybridities of the post-Ottoman space, with its influence transmitted not only through governance practices but also through material culture, conceptions of gender, and scientific debates.^{[ref 3]}

== See also ==
- Anti-Kemalism
- Left Kemalism
- Liberal Kemalism
- Post-Kemalism
- Islamokemalism
- Kadro
- Kemalist historiography
- Social corporatism
- Ulusalcılık

=== Similar ideologies ===
- Ecevitism
- Erdoğanism
- İttihadism
- Bourguibism
- Qasimism
- Mosaddeghism
