= Politics of Kurdistan =

Governance style and political dynamics across Kurdistan

The politics of Kurdistan (Kurdish: سیاسەتی کوردستان, romanized: Siyasetî Kurdistan, or ڕامیاری کوردستان, Řamiyarî Kurdistan), particularly within the Kurdistan Region (KRI), constitute a complex system of governance, ethnic relations, and international diplomacy. The KRI, established as a federal and semi-autonomous region of Iraq, is primarily inhabited by Kurds and governed under a parliamentary system. The region's political landscape has been shaped by ongoing events, including internal divisions and external pressures. Two dominant political parties are Kurdistan Democratic Party (KDP) and Patriotic Union of Kurdistan (PUK), they have played a central role in the region's governance, particularly since the fall of Saddam Hussein in 2003. Their rivalry and cooperation have significantly influenced the political dynamics and institutional development of the region.

As the Kurdistan Regional Government (KRG) approaches pivotal parliamentary elections in 2024, the interplay of internal strife, external pressures, and aspirations for democratic reform is expected to shape the future trajectory of Kurdish politics. These dynamics raise ongoing questions about the sustainability of the region's autonomous governance amid persistent challenges. The KRI's geopolitical significance has also attracted growing international attention, with the region engaging in paradiplomacy to strengthen its foreign relations and economic initiatives. This includes maintaining strategic ties with various countries, notably the United States and Iran.

In Turkey, the Kurdish political movement has been a subject of significant controversy, often perceived by the state as linked to separatism, resulting in a tense and frequently adversarial relationship with the Government of Turkey.

In Iran, the Kurdish political movement traces its roots to the establishment of the Kurdistan Democratic Party of Iran (KDPI), and the Republic of Mahabad in 1946, reflecting a broader historical struggle for Kurdish identity, political representation, and regional autonomy.

In Syria, the Kurdish political movement (particularly through the Rojava revolution) has attracted international attention due to the prominent role of Kurdish-led forces in resisting ISIS and their efforts to establish a decentralized and democratic governing system in northern Syria. The movement has drawn support from various leftist groups in Europe and North America.

== History ==
=== Early Kurdish political structures ===
The dissolution of the Ottoman Empire in the early 20th century had a profound impact on the development of Kurdish national identity and the political aspirations of Kurdish groups. Following the partitioning of the empire, Kurdish-majority regions were divided among the newly established states of Turkey, Iraq, and Syria, resulting in the fragmentation of the Kurdish population across multiple national borders. This division left the Kurds as a stateless people, without a nation of their own, and laid the foundation for decades of political struggle across the region.

Initially, the first Kurdish uprisings against Ottoman authority emerged not as expressions of nationalism, but rather as localized revolts by Kurdish leaders acting within the framework of the empire. These early challengers identified primarily as subjects of the empire rather than as members of a distinct national group. However, this dynamic began to shift in the late 19th and early 20th centuries, as Kurdish nationalist sentiments gradually took root, particularly in response to the empire’s decline and the broader rise of nationalist movements across the region. The Treaty of Sèvres in 1920 further fueled Kurdish political aspirations by proposing the possibility of an autonomous Kurdistan. Although the treaty was never implemented, it marked one of the earliest formal acknowledgments of Kurdish political ambitions by an international agreement. These hopes were later dashed by the Treaty of Lausanne in 1923, which excluded any provision for Kurdish autonomy and solidified the borders of the modern Middle Eastern states.

However, with the establishment of the Republic of Turkey under Mustafa Kemal Atatürk, the idea of a Kurdish homeland was firmly rejected as part of the new state's nationalist policies. These policies emphasized ethnic homogeneity and led to increased repression of Kurdish identity, including efforts at Turkification. As a result, the space for a peaceful and organized Kurdish political movement within Turkey was significantly diminished during the early republican era.

Consequently, the failure of Kurdish nationalists to achieve their goals in the immediate aftermath of World War I can be largely attributed to these developments. The emergence of new nation-states with strong centralizing agendas, combined with the Kurds' fragmented leadership and historical patterns of decentralized governance, posed significant obstacles to the realization of a unified Kurdish political project.

=== Post–World War I ===
The establishment of modern nation-states in the Middle East following World War I significantly complicated Kurdish political aspirations and identity formation. The new borders drawn by colonial powers divided Kurdish populations across several states, limiting prospects for a unified Kurdish polity. While the post-2003 period has brought a degree of political stability and autonomy for Kurds in Iraq, this progress remains fragile, facing risks of internal fragmentation and external pressures from neighboring countries, particularly Turkey and Iran. Ongoing legal and political disputes between Baghdad and the Kurdistan Regional Government over territorial claims and governance continue to complicate relations between the Kurdish population and the central Government of Iraq. In Turkey, nearly 80% of political violence incidents reported in the past year were attributed to Kurdish forces groups, reflecting the ongoing intensity of the conflict between the Turkish state and Kurdish factions, particularly in predominantly Kurdish regions. Similarly, government policies in Iran have contributed to economic underdevelopment and political marginalization in Iranian Kurdistan, fostering a climate of militarization and unrest that has persisted since early Kurdish uprisings in the region.

State strategies implemented by both Turkey and Iran in Kurdish-populated regions have contributed to political instability and economic disparities, prompting some Kurdish groups to pursue alliances with rival actors in response to perceived marginalization. The desire for political autonomy among the Kurds has been reignited by recent regional crises, including the Syrian civil war, prompting renewed calls for greater federalism within Iraq and a reassertion of Kurdish political and cultural rights.

== Kurdish political aspirations ==
In Turkey, Kurds have faced ongoing challenges in preserving their cultural identity within their ancestral lands in the southeast. Successive governments have frequently perceived Kurdish demands for expanded cultural rights and autonomy as a threat to national unity. This dynamic has resulted in a prolonged struggle for linguistic and cultural freedom, often constrained by legal restrictions and social stigmas, despite official claims regarding the protection of minority rights.

In Iran, Kurdish political aspirations revolve around achieving cultural rights, decentralization, and inclusion within a democratic federal framework. Kurdish groups seek fair access to political power and economic resources while maintaining their identity. However, Tehran’s centralized and repressive policies have blocked meaningful reforms and silenced Kurdish activism. Unlike Kurds in Iraq or Turkey, Iranian Kurds lack both regional autonomy and legal political channels. Despite this, major Kurdish parties in Iran continue to reject violence and advocate peaceful dialogue. Their involvement in broader Kurdish causes, such as support for the 2017 Iraqi Kurdistan referendum, reflects a transnational solidarity.

== International relations ==
Kurdistan Region engages in a form of foreign relations known as paradiplomacy, which enables sub-national governments to establish external ties. This approach has become increasingly relevant as the KRG seeks to build its international profile and safeguard its interests, particularly in relations with neighboring countries and global powers.

=== Diplomatic presence in Kurdistan Region ===
Kurdistan Region maintains informal diplomatic ties with several countries through consulates and representative offices located in Erbil. These include offices from countries such as the United States, United Kingdom, Spain, Armenia, Turkey, etc.

=== Kurdistan Region offices overseas ===
The KRG has established representative offices in multiple countries, including major powers like United States, France, Russia and Germany, allowing it to engage in paradiplomatic activities and promote its political and economic agenda internationally. These offices aim to attract foreign investment, coordinate humanitarian assistance, and foster bilateral relations. Despite not having sovereign status, the KRG has built a notable international presence through these diplomatic initiatives.

== See also ==
- Anti-Kurdish sentiment
- Persecution of Kurds
- History of the Kurds
- Kurdish Turkization in Turkey
- Ba'athist Arabization campaigns in northern Iraq
