= The Six Arrows =

Symbol of the Turkish Republican People's Party

Flag of the Republican People's Party

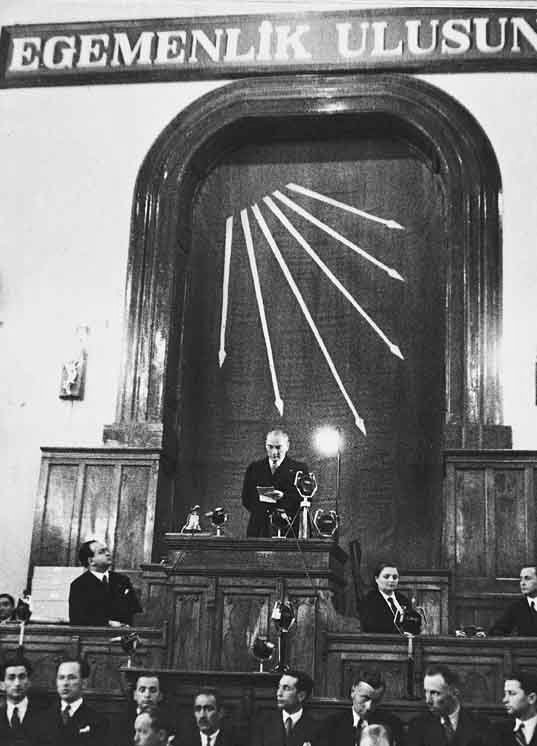
Atatürk's Six Main Principles symbolized by the Six Arrows.

The Six Arrows (Turkish: Altı Ok) is the symbol and flag of the nationalist and syncretic political ideology Kemalism and its associated Turkish Republican People's Party (CHP). The arrows represent the ideology's fundamental pillars. These are republicanism, populism, nationalism, laicism, statism, and reformism. The arrows are believed to have been conceived by İsmail Hakkı Tonguç, a Turkish scientist who made significant contributions to the Turkish education system. The principles of the Six Arrows were added to the Turkish Constitution on 5 February 1937. From August 1938 the flag was hoisted at all official buildings.

== Principles ==
Republicanism (Turkish: Cumhuriyetçilik) is the main idea of the Republican People's Party (CHP) that embraces the sovereignty of the Republic of Turkey, encouraging civic awareness that the sovereignty belongs just to the people. According to the CHP, the idea positions the people above everything and roots of the sovereignty are sourced by the nation.
