= Ali Bulaç =

- Born: 1951 (age 74–75); Mardin, Turkey
- Occupations: Sociologist, Islamic scholar, journalist, writer

Ali Bulaç (born 1951 in Mardin) is a Turkish sociologist, Islamic scholar, journalist and writer.

== Early life and education ==
Bulaç completed his primary and secondary education in Mardin. In 1975, he graduated from the Istanbul Higher Islamic Institute (İstanbul Yüksek İslâm Enstitüsü). In 1980, he received a degree in sociology from the Faculty of Letters at Istanbul University.

== Journalistic career ==
After working for the magazine Hareket, Bulaç founded the magazine Düşünce and the publishing house Düşünce Yayınları in 1976.

Between 1985 and 1992, during the publication of Kitap Dergisi, he also published and edited the quarterly journal Bilgi ve Hikmet.

During the founding period of the newspaper Zaman, he organized the newspaper's Istanbul bureau and served as its head for about one year. He left the newspaper at the end of 1987 after a change in ownership. In 1993–1994 he briefly returned to Zaman, but left again after a short time. In 1998 he resumed writing for the newspaper.

In addition to his work for Zaman, Bulaç's articles and research have appeared in various magazines and newspapers including Millî Gazete and Yeni Şafak.

In 1988 his work İnsanın Özgürlük Arayışı received the Fikir Ödülü (Idea Award) from the Turkish Writers' Union.

He wrote columns for Today's Zaman and Özgün Duruş, and hosted weekly discussion programs on Mehtap TV and Hilal TV. He also lectured at Fatih University and presented the weekly discussion program Konuşmak Lazım on TVNET together with Ekrem Kızıltaş and Cevat Özkaya.

== Arrest and trial ==
Following the investigations related to the Gülen movement after the 2016 Turkish coup attempt, an arrest warrant was issued for Bulaç. On 31 July 2016, he was arrested on charges of “membership in an armed terrorist organization”. After approximately 22 months in detention, he was released on 11 May 2018. In a later trial, he was convicted of “knowingly and willingly aiding a terrorist organization without being a member” and sentenced to 2.5 years in prison.

== Personal life ==
Bulaç is married and has five children.

== Works ==
- İslâm Dünyasında Toplumsal Değişme
- Bir Aydın Sapması
- İnsanın Özgürlük Arayışı
- Din ve Modernizm
- İslam ve Fanatizm
- Modern Ulus Devlet
- İrtica ve Sivilleşme
- Kutsala, Tarihe ve Hayata Dönüş
- Avrupa Birliği ve Türkiye
- Tarih, Toplum ve Gelenek
- Din-Felsefe Vahiy-Akıl İlişkisi (2006)
- Kur'an Meali
- Çağdaş Kavramlar ve Düzenler
- İslâmcılık
- Kutlu Ağaç
- Bilgi Neyi Bilmektir?
- İslâm ve Fundamentalizm
- Ortadoğu'dan İslâm Dünyasına
- Nuh'un Gemisi'ne Binmek
- İslâm Dünyasında Düşünce Sorunları
- İslâm ve Demokrasi
- İslâm Düşüncesinde Din-Felsefe
- Din, Devlet ve Demokrasi
- Din, Kent ve Cemaat
- Modernizm, İrtica ve Sivilleşme
- Göçün ve Kentin Siyaseti: MNP'den SP'ye Millî Görüş Partileri
- Ortadoğu Gerçeği
- Postmodern Kaosta Kıble Arayışı
- Din ve Siyaset
