= Gazeteciler ve Yazarlar Vakfi =

Turkish organization

Gazeteciler ve Yazarlar Vakfi (GYV) translated as Journalists and Writers Foundation is a Turkish organization affiliated with the Islamic scholar Fethullah Gülen The activities of GYV includes sponsoring dialogue platforms for intellectual discussions on national and international matters (such as Abant platform), publishing books on historical and sociological themes by authors of Turkish descent. It was founded in 1994 and is seen as the public mouth piece of Gülen Movement In 2016, BBC reported that the organization paid £115,994 to Edward Garnier for a report "The rule of law in Turkey and Respect for Human Rights" in Turkey.
