= Laicism =

French public secularization movement

Laicism (also laicity, from the Ancient Greek "λαϊκός" "laïkós", meaning "layperson" or "non-cleric") refers to a legal and political model based on the strict separation of religion and state. The French term laïcité was coined in 1871 by French educator and future Nobel Peace Prize laureate Ferdinand Buisson, who advocated for secular education. In some countries, laicism is constitutionally enshrined, while others—primarily Western states—do not explicitly define themselves as laicist but implement varying degrees of separation between religion and government.

== History ==
The term "laicism" arose in France in the 19th century for an anticlerical stance that opposed any ecclesiastical influence on matters of the French state, but not Christianity itself. In 1894, the Dreyfus affair began in France. Domestic political upheavals, latent antisemitism and attempts by clerical-restorationist circles to exert influence led to years of social polarization in the country. In foreign policy, diplomatic relations between France and the Vatican were broken off in 1904. They were not resumed until 1921. Domestically, the 1905 law on the separation of church and state came into effect, which the then deputy and later prime minister Aristide Briand in particular had worked to have passed. This was the first concrete application of the principle created by Buisson. The term laïcité was first used in the 1946 constitution. Its Article 1 reads: La France est une République indivisible, laïque, démocratique et sociale.

Unlike the French model, where the state protects itself from religious influence (primarily Catholicism), the American model of separation aims to protect religious institutions from government interference, often coexisting with strong religious influence in society.

== Constitutionally laicist states ==
- Albania
- Azerbaijan
- Burkina Faso
- China
- Cuba
- Czech Republic
- Ecuador
- France
- Japan
- Kosovo
- Mexico
- Portugal
- São Tomé and Príncipe
- South Korea
- Turkey
- Uruguay

Despite constitutional commitments, the implementation of laicism varies significantly across these nations.

Within the EU, the Czech Republic, France, and Portugal are the only states constitutionally defined as laicist. France's 1905 law created a complete separation of religion and state, particularly targeting the Catholic Church, though other faiths were also affected in the interest of neutrality. However, in Portugal and certain French regions (Alsace and Moselle), concordats with the Catholic Church continue to provide exceptions to full laicist application.

In Turkey, laicism is interpreted as the subordination of religious expression to the state. The government trains Islamic clergy and dictates religious instruction through the Presidency of Religious Affairs (Diyanet).

== By country ==
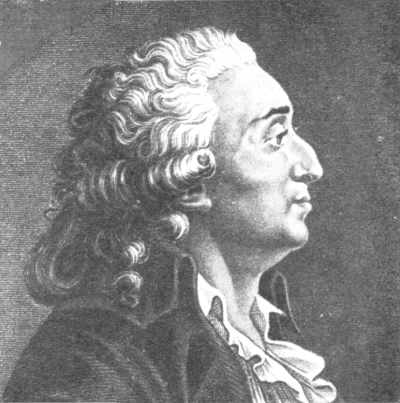
Marquis de Condorcet (1743–1794), Advocate of Secularism in France.

=== France ===
The effects of France's 1905 secular law remain visible today. Two interpretations exist:

- A liberal interpretation defines laicism as institutional separation between state and religion.
- A radical version (laïcard) sees it as prohibiting religious expression in public spaces.

The Catholic Church has never fully accepted ideological laicism but has, since Vatican II, renounced state privileges and the notion of a state religion (abolished in Italy in 1984).

In modern France, laicism is a constitutional ideal. Religion is strictly a private matter; it cannot play a public or governmental role. Religious buildings constructed before 1905 remain state property, though religious communities may use them. Religious groups receive no public funding (with exceptions), though tax exemptions exist. The Alsace-Moselle region retains the Concordat of 1801 due to historical circumstances. In French Guiana, the state still funds Catholic clergy. Chaplaincy services, including military chaplains, are also permitted and since 2005 include Islamic clerics.

French laicism is rigorously enforced. Public schools may not inquire about students' religions. Since 2004, conspicuous religious symbols—like headscarves, kippahs, crosses, turbans, or religious habits—are banned in public schools. Nevertheless, religious broadcasts are aired on national media.

Former President Nicolas Sarkozy proposed a "positive laicism" to integrate religion more openly into public life and combat extremism, drawing criticism from laicist groups.

=== Germany ===
Germany, under Article 137 of the Weimar Constitution, integrated into the current Basic Law (Article 140 GG), does not have a state church. While officially neutral, the state maintains close ties with religious institutions, particularly the Catholic and Protestant churches. These are recognized as public-law corporations and can collect church taxes.

Though Germany is secular, it is not laicist in the French sense. The German model—often described as a cooperation model—balances state neutrality with religious partnership. However, increasing secularization and religious diversity have challenged this system's inclusivity and raised concerns about fair treatment for both religious and non-religious populations.

=== Turkey ===
Inspired by the French model, Turkey, under Mustafa Kemal Atatürk, adopted laicism as a constitutional principle. Initially, the state adopted an aggressively anti-religious stance, banning pilgrimages and religious education (1933–1948). Over time, the state institutionalized control over Islam through the Diyanet, effectively nationalizing religion.

Laicism hardened over the years. Religious symbols, including headscarves, were discouraged in public institutions. In 2008, a constitutional amendment allowed female students to wear headscarves, but it was struck down by the Constitutional Court. In 2010, the ban was permanently lifted by the Higher Education Council.

The balance between state secularism and religious expression has historically been a major source of political tension. For example, in 2008, the Chief Public Prosecutor sought to ban the ruling Justice and Development Party (AKP), a conservative party with roots in political Islam, accusing it of becoming a center for anti-secular activities..

== Secular states and religious traditions ==
The Catholic Church, since the Second Vatican Council (Gaudium et Spes, 1965), has accepted a form of laicity in secular affairs but retains its claim to spiritual authority. Protestant and Orthodox state churches generally reject laicism but may accept it under the theological principle of obedience to secular authority (Romans 13:1). Evangelical free churches, which have historically rejected state churches, support religious freedom and often embrace secular governance.

== See also ==
- Quebec Laicism
- Laicization
- Jewish rationalism
- Sharia
- Secularism
  - Secularism in France
  - Secularism in Turkey
- Theocracy
- Hierotopy
