= Murat Belge =

Turkish academic, translator, writer, and civil rights activist (born 1943)

- Born: 16 March 1943 (age 83); Ankara, Turkey
- Education: English High School for Boys; Istanbul University
- Employer: Istanbul Bilgi University
- Spouse(s): Taciser Ulaş (div. 1997) Hale Soygazi (m. 2006)
- Parent: Burhan Asaf Belge (father)
- Relatives: Yakup Kadri Karaosmanoğlu (uncle)

Murat Belge (born 16 March 1943) is a Turkish academic, translator, literary critic, columnist, civil rights activist, and occasional tour guide.

== Early life ==
Belge is the son of political journalist Burhan Asaf Belge (who was married to Hungarian-American socialite Zsa Zsa Gabor from May 1935 to December 1941), nephew of Yakup Kadri Karaosmanoğlu, and the grandson of a former governor of Bursa. He received his Ph.D. from Istanbul University in 1969 on leftist criticism in English literature. From his student years in the 1960s, until the early 1980s, he had been an active participant of a close-knit left-wing group of scholars at Istanbul University's Department of English Language and Literature; he used to be a Marxist himself. His fellow scholars of those years included Berna Moran, Mîna Urgan, Cevat Çapan, Akşit Göktürk and Vahit Turhan. After the military coups of 1971 and 1980, he was compelled to leave academic life and began publishing left-wing classics with İletişim Press in Istanbul.

== Career ==
Belge was a member of the organizing committee for a two-day academic conference that started on 24 September 2005, held at Istanbul Bilgi University in Istanbul, titled "Ottoman Armenians During the Decline of the Empire: Issues of Scientific Responsibility and Democracy". The conference offered an open dispute of the official Turkish account of the Armenian genocide, and was denounced by nationalists as treacherous.

This is a fight of 'can we discuss this thing, or can we not discuss this thing?'…This is something that's directly related to the question of what kind of country Turkey is going to be.

— Belge, during the conference opening.

Belge's remarks led to his facing a ten-year jail sentence for criticizing the judicial ban; he was acquitted. He also commented, "We have a very unhealthy relation with our history … It's basically a collection of lies."

A leaked Turkish military memo, dated November 2006 (reported by Nokta in March 2007, prior to being shut down), lists journalist deemed "trustworthy" and "untrustworthy" by the Turkish Armed Forces. Murat Belge was listed as "untrustworthy."

Since 1996, he has been a professor of comparative literature at Istanbul Bilgi University.

== Personal life ==
Since the early 1980s, he has been guiding tours of Istanbul's yalılar (waterfront mansions). He is married to actress Hale Soygazi.

== Writing ==
Belge is one of the founders of Birikim, a leftist cultural magazine. In 1984 he also established another publication, Yeni Gündem. For several years he wrote columns for the daily Radikal, before shifting to Taraf in June 2008. On 14 December 2012, Belge stepped down from his post at Taraf together with editor-in-chief Ahmet Altan, assistant editor Yasemin Çongar and columnist Neşe Tüzel, and he has written occasionally for openDemocracy since 2001.

Belge has translated works of James Joyce, Charles Dickens, D. H. Lawrence, William Faulkner and John Berger into Turkish. He is an active member of the Helsinki Citizens Assembly.
