= Sovereignty unconditionally belongs to the Nation =

Founding principle of the Republic of Turkey

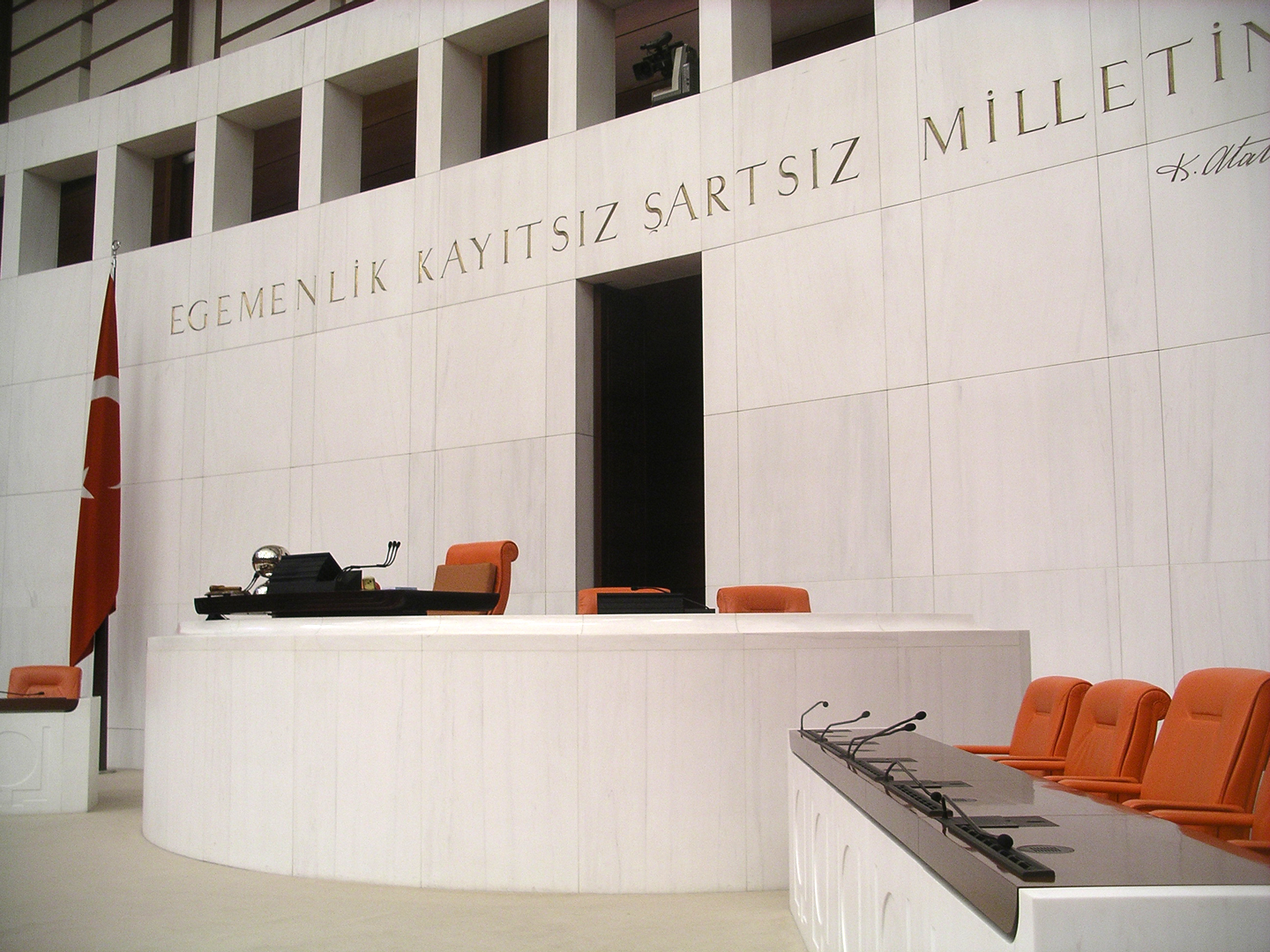
"Egemenlik kayıtsız şartsız Milletindir" is written on the wall of the General Assembly Hall in the Grand National Assembly of Turkey

Sovereignty unconditionally belongs to the Nation (Turkish: Egemenlik kayıtsız şartsız Milletindir; Ottoman Turkish: حاكميّت بلاقيد و شرط ملّتڭدر, romanized: Ḥâkimiyet bilâ ḳaydü şarṭ milletiñdir) is the founding principle of the Republic of Turkey. This principle is written on the wall behind the chairman of the General Assembly Hall in the Grand National Assembly.

Anybody, any clan, any denomination or any group should not have directly power of order in the community. The Nation has unique source and one owner for superior power of order itself.

The first letter in the word "Milletindir" (People of the Nation) is written with a capital letter, as it refers to the "Turkish Nation".

The phrase has been used by some Turkish newspapers in the aftermath of the 2016 Turkish coup attempt.

== Chronology ==
- 23 April 1920 - For the parliament's first meeting, Şerif Bey talked about sovereignty and freedom in his opening speech.
- 20 January 1921 - It was in the first article of the 1921 constitution.

Sovereignty belongs to nation without any reservation or condition.

Original:

Hâkimiyet bilâ kaydü şart milletindir. İdare usulü halkın mukadderatını bizzat ve bilfiil idare etmesi esasına müstenittir.

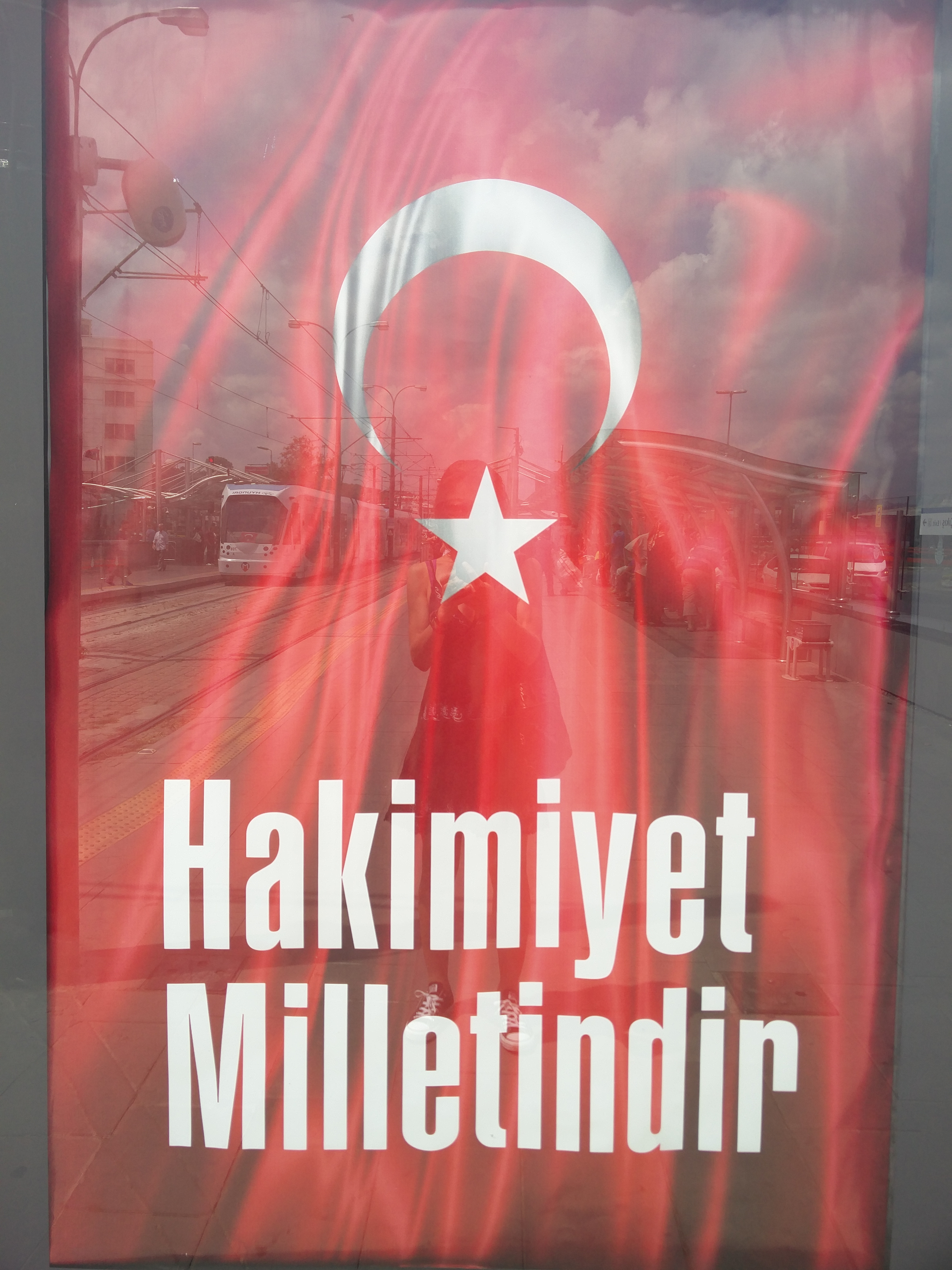
Istanbul billboard showing the slogan in July 2016. These were installed at tram stops and billboards all over the city following the attempted coup.

- 20 April 1924 - It was in third article of the 1924 constitution;

Article 3- Sovereignty belongs to nation without any reservation or condition.

Original:

Madde 3- Hâkimiyet bilâ kaydü şart Milletindir.

- 10 January 1945 - Hakimiyet bila kaydü şart Milletindir is changed to Egemenlik kayıtsız şartsız Milletindir.

The sentence has the same meaning, rephrased in accordance to the language reform.

- 9 July 1961 - It was in fourth article in the 1961 constitution.

Article 4- Sovereignty is vested in the nation without any reservation or condition. The Nation shall exercise its sovereignty through the authorised agencies as prescribed by the principles laid down in the Constitution. The right to exercise sovereignty shall not be delegated to any individual, group or class. No person or agency shall exercise any state authority which does not drive its origin from the Constitution.

Original:

Madde 4- Egemenlik kayıtsız şartsız Türk Milletinindir. Millet, egemenliğini, Anayasanın koyduğu esaslara göre, yetkili organlar eliyle kullanır. Egemenliğin kullanılması, hiçbir suretle belli bir kişiye, zümreye veya sınıfa bırakılamaz. Hiçbir kimse veya organ, kaynağını Anayasadan almayan bir devlet yetkisi kullanamaz.

- 18 October 1982 - It is in sixth article in the 1982 constitution.

Article 6- Sovereignty belongs to the Nation without any restriction or condition. The Turkish Nation shall exercise its sovereignty through the authorized organs, as prescribed by the principles set forth in the Constitution. The exercise of sovereignty shall not be delegated by any means to any individual, group or class. No person or organ shall exercise any state authority that does not emanate from the Constitution.

Original:

Madde 6- "Egemenlik, kayıtsız şartsız Milletindir. Türk Milleti, egemenliğini, Anayasanın koyduğu esaslara göre, yetkili organları eliyle kullanır. Egemenliğin kullanılması, hiçbir surette hiçbir kişiye, zümreye veya sınıfa bırakılamaz. Hiçbir kimse veya organ kaynağını anayasadan almayan bir Devlet yetkisi kullanamaz."

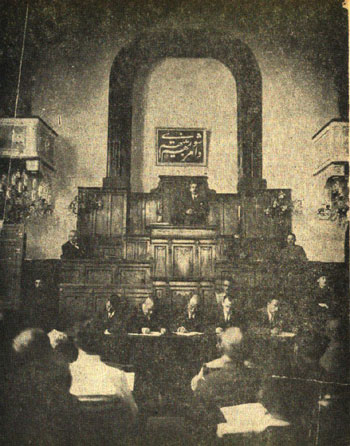
وَأَمْرُهُمْ شُورَى بَيْنَهُمْ وَمِمَّا رَزَقْنَاهُمْ يُنفِقُونَ "wa amru-hum shura baina hum", “They perform their affairs by mutual consultation” (Quran, Ash-Shura, 38). This calligraphy was placed during the preparation of the first Turkish Parliament building in Ankara.

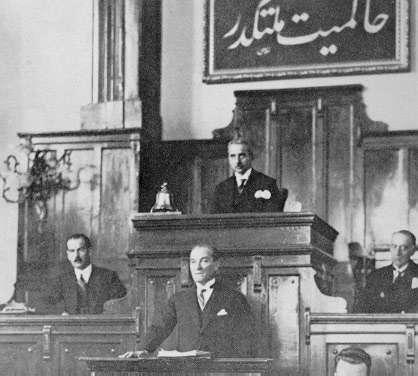
“Hakimiyet Milletindir” (lit. "Sovereignty belongs to nation") calligraphy was written by Mehmed Hulusi Yazgan in Ottoman Turkish script. This calligraphy is shortest style of the phrase in law.

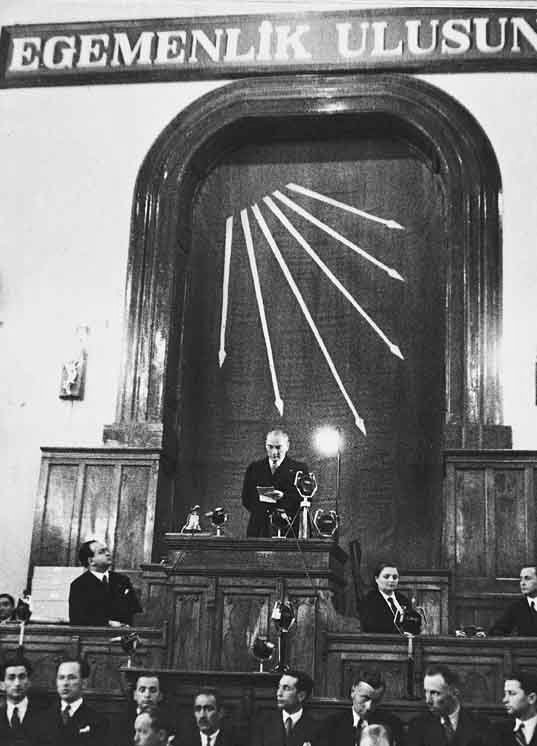
“Hakimiyet Milletindir” was changed to “Egemenlik Ulusundur” after the new alphabet law and modern Turkish language reform. The sentence has the same meaning, but is expressed with words of native Turkish origin.
