= Turkification of Kurds =

State-led assimilation policies targeting Kurdish identity and culture

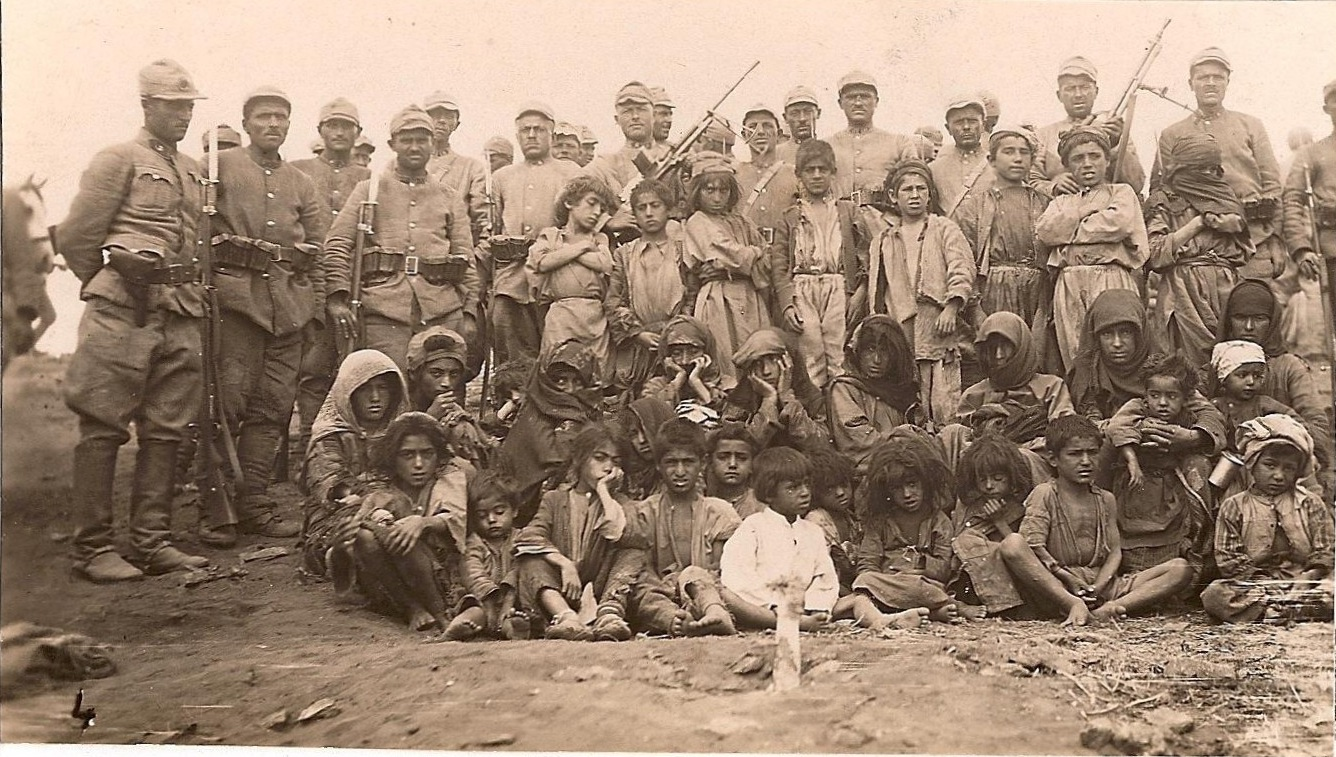
Turkish soldiers and local people of Dersim region. They were exiled to other parts of Turkey, 1938.

Turkification of Kurds refers to a series of state-sponsored policies aimed at assimilating the Kurdish population into a unified Turkish national identity. These efforts have been ongoing since the founding of the Republic of Turkey in 1923.

Rooted in the late transformations of the Ottoman Empire and shaped by the rise of 20th-century Turkish nationalism, these policies have targeted the suppression of Kurdish language, cultural expression, and ethnic identity in order to promote Turkish linguistic and cultural hegemony.

== Background and history ==
The history of Turkization of the Kurdish population in Turkey and Turkish Kurdistan can be traced back to the fall of the multiethnic Ottoman Empire and the rise of the modern Turkish nation-state. The shift began with the emergence of the Young Turks and became more intense after the Republic was founded in 1923. From the beginning, the new state pursued a nationalist project focused on creating a unified Turkish identity. This transformation was led by Mustafa Kemal Atatürk, whose vision for the Republic aimed to define the country as exclusively Turkish, sidelining other ethnic identities, especially Kurdishness.

Over the years, this vision led to policies aimed at suppressing Kurdish culture and identity. These included banning the use of the Kurdish language, renaming Kurdish villages, and limiting Kurdish political participation. For a population of an estimated 15–20 million Kurds, these policies have had a deep and lasting impact—fueling the rise of Kurdish nationalism and contributing to continued social and political tensions in the country.

The Treaty of Lausanne (1923), which confirmed Turkish sovereignty, did not grant any minority rights to the Kurds. This allowed the state to implement policies that undermined Kurdish language and cultural expressions. As part of this approach, the Kurdish language was banned in public spaces, Kurdish families were relocated, and Kurdish uprisings—such as the Sheikh Said rebellion (1925) and the Dersim rebellion (1937–1938)—were met with harsh military suppression. These actions reflected a broader policy of ethnic homogenization, where the state viewed visible Kurdish identity as a threat to national unity.

Until 1991, the government officially denied the existence of Kurds, instead referring to them as "Mountain Turks" in an attempt to erase their identity.

In the early 2000s, there were attempts to reform these policies, including the so-called Kurdish Opening. However, these initiatives were limited in scope and did not bring about lasting change. The cycle of state repression and Kurdish resistance continued, marked by clashes between Kurdish political movements—especially the Kurdistan Workers' Party (PKK)—and Turkish authorities. Discrimination, armed conflict, and political crackdowns remain key features of the state's approach to Kurdish demands for rights and recognition.

== Policies of Turkization ==
The Turkish Constitution designates Turkish as the only language of instruction. Article 42.9 prohibits the teaching of any other language to Turkish citizens, effectively banning the use of the Kurdish language in schools and public institutions. The Turkish Language Association (TDK) led efforts to "purify" the language by removing non-Turkish elements. Education in Kurdish remains heavily restricted and often politicized.

Turkey does not recognize Kurds as a minority under the terms of the Treaty of Lausanne, which limits their cultural and political rights. Many Kurds report facing discrimination and marginalization in daily life.

Turkization policies have also included the renaming of Kurdish villages.

Despite systemic obstacles, many Kurds in Turkey continue to preserve their ethnic identity and cultural traditions.

== See also ==
- Serhildan
- Kurdish rebellions during World War I
- Early Kurdish nationalism
- Dersim massacre
- Deportations of Kurds (1916–1934)
- Kurdish villages depopulated by Turkey
- Denial of Kurds by Turkey
