= La Turquie Kemaliste =

Kemalist propaganda magazine

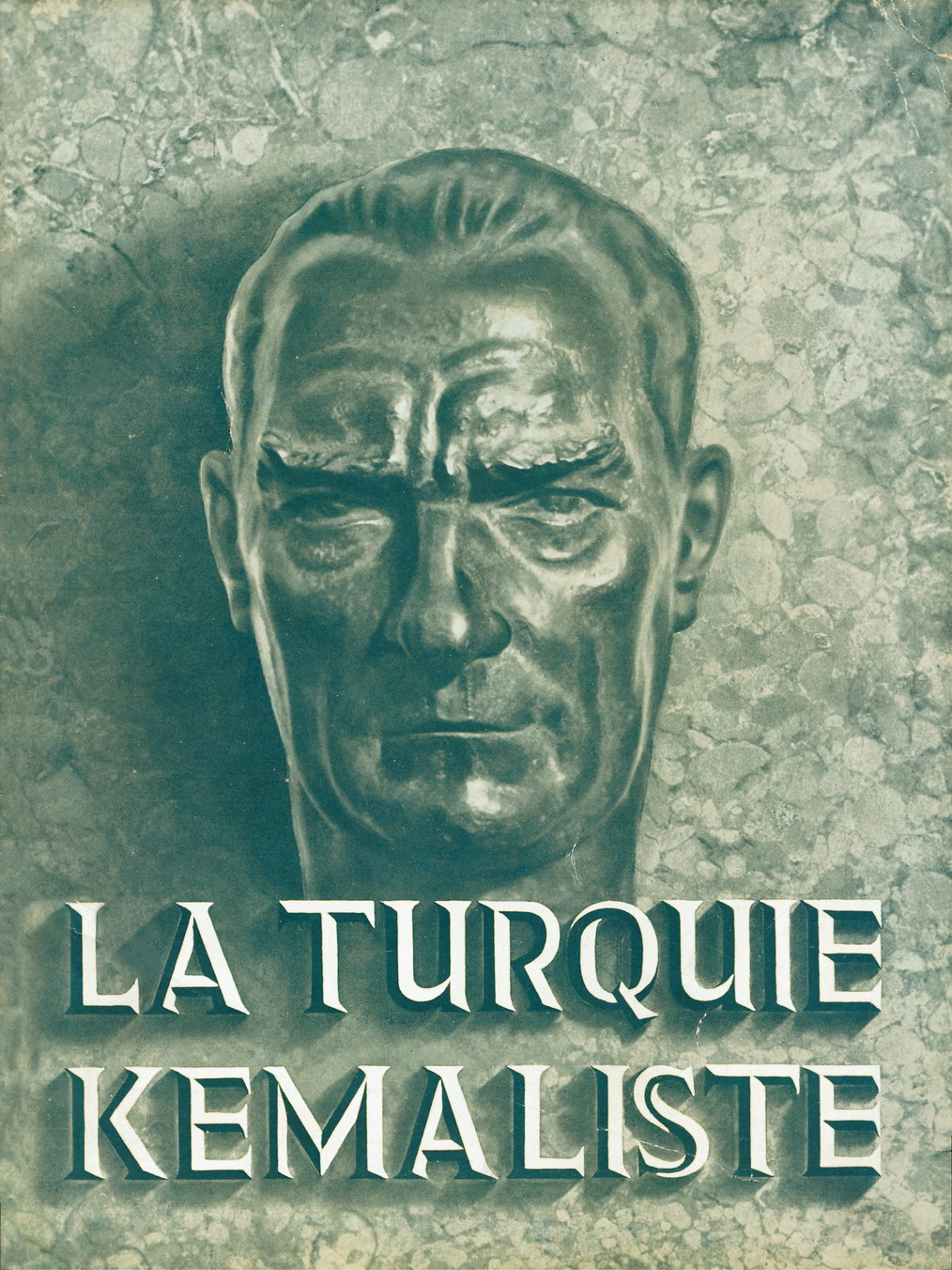
- Covers following the death of Mustafa Kemal Atatürk featured a bust of him.
- Editor-in-Chief: Vedat Nedim Tör
- Categories: Politics, Economics, History, Arts, Architecture, Archeology
- Frequency: Trimonthly
- Total circulation: 116,690 (as of 1938)
- First issue: 1933
- Final issue: 1949
- Country: Turkey
- Language: French, English, German

The La Turquie Kemaliste (French for "Kemalist Turkey", Turkish: Kemalist Türkiye) was a propaganda magazine published by the Turkish government between 1933 and 1949. It is regarded as one of the first public diplomacy campaigns since the foundation of the republic.

The magazine intended to promote Turkey into European audiences in an attempt to attract tourism and increase the awareness regarding the recent Turkish Revolution. It was mostly printed in French, though some parts were also available in English and German.

== Background ==
In 1933, the Press and Intelligence Directorate under the Ministry of Foreign Affairs, which was responsible for propaganda warfare during the Turkish War of Independence, was restructured into the Ministry of Interior as a part of the efforts to shift the founding cadres into civil service. Vedat Nedim Tör, who was later to become the editor-in-chief, was appointed the director. As the directorate was intended for war-time use and the regime was struggling with the recovery from the Great Depression, it maintained only two full-time staff and thus its budget was paper-thin.

The proposal for the magazine was first brought to Şükrü Kaya, the Minister of Interior, by Vedat Nedim Tör, who remarked that there was a "strong" need for a body that would promote the Turkish culture, art and the revolutionary movement. The response from the Prime Minister İsmet İnönü was hesitant ─ he was afraid that they did not have the technical infrastructure for an international magazine.

== History ==
Following appraisal by the Turkish government, Vedat Nedim Tör's proposal was accepted. The directorate was then allocated 20 full-time staff for a trial issue. The same year, the Ministry of Interior asked all civil administrations to deliver "artistic pictures" of remarkable buildings and natural wonders. However, the outcome lacked the standards desired by the government. Tör then held a photography competition, of which was won by Othmar Pferschy, who had to close his personal photography business and was about to leave the country for Alexandria. Though Pferschy at the beginning hesitated about relocating to Ankara, from Istanbul, he eventually acceded to the offer, following prolonged conversations with Vedat Nedim Tör to appeal him ─ the pay offered to Pferschy doubled Tör's salary.

Enjoying the opportunities provided by the Turkish government, Pferschy toured all over the country, eventually taking about 16,000 photos. Meanwhile, Tör reached out to prominent Turkish authors and experts to hire them into the team for the trial issue. Şevket Süreyya Aydemir, Yakup Kadri Karaosmanoğlu, Burhan Asaf Belge, Necip Fazıl Kısakürek, İsmail Hakkı Baltacıoğlu, Reşit Galip and Afet İnan were among the contributors. Fleeing the Nazi persecution and housed by the Turkish government, many Jewish scholars also took part as authors and translators in the magazine: Ernst Reuter, Gunnar Jarring, Ernest Mamboury, Thomas Whittemore.

Shortly after the completion of the trial issue, it was brought in to İsmet İnönü, who was astonished by its quality and green-lit the magazine for circulation. From 1933 to 1938, over 116,690 copies were distributed all over Europe. The magazine was dominated by French, yet the later issues also had sections in English and German. The magazine often corresponded news from Turkey, essentially regarding the radical revolutions, and also evaluated the geopolitics. Apparent on almost all issues, Ankara Construit was a permanent feature of the magazine. It featured many photos from Ankara, Turkey's new capital under construction. It was released on a trimonthly basis, though the conditions within World War II stranded the editorial process, decreasing its frequency to less than yearly. The magazine was then eventually abandoned in 1949.

== Legacy ==
A full collection of La Turquie Kemaliste is preserved at the Library of Turkish Historical Society.

== Gallery ==
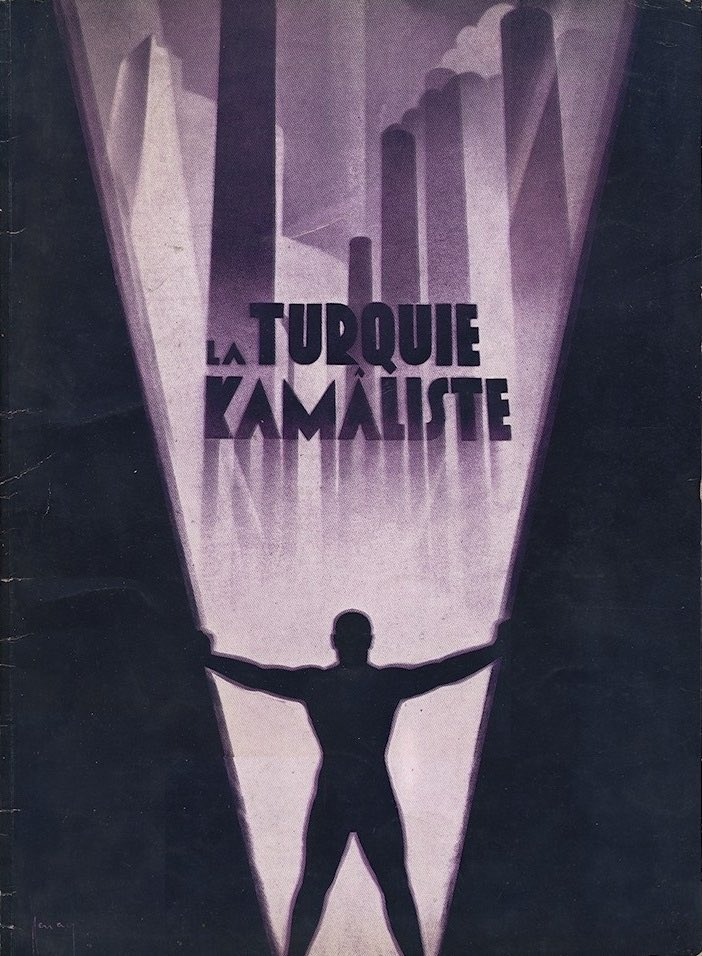
It was titled La Turquie Kamâliste for a short time span.

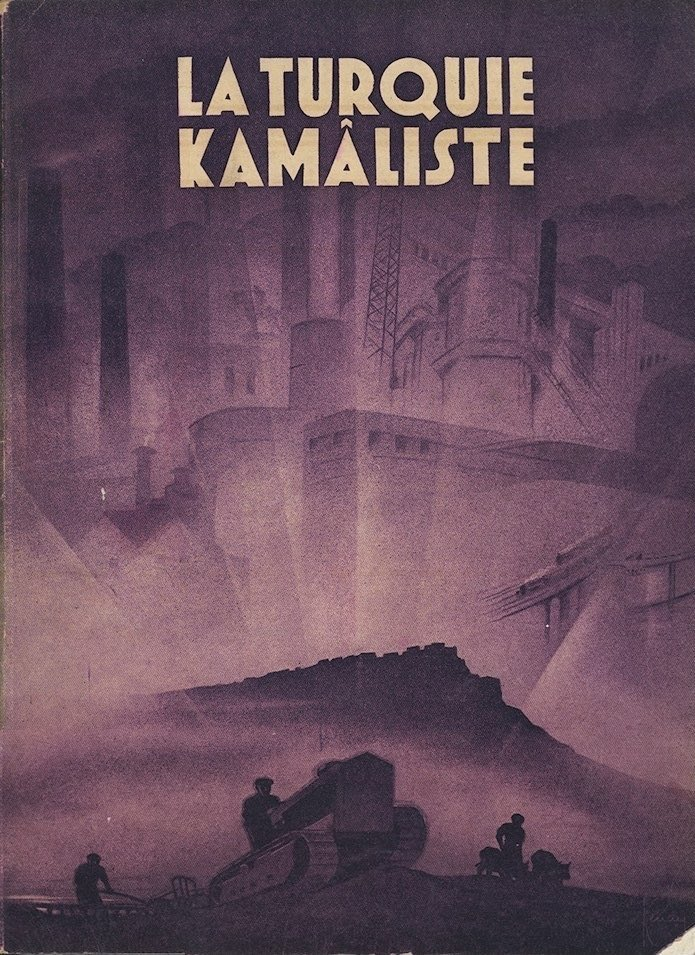
Covers of the magazine often emphasized the industrialization of Turkey.

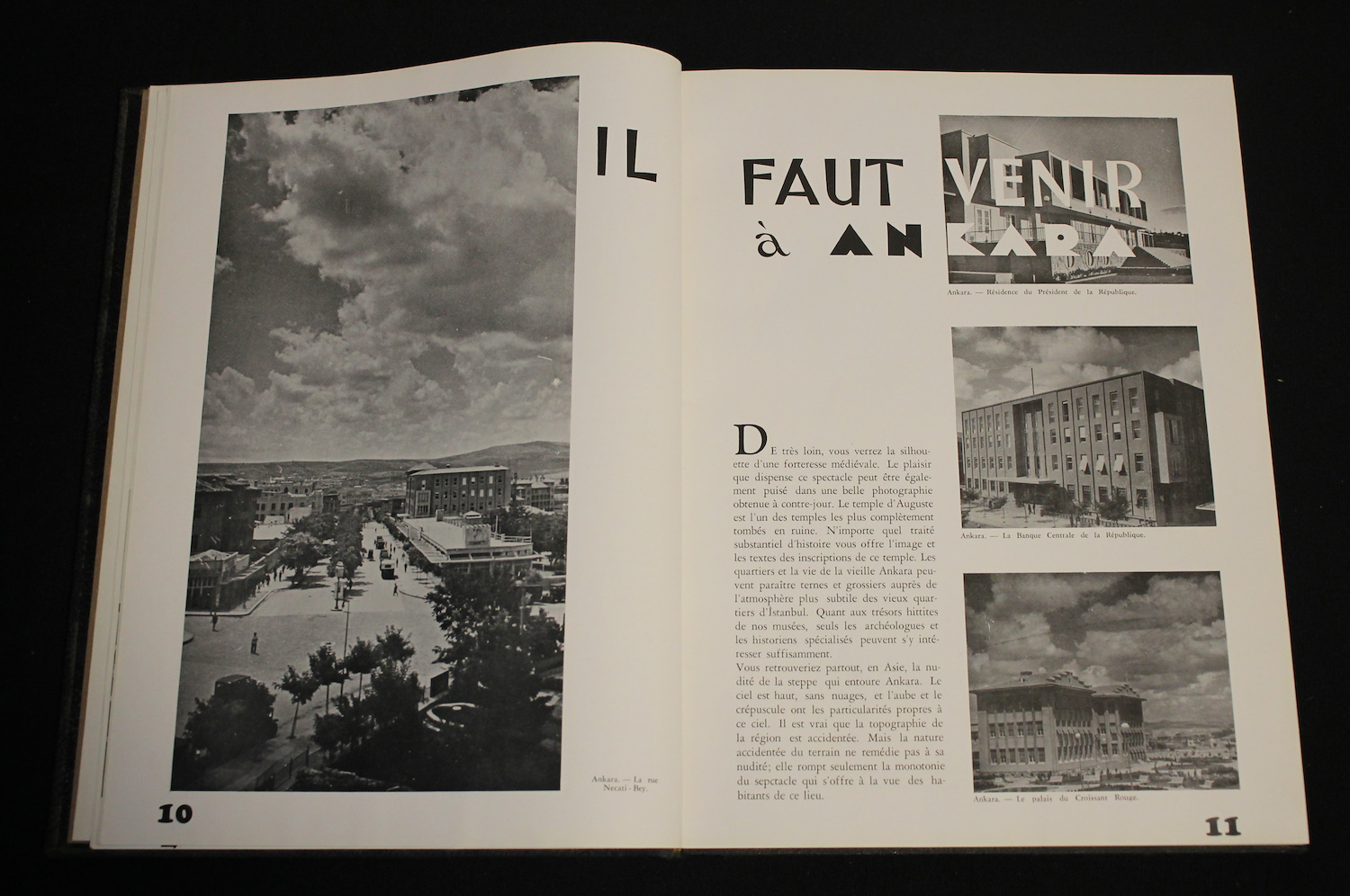
A page of La Turquie Kemaliste promoting Ankara.

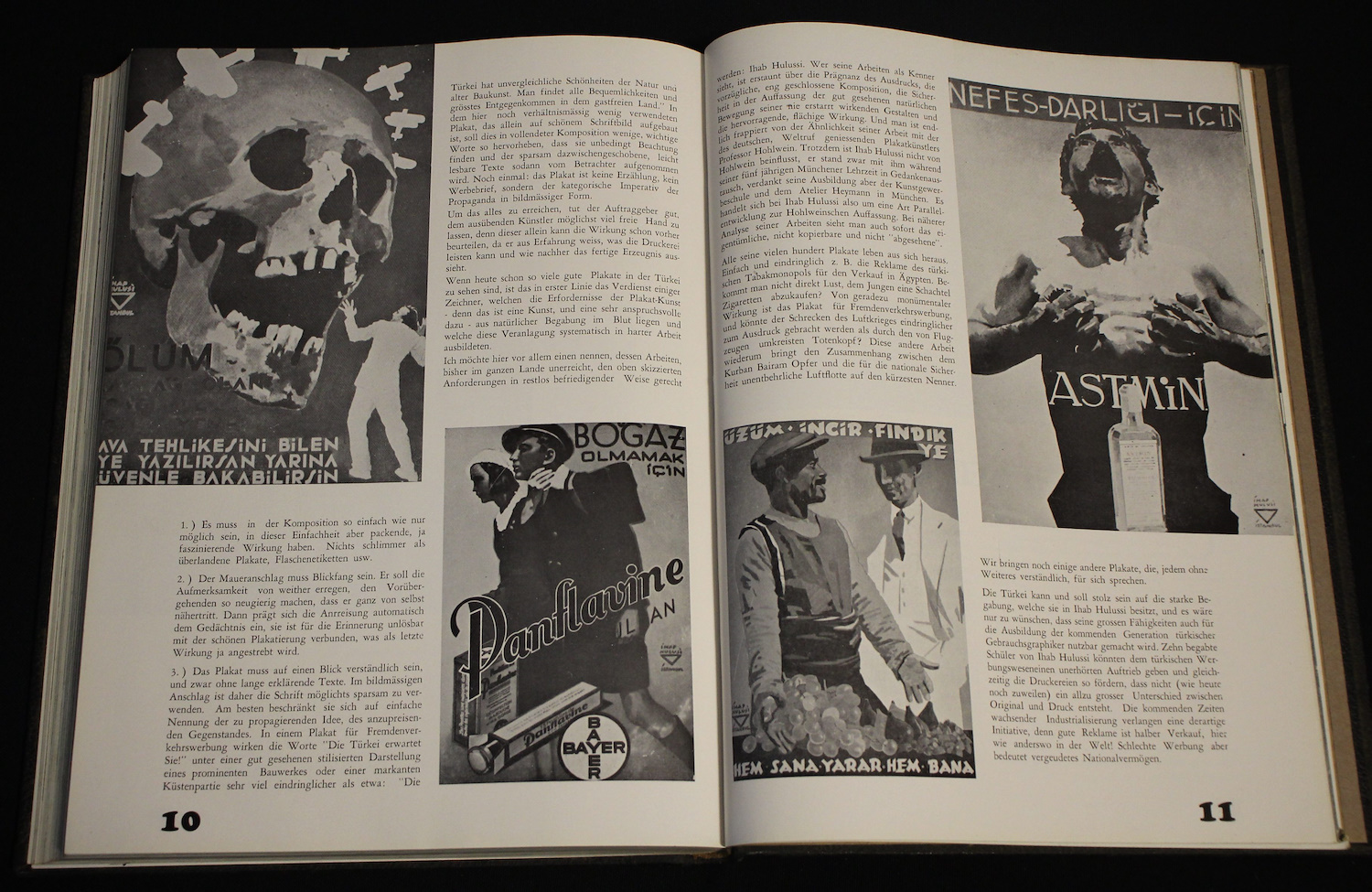
La Turquie Kemaliste also advertised the companies in Turkey.

== See also ==
- Kadro
- Kemalism
- Atatürk's reforms
