= Left Kemalism =

Left Kemalism is a political and ideological movement in Turkey that synthesizes the principles of Mustafa Kemal Atatürk with left-wing, Marxist, or socialist politics, viewing the republican-era modernization and the Turkish War of Independence as a revolutionary, anti-imperialist progression. This ideology, which exerted a major influence on Turkish political life particularly during the 1960s, aimed to rescue Turkey from underdevelopment through a statist-developmentist approach and via a "non-capitalist path" (typically through a form of socialist-nationalism.)

== Historical development ==
=== Kadro ===
The intellectual foundations of left Kemalism are traced back to the intellectuals who coalesced around the journal Kadro, published between 1932 and 1934 (the Kadro Movement). Spearheaded by figures such as Şevket Süreyya Aydemir, Yakup Kadri Karaosmanoğlu, İsmail Hüsrev and Vedat Nedim Tör, this movement argued that the primary contradiction in the world was not between social classes (the bourgeoisie and the proletariat), but rather between exploiting imperialist countries and exploited, semi-colonial nations. In order to deepen the Atatürk revolutions, the Kadro group envisioned the creation of an industrialized yet classless society, led by a conscious cadre of intellectuals and an apparatus of state "independent of classes." This "escape from class" and the emphasis placed on an intellectual vanguard formed the bedrock of left Kemalist movements in the decades that followed.

=== Yön ===
The actual shaping of the movement took place in the relatively permissive political environment that emerged following the May 27, 1960 Coup. The journal Yön, which began publication in 1961 under the leadership of Doğan Avcıoğlu, became the largest organ of left Kemalism and brought together the left-leaning intellectuals of the period. In the Yön manifesto and throughout the journal's general editorial line, Kemalism was reinterpreted not merely as a past historical event, but as a progressive, anti-feudal, and continuous ideology of development. During the same period, thinkers like Niyazi Berkes explicitly characterized Atatürk as a "revolutionary" and explained the Republican reforms as an anti-imperialist social revolution aligned with the goal of modernization.

== Ideology ==
The foundational theoretical framework of left Kemalism is centered around several main pillars:

=== Anti-Imperialism and Third Worldism ===
According to left Kemalist thought, for an underdeveloped country to reach the level of Western civilization, it must completely sever its economic and political ties with Western imperialism. The 1919-1922 National Struggle led by Atatürk is viewed as the first and most successful anti-imperialist war of national liberation in world history, and is accepted as a model for Third World countries (particularly the Arab socialist regimes of the 1960s).

=== Neo-Statism and developmentism ===
Rejecting the free-market economy based on the argument that the capitalist system colonizes underdeveloped countries, left Kemalists put forward the concept of "neo-statism." Looking out for the benefit of the entire society—excluding feudal landlords and the comprador bourgeoisie—this model mandates state ownership, heavy industrialization, and rigid centralized planning. Within this movement, socialism was adopted as a shortcut "method for rapid development" rather than a dictatorship of the proletariat.

=== Dynamic forces and the military-civilian intellectual vanguard ===
Unlike orthodox Marxism, left Kemalists argue that in countries like Turkey that have not completed their industrialization, a powerful and conscious working class capable of carrying out a revolution has not yet emerged. For this reason, social transformation and enlightenment must be achieved through top-down state intervention (National Democratic Revolution), led by the "dynamic forces" (zinde güçler)—namely military officers, bureaucrats, teachers, university students, and civilian intellectuals.

== See also ==
- Kemalism
- Liberal Kemalism
- Islamokemalism
- Post-Kemalism
- The Six Arrows
