= 1927 Detentions =

The 1927 Detentions were widespread arrests made in the autumn of 1927 against members of the Communist Party of Turkey operating undercover in Turkey. After Vedat Nedim Tör, the General Secretary of the TKP Central Committee of the time, handed over the secret party documents and membership lists to the police, a major arrest was made, which included Şefik Hüsnü, who was in charge of the Comintern in Turkey at that time, and the members of the TKP Central Committee, and the 1928 TKP Case was opened. During these arrests, Şevket Süreyya Aydemir, a member of the Central Committee, acted together with Vedat Nedim Tör and later started the Kadro magazine.

== Background ==
During this period, TKP tried to heal the wounds of the murder of many Central Committee members in January 1921 in Trabzon, on their way to Ankara from the founding congress in Baku, together with the party chairman, Mustafa Suphi. It was organized in Istanbul, Ankara and other provinces, and took part in various actions, especially the 1927 Adana Railway Strike. However, due to the changing decisions of the Comintern administration, in which the Communist Party of the Soviet Union played a decisive role, regarding the attitude towards Kemalism, the divisions that emerged in the party partially due to this, and the increasing pressure against all kinds of opposition movements in the country after the declaration of "Takrir-i Sükun" has been in a difficult situation.

== Arrests ==
Many communists, including senior party leaders, were caught in the arrests:

- Şefik Hüsnü was sentenced to 3 months in prison.
- Vedat Nedim Tör acquitted
- Şevket Süreyya Aydemir acquitted
- Nâzım Hikmet was sentenced to 3 months in absentia for being abroad
- Hikmet Kıvılcımlı was sentenced to 3 months in prison
