= Necip Fazıl Kısakürek =

Turkish poet, novelist, playwright, Islamist ideologue (1904–1983)

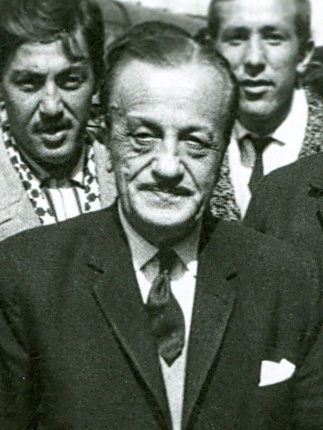
- Necip Fazıl in the 1950s
- Born: Ahmed Necib; May 26, 1904; Istanbul, Ottoman Empire
- Died: May 25, 1983 (aged 78); Istanbul, Turkey
- Spouse: Neslihan Kısakürek
- Children: 5 (b. 1943)

Philosophical work
- Era: 20th-century philosophy
- Region: Islamic philosophy
- School: Sufism
- Main interests: Poetry, politics, literature
- Notable ideas: Founder of Büyük Doğu

Ahmet Necip Fazıl Kısakürek (May 26, 1904 – May 25, 1983) was a Turkish poet, novelist, playwright, Islamist ideologue, and conspiracy theorist. He is also known simply by his initials NFK. He was noticed by the French philosopher Henri Bergson, who later became his teacher.

== Biography ==
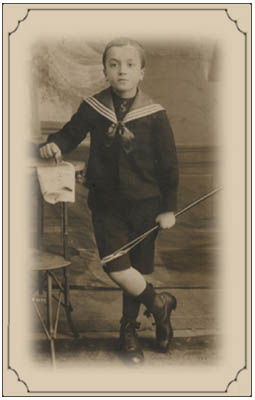
Necip Fazıl in 1916

In his own words, he was born in "a huge mansion in Çemberlitaş, on one of the streets descending towards Sultanahmet" in 1904. His father was Abdülbaki Fazıl Bey, who held several posts, including deputy judge in Bursa, public prosecutor in Gebze and finally, judge in Kadıköy. His mother was an emigree from Crete. He was raised at the Çemberlitaş mansion of his paternal grandfather, Kısakürekzade Mehmed Hilmi Efendi of Maraş; he was named after his great-grandfather, Ahmed Necib, as well as his father, Fazıl.

He studied in many schools during his primary education, including the French School in Gedikpaşa, Robert College of Istanbul, as well as the Naval School. He received religious courses from Ahmed Hamdi of Akseki and science courses from Yahya Kemal at the Naval School, but he was actually influenced by İbrahim Aşkî, whom he defined to have "penetrated deep and private areas in many inner and outer sciences from literature and philosophy to mathematics and physics". İbrahim Aşkî provided his first contact with Sufism even at a "plan of skin over skin". "After completing candidate and combat classes" of Naval School, Kısakürek entered the Philosophy Department of Darülfünûn and graduated from there (1921–1924). One of his closest friends in philosophy was Hasan Ali Yücel.

He studied in Paris for one year with the scholarship provided by the Ministry of National Education (1924–1925), until the scholarship was cancelled. After returning home in 1926, he worked at Holland, Osmanlı and İş Banks (1926–1939), and gave lectures at the Faculty of Linguistics and History and Geography and the State Conservatoire in Ankara and the Academy of Fine Arts in İstanbul (1939–1942). Having established a relation with the press in his youth, Kısakürek quit civil service to earn his living from writing and magazines.

Necip Fazıl's life took a turn in 1934, when he met Abdülhakim Arvasi, a sheik of the Sufi Naqshbandi order. He became one of his most notable disciples, remaining a follower until the sheik died in 1943.

Appropriating his anti-semitic ideas from Europe, Kısakürek regarded Jews as the corrupting element within Western civilization, and described them as the originators of Marxism and capitalism. He held them responsible for the early conflicts between Muslims and the decline of the Ottoman Empire. Kısakürek's publications included the Turkish translation of The Protocols of the Elders of Zion and praise for Henry Ford's The International Jew, as well as a political program in which he wrote: “Chief among these treacherous and insidious elements to be cleansed are the Dönmes and the Jews." Necip Fazıl was awarded the First Prize of C.H.P. Play Contest in 1947 with his play Sabır Taşı (Stone of Patience). Kısakürek was awarded the titles of "Great Cultural Gift" by the Ministry of Culture (25 May 1980) and "Greatest Living Poet of Turkish" by the Foundation of Turkish Literature upon the 75th anniversary of his birth.

Necip Fazıl Kısakürek died on 25 May 1983 in his house at Erenköy after an illness that "lasted long but did not impair his intellectual activity and writing" and was buried in the graveyard at the Eyüp Cemetery on the ridge of Eyüp after an eventful funeral.

== Islamist nationalist ideology ==
Kısakürek sought to replace the Kemalist secular notion of nationalism with an Islamist one with less emphasis on nationalism. Within Turkish Islamism, he represented the concept of "Islamization from above" through the capture of government.

Since the late 1970s, Kısakürek has been an icon for Turkish Islamists. Many cadres of the Justice and Development Party (AKP) have been inspired by his rhetoric, including Recep Tayyip Erdoğan, who met Kısakürek while still a student and attended his funeral at the start of his political career.

== Literary career ==
In his own words, having "learned to read and to write from his grandfather in very young ages", Kısakürek became "crazy about limitless, trivia reading" until the age of twelve starting from "groups of sentences belonging to lower class writers of the French" Having been involved in literature with such a reading passion, Necip Fazıl states that his "poetry started at the age of twelve" and that his mother said "how much I would like you to be a poet" by showing the "poetry notebook of a girl with tuberculosis" lying on the bed next to his mother's bed when he went to visit her staying at the hospital, and adds: "My mother's wish appeared to me as something that I fed inside but I was not aware of until twelve. The motive of existence itself. I decided inside with my eyes on the snow hurling on the window of the hospital room and the wind howling; I will be a poet! And I became".

The first published poem of Necip Fazıl is "Kitabe", a poem that was later included in his book Örümcek Ağı (Spider Web) with the title "Bir Mezar Taşı"(A Gravestone); it was also published in the Yeni Mecmua (New Magazine) dated 1 July 1923.

By 1939, his poems and articles were appearing in magazines such as Yeni Mecmua, Milli Mecmua, Anadolu, Hayat and Varlık, and Cumhuriyet newspaper.

After returning home from Paris in 1925, Necip Fazıl stayed in Ankara intermittently. On his third visit, he published a magazine called Ağaç on 14 March 1936 by providing the support of some banks. Ağaç, the writers of which included Ahmet Hamdi Tanpınar, Ahmet Kutsi Tecer and Mustafa Şekip Tunç, decided to follow a spiritualist and idealist line in contrary to the materialist and Marxist ideas supported by the writers such as Burhan Belge, Vedat Nedim Tör, Şevket Süreyya Aydemir and İsmail Hüsrev Tökin of the closed Kadro magazine owned by Yakup Kadri and which greatly influenced the intellectuals of the time. Kısakürek later transferred to Ağaç (Turkish: Tree) magazine published in six volumes in Ankara to İstanbul; however, unable to establish a viable reader base, the magazine was closed at the 17th volume. Necip Fazıl was among the contributors of the conservative magazine entitled Serdengeçti.

Necip Fazıl next began to publish the magazine called Büyük Doğu (Turkish: Great East). Starting in 1943, the magazine was published intermittently as weekly, daily and monthly. In 1978, he was prosecuted because of his controversial articles and publications and the magazine was forced to close. Necip Fazıl also published a political humor magazine called Borazan (Bugle), of which only three volumes were published.

In 1971, Kısakürek began to publish "reports" about things happening in those days. Later on, he published them as a series called "Reports" numbered by their chronological. There are 10 of those reports and "Report 9" is the most known one, cause of contains writings against Erbakan and his "Milli Görüş" movement.

== Bibliography ==
=== Poetry ===
- Örümcek Ağı (1925) (Spider Web)
- Kaldırımlar (1928) (Pavements)
- Ben ve Ötesi (1932) (Me and Beyond)
- Sonsuzluk Kervanı (1955) (Caravan of Infinity)
- Çile I (1962) (Anguish I)
- Şiirlerim (My poems) (1969)
- Esselâm (1973) (Welcome)
- Çile II (1974) (Anguish II)
- Bu Yağmur (This Rain)
- Canım İstanbul (My Dear Istanbul)

=== Novels ===
- Aynadaki Yalan (1980) (The Lie in the Mirror)
- Kafa Kağıdı (1984-Published as a series in Milliyet newspaper)

=== Stories ===
- Birkaç Hikâye Birkaç Tahlil (1932) (Some Stories and Some Analyses)
- Ruh Burkuntularından Hikayeler (1964) (Stories From Soul Shatters)
- Hikâyelerim (1970) (My Stories)

=== Memoirs ===
- Cinnet Mustatili (1955) (Rectangle of the Possessed)
- Ideolocya Örgüsü (1968) (The Weave of Ideology)
- Hac (1973) (Hajj)
- O ve Ben (1974) (He and I)
- Bâbıâli (1975) (The Sublime Porte)

=== Plays ===
- Bir Adam Yaratmak (To Create A Man)
- Tohum (Seed)
- Reis Bey (Mr. Judge)
- Para (Money)
- Sabır Taşı (Stone of Patience)
- Ahşap Konak (Wooden Mansion)
- Kanlı Sarık (Bloody Turban)
- Püf Noktası (The Thin Line)
- İbrahim Ethem
- Yunus Emre
- Abdülhamin Han (Abdulhamid Khan)
- Mukaddes Emanet (The Holy Escrow)
- Siyah Pelerinli Adam (The Man With Black Cloak)
- Parmaksız Salih (Fingerless Salih)

== See also ==
- List of contemporary Turkish poets
