= Suna Selen =

Turkish actress (born 1939)

- Born: 1 July 1939 (age 86); Istanbul, Turkey
- Occupation: Actress
- Years active: 1960–present
- Spouse(s): Cem Kabaağaç; Münir Özkul; Güner Sümer
- Children: 3

Suna Selen (born 1 July 1939) is a Turkish actress of theatre, film and television. She has appeared in numerous plays at the Istanbul State Theatre.

== Life ==
Selen was born in 1939 in Istanbul. Her father was lawyer Hüsamettin Selen, and her mother, Nimet Selen, was a granddaughter of scholar Ahmed Cevdet Pasha and daughter of Fatma Aliye Topuz.

She finished her high school education at the Beşiktaş Atatürk Anadolu Lisesi. During her high school years she also attended the Theatre Department of Beşiktaş Municipal Conservatory. In 1956, she started studying law at the request of her family. At the same time she started to work at the Dormen Theatre. A year later, she left the law school and started her painting education at the Istanbul Academy of Fine Arts. In 1957, she married the painter Cem Kabaağaç and together they had a son. After her marriage, she left the Academy and pitched out her role at the Dormen Theatre. She began her professional career in the theatre season of 1959–60 with Alexandro Casona's Woman Coming at Dawn. During the same season she soon became famous as Nicole Cerusier in Alber Husson's comedy The Pavements in the Sky.

In addition to theatre plays, she also starred in a number of motion pictures and series. For her role as the Witch in Pamuk Prenses ve 7 Cüceler she won the Best Supporting Actress award at the 1971 International Antalya Film Festival. She was the recipient of the Best Supporting Actress award at the Ankara International Film Festival for her role as Füruzan in Cazibe Hanımın Gündüz Düşleri. For her role as Elmas in Gönderilmemiş Mektuplar, Selen won the Best Actress award at the International Istanbul Film Festival.

Selen's second marriage was to Münir Özkul, from which she has a daughter, named Güner Özkul. In 1974, she divorced Münir Özkul and married play writer Güner Sümer. She later gave birth to her third child and second son Sinan Sümer.

In 2016, "because of the dignity she gained in acting profession during her long life as an artist", she became the first recipient of the Lifetime Nadide Küntay Award at the İsmet Küntay Theatre Awards ceremony.

== Theater ==
- Kalpak : Vera Kissel – Istanbul State Theater – 2013
- Antigone : Sophocles – Istanbul State Theater – 2011
- King Kong's Daughters : Theresia Walser – Istanbul State Theater – 2010
- Arıza : Emre Koyuncuoğlu – İKSV – 2006
- Yaban : Yakup Kadri Karaosmanoğlu – Istanbul State Theater – 2004
- Kırmızı Yorgunları : Özen Yula – İzmit City Theater – 2003
- Blood Wedding : Federico García Lorca – Istanbul State Theater – 2000
- Gel Evlenelim Yürü Boşanalım Necati Cumalı – Istanbul State Theater – 1999
- Atçalı Kel Memet : Orhan Asena – Istanbul State Theater – 1998
- Tartuffe : Molière – Diyarbakır State Theater – 1997
- Blood Wedding : Federico García Lorca – Diyarbakır State Theater – 1996
- Sevgili Yalan : Jurgen Cross : Diyarbakır State Theater – 1994
- Budala : Fyodor Dostoevsky\Simon Gray – Istanbul State Theater – 1990

== Filmography ==
- Koza – 2021 Librarian
- Gülümse Kaderine – 2022
- Üç Kuruş – 2022
- Mucize 2: Aşk – 2019
- Kızım – 2018
- Our History – 2017
- Hayat Devam Ediyor – 2011
- Devrimden Sonra – 2011
- Karadaglar - 2011
- New York'ta Beş Minare – 2010
- Kayıp Prenses – 2008
- Beyaz Melek – 2007
- Zincirbozan – 2007
- Tutkunum Sana – 2006
- Kızlar Yurdu -2006
- Yeniden Çalıkuşu – 2005
- Nehir – 2005
- Cemalim – 2005
- Sihirli Annem – 2006
- Büyü – 2004
- Yadigar – 2004
- Kısmet – 2004
- Beş Kollu Avize – 2004
- Yağmur Zamanı – 2004
- Bulutları Beklerken – 2003
- Hızma – 2002
- Gönderilmemiş Mektuplar – 2002
- Benimle Evlenir misin – 2001
- Fidan Hanım'a Ne Oldu – 2001
- Samyeli – 2000
- Halk Çocuğu – 2000
- Zümrüt / Gözlerim Aklına Gelirse – 2000
- Doğum Yeri Absürdistan – 1999
- Mektup – 1997
- Babaanne – 1997
- Sırtımdan Vuruldum – 1997
- Devridaim – 1997
- Şahmaran – 1993
- Yaz Yağmuru – 1993
- Yaz Evi – 1993
- Piano Piano Bacaksız – 1992
- Sarı Tebessüm – 1992
- Cazibe Hanımın Gündüz Düşleri – 1992
- Kurt Kanunu – 1991
- Ölür Ayak – 1991
- Issızlığın Ortası – 1991
- Lüküs Hayat – 1989
- 077 Hızır – Acil Servis – 1988
- Bir Tren Yolculuğu – 1988
- Keşanlı Ali Destanı – 1988 Şerif Abla
- Su da Yanar – 1987
- Unutamadığım – 1987
- Ateşten Günler – 1987
- Oteldeki Cinayet – 1986
- Çalıkuşu – 1986
- Bugünün Saraylısı – 1985
- Fırtına Gönüller – 1984
- Çocuklar Çiçektir – 1983
- Can Kurban – 1983
- Gecelerin Kadını – 1983
- İffet – 1982
- Faize Hücum – 1982
- At – 1981
- Aşka Dönüş – 1981
- Kürtaj – 1981
- Kan Bağı – 1981
- Hınç – 1976
- Sahte Kabadayı – 1976
- Oy Emine – 1975
- Esir Hayat – 1974
- Yüreğimde Yare Var – 1974
- İstek – 1974
- Dertli – 1973
- Evlat Acısı – 1973
- Kaderim – 1973
- Hudutların Kartalı – 1973
- Bir Pınar ki – 1972
- Paprika Gaddarın Aşkı – 1972
- Ölüm Korkusu – 1972
- Yetimler Ahı – 1972
- Para – 1972
- İki Ruhlu Kadın – 1971
- Binbir Gece Masalları – 1971
- Sinderella Kül Kedisi – 1971
- Yedi Kocalı Hürmüz – 1971
- Kerem İle Aslı – 1971
- Fatoş Sokakların Meleği – 1971
- Ayşecik Ve Sihirli Cüceler Rüyalar Ülkesinde – 1971
- Bir Genç Kızın Romanı – 1971
- Senede Bir Gün – 1971
- Pamuk Prenses Ve 7 Cüceler – 1970
- Küçük Hanımın Şoförü – 1970
- Sürtüğün Kızı – 1967
- Silahları Ellerinde Öldüler – 1967
- Suçlu Çocuklar – 1965
- Kezban – 1963
- Üç Çapkın Gelin – 1963
- Sevimli Haydut – 1961
- Kalp Yarası – 1961
- Dikenli Gül – 1961
- Kolsuz Bebek (Üç Öykülü Film) – 1961
- Mahalle Arkadaşları – 1961
- Izdırap Çocuğu – 1960
- Gecelerin Ötesi – 1960
