= İzzet Ulvi Aykurt =

Turkish politician

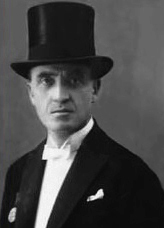

Member of the Grand National Assembly

Personal details
- Born: 1880 Eskişehir, Ottoman Empire
- Died: 8 November 1957 (aged 76–77)

İzzet Ulvi Aykurt (1880, in Eskişehir – 8 November 1957) was a Turkish nationalist writer, politician, and a prominent member of the CHP during the one-party period.

== Biography ==
İzzet Ulvi was born in Eskişehir in 1880. In 1902, he was sentenced to three years in prison and three years in exile for participating in the liberty movements. İzzet Ulvi, who was released in the 1908 revolution, started to publish articles and poems in various newspapers and magazines and his reputation in this field has become widespread. In the meantime, he actively participated in the reform movement of the Turkish language, which was initiated by Mustafa Kemal Atatürk.

İzzet Ulvi Bey, in the days of Turkish National Movement, especially in the Afyonkarahisar front, got provided great benefits from the locals. Organized in Afyonkarahisar, he took part in the resistance movement, it attracted the attention of Mustafa Kemal and his colleagues. When the Turkish Republic was proclaimed, he became a member of the Turkish parliament. He died in 1957.
