= Kemalist Turkey =

Kemalist Turkey may refer to:

- Government of the Grand National Assembly, the government in Ankara during the Turkish War of Independence
- One-party period of the Republic of Turkey, the period when Turkey was governed by a one-party regime from 1923 to 1945

== See also ==
- Turkish National Movement
- Kemalism
