= Zafer (newspaper) =

Turkish newspaper (1949–1960)

- Cover of Zafer dated 8 August 1952
- Type: Daily newspaper
- Founder: Mümtaz Faik Fenik
- Publisher: Güneş Press
- Founded: 30 April 1949
- Ceased publication: 26 May 1960
- Language: Turkish
- Headquarters: Ankara
- Country: Turkey

Zafer (Turkish: Victory) was a daily newspaper which was published in Ankara, Turkey, between 1949 and 1960. It was one of the leading newspapers in Turkey during the 1950s. It is known for its close affiliation with the Democrat Party (DP) which was the ruling party in the period between 1950 and 1960. The paper was closed by the Turkish authorities immediately after the military coup on 27 May 1960 which ended the rule of the DP.

== History and profile ==
Zafer was first published on 30 April 1949. It came out daily and was headquartered in Ankara. Its founder was Mümtaz Faik Fenik who was a journalist and a deputy of Ankara for the DP. He also headed the DP's campaign in the 1946 election. The publishing company was the Güneş Press owned by Fenik. Later the paper was managed by other DP members, including Zeki Rıza Sporel, Zühtü Hilmi Velibeşe and Kâmil Gündeş. Editors-in-chief of Zafer included Şemsi Cemil Altay, Fatin Fuad, Sacid Ögel, Cenap Yakar, Turhan Dilligil and Atilla Onuk. Its major contributors were Adviye Fenik, Ali Fuat Başgil, Ahmet Muhip Dıranas, Bahadır Ülger, Burhan Apaydın, Burhan Belge, Fazıl Ahmet Aykaç, Hikmet Yazıcıoğlu, Orhan Seyfi Orhon, Rıfkı Salim Burçak, Sefaettin Karanakçı and Perihan Parla.

As a result of its closeness to the ruling party Zafer was named as the "partisan publication" by the opposition figures. The paper was given the highest number of official advertisements in the period between 1951 and 1958.

Zafer was one of the Turkish newspapers which supported the resistance of Hungarian people against the Soviet Union in 1956. The others were Milliyet and Hürriyet.

The last issue of Zafer numbered 3832 appeared on 26 May 1960, a day before the military coup.
