= Socialism in Turkey =

Socialist movement in Turkey

Socialism in Turkey originated with the formation of the Communist Party of Turkey (TKP) by Mustafa Subhi in 1920. Since then, several political parties have attempted to carry out a communist revolution. Marxism–Leninism, Maoism, and democratic confederalism have been the most prominent socialist ideologies. The socialist movement has been closely linked to support for Kurdish rights, Alevi rights, LGBTQ rights, and other social causes.

== Mustafa Subhi and the TKP ==
The first TKP congress was held in Baku in September 1920, when Mustafa Subhi was elected chairman. The TKP was composed of communists seeking victory against the Western powers occupying Anatolia and aiming to establish a communist state. Many of its early members, including Subhi, had been active alongside the Bolsheviks. Subhi and 14 other communists later traveled to Anatolia, after which the party's activities became more prominent.

Although Mustafa Kemal Atatürk and the Ankara Government opposed communism, they maintained close relations with the Soviet Union, which provided aid during the Turkish War of Independence. Atatürk founded a separate socialist party, the Turkish Communist Party (TKF), to curb the influence of the TKP. The TKF applied to join the Comintern, an organization advocating for international communism, but was rejected due to pressure from the TKP, which was already a member. The TKF was dissolved in 1921 after the uprising of Ethem the Circassian. On their return journey to Azerbaijan, Subhi and his 14 companions were murdered by the ship's crew.

== Atatürk's presidency (1923–1938) ==
During Atatürk's presidency, the Republican People's Party (CHP) government suppressed socialism by arresting socialists and banning the TKP. In 1925, the Maintenance of Order Law was passed, giving the government emergency powers, including closing political parties. The TKP was banned, although it continued to operate secretly. In 1926, the party became more critical of the CHP and Atatürk's rule.

The party had internal discussions about its position on Kemalism. They largely acted in accordance with the Comintern's preferences, although some party members disagreed. In 1927, Vedat Nedim Tör, the general secretary of TKP at the time, left the party and handed party files to the police, leading to mass arrests of TKP members.

Socialist magazines such as "Aydınlık" and "Orak-Çekiç" were banned. Similarly, Marxist writers and poets such as Nazım Hikmet Ran and Sabahattin Ali have been imprisoned.

== '68 Generation ==
Socialism in Turkey rose in popularity after the 1960 Turkish coup d'état, which increased political and workers' freedoms. In 1961, the Workers' Party of Turkey was founded.

Rightist-leftist conflicts were a major feature of the 1970s in Turkey. These conflicts were fought between ultranationalists and Marxists. Communist armed groups played a significant role in these conflicts as they fought for a Marxist–Leninist revolution. In 1970, THKP-C was formed by Mahir Çayan. Their first action was the kidnapping of Ephraim Elrom, an Israeli consul, whom they killed in May 1971. Çayan was arrested four days later. THKP-C and THKO (another Marxist party formed in the late 1960s) sent their militants to the PFLP in Palestine for guerrilla training. THKO's first action was robbing a bank in Ankara. Several months later, they kidnapped four US military personnel and set a ransom of 40,000 dollars. They released the soldiers after failing to obtain the ransom.

After the 1971 Turkish military memorandum, the army took a more aggressive stance against leftist parties. Deniz Gezmiş, Hüseyin İnan, and Yusuf Aslan (leaders and founders of THKO) were arrested days after the memorandum and sentenced to death. Mahir Çayan, who had escaped from prison, formed an alliance with THKO.

In April 1972, the Communist Party of Turkey/Marxist–Leninist (TKP/ML) broke away from the Revolutionary Workers' and Peasants' Party of Turkey (TİİKP), with İbrahim Kaypakkaya as its first chairman. Unlike many socialists of the time, Kaypakkaya was a Maoist and anti-Kemalist. He believed the USSR was not Marxist and had returned to a bourgeoisie state. He founded his party on these ideas. In January 1973, Kaypakkaya was shot in the neck during a conflict with the Turkish gendarmerie. Ali Haydar Yıldız, one of TKP/ML's commanders, died in the conflict alongside other militants. Kaypakkaya survived and escaped. After days of traveling in the mountains, he reached a village where he was reported to the gendarmerie by a teacher named Cafer Atan. Kaypakkaya was arrested and sent to Diyarbakır Prison. He was tortured and interrogated for weeks before dying in May 1973. TKP/ML continued operating under Süleyman Cihan.

Several other socialist parties and organizations were formed later, such as MLSPB and the Progressive Youth Organization. TİİKP dissolved in 1977. During this decade, socialists highlighted the oppression of Kurds and Alevis. Minority rights remain a primary leftist concern. An example is Kaypakkaya, who supported Lenin's idea of "The Right of Nations to Self-Determination" and believed in its implementation for Kurds.

=== Bloody May Day (1977) ===
During the 1 May celebrations in Taksim Square in Istanbul, a group of unidentified individuals fired into the crowd from the square and a neighboring hotel. Thirty-four people were killed and 136 were injured.

== PKK, 1980 coup and democratic confederalism ==
On 12 September 1980, a military coup was carried out by the Turkish Army, led by Kenan Evren. Economic problems, rightist-leftist conflicts, and the growing prominence of Kurdish nationalism were cited as reasons for the coup. After the coup, 650,000 people were arrested. Fifty people were sentenced to be executed, many for political reasons. A notable example is Erdal Eren, a socialist who was charged with murder and executed at the age of 17. It has been claimed that some Kurdish socialists were tortured in prisons.

Abdullah Öcalan embraced Marxism–Leninism in the early 1970s. In 1974, he formed ADYÖD, a student organization for Marxists. He was arrested one year later for producing "communist propaganda". In 1978, he founded the Kurdistan Workers' Party (PKK).

After the 1980 coup, more PKK members were arrested, including Kemal Pir, one of the PKK's founding members, and Mazlum Doğan, who was the general editor of Serxwebûn. Both were sent to Diyarbakır Prison, where they died as a result of torture. In 1984, the PKK declared a "Kurdish insurgency". This marked the beginning of the years-long PKK insurgency.

During and after the 1990s, the PKK abandoned the goal of a Kurdish nation-state, and instead began to advocate for an autonomous region within Turkey. The PKK also abandoned Marxism–Leninism in favor of Abdullah Öcalan's new ideology, "democratic confederalism". Drawing heavily on communalism, Öcalan presented this ideology as a way for Kurds and Turks to live together. In 1999, he was arrested in Nairobi and brought to Turkey. He was initially sentenced to death, which was later commuted to life imprisonment. Kurdistan Communities Union (KCK) was founded in 2005 as a political organization that embraced democratic confederalism. It became active in the Syrian Civil War.

== Current years ==
Despite having fewer followers, socialist parties still exist, and most of them are legal and participate in elections. The Communist Party of Turkey (TKP), which is not the same as the TKP of the 1920s, won the local elections in Tunceli in 2019. The Workers' Party of Turkey (TİP), which is not the same as the TİP of the 1960s, has three seats in parliament. TİP also supports the LGBTQ movement.
