= Beşiktaş Atatürk Anatolian High School =

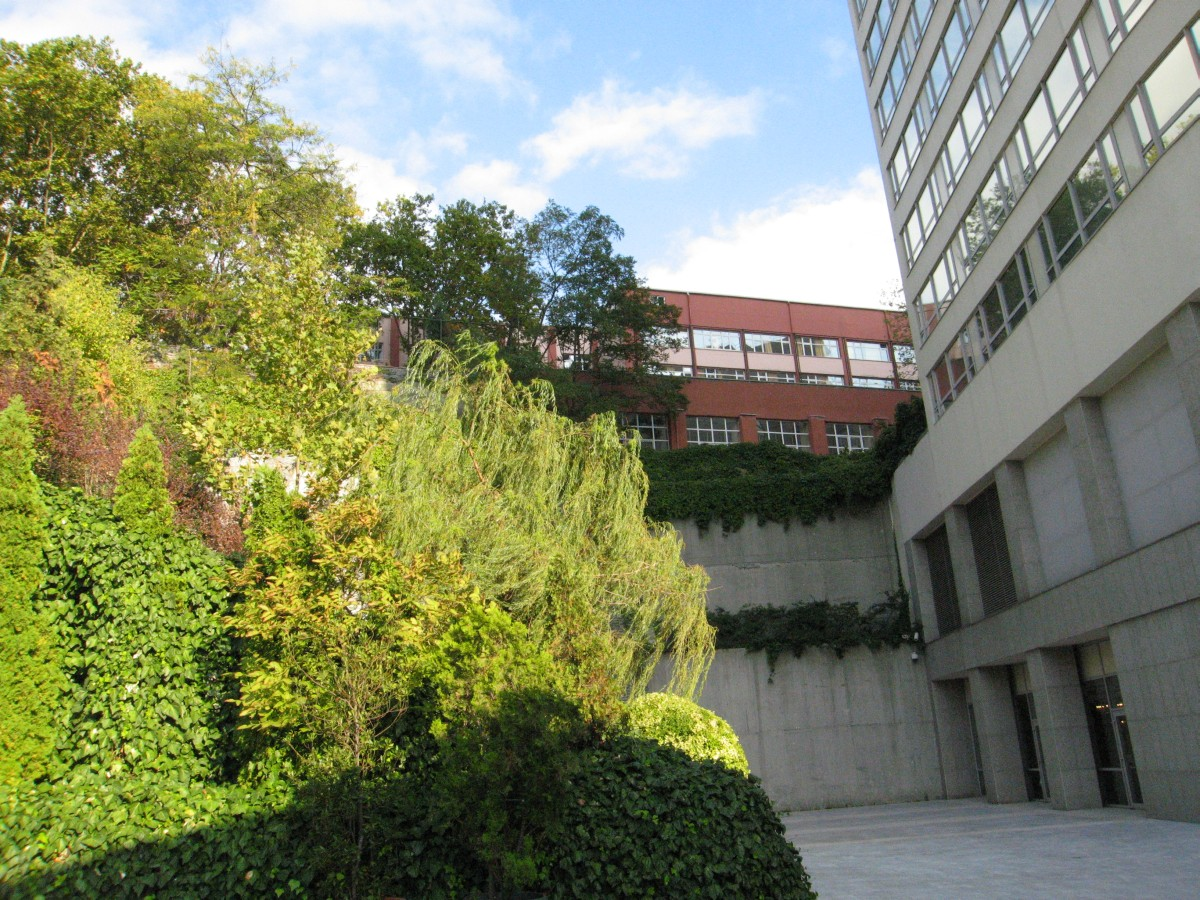

Location
- Cihannüma Mah. Serencebey Yokuşu, No: 69 Yıldız Beşiktaş, Istanbul
- 41.0476°N 29.0104°E

Information
- Type: Anatolian High School
- Established: 1936
- Principal: Hasan Varıcı
- Enrollment: 1500 (2007)
- Campus: Serencebey
- Colors: Beige, White
- Nickname: BAAL

Beşiktaş Atatürk Anatolian High School (Turkish: Beşiktaş Atatürk Anadolu Lisesi or briefly "BAAL") is an Anatolian High School located on the European side of Istanbul and one of the most prominent high schools founded by the first prime minister, İsmet İnönü, in Turkey . The primary languages of instruction are Turkish and English. The secondary foreign languages are German and French.

== History ==
The school was first established under the name "İnönü Ortaokulu" ("İnönü Secondary School") in Beyoğlu, Istanbul in 1936. Two years later, it was turned into a high school and renamed "İnönü Lisesi" ("İnönü High School"). Later in 1945, the school underwent another transformation and took the name "Beyoğlu Kız Lisesi" ("Beyoğlu Girls' High School"), accepting only the female students. In the years 1953 and 1954 the school was renamed twice and continued to give education under the name "İstanbul Atatürk Kız Lisesi" ("Istanbul Atatürk Girls' High School") until 1985. As of 1975, the school gradually transitioned to coeducation. In 1984–85 academic year the school went through a major transformation and received the title "Anatolian High School". From 1985 up to 2005, the school offered a seven-year education including preparatory class.

== Notable alumni ==
- Aylin Aslım
- Gülten Akın
- Halit Ergenç
- Hülya Koçyiğit
- Ece Erken
- Lale Oraloğlu
- Levent Kazak
- Masis Aram Gözbek
- Nazlı Deniz Kuruoğlu
- Özkan Manav
- Sibel Tüzün
- Suna Selen

== See also ==
- List of schools in Istanbul
