= Ahmet Muhip Dıranas =

Turkish poet

- Ahmet Muhip Dıranas
- Born: 1909; Sinop, Ottoman Empire
- Died: 27 June 1980 (aged 70–71); Ankara, Turkey
- Occupations: Playwright, poet, author

Ahmet Muhip Dıranas (1909 – 27 June 1980) was a leading Turkish poet and writer.

== Biography ==
He was born in Sinop, Ottoman Empire in 1909. Having completed his primary education in Sinop, he moved to Ankara and graduated from Ankara High School. He then went to Istanbul for a university degree and studied philosophy at Istanbul University. He returned to Ankara in 1938, and worked as a director in the CHP headquarters. Having completed his military service, he continued his career as a publication director in the Society for the Protection of Children (Turkish: Çocuk Esirgeme Kurumu) in Ankara.

In the 1950s he was a regular contributor of the Democrat Party newspaper Zafer.

== Bibliography ==
Poetry

- "Şiirler" (1974)
- "Kırık Saz" (1975)

Plays

- "Gölgeler" (1947)
- "O Böyle İstemezdi" (1948)

Translated plays

- "Aptal" (1940 - translated from Dostoevski's Idiot)

Research

- "Fransa'da Müstakil Resim" (1937 - with Cahit Sıtkı Tarancı)

== See also ==
- List of contemporary Turkish poets
