= 1930 Turkish local elections =

- September / October 1930

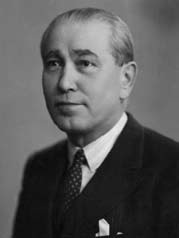
Party	CHP	Liberal Republican Party
Municipalities won	478	24
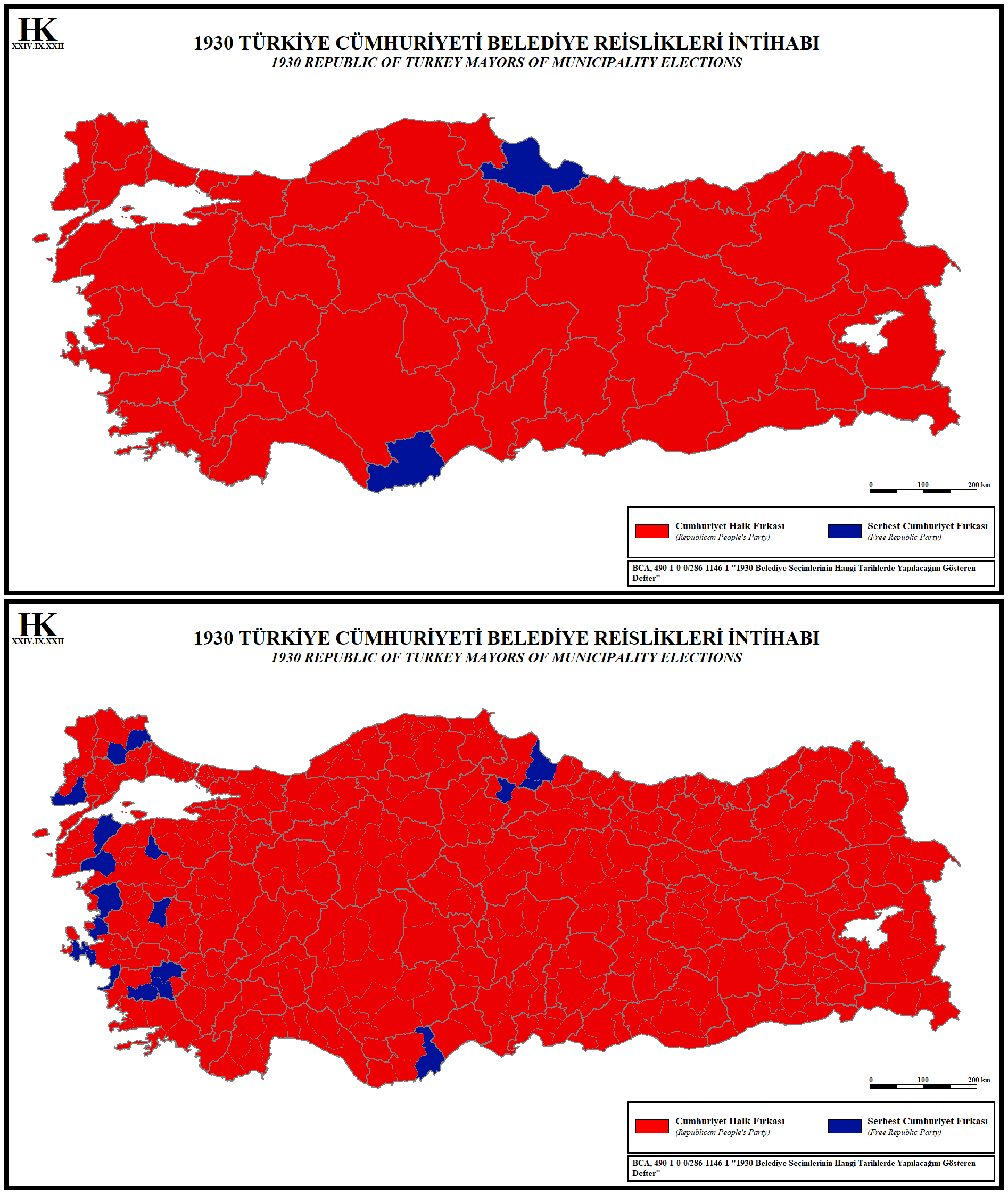

The 1930 Turkish local elections represent the inaugural multi-party electoral exercise in the history of the Republic of Turkey, conducted throughout September and October. Following the enactment of the Municipalities Law on April 4, 1930, the elections were contested by the Republican People's Party (CHF) and the newly established Liberal Republican Party (SCF). In these elections, mayors were elected via a two-stage process from among and by the members of the municipal councils.

A significant characteristic of these elections was the granting of suffrage and eligibility for office to women for the first time. Indeed, the law mandated that all citizens regardless of gender who had reached the age of 18 possessed the right to vote, while those aged 25 and above were eligible for election.

Despite having been founded only one month prior to the election, the SCF established its organization rapidly across numerous provinces; however, due to pressures exerted by state officials and CHF functionaries, it secured victory in only 24 of the 502 electoral districts. According to one source, Mustafa Kemal expressed considerable indignation regarding the SCF's victory in certain municipalities.

Following these elections, which indicated that a segment of the populace was dissatisfied with CHF policies, the pressure from the CHF upon the SCF intensified. Consequently, after receiving significant public support during the tumultuous Izmir rally, the SCF was dissolved by its founder, Fethi Bey, shortly after completing its third month of existence.

== Pre-election period ==
In Turkey, a single-party government was grappling with the political, social, and economic exigencies precipitated by the 1929 Great Depression, as well as the preceding World War I and the Turkish War of Independence. Furthermore, a substantial portion of the national budget was being allocated to railway investments, and the government, facing difficulties in financing these projects, resorted to the imposition of new taxes. Conversely, there were no alternative political parties to articulate the demands and grievances of the public or to provide legal and political opposition to the government's economic policies.

Mustafa Kemal, emphasizing the importance of pacifying the dissatisfied segments of society, believed that the solution to Turkey's systemic problems lay in the establishment of a controlled opposition party. Fethi Bey founded the SCF on August 12, 1930, following assurances from Mustafa Kemal that he would be supported under all circumstances. With the foundation of the SCF, those discontented with the single-party regime flocked to the new party.

Facing a constrained timeline for both organizational structuring and electoral preparation, the SCF rapidly initiated its nationwide deployment. Fethi Bey announced that he would not establish organizations in several provinces in Eastern and Southeastern Anatolia to ensure that the state’s security policies—necessitated by the Sheikh Said rebellion and the Ararat rebellion—would not be compromised.

== Election results ==
According to official statements regarding the election results, the SCF emerged victorious in 24 out of 502 electoral districts. The locations won by the SCF are recorded as 2 provinces (Samsun and Silifke), 16 districts, and 6 sub-districts: Bozdoğan, Nazilli, and Çine districts of Aydın, along with the sub-districts of Yenipazar, Atça, and Karapınar; the Keşan district of Edirne; the Central district of Silifke; the Bergama, Kuşadası, Menemen, Seferihisar, and Urla districts of İzmir, along with the sub-districts of Buca, Kınık, and Armutlu; the Gördes district of Manisa; the Central and Ladik districts of Samsun; the Merzifon district of Amasya; the Edremit and Susurluk districts of Balıkesir; and the Lüleburgaz and Vize districts of Kırklareli.

In Istanbul, the CHF received a total of 35,942 votes, while the SCF received 12,868. The Vakit newspaper reported these figures as 35,934 for the CHF and 12,813 for the SCF. According to the same newspaper, the number of non-voting electors in Istanbul reached 250,746. In other cities:

- In Ayvalık, CHF received 1,143 and SCF received 1,044 votes;
- In İzmir, CHF received 14,624 and SCF received 9,600;
- In Bergama, CHF received 250 and SCF received 1,371;
- In Merzifon, CHF received 496 and SCF received 557;
- In Samsun, CHF received 416 and SCF received 3,312;
- In Lüleburgaz, CHF received 1,320 and SCF received 1,989.

== Post-election period ==
The interest shown in a party with a brief lifespan of only three months clearly demonstrated the existence of a segment of the population dissatisfied with CHF policies. Immediately following the election, letters of grievance were received from various provinces, alleging that governors, district governors, and all state officials had adopted a stance in favor of the CHF, violating the principle of neutrality, and that the public had been coerced into voting for the CHF through pressure and violence. President Mustafa Kemal Atatürk expressed his reaction to these events to İsmet İnönü with the following words:

It is well. Be pleased. We have understood the situation. We see that you have not been able to satisfy the people.

SCF executives asserted that these election results did not reflect reality. In their view, the SCF had won the election, but the results were obtained through coercion and corruption. Fethi Bey submitted a motion during the session of the TBMM on November 6, 1930, regarding the alleged irregularities. Subsequently, taking the floor during the session on November 15, he enumerated the allegations of corruption and intimidation.

After Fethi Bey, CHF deputies criticized him and SCF policies, alleging that it was actually the SCF that had engaged in electoral fraud; consequently, relations between the two parties became severely strained. Following the vote in the TBMM, the motion was rejected by 221 votes to 10. In light of these developments, Fethi Bey submitted his petition for the dissolution of the SCF to the Ministry of Interior on November 17, 1930. Sometime after the closure of the SCF, the Council of State annulled the municipal elections in the locations won by the SCF and appointed CHF mayors and council members to these positions.
