= Vedat Nedim Tör =

Ahmet Vedat Nedim Tör was a Turkish Marxist and Kemalist who wrote for Aydınlık, Kadro, Cumhuriyet and Vatan.

== Aydınlık and Kadro ==
While studying in Germany, he became acquainted with the Spartacus Movement and became a Marxist. In the early 1920’s, Nedim contributed to Aydınlık, the journal of the Marxist Turkish Workers and Peasants Socialist Party. He also wrote for Resimli Ay, a journal edited by Liberal intellectual Zekeriya Sertel. Under influence from Nedim and Şevket Süreyya Aydemir, the new Turkish Communist Party became one of the most independent, nationalist and critical of the Comintern. In 1932, Nedim and Süreyya co-founded Marxist-Kemalist journal Kadro together with Yakup Kadri Karaosmanoğlu, Burhan Asaf Belge, İsmail Hüsrev Tökin and Mehmet Şevki Yazman. Nedim became editor. At Kadro, Nedim wrote in advocacy of a more autarkic Turkish economy, arguing countries would remain except if they reached economic independence. Kadro’s ideas from this time helped the development of anti-imperialism and thirdworldism in Kemalist Turkey.

== Later life ==
In 1934, Kadro was closed by the government. After Kadro folded, Nedim worked in government for 4 years. For 3 years, he was a manager in the General Directorate of Press. He spent another in the Directorate of Tourism. After than, he spent five years working as director at Ankara Radio, then worked at the Ankara Electric Company. In this period, he also wrote for Cumhuriyet and Vatan.
