= Ece Erken =

Turkish TV-hostess and actress

- Born: May 11, 1978 (age 48); Çorlu, Turkey
- Occupations: TV presenter, actress
- Years active: 1990–present
- Spouses: Tuncer Öztarhan (m. 2007; div. 2009) Serkan Uçar (m. 2014; div. 2015) Şafak Mahmutyazıcıoğlu (m. 2021; died 2022)
- Children: 1

Ece Erken (born May 11, 1978) is a Turkish TV-hostess and actress. She is best known for hit youth series "Lise Defteri".

== Biography ==
Ece Erken was born in the city of Samsun, Turkey in 1978. She did her education in Beşiktaş Atatürk Anadolu Lisesi in Istanbul. So far Erken has worked at BRT, Radyo Vizyon, Radyo Genç, Kral TV, Metropol FM, Alem FM, Show Radyo, Radyo Viva, Star TV, Fox TV, Kanal 6, Number 1 TV, Kanal 1 and TRT 1. She got married for the first time in 2007, but divorced in 2009. She has a son from her second marriage named Eymen, born on 15 April 2015.

== Filmography ==
TV series
Year	Title	Role	Notes
1999	Nilgün	Nilgün	Leading role
2002	Aşk ve Gurur	Ahu	Leading role
2003	Lise Defteri	Nil	Leading role
Programs
2008	Mavi Şeker	Presenter	Channel: ATV
2009	En Beyaz Geceler	Presenter	Channel: ATV
2010	Aç Aç Kazan	Presenter	Channel: Fox
2011	Hayata Gülerken	Presenter	Channel: KanalTürk
2014	Tatlım Benim	Presenter	Channel: Beyaz TV
2017	İyi Fikir	Presenter	Channel: TRT 1
2018	Söylemezsem Olmaz	Presenter	Channel: Beyaz TV
