= Serdengeçti =

Conservative magazine in Turkey (1947–1962)

- Editor: Osman Yüksel
- Categories: Political magazine
- Frequency: Monthly
- Founder: Osman Yüksel
- Founded: 1942
- First issue: 20 April 1947
- Final issue: 1962
- Country: Turkey
- Based in: Ankara
- Language: Turkish

Serdengeçti was a conservative magazine which existed between 1947 and 1962 in Ankara, Turkey. The magazine managed to publish only thirty-three issues due to its frequent bans. It is known to be one of the early publications supporting political Islam in Turkey. Its founder and editor was Osman Yüksel who used the title of the magazine as his surname.

== History and profile ==
Serdengeçti was first published on 20 April 1947. It was started, edited and published by Osman Yüksel. The magazine came out monthly and was headquartered in Ankara. Its subtitle was The magazine of those who run to God, nation and homeland. It was described on the cover page as the magazine which worships the truth and supports the people.

Serdengeçti featured critical articles on nationalism and religious affairs and did not publish any advertisement. Osman Yüksel's slogan, "Tanri Dağı Kadar Türk, Hira Dağı Kadar Müslümanız (Turkish: We are as Turkish as Mount Tengri and as Muslim as Mount Hira), was first published in the magazine and has been used by the nationalist parties in Turkey. It frequently attacked the Republican People's Party and the Kemalist establishment. Although most of the articles were written by Osman Yüksel, leading conservatives such as Nurettin Topçu, Ali Fuat Başgil, Necip Fazıl Kısakürek, Peyami Safa and Eşref Edip also contributed to the magazine. It covered translations of the work by Victor Hugo and Arthur Schopenhauer.

Serdengeçti folded in 1962 after publishing only thirty-three issues.
