= Liberal Republican Party (Turkey) =

Political party in Turkey (1930)

Liberal Republican Party Serbest Cumhuriyet Fırkası
- President and founder: Fethi Okyar
- General Secretary: Nuri Conker
- Founded: August 12, 1930; 95 years ago
- Dissolved: November 17, 1930; 95 years ago
- Split from: Republican People's Party
- Headquarters: Ankara, Turkey
- Newspaper: Serbes Cumhuriyet
- Ideology: Economic liberalism Liberal democracy Liberal Kemalism
- Political position: Centre-right
- Colours: Blue

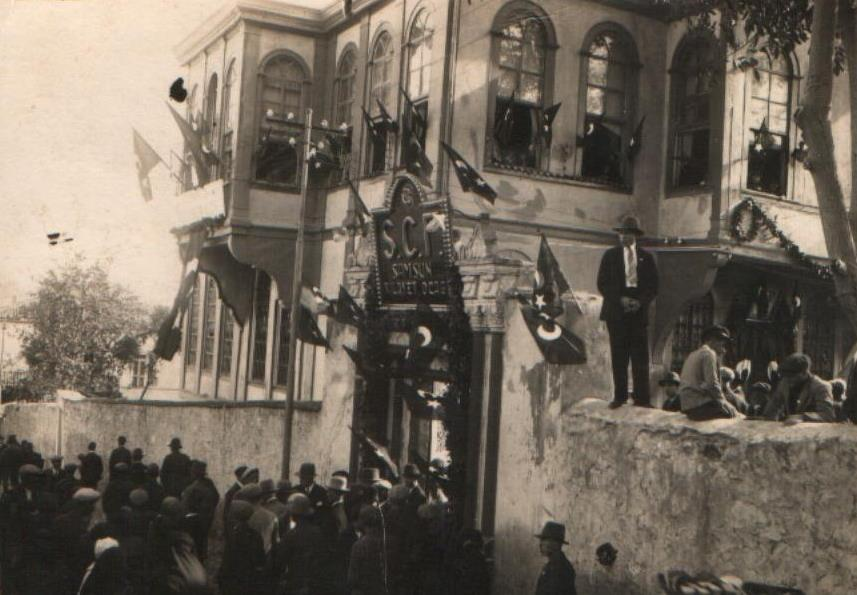
Party office in Samsun

The Liberal Republican Party (sometimes referred to as the Free Republican Party; in Turkish: Serbest Cumhuriyet Fırkası, acronymized as SCF [seːdʒeːfeˑ]) was a political party founded by Ali Fethi Okyar upon President Kemal Atatürk's request in the early years of the Turkish Republic.

In the context of the One-party period, Mustafa Kemal requested that Okyar create a new movement as an opposition party to confront the ruling Republican People's Party with the aim of establishing the tradition of multi-party democracy in Turkey. After the short-lived experiment with the Progressive Republican Party during the period 1924–1925, it represented the second attempt to create a pluralist system in the country.

Although the party advocated liberal views, both economically and politically, in its program, it was quickly embraced by many opponents of Atatürk's reforms, particularly regarding secularism. Thus, after its participation in the 1930 local elections in which it won 31 of 502 municipalities, it was personally dissolved in November 1930 by Okyar, who was an ardent supporter of the reforms.

The closure of the Liberal Republican Party left Turkey as a one-party state until the establishment of the National Development Party (Milli Kalkınma Partisi) in 1945 and the Democrat Party in 1946.

== Ideology ==
The main difference between the SCF and the ruling CHF was that the first claimed that he advocated liberal views in its program. The party produced an 11-point manifesto, which echoed that of the TCF of 1924. There were four main points:

1. Private at the expense of state enterprise, with the abolition of monopolies and the lower of taxes.
2. More tolerant attitude toward foreign capital.
3. Closer connection between Turkey and the League of Nations.
4. Freedom of the press and thought.

== History ==
=== Background ===
1930 was a difficult year in Turkey: the aftermath of the Kurdish revolts and the global economic crisis hit Turkish policies very hard. However, the CHF had no real means of managing this discontent because of its authoritarian structure, which left it without the means of communication with the masses. At the same time, in the Assembly there began to be a discussion about the direction to give to the regime, and two factions emerged around the economic issue: whether to implement a more liberal economy or to keep a more statist one.

Therefore, Mustafa Kemal, who was aware of the existence of discontent thanks to many reports and his frequent inspection tours in the country, decided to allow and even encourage the founding of a loyal opposition party. He decided to entrust this task to Fethi Okyar, a former Prime Minister that had recently returned from a tour of duty as ambassador in Paris and he had submitted a very critical report on İsmet İnönü's government's policies. The Turkish President may also have wanted to put pressure on İnönü who, after five years as PM, had gradually built up his own power base and was no longer a "President's puppet". Anyway, in the summer Kemal and Okyar met for a few days to discuss the issue: Okyar asked for guarantees that the government would allow a new party to function and that Atatürk himself would remain impartial, while the Turkish President demanded that the new party remained loyal to the ideals of republicanism and secularism.

Once the negotiations were over, on August 12, 1930, the Liberal Republican Party was founded by Okyar, who took the role of President. Unlike the TCF in 1924, the SCF was born under Atatürk's directives to weak the growing discontent in the country against the government. To prove his good faith, Kemal let some of his companions join the party: Mehmet Nuri Conker, that became Secretary General, Ahmet Ağaoğlu, end even his sister Makbule Atadan (the first woman member of the party).

Despite Atatürk's claim to maintain an impartial attitude toward political affairs, a strict link between the government and the SCF kept existing. This is clearly shown by the fact that Atatürk, İnönü and Okyar met to decide how many MPs it would have. In the end, only 15 representatives joined the Liberal Party, but they were all eminent members of the Kemalist establishment.

Politicians
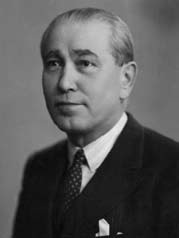
Fethi Okyar

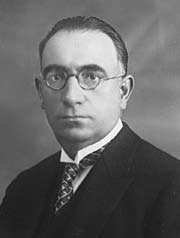
Mehmet Nuri Coker

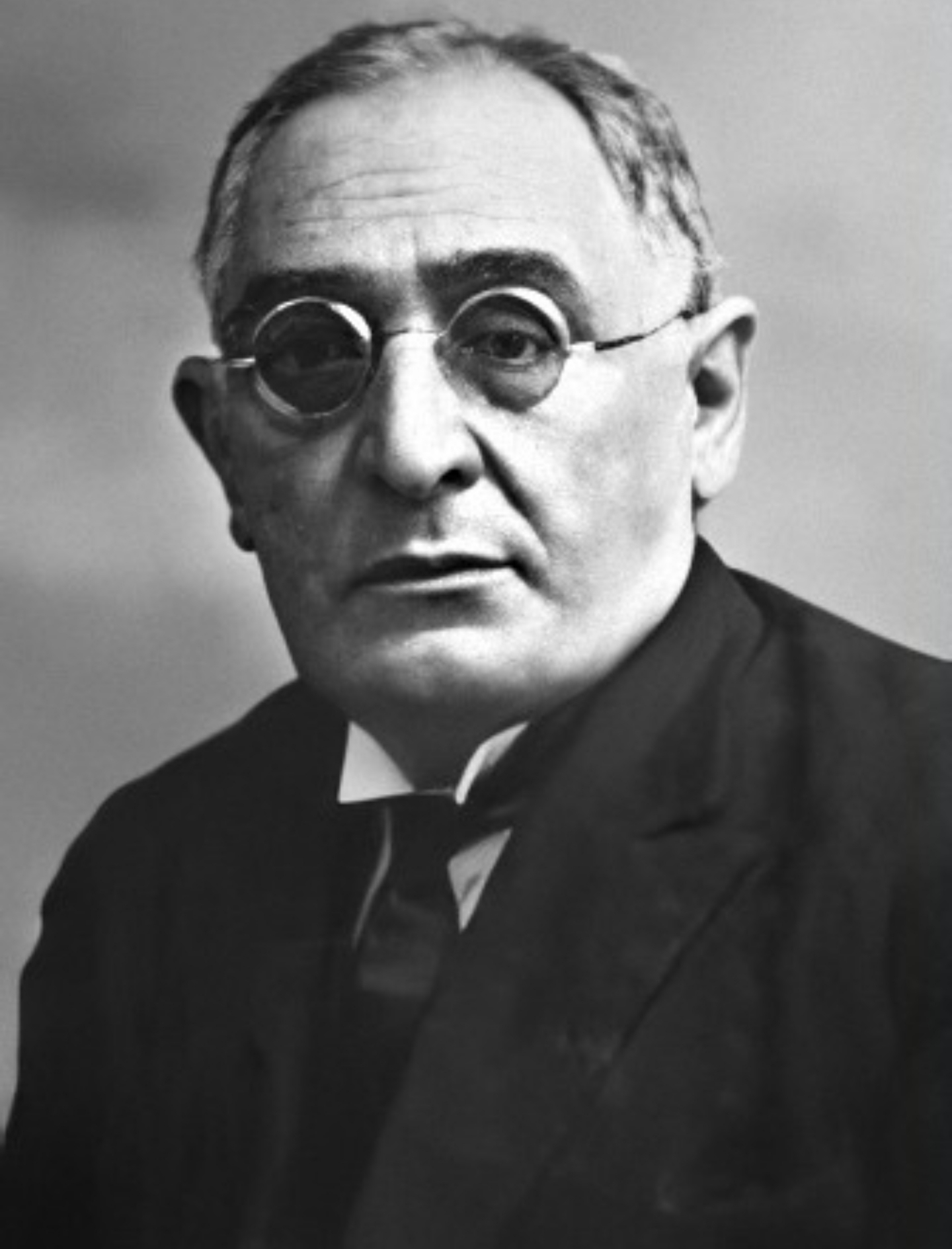
Ahmet Ağaoğlu

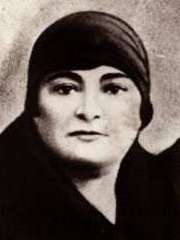
Makbule Atadan

=== A real opposition: first manifestations and local elections ===
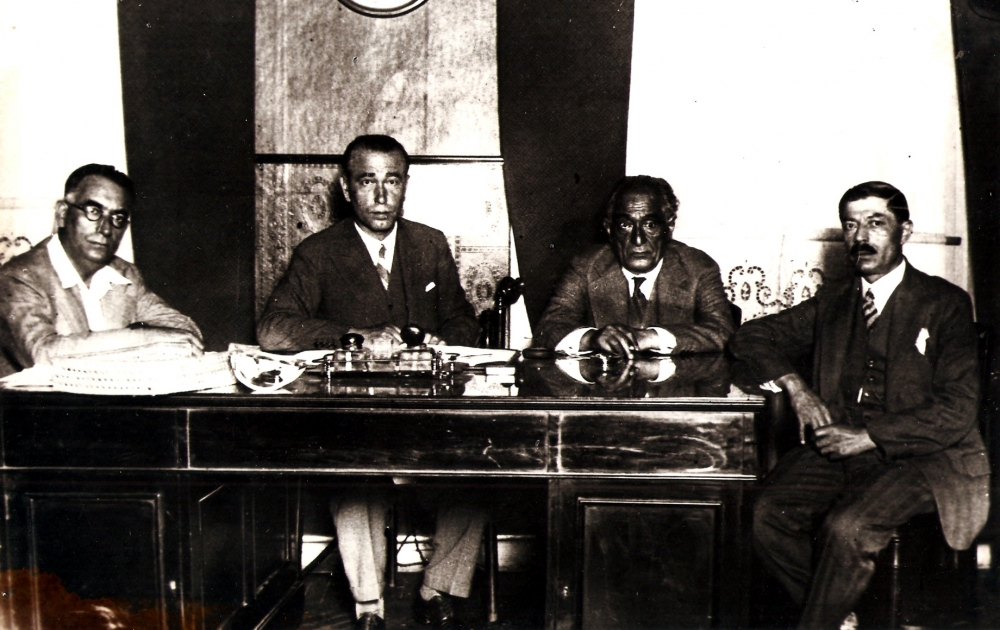
The founders of the Liberal Republican Party of Turkey (from left): Nuri Conker, Ali Fethi Okyar, Ahmet Ağaoğlu and Talat Sönmez.

Despite the presence of many loyal Kemalists within the élite of the new party, and the intention to create an integrated opposition, the SCF was quickly embraced by many groups that felt excluded by the new regime. In fact, it was seen as a means to reverse the reforms of the regime.

There were three main factions that joined the party in opposition to the government: the notables from the countryside, against secularism; the Muslims of Greece that had been subjected to the exchange of population in 1923; many minorities, such as Kurds, Armenians, Greeks, and Jews, against Turkish nationalism. Indeed, since in a one-party regime there were no other alternatives to express discontent towards the government other than an integrated opposition, this party became a tool of resistance to central power.

The party's mobilizing power soon became clear. During his first political speech, held in İzmir on September 4, Okyar met both supporters and adversaries of the government. In particular, these opponents welcomed him with enthusiasm and anti-government demonstrations. Moreover, on September 7, a SCF meeting drew more than 100,000 people around the city, whose population was barely over 150,000. During this event, there were skirmishes with the police, and when the police fired into the crowd a number of people were wounded and a boy killed. The CHF leaders were alarmed and demanded that Mustafa Kemal should state openly that he was and would remain at the head of their party.

One month later, on October 5, local elections took place, and all the people against Kemal's reforms (especially in the Aegean region and Istanbul) voted for the Liberal Party. On this occasion, SCF gained 31 cities out of 502 and captured a number of seats in various municipalities. Where voters didn't have the capacity to resist power pressures, they preferred abstention from vote for CHF. In Istanbul, for instance, the opposition party gained only 12,888 votes, well behind the CHF with 35,942 votes. At the same time, the total number of non-voters reached 250,000. Istanbul was also an example of the support given by minorities to SCF: in this municipality, it fielded five Greeks, two Armenians, and two Jews for forty-two councilman positions.

According to British diplomatic records, the CHF believed that SCF was taking too much consent from the minorities and the reactionaries. There were also some rumours that the Liberal Party was getting the support of Kurds in Constantinople and was courting the ex-Ottoman dynasty. Then, in an assembly debate directly after the elections, Fethi Okyar accused the CHF of large-scale irregularities and electoral fraud. In this context, Atatürk started to worry about the risk of political instability and told Fethi privately that he could no longer remain impartial in this atmosphere.

=== Dissolution and aftermath ===
Due to these evolutions and the excessive activism of opponents, on November 17 the SCF was dissolved on Atatürk's recommendation. Okyar used the pretext that the Turkish people were not yet ready to rule themselves, because of their illiteracy. The real state of things was that those in control of the vested interests created as a result of the one-party system feared the establishment of an era of equal opportunity which would put an end to their privilege.

In any case, in 1930 the political mood in the country was really hostile, also because of two rebellions.

- During the summer of 1930, the Ağrı uprising, part of Kurdish rebellions in the East of the country, exacerbated such resentment. Even if it was finally crushed, together with the dissolution of SCF it caused great instability.
- At the end of the year, on December 23, another rebellion took place in the Aegean region, thus aggravating Atatürk's frustration: the Menemen Incident. It started when a group of dervishes, led by Dervish Mehmet Efendi (a Cretan Muslim who belonged to the suppressed Naqshbandi Sufi order), had taken arms against government soldiers in Menemen, a small town near Izmir. It represented a conservative rebellion against secularism, called by Kemalists "reaction" (in Turkish: irtica).

These events and the dissolution of the Liberal Party convinced Atatürk of the necessity to consolidate CHP's power in order to maintain and reinforce his Revolution.

As a result of this political instability, the Assembly decided to hold a new election to prove that the Kemalists represented the majority of the nation. As a way to pretend some pluralism, Atatürk even reserved thirty seats to men holding independent views so that the government's actions could be examined and criticized. Nevertheless, obviously, the CHF controlled the choice of all other candidates. Therefore, the new Assembly included in its membership some people that did not come from the republican élite. However, in effect it remained a one-party State, at least until 1945 and the birth of the National Development Party (Milli Kalkınma Partisi).

== Local election map of 1930 ==
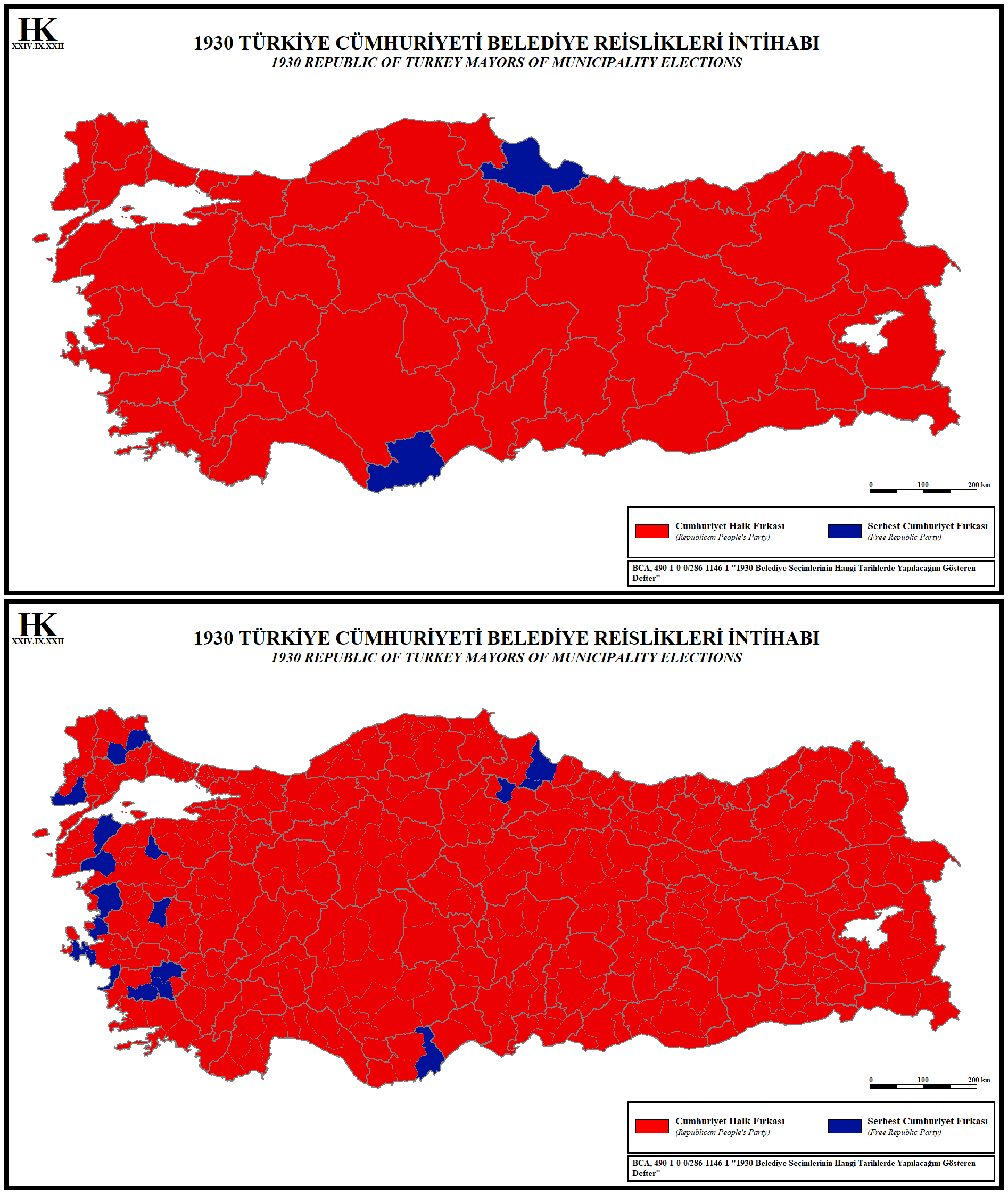

== See also ==
- Fethi Okyar
- Menemen Incident
- Liberal Kemalism
- One-party period of the Republic of Turkey
- Progressive Republican Party
- Republican People's Party
