= Yaban =

1932 novel by Yakup Kadri Karaosmanoğlu

Stranger
- Author: Yakup Kadri Karaosmanoğlu
- Original title: Yaban
- Language: Turkish
- Publication date: 1932
- Publication place: Turkey

Yaban (The Stranger) is a 1932 novel by Turkish author Yakup Kadri Karaosmanoğlu.

The book tells the story of Ahmet Celal, a retired Turkish officer and an intellectual, who leaves Istanbul after its occupation by the British army in 1918 and heads for the rustic village of one of his soldiers in central Anatolia. In this anti-pastoralist account, he finds that he is not welcomed by the peasants, although he once idealised them. Instead, he is sharply critical of the villagers' religious fundamentalism and their lack of patriotism toward the nationalist cause, even as the Turkish Army under Mustafa Kemal Atatürk is getting closer to realising its goal of achieving total independence. As he spends time in the village, he becomes more and more isolated by the local inhabitants and loses his personal war. The novel expresses a commonly ignored side to the National Movement of those days, opposing the general air of optimism which is said to have been dominant in the struggle for independence and shows the instability of Turkish unity in 1918.
