= İsmail Hüsrev =

İsmail Hüsrev Tökin was a Turkish Marxist and Kemalist who wrote for Aydınlık, Resimli Ay and Kadro. He was a colleague of Vedat Nedim Tör.

By 1921, Hüsrev was one of the main authors for Aydınlık, the paper of the Marxist Turkish Workers and Peasants Socialist Party. After the 1927 persecutions of the left, Hüsrev broke any such ties. Soon, he wrote for Resimli Ay, Zekeriya Sertel’s paper around which Liberal Kemalism grew up. Soon enough, the Left-Kemalists wanted their own paper and Hüsrev became on of its core authors. This being Kadro, it rendered Turkish nationalism through Marxism in support of the reform agenda of Mustafa Kemal. With his colleagues Şevket Süreyya and Vedat Nedim Tör, Hüsrev argued against the Kemalist mainstream which said that Turkey was a classless society.
