= Liberal Kemalism =

Form of ideology of the Republic of Turkey

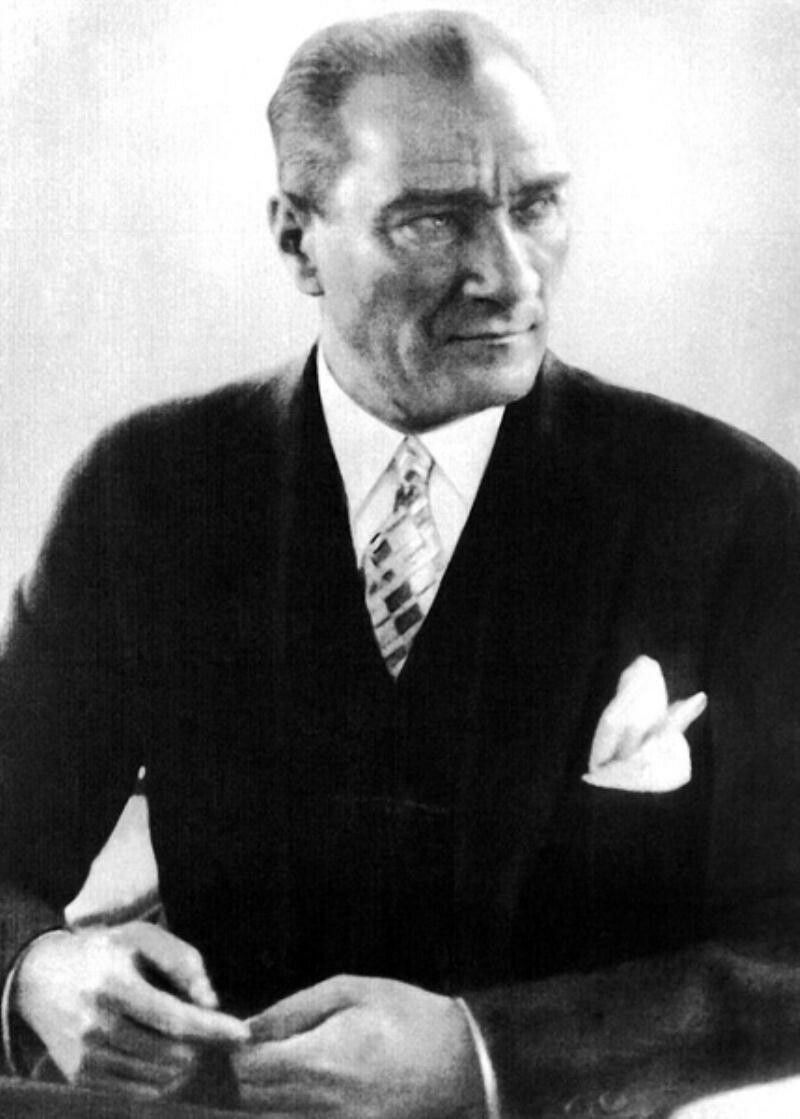
Mustafa Kemal Atatürk, Turkey's founder and first president

Liberal Kemalism is a convergence between Kemalism, the founding ideology of the Republic of Turkey, and the idea of liberalism, which is based on liberty.

Liberal Kemalism is a synthesis of classical liberalism and Kemalism. It was created by Ahmet Ağaoğlu in the 1930s, who was previously a nationalist person.

Most Liberal Kemalists support Kemalist ideas such as secularism, republicanism, and reformism.

Even though Liberal Kemalism was formalised by Ahmet Ağaoğlu, some historians might argue the fact that Atatürk was a liberal too in persona, or a more precisely estimate would be that he was a social liberal or a national liberal, but wasn't able to act on his liberal thoughts for the first decade of the republic because of the shortage of capital. Those historians support this idea with several evidentiary proofs. One of them being an opening speech that Atatürk made on November 1, 1937: "Unless there is an absolute necessity, the markets can't be intervened; also, no markets can be completely free." Secondly, the historians argue the fact that most of the regulations that has been decided at Izmir Economics Congress (1923) were liberal too. And for a final proof, historians say that after the resignation of the prime minister of the time İsmet İnönü, who is known to be a supporter of statist and a more regulated economy, Atatürk's assigning of Celal Bayar – who is known to be a liberal – to the Prime Ministry position in 1937, was indeed an act to make the markets of Turkey more liberal.

== Social opinion ==
Liberal Kemalism defends Atatürk's understanding of nationalism in the social sphere. It is the concept of nationalism, which is also stated in Article 88 of the 1924 Constitution and Atatürk's six principles, and which bases the definition of nation on cultural and political unity, regardless of religion or race.

Liberal Kemalism, just like Kemalism argues that it is necessary to give everyone freedom of conscience, faith and thought.

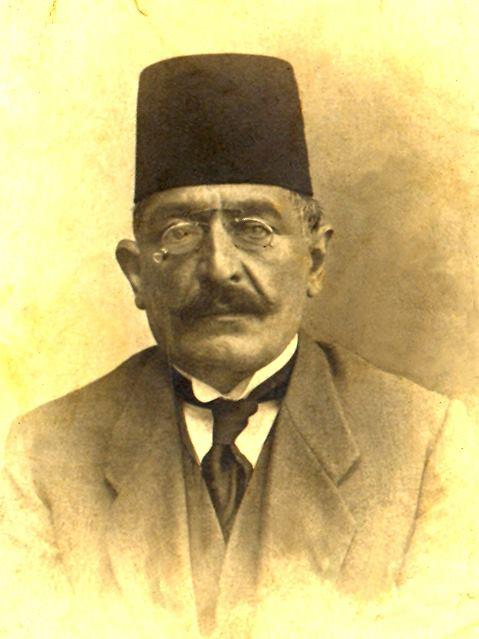
Ahmet Ağaoğlu is regarded as the founder of liberal Kemalism

Liberal Kemalism emerged in the early periods of the republic in Turkey as a result of the interpretation of Kemalist thought from a liberal point of view by Ahmet Ağaoğlu. Ağaoğlu described himself as "Reformist and Kemalist" on the one hand, while trying to develop a "Liberal Kemalism" idea. Ağaoğlu, an advocate of individual freedoms within the Republican People's Party (CHF), criticized some of the party's policies. Later, Ağaoğlu moved away from CHF with his liberal-based ideas and joined the Liberal Republican Party (SCF) at Atatürk's request and was described as one of the most important figures in the SCF, even the ideologue of the party. He did not return to CHF after the Liberal Republican Party closed.

It is seen that the understanding of individualism has an important place in the thought and political life of Ahmet Ağaoğlu, who is one of the important representatives of the enlightened politician model, which was widely seen in the first years of the Turkish Republic. He evaluates his views on modernization, society, democracy, freedom and economy within the framework of individualism. Considering the general political atmosphere both in the country and in the world, it is clear that Ağaoğlu's approach is quite exceptional. In these years when liberalism lost its credibility in the intellectual and political circles, Ağaoğlu insistently advocates that political, economic and social terms principles should be taken as a basis in order for the new state to survive and develop in a strong and healthy way.

== See also ==
- Kemalism
- Liberalism
- Free market economy
