= Kadro =

Political magazine in Turkey (1932–1934)

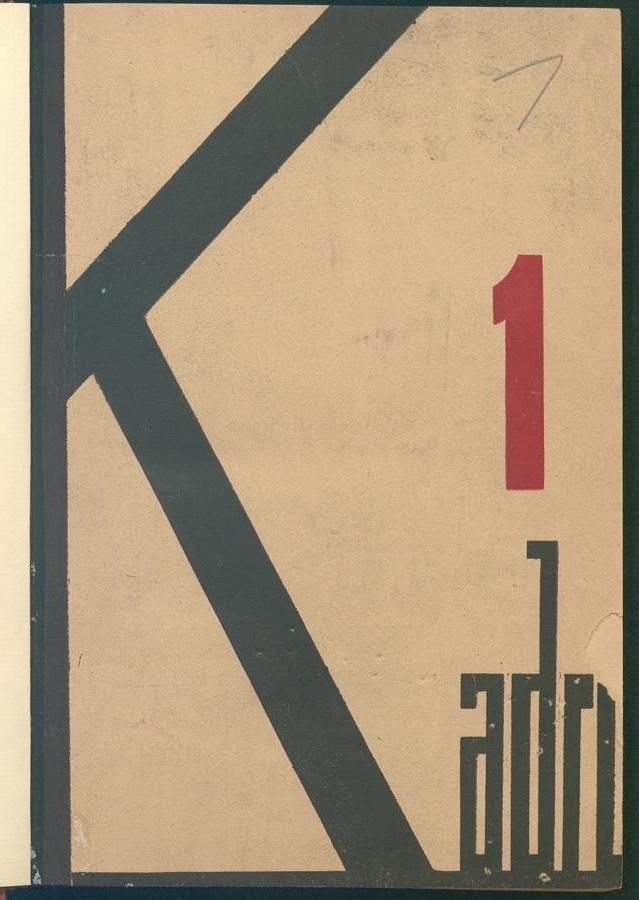
- Categories: Political magazine
- Frequency: Monthly
- Founder: Yakup Kadri Karaosmanoğlu; Şevket Süreyya Aydemir; Vedat Nedim Tör
- First issue: January 1932
- Final issue: December 1934
- Country: Turkey
- Based in: Ankara
- Language: Turkish
- Website: www.kadrodergisi.com

Kadro was an influential left-nationalist and left-Kemalist magazine published in Turkey between January 1932 and December 1934. The title of Kadro translates from Turkish as "cadre" (referring to the "cadre" of intellectuals who were to be the vanguard of the permanent Turkish revolution).

== History and profile ==
Kadro was first published in January 1932. The founders were the members of one of the three major Kemalist factions in the 1930s. They were leading Turkish journalists and authors: Yakup Kadri Karaosmanoğlu, Şevket Süreyya Aydemir and Vedat Nedim Tör. Of them Karaosmanoğlu was also the license holder who asked for permission from Mustafa Kemal Atatürk, President of Turkey, to publish a magazine. Regular contributors of Kadro included Burhan Asaf Belge, İsmail Hüsrev Tökin and Mehmet Şevki Yazman.

Kadro came out monthly. It increased its criticism over the bureaucrats of the ruling party, Republican People's Party, which led to its closure in 1934.

=== Ideology ===
Kadro believed that a Turkish revolution would occur in two stages: the battle to achieve political sovereignty, achieved in the anti-imperialist Turkish War of Independence, and an ongoing battle to liberate the economy and society from imperialist influence. To this end, the Kadro theorists borrowed heavily from Marxist theory.

Kadro's economic and political theories were influenced by a mix of the elements of the Leninist NEP, the elements of a centrally planned economy of the first Soviet Five-year Plan, and the ideas of Soviet Muslim communist Mirsaid Sultan-Galiev. Kadro also supported a comprehensive land reform to redistribute land from big and middle landlords to landless peasants and yeoman farmers. However, unlike the collectivization in the Soviet Union, the proposal of the Kadro theorists did not include the abolition of private land ownership in Turkey. Kadro developed a unique variant of nationalism in the 1930s that focused on national liberation and opposing imperialist powers. The Kadroist definition of a nation is critical of Ziya Gökalp's definition, which focuses on race, ethnicity, culture, and religion. The Kadroists believed the Turkish national identity is multi-faceted, as they believe nations can also be defined by their technological development and level of economic integration. The Kadroist writers theorized the idea of the existence of two main categories of countries: the industrialized and the non-industrialized countries.

Kadro writers believe Turkey's status as a non-industrialized country makes its development of national industries with state power to prevent private interests from emerging via statist and developmentalist policies of the ruling Kemalist regime necessary. Kadro theorists also believe the policies implemented by the Turkish state were crucial to apply to Turkey's national conditions to achieve full economic sovereignty from foreign imperialist powers. The main difference between Kadro's economic proposal and the regime's economic policy was that they supported a more substantial state role in the economy with no private sector involvement and full electrification of the country.

The Kadroist theory sharp contrasts with the global capitalist society transition to the socialist society linear model of Classical Marxism. The Kadroists also developed a theory of anti-colonialism, which described Western industrialized countries' economic and social prosperity as the results of the colonial exploitations of their non-industrialized colonial subjects. Kadro theorists also criticized traditional Marxist literature for lacking coverage on the topic of colonialism and the theory of national liberation, despite Kadro writers taking certain inspirations from its theories of class struggle and historical determinism. Notably, the Kadrotheorists believed that they were creating a third (non-capitalist, non-socialist) political doctrine that would be essentially a Turkish form of "social nationalism." Kadro was highly critical of Italian fascism and Nazism, condemning fascism as a racist and imperialist ideology designed to benefit the bourgeoisie of the industrialized nations. However, it also criticized the Marxist rejection of nationalism, arguing national liberation is more than a means to the end and emphasizing the importance of economic self-determination of non-industrialized and colonized nations. The Kadro's interpretation of nationalism can also be seen as a form of social patriotism.

The theorists advocated absolute state control of the economy (statism Turkish: devletçilik, a key element of Kemalist ideology), believing that Turkey could overcome the problem of class conflict if the state never developed a middle and upper class. If the state was in charge of development, class conflict would not arise, as capital would be in the hands of the state, not specific classes.

Kadro was important as it sought to provide Kemalist Turkey with a solid theoretical underpinning. Although Kadro policies were never absolutely adapted, Turkey did pursue a state-centered development strategy. The magazine Kadro led to the creation of a so-called Kadro movement consisting of left-wing political theorists and its journalists took part in the nightly political debates organized by Atatürk.

Although it claimed to be supportive of the government and opposed socialism and communism in principle, many members of Kadro, like Ayedemir, were former TKP members. The magazine was shut down in 1934; economically liberal figures in the government (like Celal Bayar) worked against the Kadro theories, which they found far too leftist.

== See also ==
- Ecevitism
- Kemalism
- Left Kemalism
- National communism
- Yön
- Resimli Ay
- Aydınlık
- Marko Paşa
- İsmet İnönü
- Ismail Gasprinsky
