= Burhan Belge =

Turkish politician (1899–1967)

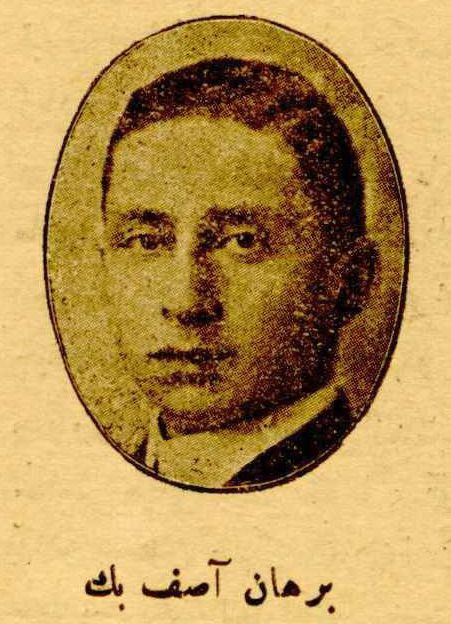
- Born: 1 February 1899; Istanbul, Ottoman Empire
- Died: 12 January 1967 (aged 67)
- Occupations: Politician, Diplomat
- Spouse: Zsa Zsa Gabor (m. 1935; div. 1941)
- Children: Murat Belge

Burhan Belge (1 February 1899 – 12 January 1967) was a Turkish politician and diplomat, who was a prominent figure among the young intellectuals during the early periods of Republic of Turkey and served as the representative of Muğla province during the 11th term of the Turkish National Assembly. He was a regular contributor to Kadro, a left-wing journal dedicated to "discussions on ideology and economic-development strategy." In the 1950s he began to write for the Democrat Party newspaper Zafer.

He is the father of prominent Turkish intellectual Murat Belge and the first husband of actress Zsa Zsa Gabor (from May 1935 to December 1941), whom he met in Hungary while serving as Ambassador of Turkey to Budapest. Gabor was 18 years old when they married and they did not have any children together. He was also a brother-in-law of Yakup Kadri Karaosmanoğlu.

Husband of a Gabor Sister
Preceded by N/A	Zsa Zsa - First; 17 May 1935 – 1941; Divorced	Succeeded by Conrad Hilton
