= Şevket Süreyya Aydemir =

Turkish writer, intellectual, economist, historian (1897–1976)

- Born: 1897; Edirne, Ottoman Empire
- Died: 25 March 1976 (aged 78–79); Ankara, Turkey
- Education: Communist University of the Toilers of the East
- Occupation: Writer
- Political party: Communist Party of Turkey (1920-27)
- Movement: Kadro movement

Şevket Süreyya Aydemir (1897–25 March 1976) was a Turkish writer, intellectual, economist, historian, and one of the founders, publisher and a key theorist of Kadro ("Cadre"), an influential left-wing political journal published in Turkey from 1932 to 1934.

== Life ==
Aydemir, a Pan-Turkist who was previously a member of the Committee of Union and Progress, was educated and became familiar with Marxism at Communist University of the Toilers of the East where he studied economics, and worked as a teacher in Georgia, Azerbaijan, and Russia. He was a member of the Communist Party of Turkey, and attended a Soviet-sponsored Congress for the Peoples of the East in Baku on the Turkish party's behalf. His experience here caused him to distance himself from his previously held internationalist ideas, and later paved the way for him to embrace left-wing Kemalism.

Upon his return to Turkey from the Soviet Union, he wrote for Aydınlık magazine. The magazine was shut down in 1925 for political reasons, and he was sentenced to 10 years in prison by the Ankara Independence Court for the views he had expounded in the magazine. He was released after a year and a half. He was tried again in 1927 but this time was acquitted.

Sobered by his prison experience, Aydemir mixed his Marxist–Leninist leanings with more mainstream nationalist Turkish ideology to create the basis for the Kadro theory. He tried to win Kemalism for a more left-wing policy. Aydemir argued that Turkey—economically subjugated itself at independence—would lead a new world order where former colonies and economically subjugated states would rise up and overcome the hegemony of the industrialized world. This is where the Kadro would come in:

"The ideal [of a completely state oriented economy] can only be achieved under the guidance, as well as the administration of, the devoted, disciplined cadre, which is indifferent to class or individual interests. Such a cadre, which has discerned the principles of the reform and adapted them as moral values, and a reform generation, are needed for the sake of the success of the reform"

Aydemir was a prolific writer. His most famous work was İnkılap ve Kadro ("Revolution and the Cadre"), published in 1932, where he outlined his theory of political economy presented in the Kadro journal. He published his memoirs, Suyu Arayan Adam ("The Man Searching for Water") in 1959. Between 1963 and 1965, he published Tek Adam ("The Single Man"), a three volume tome on Mustafa Kemal Atatürk. He also published a biography of İsmet İnönü titled Ikinci Adam ("The Second Man").

== See also ==
- İsmail Hüsrev
- Vedat Nedim Tör

== Bibliography ==
Aydemir's complete bibliography includes:

- Tek Adam (Mustafa Kemal) – The Single Man, three volumes (biography)
- İkinci Adam (İsmet İnönü) – The Second Man, three volumes (biography)
- Makedonya'dan Ortaasya'ya Enver Paşa – Enver Pasha from Macedonia to Central Asia, three volumes (biography)
- Suyu Arayan Adam – The Man Seeking the Water (autobiography)
- Menderes'in dramı? – Drama of Menderes? (biography)
- İnkılap ve Kadro – Revolution and Cadre(columns)
- Lenin ve Leninizm – Lenin & Leninism (jointly authored)
- Cihan İktisadiyatında Türkiye – Turkey in the World Economy (analysis)
- İktisad Mücadelesinde Köy Muallimi – The Role of the Village Teacher in Economic Struggle (columns)
- Halk İçin İktisad Bilgisi – Knowledge of Economics for the People (columns)
- Türkiye Ekonomisi – The Turkish Economy (research, analysis, textbook)
- Toprak Uyanırsa – If Soil Awakens (novel)
- İhtilalin Mantığı – Logic of Revolution (analysis)
- Kahramanlar Doğmalıydı – Heroes were needed (novel)
- Kırmızı Mektuplar ve Son Yazılar – Red Letters and Last Essays (letters – articles)
- Lider ve Demegog – The Leader and the Demagogue (analysis)
