= Yakup Kadri Karaosmanoğlu =

Turkish novelist, journalist, diplomat, and member of parliament (1889–1974)

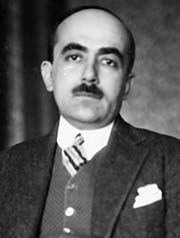
- Born: 27 March 1889; Cairo, Ottoman Empire (today Egypt)
- Died: 13 December 1974 (aged 85); Ankara, Turkey
- Occupations: Novelist, journalist, diplomat
- Relatives: Ayşe Leman Karaosmanoğlu (spouse); Murat Belge (nephew)
- Writing career
- Period: 1909–1974

Yakup Kadri Karaosmanoğlu (also rendered Yakub Kadri; pronounced [jaːˈkup kadˈɾi kaˈɾaosmanoːɫu]; 27 March 1889 – 13 December 1974) was a Turkish novelist, journalist, diplomat, and member of parliament.

== Biography ==
Yakup Kadri Karaosmanoğlu was born in Cairo on 27 March 1889. He was the son of Abdul Kadir Bey, a member of the Karaosmanoğlu family which started to gain a reputation in the 17th century around the Manisa region. His mother was İkbal Hanım, a woman in the palace community of Isma'il Pasha of Egypt. Until the age of six, he was raised in Cairo, after which his family moved to their homeland, Manisa. He completed his primary education in Manisa, and in 1903, the family moved to İzmir.

Karaosmanoğlu was one of the contributors to İkdam during the Turkish War of Independence. After the establishment of the Republic of Turkey in 1923, he served as representative of Manisa in the Grand National Assembly from 1931 to 1934. Karaosmanoğlu was the founding editor-in-chief of the newspaper Tan, which was launched in 1935, and served in the post until 1938. Then until 1955, he served as ambassador of Turkey to various European and Middle Eastern countries.

Following his return to Turkey, he served as the editor of Ulus in 1957. In 1961, he was a representative in the constituent assembly of the National Unity Committee following the 1960 coup d'état. His last political position was again as a representative of Manisa to the Grand National Assembly from 1961 to 1965. In 1966, he was elected chairman of the Anadolu Agency.

Yakup Kadri Karaosmanoğlu died at the Gülhane Military Medical Academy in Ankara on 13 December 1974. He was buried next to his mother's tomb in Yahya Efendi Cemetery in Istanbul.

== Works ==
Yakup Kadri's first work was published in 1913. His novel Yaban (Stranger, 1932) depicts the bitter experiences of a Turkish intellectual, Ahmed Celal, in the countryside after losing his arm in the Battle of Gallipoli. Though categorized as naturalist, the novel has a romantic, anti-pastoral quality.

His novel Panorama analyzes the political, social, and economical changes during the transition period from the Turkish Empire to the Turkish Republic. It is considered to be a "generation novel" as the story is based on the lives of several generations of the same family during this transitional period. The novel is written entirely in Turkish.

He was one of the theorists of the Kadro movement and among the founders of Kadro magazine.

== Personal life ==
Karaosmanoğlu married Ayşe Leman Karaosmanoğlu who was a daughter of Mehmed Asaf Paşa, an Ottoman pasha. Burhan Belge was Leman's brother, and her nephew is Turkish author Murat Belge.

== Bibliography ==
- "Bir Serencam" (An Event or Result) (1913)
- "Kiralık Konak" (The Rented Mansion) (1922)
- "Nur Baba" (Baba Nur) (1922)
- "Rahmet" (Mercy) (1923)
- "Hüküm Gecesi" (Night of Verdict) (1927)
- "Sodom ve Gomore" (Sodom and Gomorrah) (1928)
- "Yaban" (A Wild One) (1932)
- "Ankara" (1934)
- "Ahmet Haşim" (1934)
- "Bir Sürgün" (An Exile ) (1937)
- "Atatürk" (1946)
- "Panorama 1" (1950)
- "Panorama 2" (1954)
- "Zoraki Diplomat" (Forced Diplomat) (1954)
- "Hep O Şarkı" (Always The Same Song)([1956)
- "Anamın Kitabı" (The Book of My Mother) (1957)
- "Vatan Yolunda" (On The Path of the Nation (1958)
- "Politikada 45 Yıl" (1968)
- "Gençlik ve Edebiyat Hatıraları" (Memoirs of Youth and Literature) (1969)
