= Perinçek =

Perinçek is a Turkish surname. It may refer to:

- Doğu Perinçek (born 1942), Turkish politician and lawyer
  - Perinçek v. Switzerland, 2013 judgment of the European Court of Human Rights
- Mehmet Perinçek (born 1978), Turkish historian, political scientist, and professor
- Sadık Perinçek (1915–2000), Turkish politician
