= Luminosity movement =

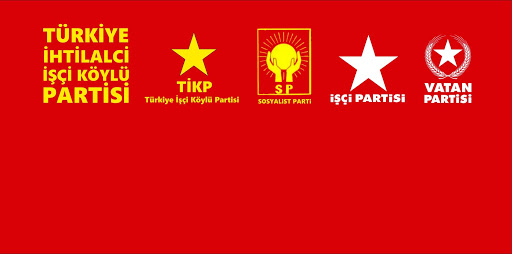
Political parties in Turkey founded by Luminosity Movement

Luminosity Movement, (Turkish: Aydınlık çevresi), is the name of the group that published the Turkish Left and Socialist Luminosity magazines after the 1966 split-up of Turkish Left to Mihri Belli's theory of National Democratic Revolution and Behice Boran's Socialist Revolution. After its 12th issue, Socialist Luminosity had domestical disagreements and the division happened.

== Ideology ==
According to Belli, a revolution should happen in two steps; first, a national democratic revolution which happens in a "military intervention" to the government which should be led by "young officers" in the army, and then a proletariat revolution must follow without any violence and because of the swift, nonstop method of the revolution, the working class would already establish dominance.

Belli and his followers have refused the name given to them as "National Democratic Revolutionaries" and instead adopted the name "Luminosity Movement".

== History ==
Before the 1971 military memorandum, the National Democratic Revolution ideology of Mihri Belli was being heavily supported by Doğan Avcıoğlu's magazines such as Yön and Devrim. Doğan Avcıoğlu's writings were being heavily favoured by some figures in the Turkish military, especially by Muhsin Batur, Faruk Gürler and Cemal Madanoğlu. During the 12 March events, some officers inside of the Turkish military started to plan a coup which aimed to install a communist government led by Faruk Gürler or Muhsin Batur. However, neither of them did not consider these plans into action. They would later on remove the same officers from the military.

However, later on in 9 March, 1971, Cemal Madanoğlu and his followers along with Doğan Avcıoğlu and İlhan Selçuk have attempted a coup which aimed to install a Ba'athist inspired government which was supported by the Luminosity Movement. The group called themselves as "Expanded Command Committee". However, because of the sudden and unplanned methods of this coup attempt, chief of staff Memduğ Tağmaç have been able to stop this coup and successfully arrest any names involved with the Committee along with Devrim writers.

After the 1971 memorandum, those who supported the National Democratic Revolution had been divided into various groups because of domestical disagreements regarding ideological topics. Those who have supported Mehmet Ali Aybar and his ideology, which supported that National Democratic Revolution and Socialist Revolution cannot be distinguished and therefore a socialist revolution must be aimed, founded the Turkish Worker's Party.

The other group was led by Mihri Belli, who remained loyal to the idea of National Democratic Revolution is much more realistic regarding Turkish political landscape. This group later on founded Proletarian Revolutionary Luminosity under Doğu Perinçek. And they have later on founded Turkey's Revolutionary Workers-Farmers Party. They also founded Turkey's Worker-Farmer Party for entering legal politics and later on founded Socialist Party, and Worker's Party.

Most of the National Democratic Revolution supporters are now organized under Patriotic Party. They still publish magazines and writings in Luminosity newspaper, Teori journal and National Channel television channel.
