= 2003 Siirt Province by-election =

By-election in the Province of Siirt held in 2003

- March 9, 2003

All 3 seats of the Province of Siirt to the Grand National Assembly of Turkey
- Turnout: 61.77%
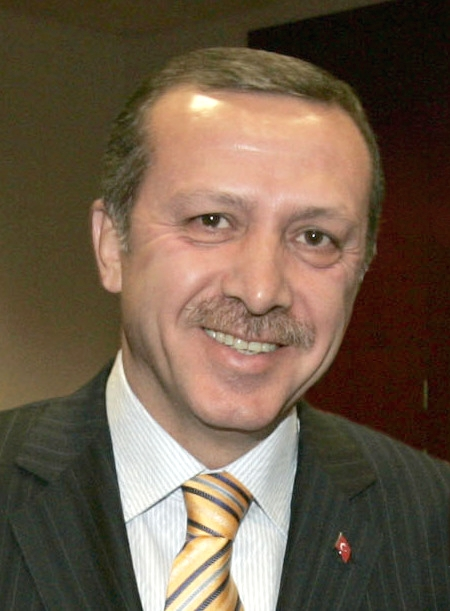

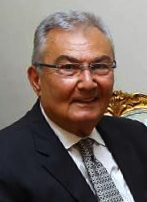

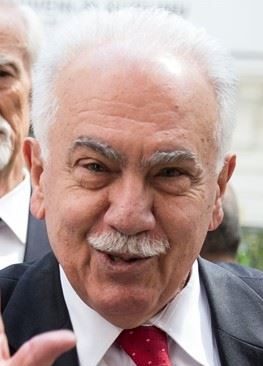
	First party	Second party	Third party
Leader	Recep Tayyip Erdoğan	Deniz Baykal	Doğu Perinçek
Party	AK Party	CHP	İP
Last election	1 seat, 17.56%	1 seat, 8.92%	0 seats, 0.14%
Seats won	3	0	0
Seat change	▲2	▼1	Steady
Popular vote	55,203	8,972	500
Percentage	84.82%	13.79%	0.77%
Swing	▲67.26%	▲4.87%	▲0.63%
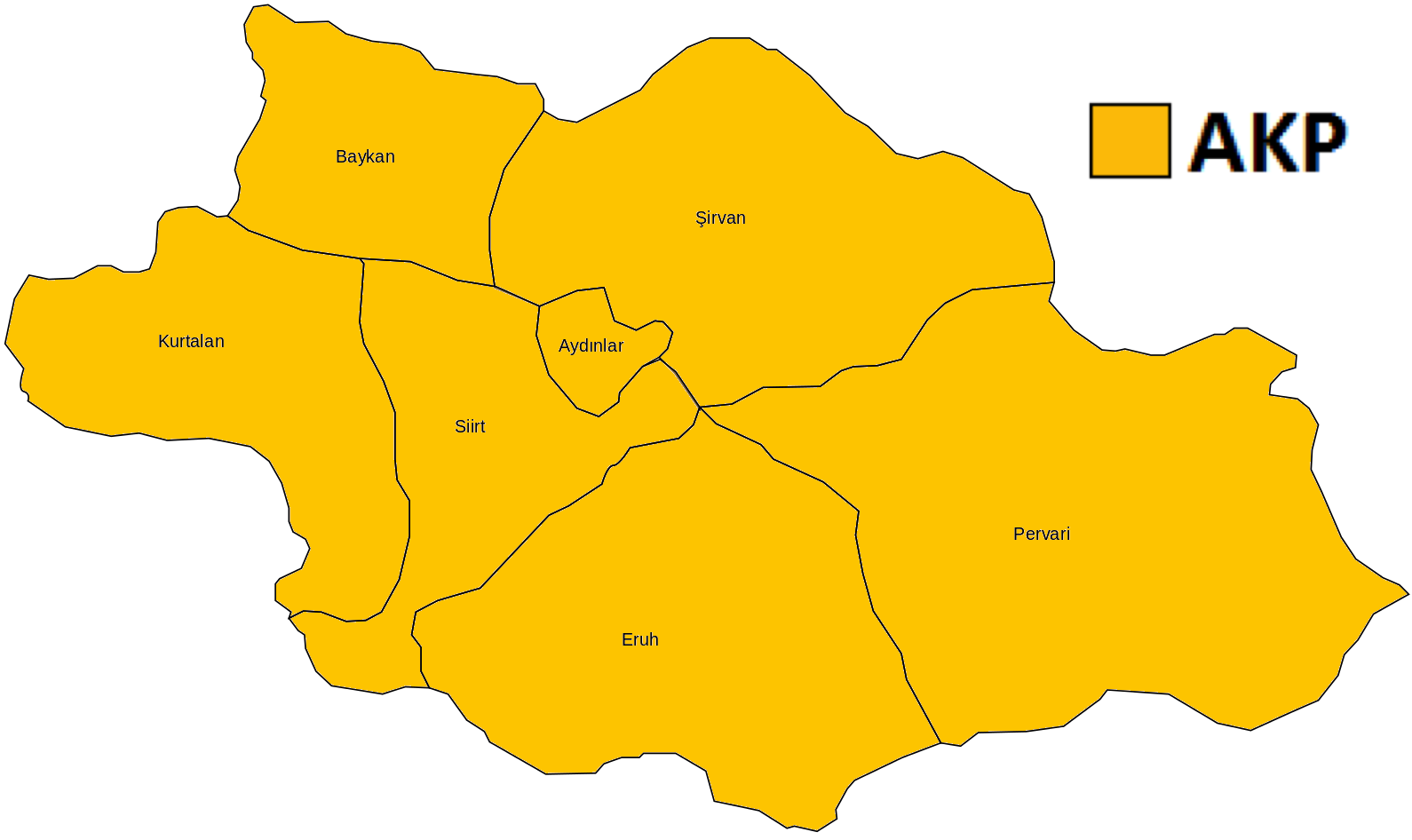
- By-election results by district
Members of Parliament before election
Mervan Gül (AKP)
Mehmet Fadıl Akgündüz (IND)
Ekrem Bilek (CHP)
Elected Members of Parliament
Recep Tayyip Erdoğan (AKP)
Öner Ergenç (AKP)
Öner Gülyeşil (AKP)

The 2003 by-election in the Province of Siirt was held on 9 March 2003 in order to elect three Members of Parliament from the eastern Turkish province of Siirt to the Grand National Assembly of Turkey. The by-election was held four months after the 2002 general election in November, which the Supreme Electoral Council of Turkey declared null and void in Siirt due to voting irregularities in the district of Pervari. The council decided on 2 December 2002 that the complaints by the local electoral authorities had influenced on the election result, thus calling a by-election.

The by-election remains a significant event in Turkish politics, since it allowed Justice and Development Party (AKP) leader Recep Tayyip Erdoğan to run for parliament. Despite having won the 2002 general election with nearly a two-thirds supermajority, Erdoğan had been barred from running for office due to a previous conviction for inciting religious intolerance in 1998. The AKP government, led by the party's co-founder prime minister Abdullah Gül, annulled Erdoğan's political ban and thus allowed him to run in the by-election. Gül subsequently resigned and Erdoğan became the 25th Prime Minister of Turkey on 14 March 2003.

Four parties contested the by-election, as opposed to the 19 that contested the 2002 general election. Similar to general elections, the by-election elected three MPs through a party-list proportional representation system using the D'Hondt method. The parties contesting the election were the Justice and Development Party (AKP), the Republican People's Party (CHP), the Workers' Party (İP) and the Communist Party of Turkey (TKP). The AKP won all three seats up for election with 84.82% of the votes, gaining the two other seats that had been won by the CHP and an independent candidate in November 2002. The CHP came second with 13.79% of the vote and lost their seat despite increasing their vote share since November.

== Background ==
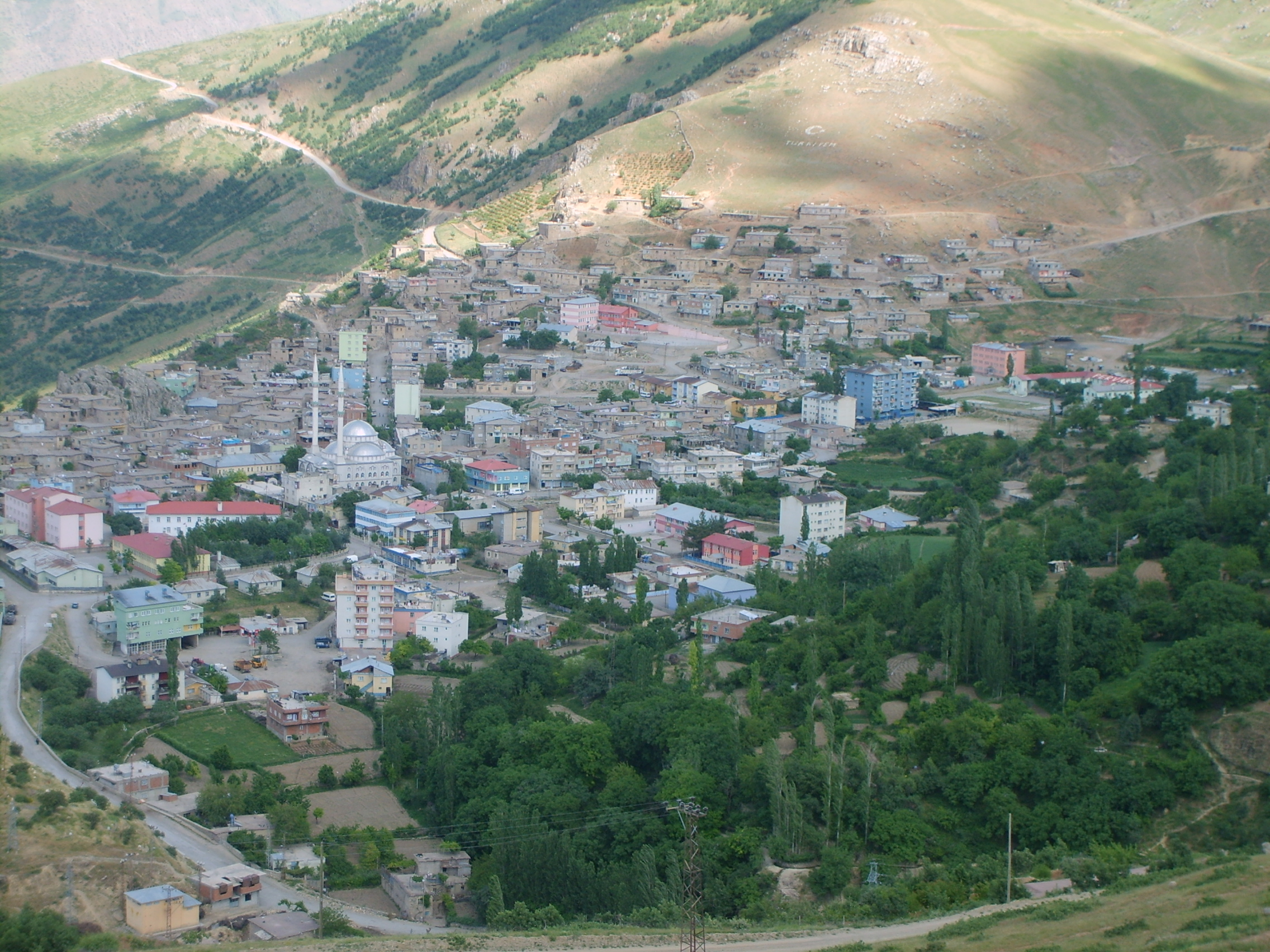
The Pervari district of Siirt, where alleged irregularities occurred

The Province of Siirt is a province in the south-east Anatolia region of Turkey with a predominantly Kurdish population. With an electorate in 2003 of approximately 119,198, it elects three of the 550 MPs to the Grand National Assembly. In the 2002 general election, the province was won by the Kurdish nationalist Democratic People's Party (DHP), which gained 32.17% of the votes. Since the party polled below 10% nationally, it was unable to win any parliamentary seats. According to the Turkish electoral system, the DHP's votes were allocated to the winning party of the election, namely the Justice and Development Party (AKP), which had come second with 17.56% of the vote. Turkish businessman Fadıl Akgündüz was elected as an independent with 13.65% of the votes, coming third. The CHP came fifth with 8.92% of the vote, but won the province's final MP since it was the only other political party apart from the AKP to poll above 10% nationwide.

Siirt shown within Turkey

In the 2002 general election, Recep Tayyip Erdoğan's AKP won 363 seats in Parliament and formed the first single-party government since 1987. While serving as Mayor of Istanbul in 1998, he had been convicted of reciting a poem which incited religious intolerance in Siirt and sentenced to 10 months in prison. After serving four months, Erdoğan founded the AKP in 2001 as a moderately Islamist political party, capitalising on voter dissatisfaction with the existing political parties and their poor economic records. His imprisonment forced him to give up the mayoralty and resulted in a political ban. Despite being the AKP leader, Erdoğan was unable to seek parliamentary election in 2002 and thus the party's co-founder Abdullah Gül became prime minister instead. With the help of the opposition CHP, Gül pushed forward constitutional reforms which nullified Erdoğan's political ban and allowed him to run for office.

== Election ==
The by-election was held on 9 March 2003, four months after the 2002 general election. Four parties contested.

=== Irregularities in the 2002 general election ===
The local electoral authorities investigated irregularities in the district of Pervari in south-eastern Siirt. The alleged irregularities were the fact that three ballot boxes in a village named Doğan Köy were broken and thus could not be voted in, meaning 706 voters boycotted the election in protest. The number was significant since had the AKP won 122 more votes, it would have gained two MPs rather than just one in 2002.

On 2 December 2002, the Supreme Electoral Council of Turkey declared the general election in Siirt null and void and ordered a repeat scheduled for March, citing the broken ballot boxes as having an influence on the results and the subsequent MP distribution. Since Recep Tayyip Erdoğan's political ban had been annulled, the AKP's first candidate Mervan Gül voluntarily stepped aside so that Erdoğan could take his place. Gül subsequently became the AKP Mayor of Siirt in the 2004 local elections.

=== Candidates ===
The Workers' Party legally contested Erdoğan's candidacy, claiming that the by-elections were a repeat of the general elections and thus the party candidate lists could not be changed. This complaint was rejected by the Supreme Electoral Council. The council further ruled that independent candidates which did not run in 2002 would not be able to declare their candidacy in the by-election.

The party candidate lists were as follows.

Justice and Development Party (AKP)
Rank	Candidate
1st	Recep Tayyip Erdoğan
2nd	Öner Gülyeşil
3rd	Öner Ergenç

Republican People's Party (CHP)
Rank	Candidate
1st	Ekrem Bilek
2nd	Abdulhalim Çınar
3rd	Abdurrahman Kaysi

Workers' Party (İP)
Rank	Candidate
1st	Zeki Karahan
2nd	Yusuf Çelik
3rd	Bayram Yurtçiçek

Communist Party of Turkey (TKP)
Rank	Candidate
1st	Muharrem Mırık
2nd	Emine Serpil Renda
3rd	Deniz Ünver

== Results ==
Party	Votes	%	Seats	+/–
Justice and Development Party	55,203	84.82	3	+2
Republican People's Party	8,972	13.79	0	–1
Workers' Party	500	0.77	0	0
Communist Party of Turkey	404	0.62	0	0
Total	65,079	100.00	3	0
Valid votes	65,079	88.39		
Invalid/blank votes	8,545	11.61		
Total votes	73,624	100.00		
Registered voters/turnout	119,198	61.77		
Source: Tesav

=== By district ===
Aydınlar
Party	Votes	%
AKP	1,493	94.2
CHP	89	5.6
İP	3	0.2
TKP	0	0.0
Total	1,585*	100.0

Baykan
Party	Votes	%
AKP	6,728	88.0
CHP	789	10.3
İP	75	1.0
TKP	57	0.7
Total	7,649	100.0

Eruh
Party	Votes	%
AKP	3,294	63.7
CHP	1,809	35.0
İP	40	0.8
TKP	32	0.6
Total	5,175	100.0

Kurtalan
Party	Votes	%
AKP	10,862	85.8
CHP	1,596	12.6
İP	110	0.9
TKP	90	0.7
Total	12,658	100.0

Siirt city centre
Party	Votes	%
AKP	20,409	86.7
CHP	2,802	11.9
İP	171	0.7
TKP	156	0.7
Total	23,538	100.0

Pervari
Party	Votes	%
AKP	6,211	81.0
CHP	1,322	17.2
İP	81	1.1
TKP	54	0.7
Total	7,668	100.0

Şirvan
Party	Votes	%
AKP	6,206	91.1
CHP	565	8.3
İP	20	0.3
TKP	15	0.2
Total	6,806	100.0

* The number of valid votes recorded for Aydınlar is recorded as higher than the number of votes cast (1,460). The actual results in this district are therefore disputed.

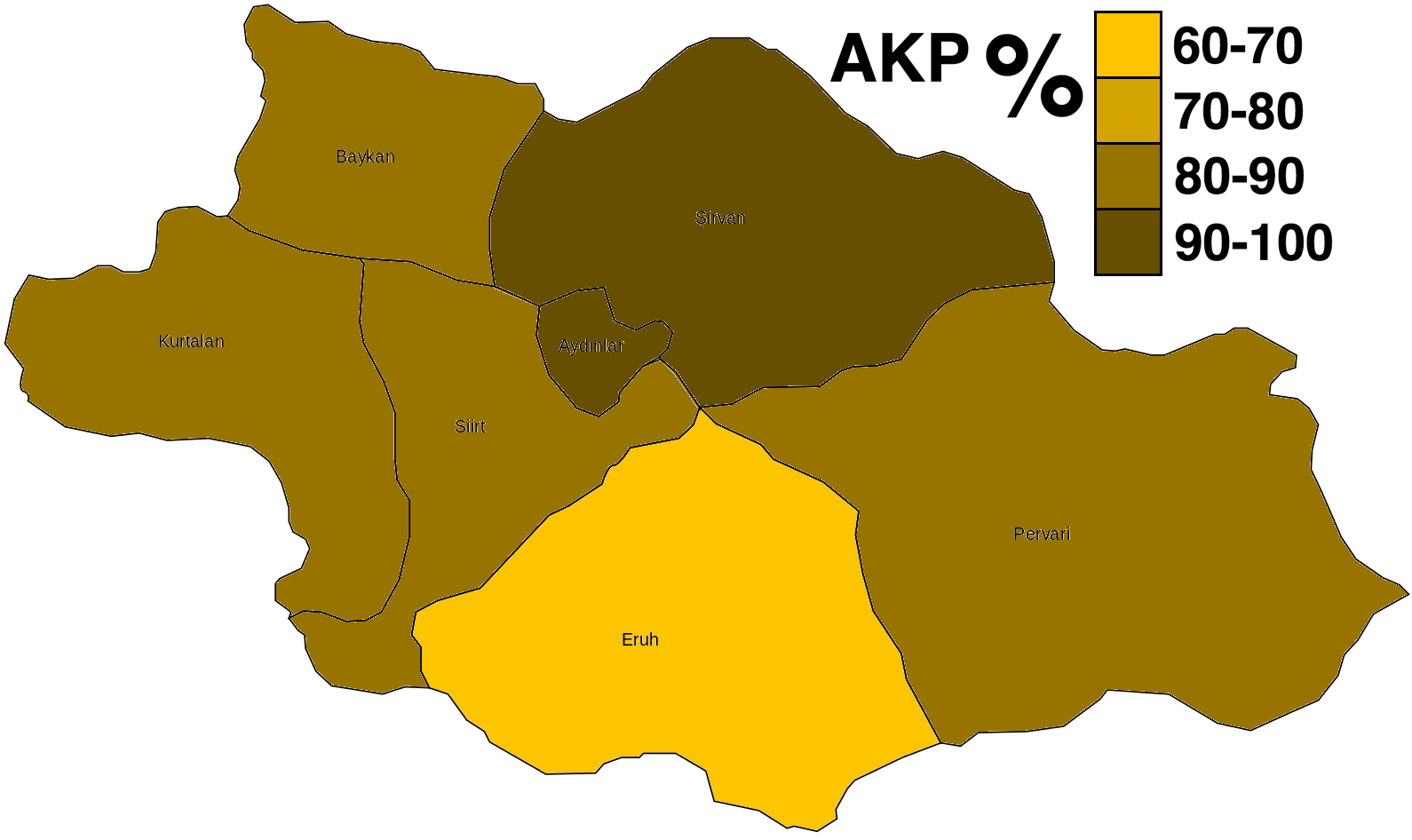
Results obtained by Justice and Development Party (AKP) by district.

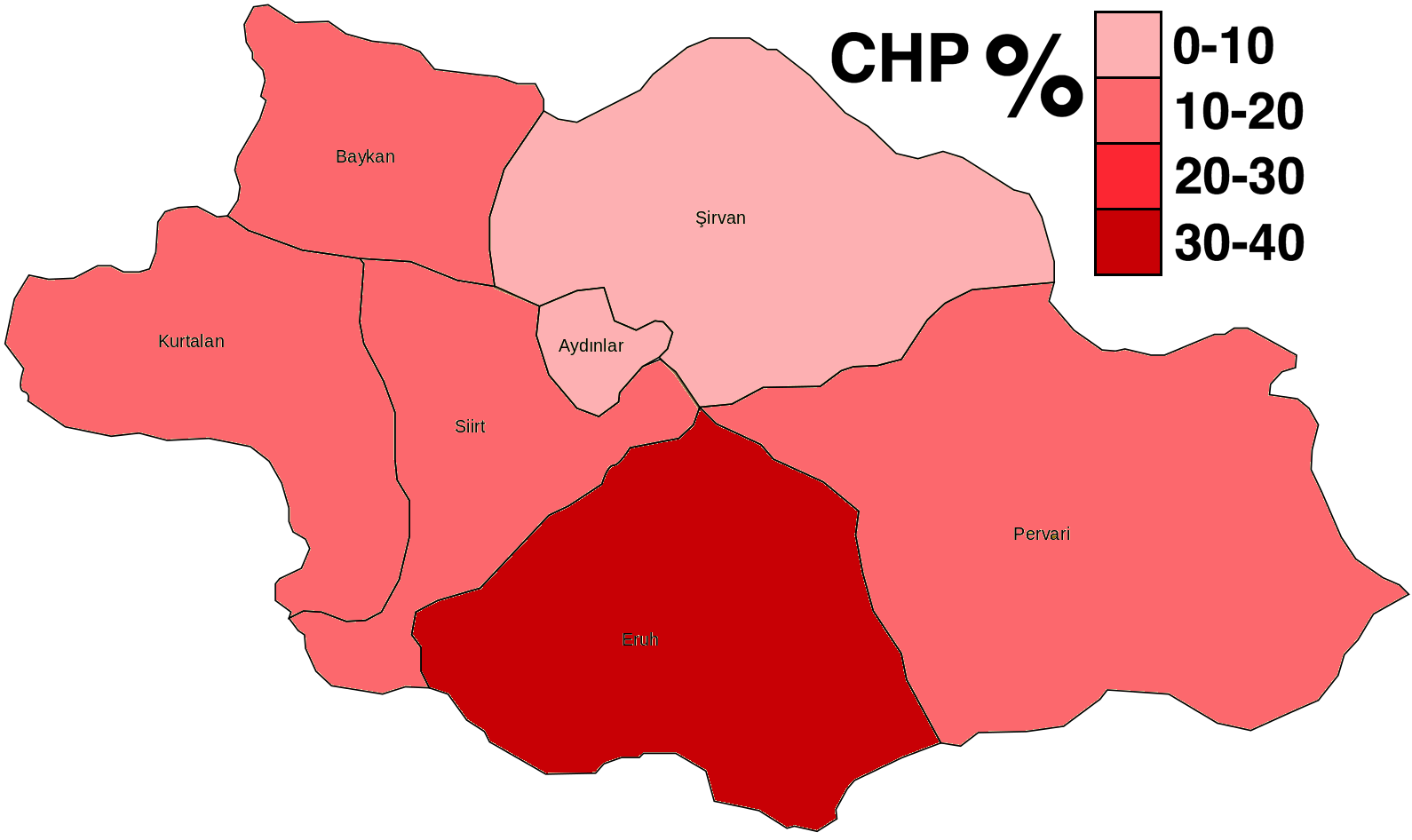
Results obtained by Republican People's Party (CHP) by district.

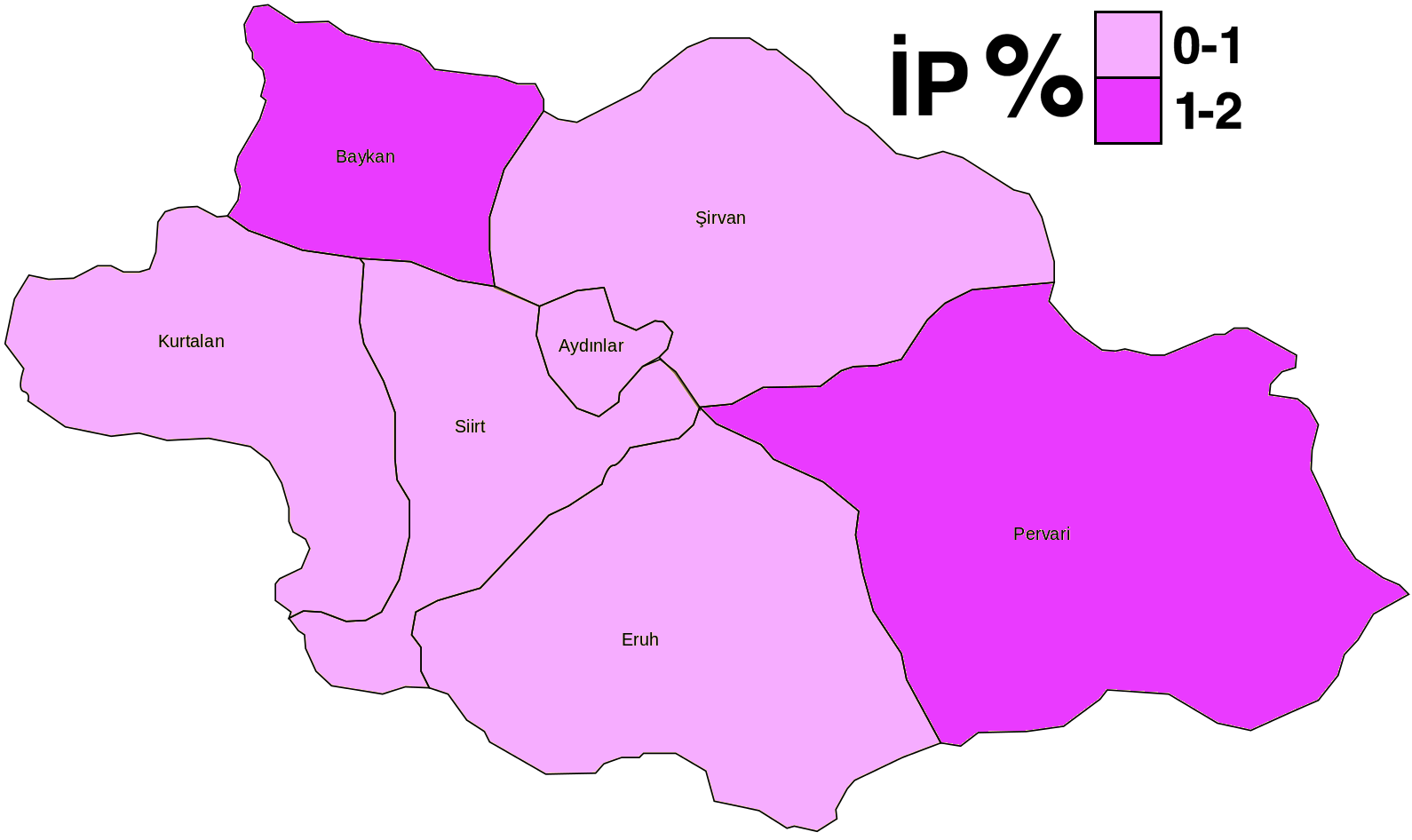
Results obtained by Workers' Party (İP) by district.

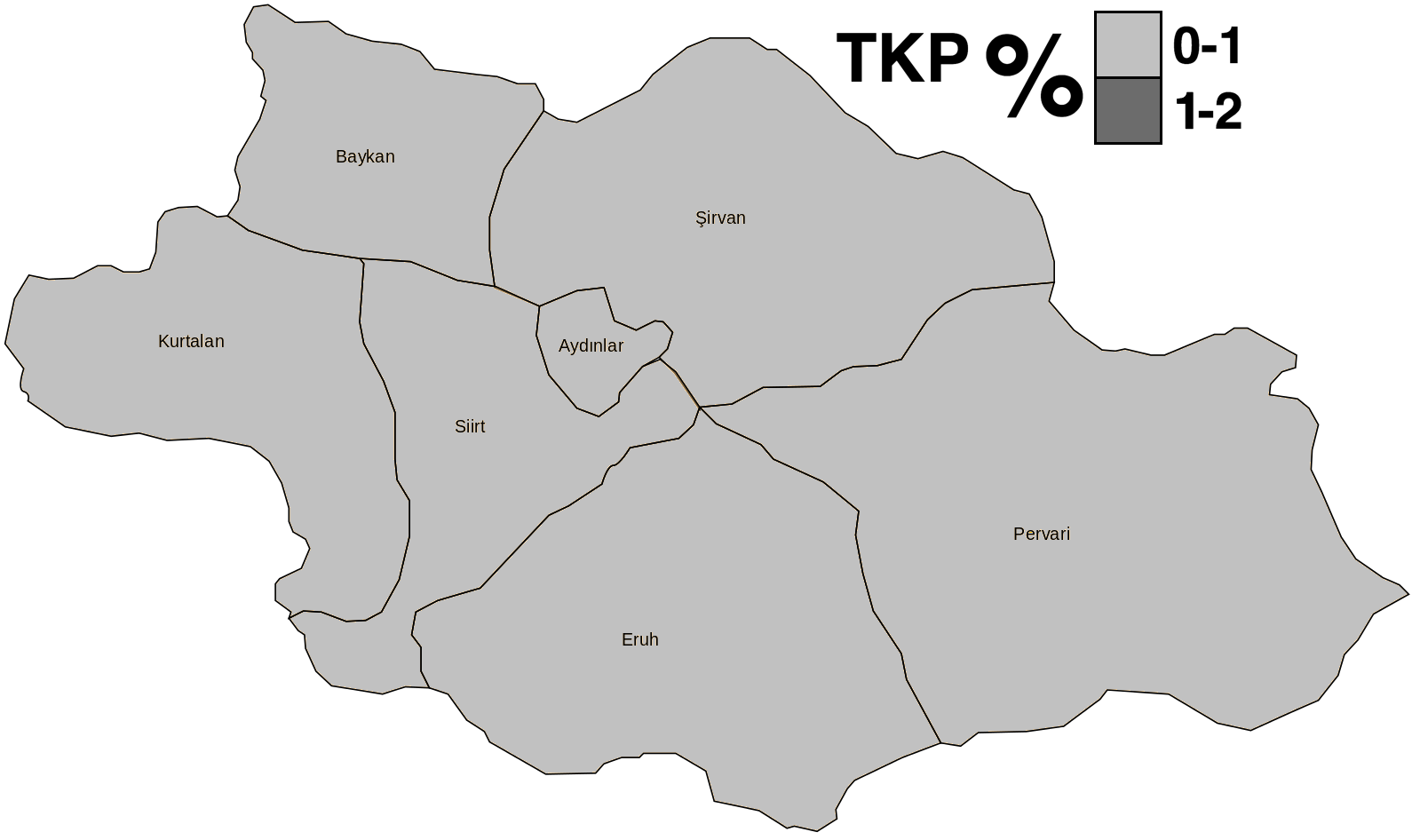
Results obtained by the Communist Party (TKP) by district.

== Controversies ==
Critics of the AKP have often accused the government of deliberately forcing the Supreme Electoral Council to call a by-election so that Erdoğan could become prime minister. Despite allegations that ballot boxes were broken, the residents of Doğan Köy refused to vote until their village received the support it needed during periods of heavy snow, putting the reasons for their boycott in question. The AKP government began a heavy snow clearing operation in the village before the by-election. The initial complaints that ballot boxes had been broken had been made by the AKP. Controversies regarding the exact reasons why the AKP's initial candidate Mervan Gül stepped down, as well as the Supreme Electoral Court's decision to ban Fadıl Akgündüz from running again as an independent due to an arrest warrant from Interpol have also generated criticism.

=== Electoral fraud ===
The election results in the district of Aydınlık show that the number of valid votes (1,585) is higher than the total number of votes cast (1,460), meaning that there was a negative number of invalid/blank votes. This has raised questions about electoral conduct during the election.
