= Siirt (electoral district) =

Electoral district for the Grand National Assembly of Turkey

- electoral district for the Grand National Assembly of Turkey
- Siirt shown within Turkey
- Province: Siirt
- Electorate: 201.853

Current electoral district
- Created: 1920
- Seats: 3 Historical: 5 (1987-1991) 4 (1961-1987) 4 (1957-1961) 4 (1954-1957)
- MPs: List: Mervan Gül AK Party Tuncer Bakırhan DEM Party Sabahat Erdoğan Sarıtaş DEM Party
- Turnout at last election: %83,36
- Representation
- DEM: 2 / 3
- AK Party: 1 / 3

Siirt is an electoral district of the Grand National Assembly of Turkey. It elects three members of parliament (deputies) to represent the province of the same name for a four-year term by the D'Hondt method, a party-list proportional representation system.

== Members ==
Population reviews of each electoral district are conducted before each general election, which can lead to certain districts being granted a smaller or greater number of parliamentary seats. Siirt's seat allocation has been remained unchanged at three seats since 1991.

Siirt is distinctive as being the site of a by-election, a rarity in Turkish politics, which in 2003 saw Recep Tayyip Erdoğan elected to parliament after a law barring candidates with criminal convictions from standing was amended. Erdoğan subsequently became prime minister.

More recently, Siirt was a district where the pro-Kurdish Peace and Democracy Party (BDP) ran independent candidates in an attempt to overcome the 10 percent national electoral threshold. One independent candidate was elected here in 2011 and has since joined the BDP.

MPs for Siirt, 1999 onwards
Seat	1999 (21st parliament)	2002 (22nd parliament)	2003 (by-election) (22nd parliament)	2007 (23rd parliament)	2011 (24th parliament)	June 2015 (25th parliament)
MP	Nizamettin Sevgili; Motherland	Mervan Gül; AK Party	Recep Tayyip Erdoğan; AK Party	Afif Demirkıran; AK Party		Yasin Aktay; AK Party
MP	Takiddin Yarayan; DYP	Ekrem Bilek; CHP	Öner Ergenç; AK Party	Mehmet Yılmaz Helvacıoğlu; AK Party	Osman Ören; AK Party	Hatice Seviptekin; HDP
MP	Ahmet Nurettin Aydın; FP	Fadıl Akgündüz; Independent	Öner Gülyeşil; AK Party	Osman Özçelik; Independent	Gültan Kışanak; Independent	Kadri Yıldırım; HDP

== General elections ==
=== 2002 ===
This election was successfully challenged by the AK Party arguing that a boycott by in villagers in Doğan, near Pervari in Siirt, and the absence of an electoral board for the region rendered the vote invalid. A fresh ballot was held on 9 March 2003.

2002 Turkish general election: Siirt
List	Candidates	Votes	Of total (%)	± from prev.
DHP	None elected	26,980	32.17	'"`UNIQ−−ref−0000000D−QINU`"'
AK Party	Mervan Gül	14,728	17.56	'"`UNIQ−−ref−0000000E−QINU`"'
Independent	Mehmet Fadıl Akgündüz	11,450	13.65	N/A
ANAP	None elected	8258	9.85	
CHP	Ekrem Bilek	7481	8.92	
MHP	None elected	5979	7.13	
DYP	None elected	3993	4.76	
SAADET	None elected	1402	1.67	'"`UNIQ−−ref−0000000F−QINU`"'
GP	None elected	954	1.14	N/A
Büyük Birlik	None elected	607	0.72	
DSP	None elected	400	0.48	
YP	None elected	392	0.47	N/A
BTP	None elected	328	0.39	N/A
YTP	None elected	198	0.24	N/A
MP	None elected	194	0.23	
ÖDP	None elected	161	0.19	
Liberal Democrat	None elected	154	0.18	
İP	None elected	116	0.14	
TKP	None elected	80	0.1	N/A
Turnout		83,855	74.15	

=== 2003 ===
Siirt by-election, 9 March 2003
List	Candidates	Votes	Of total (%)	± from prev.
AK Party	Recep Tayyip Erdoğan, Öner Ergenç, Öner Gülyeşil	55,203	84.82	67.26
CHP	None elected	8972	13.79	4.86
İP	None elected	500	0.77	0.63
TKP	None elected	404	0.62	0.53
Turnout		73,624	61.77	−12.38

=== 2007 ===
2007 Turkish general election: Siirt
List	Candidates	Votes	Of total (%)	± from prev.
AK Party	Afif Demikıran, Osman Özçelik	44,836	48.78	−36.05
Independent	Osman Özçelik	36,320	39.51	25.86
CHP	None elected	3181	3.46	−1.33
DP	None elected	2674	2.91	−1.85
MHP	None elected	2546	2.77	−4.36
SAADET	None elected	884	0.96	−0.71
HYP	None elected	360	0.39	N/A
BTP	None elected	257	0.28	−0.11
ATP	None elected	218	0.24	N/A
TKP	None elected	179	0.17	−0.6
İP	None elected	152	0.17	−0.6
GP	None elected	149	0.16	−0.98
ÖDP	None elected	88	0.1	−0.1
Liberal Democrat	None elected	75	0.08	−0.1
Turnout		91,919	79.77	18.0

=== 2011 ===
2011 Turkish general election: Siirt
List	Candidates	Votes	Of total (%)	± from prev.
AK Party	Afif Demirkıran, Osman Ören	58,623	48.03	−0.74
Independent	Gültan Kışanak	51,809	42.45	2.94
CHP	None elected	3,520	2.88	−0.58
Büyük Birlik	None elected	1,952	1.6	
HAS Party	None elected	1,433	1.18	N/A
MHP	None elected	1,433	1.17	−1.6
DSP	None elected	1,263	1.03	−2.43'"`UNIQ−−ref−0000001D−QINU`"'
SAADET	None elected	911	0.75	−0.22
DP	None elected	503	0.41	−2.5
TKP	None elected	344	0.28	0.09
Nationalist Conservative	None elected	86	0.07	
MP	None elected	85	0.07	
Liberal Democrat	None elected	73	0.06	−0.02
DYP	None elected	0		
HEPAR	None elected	0		
Labour	None elected	0		
Turnout		122,045	81.82	2.05

=== June 2015 ===
Abbr.	Party	Votes	%
HDP	Peoples' Democratic Party	93,518	65.8%
AK Party	Justice and Development Party	40,137	28.2%
MHP	Nationalist Movement Party	3,389	2.4%
CHP	Republican People's Party	1,735	1.2%
	Other	3,438	1.3%
Total		142,217	
Turnout		86.72	
source: YSK

=== November 2015 ===
Abbr.	Party	Votes	%
HDP	Peoples' Democratic Party	81,702	58.3%
AK Party	Justice and Development Party	51,409	36.7%
CHP	Republican People's Party	2,314	1.7%
MHP	Nationalist Movement Party	2,104	1.5%
	Other	2,670	1.9%
Total		140,199	
Turnout		85.53	
source: YSK

=== 2018 ===
Abbr.	Party	Votes	%
HDP	Peoples' Democratic Party	76,225	52.1%
AK Party	Justice and Development Party	55,890	38.2%
MHP	Nationalist Movement Party	4,905	3.4%
IYI	Good Party	2,181	1.5%
CHP	Republican People's Party	2,990	2%
HÜDA-PAR	Free Cause Party	1,776	1.2%
SP	Felicity Party	1,355	0.9%
	Other	945	0.6%
Total		146,267	
Turnout		84.26	
source: YSK

=== 2023 ===
Abbr.	Party	Votes	%
YSGP	Party of Greens and the Left Future	77.267	45.9%
AK Party	Justice and Development Party	59.553	35.9%
CHP	Republican People's Party	12.843	7.7%
MHP	Nationalist Movement Party	6.462	3.9%
IYI	Good Party	2.482	1.5%
YRP	New Welfare Party	1.958	1.2%
	Independent	1.268	0.8%
	Other	3.891	2.3%
Total		168.261	
Turnout		%83,36	
source: YSK

== Presidential elections ==
=== 2014 ===
Presidential Election 2014: Siirt
Party	Candidate	Votes	%
HDP	Selahattin Demirtaş	65,500	54.07
AK Party	Recep Tayyip Erdoğan	51,379	42.41
Independent	Ekmeleddin İhsanoğlu	4,257	3.51
Total votes		121,136	100.00
Rejected ballots		2,371	1.92
Turnout		123,507	74.70
Selahattin Demirtaş win			
