= Post-Kemalism =

Post-Kemalism, especially in Turkish academia and political debate, is a movement that argues that the source of Turkey's political and cultural problems, especially democratization, lies in the military-bureaucratic İttihadist and Kemalist ideology, and its basis is questioning Turkish official historiography. The post-Kemalist movement, which emerged after coup of 1980, became the center of Turkish historiography with the coming to power of the Justice and Development Party in the 2000s, and started to decline after the 2010s.

== Views of post-Kemalists ==
Post-Kemalists are generally not affiliated with a certain political ideology. Authors supporting various ideologies like socialism, liberalism and conservatism have been described as post-Kemalists. However, this movement, which has a postmodern understanding of history in general, looks at Turkish historiography and the establishment of the Turkish state from a critical perspective. The centre-periphery model, which Şerif Mardin adapted to the conditions of Turkey, lies on the basis of post-Kemalist thought. According to Mardin, the 'centre' made up of the military-bureaucrat class excluded the 'periphery' made up of liberals, socialists, minorities, especially Kurds and traditionalists, and pushed them out of the main stage of Turkish politics. The political 'centre' came into conflict with the 'periphery' in order to maintain its power and realize its modernization mission, and saw them as a threat to itself and tried to suppress this movement. This was seen as the main reason for the military interventions and party closures in Turkey.

In addition, post-Kemalists drew attention to the 'top down' character of the reforms made in the Atatürk period. Various authors have criticized the formalist structure of the reforms and their inability to spread to the society, and have criticized these reforms as the product of an oppressive modernization. For example, issues such as the paternalistic nature of the reforms about women and the Turkish nationalism of the Kemalist regime have been the focus of criticism by the relevant authors.

Post-Kemalists argue that the solution to Turkey's problems, such as democratization and the culture war, can be found by exposing the mistakes of the late Ottoman and Republican eras, after which the 'periphery' will come to power. The periphery, composed of liberals, conservatives and others, will liquidate the tutelary center of military-bureaucrats and take steps towards the democratization of Turkey.

== History ==
While older scholars in the 1980s and 1990s (like Şerif Mardin, Mete Tunçay, or Erik-Jan Zürcher) were doing what we now call post-Kemalist history by criticizing official narratives, they rarely used the literal phrase "Post-Kemalism" to describe themselves or their era. Mucahit Bilici was the first intellectual to conceptualize the term. Thus the first explicit conceptual use of the term "Post-Kemalism" as a defined political and sociological condition was in Mucahit Bilici's 1999 articles. His June 1999 article in Radikal İki ("Küreselleşme ve Post-Kemalizm") and his November 1999 Birikim essay "İthal İkame Oryantalizminin Krizi, Post-Kemalist Durum ve Türban" are the earliest to analyze Turkey's socio-political condition. Ilker Ayturk's use of the term in his work in 2015 therefore is a historiographical labeling that comes much later. After the coup of 1980, researchers such as Şerif Mardin, Mete Tunçay and Erik Jan Zürcher began to question Kemalism and İttihadism by going beyond the official understanding of history. As a result of this critical outlook, many academics were excluded from various positions in the 1980s and 90s. After the 1997 memorandum, post-Kemalist criticism increased.

A turning point in terms of post-Kemalism was the coming to power of the Justice and Development Party in 2002. The fall of the 'military-bureaucratic' order together with the AK Party government has made post-Kemalism the center of Turkish historiography. Events such as the European Union harmonization laws that were put into effect, erasing the traces of the 12 September and 28 February periods, the 2007 constitutional amendments, the Ergenekon and Sledgehammer cases and the Solution Process were described as putting the post-Kemalist understanding into practice.

However, as the AKP government became increasingly authoritarian after 2008, civilian constitutional proposals were not fully implemented, suppression of Gezi Park protests and the failure of Solution Process, the view towards the AK Party changed in Turkish intellectual circles. Some post-Kemalist writers close to the AK Party government have severed their ties with the AK Party and Recep Tayyip Erdoğan. After these events, Turkish historiography started to move away from post-Kemalism.

== Criticism ==
Post-Kemalism has been criticized by various authors since the 1980s. These criticisms first came from writers who identified themselves as Kemalists and then from Marxist writers. They were accused of anti-Kemalism and counter-revolutionism because of their moderate views towards the conservative and Islamist camp. However, post-Kemalists after 2012 have been criticized from different perspectives. According to İlker Aytürk, post-Kemalism ceased to be an opposition and the claim that Turkey's democratization was hindered by the Kemalist military and Kemalist civil bureaucracy lost its validity as the symbols and institutions that were the bearers of Kemalism weakened in the process that started with the AKP coming to power in 2002. The main lines of criticism against post-Kemalists are as follows:

- Although Post-Kemalism questioned the official historiography and revealed its mistakes, Post-Kemalism fell into the same mistake by failing to offer an unbiased understanding instead of the official historiography it criticized, and created a historiography based only on the denigration of Kemalist history. Through anachronism, those who opposed Kemalist authority were glorified in black and white.
- Only the Ittihadist-Kemalist understanding is held responsible for the problem of democratization and pluralism in Turkey, events outside the 1908-1950 period and wider factors are not evaluated, and comparisons with the situation in other countries are not made.
- The coming to power of the 'periphery' did not result in Turkey becoming more democratized; the periphery turned into the center with the AK Party rule. Many post-Kemalist figures have been criticized for the positions they held during the AKP rule and for their silence on the authoritarianization.

=== Post-post-Kemalism ===
Aytürk suggested the term post-post-Kemalism, as the inadequacy of the post-Kemalist paradigm in understanding Turkey and diagnosing the problems has become apparent. He stated that although the period between 1908 and 1938 has been intensively studied, the leftist approaches, the Turkish right, and the Cold War in the period between 1950 and 1980 have not been studied in detail. He argued that part of the inadequacy in interpreting the history of Turkey was due to the omission of the establishment of the national security state during the period when nationalist-secularist governments were dominant.

== Some Post-Kemalists ==
- Mete Tunçay
- Erik-Jan Zürcher
- Şerif Mardin
- Nilüfer Göle
- Taha Parla

== See also ==
- Erdoğanism
- Politics of Turkey
- Islamokemalism
- Secularism in Turkey
- Ulusalism
