= Vanguard Youth =

Vanguard Youth may refer to:

- Vanguard Youth (Vietnam)
- Vanguard Youth (Turkey)
