= Patriotic Party (Turkey) =

Turkish political party

Patriotic Party Vatan Partisi
- Abbreviation: Vatan Partisi (official); VP (unofficial)
- President: Doğu Perinçek
- Secretary-General: Özgür Bursalı
- Founded: 10 July 1992 (as Workers' Party); 15 February 2015 (rebranding)
- Preceded by: Workers' Party
- Headquarters: Toros Sokak 9, 06430; Sıhhiye, Çankaya, Ankara
- Newspaper: Aydınlık
- Think tank: National Strategy Center (USMER)
- Youth wing: Vanguard Youth
- Women's wing: Vanguard Women
- Membership (2026): ▼12,200
- Ideology: Maoism; Socialism; Left-wing nationalism Kemalism; Ulusalcılık; Eurasianism
- Political position: Left-wing
- International affiliation: Sovintern
- Colors: Red; White
- Grand National Assembly: 0 / 600
- Metropolitan municipalities: 0 / 30
- District municipalities: 0 / 1,351
- Provincial councilors: 0 / 1,251
- Municipal Assemblies: 0 / 20,498

Website
- vatanpartisi.org.tr

The Patriotic Party (Note: The party's Turkish name Vatan directly translates to Motherland or Homeland; however the party has adopted the English name Patriotic Party. This is most likely in order not to clash with parties that have a similar name when translated to English, such as the Motherland Party (Anavatan Partisi) or the Homeland Party (Yurt Partisi). Patriotic in Turkish translates to Vatansever or Yurtsever. The party's official short name (abbreviation) is Vatan Partisi, i.e., the same as the name of the party itself. Colloquially the acronym VP is used. The party is not directly related to an earlier, communist party of the same name, founded in 1954, closed by court order in 1957, re-established in 1975 and forced to close again in 1981.) (Turkish: Vatan Partisi, VP) is a political party in Turkey. The Patriotic Party describes itself as a "vanguard party" and its chairman, Doğu Perinçek, described the party in 2015 as a bringing together of socialists, revolutionaries, Turkish nationalists and Kemalists. The party is strongly pro-China and pro-Russia as well as anti-American. The party also supports President Erdoğan and what it considers to be his anti-imperialist policies.

== History ==
The political tradition of the Patriotic Party is based on the Luminosity (Aydınlık) movement. The party was founded in 1992 as Workers' Party. In 2015, after a long-time political repositioning period, the Workers' Party changed its name to "Patriotic Party" during the extraordinary congress. Like the Workers' Party, the Patriotic Party is led by Doğu Perinçek. The party's founding members include former army generals who had been pursued during the Ergenekon trials and the Sledgehammer case, though both cases have been thrown out since then.

== Political positions ==
The party is closely aligned with the nationalist ideology named Ulusalcılık and has been described as left-wing, and left-wing nationalist. It officially supports Kemalism. Article 1 of the Basic Principles section of the party charter states that "The Patriotic Party is the vanguard party fighting for the common national power of the Turkish working class, peasants, artisans and craftsmen, public employees, intellectual laborers, national industrialists and merchants. The Patriotic Party embraces the nationalist, pro-people and socialist accumulation of the Turkish Revolution under a single discipline on the basis of the Party's charter and program."

The party also supports the ruling People's Alliance, which is right-wing and conservative in nature, though it is not a member. Perinçek has stated that "[r]epublicans, nationalists, populists, socialists and revolutionaries all unite in one party, the Patriotic Party". According to its charter, the party advocates for a "national democratic revolution", calls for "ideological independence" and organizes itself on the basis of democratic centralism.

=== Foreign policy ===
The party is strongly pro-Russia and pro-China and anti-American because of its Eurasianist ideology. It is also strongly anti-NATO and advocates for Turkey's departure from it. It is also Eurosceptic and against Turkey's EU candidacy. The Patriotic Party supports strong relations with countries such as Iran and North Korea. It also has strong party-to-party relations with parties such as the Chinese Communist Party and the Workers' Party of Korea.

The party strongly opposes the current Turkish intervention in Syria and promoted better ties with the Assad government. In 2022, the party and its leader, Doğu Perinçek, openly supported Vladimir Putin and the 2022 Russian invasion of Ukraine. saying that "it is the weapon that Russia is currently using that brings peace and tranquility". The party congratulated the Alternative for Germany (AfD) following its victory in the 2026 Saxony-Anhalt state election, and said calling AfD "far-right and racist" was American propaganda.

== Media ==
The Patriotic Party is affiliated with a number of news publications including Aydınlık, Ulusal Kanal and Bilim ve Ütopya.

== Electoral performance ==
=== Parliamentary elections ===
Grand National Assembly of Turkey
Election date	Leader	Votes	%	Seats
June 2015	Doğu Perinçek	161,616	0.35%	0 / 550
November 2015	Doğu Perinçek	118,803	0.25%	0 / 550
2018	Doğu Perinçek	114,872	0.23%	0 / 600
2023	Doğu Perinçek	53,339	0.10%	0 / 600

=== Presidential elections ===
Election	Candidate	Votes	%	Outcome
2018	Doğu Perinçek	98,955	0.20%	6th
2023	Endorsed Erdoğan in the Second Round			

=== Local elections ===
Election	Party leader	Mayoral election votes	Percentage of votes	Municipal councillor votes	Percentage of votes	Number of municipalities	Number of councillors	Map
2024	Doğu Perinçek							

== See also ==
- Youth Union of Turkey

== Notes ==
1. The party's Turkish name Vatan directly translates to Motherland or Homeland; however the party has adopted the English name Patriotic Party. This is most likely in order not to clash with parties that have a similar name when translated to English, such as the Motherland Party (Anavatan Partisi) or the Homeland Party (Yurt Partisi). Patriotic in Turkish translates to Vatansever or Yurtsever. The party's official short name (abbreviation) is Vatan Partisi, i.e., the same as the name of the party itself. Colloquially the acronym VP is used. The party is not directly related to an earlier, communist party of the same name, founded in 1954, closed by court order in 1957, re-established in 1975 and forced to close again in 1981.
