= Kemalist historiography =

Narrative of history promoted by Kemalism

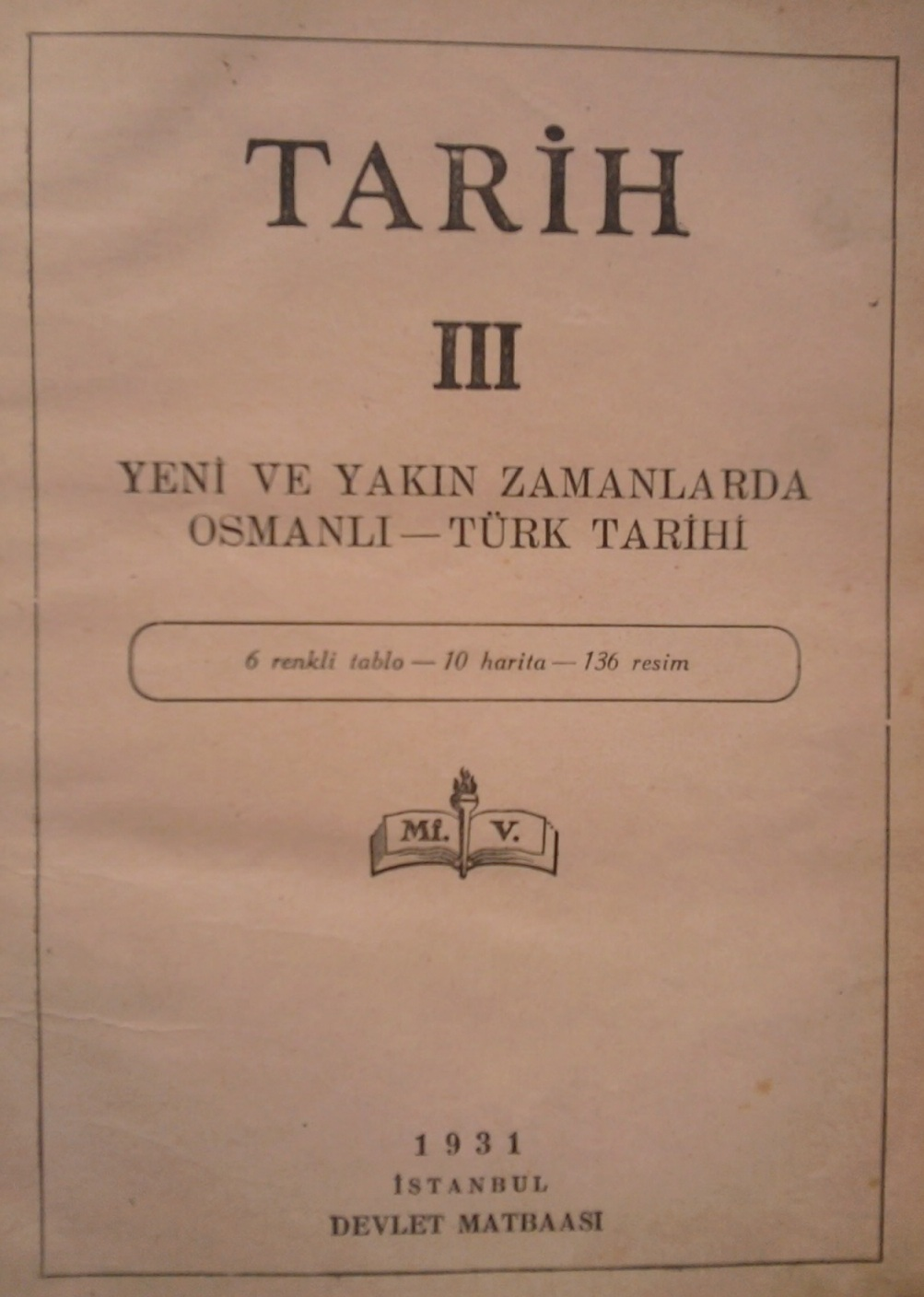
Kemalist history textbook, used between 1931 and 1941.

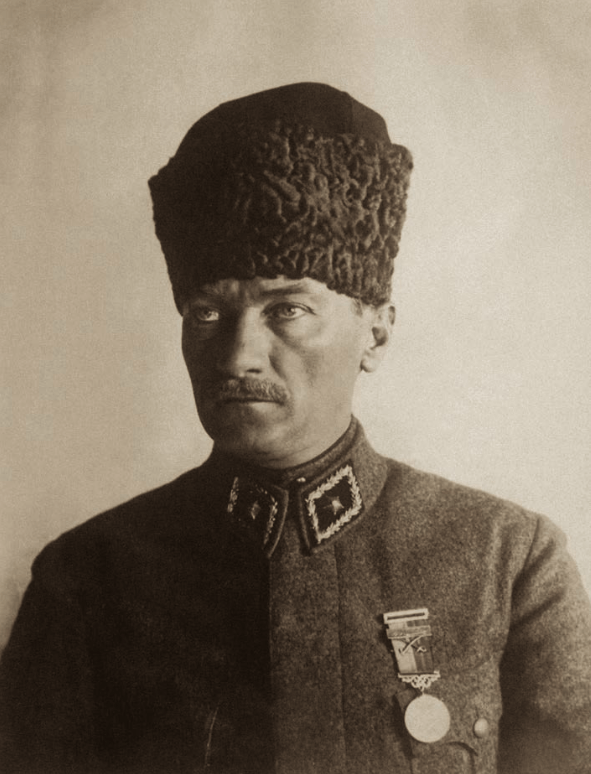
Mustafa Kemal Atatürk, founder of the Republic of Turkey, whose cult of personality is the main influence on Kemalist historiography.

Kemalist historiography (Turkish: Kemalist tarihyazımı) is a narrative of history mainly based on a six-day speech delivered by Mustafa Kemal [Atatürk] (Note: He was granted the surname Atatürk with the surname law of 1934.) in 1927, promoted by the political ideology of Kemalism, and influenced by Atatürk's cult of personality. It asserts that the Republic of Turkey represented a clean break with the Ottoman Empire, and that the Republican People's Party did not succeed the Committee of Union and Progress (CUP).

Kemalist historiography views Ottoman traditions as an obstacle to the introduction of Westernising political reforms, and instead adopts the heritage of pre-Islamic Turks, which it considers to be naturally progressive, culturally pure and uncorrupted. The historiography magnifies Mustafa Kemal's role in the World War I and Turkish War of Independence, and omits or attempts to justify the suffering of religious and ethnic minorities during the late Ottoman Empire and the Turkish Republic, often viewing them as a security threat to the state, or rebels instigated by external powers.

The mainstream historians of this historiography were centrist Kemalists particularly İsmail Hakkı Uzunçarşılı and Enver Ziya Karal, left-wing Kemalists such as Niyazi Berkes and Mustafa Akdağ, right-wing Kemalists like Osman Turan, it was also adopted by Western historians such as Bernard Lewis who took on Kemalist ideas as it is.

Today, Kemalist historiography is embraced and further developed by Turkish neo-nationalism (Ulusalcılık), (Note: This is sometimes referred as "neo-Kemalist historiography" or "neo-Kemalist conspiracy".) and sometimes by anti-Kemalist conservatism and Islamism, especially in the case of Armenian genocide denial.

== Historiography ==
=== Pre-Islamic Turkic people ===
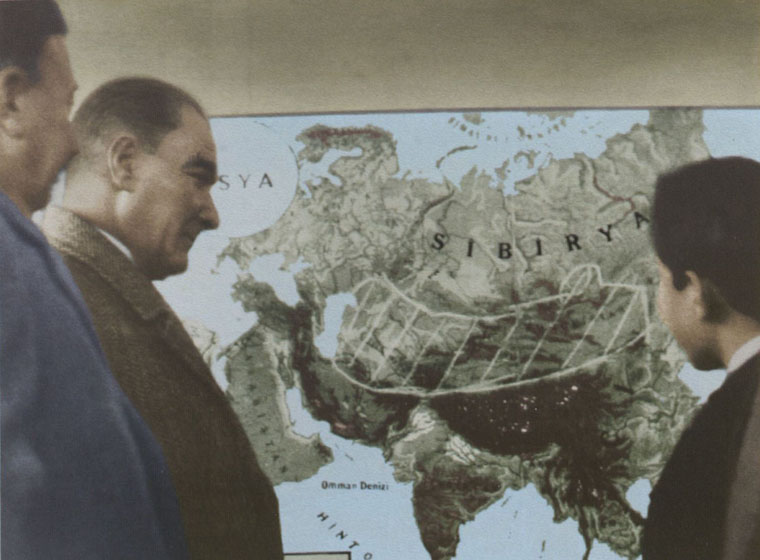
Mustafa Kemal in a geography class in 19 Mayıs Lisesi. The striped area marks the Central Asian Turkic homeland.

Starting with 1920s, the Kemalist regime envisioned a Western-style country, with one of the desired goals being an expansion of women's rights. Entrenched Islamic tradition was seen as an obstacle to introduce such reforms, and in order to subvert them, Turkish ideologue Ziya Gökalp composed a myth, suggesting that old Turkic people had the characteristics of a feminist society. According to him, women of this period had the same rights as their husbands, and were equally active in social life with men. He further asserted that women governed fortresses, participated in trade, and rode horses by themselves. Concurrently, Gökalp thought that modernization and Westernization were not the same things, and that the key concepts of modernization were already rooted deep down in Turkicness. For this reason, he argued that Turkey did not necessarily need to become a part of the West, which he saw dangerously individualist and romanticist, but rather should turn back to their semi-mythical Central Asian origins. Yeşim Arat, a Turkish political scientist specialized in gender politics, comments on the legitimacy of this thesis as such:

This period was idealized, if not invented, to legitimize the Western values of secularism, equality and nationalism that the Turkish project of modernity sought to adopt.

In the 1930s, the Association for the Study of Turkish History (Türk Tarihi Tetkik Cemiyeti) was ordered to publish a history book called Türk Tarihinin Ana Hatları (Outlines of Turkish History) which reflected this "semi-mythical" nationalist historiography. Some nationalist historians of the Republican era claimed that Hittites were Turks, in an attempt to hearken back the origins of the Turks to prehistoric Anatolian civilizations, despite a wide academic consensus that tribal Turks migrated to Asia Minor during the 11th century. The same historiography also attributed the roots of Sumerian, Akkadian, Celtic, Mongolian, Russian, Irish and Chinese people to Turkishness, to suggest that Turks were the ethnicity that spread 'civilization' to the rest of the world.But this thesis later dropped by Kemalist regime, most of the Kemalists today views this theses as self defence against eurocentrism.

=== Ottoman Empire ===
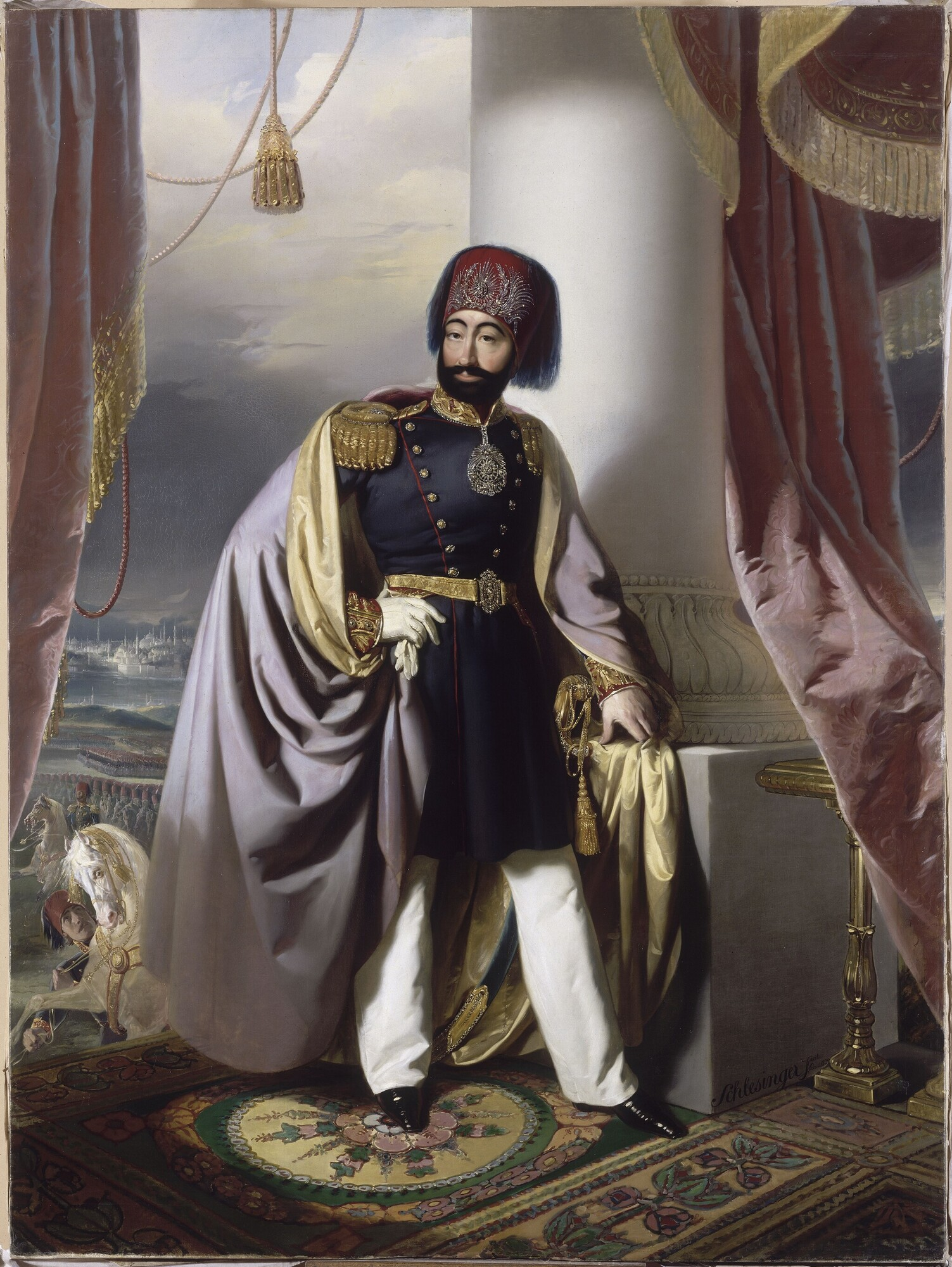
Mahmud II, the Sultan who abolished the Janissary corps and initiated the Tanzimat reforms. His introduction of fez foreshadows Mustafa Kemal's clothing reforms.

Anti-Western yet pro-Westernization, Kemalist historiography rarely uses Western primary, and secondary sources, as well as the sources that originate from non-Turkish languages of the Ottoman Empire. It describes the history of Ottoman Empire based on Turkish national identity, and often neglects the experiences of non-Muslims and minority groups of the late empire, especially on topics such as conscription, desertion, and forced labor; while also erasing the diversity of the early empire. The historiography therefore has a tendency to 'Turkify' the Ottomanist ideology that was present within the Muslim and non-Muslim subjects of the empire.

The reforms implemented in the late Empire that date back to Selim III and the Tanzimat period, is regarded as a "teleological history of modernization" that aims to facilitate "ideological mobilization", a view that thrived further in the early Kemalist Republic. Erasing the memory and culture of the Ottoman Empire was therefore seen as a necessity by the Kemalist regime, in order to successfully implement said "ideological mobilization", that is, to introduce modern Western political ideals into Turkey.

Because of this, Kemalist historiography studies the Ottoman history under two main periods: a rise under competent Sultans such as Mehmed II, in a so-called "Golden Age", and decline under corrupt Sultans in the late empire, which ultimately led to its dissolution. The first period is proudly embraced by Kemalist historiography, as it marked the territorial expansion of the Empire and was historically associated with Central Asia and Anatolia. According to Erdem Sönmez, this enabled the Kemalists to engage in "double-discourse", that "embrace[d] and reject[ed] the Ottoman past simultaneously".

=== World War I ===
The Kemalist narrative of the Great War (Cihan Harbi) puts an emphasis on the victories that took place on the Turkish mainland, thus excluding Balkan and Arab provinces. Therefore, it promotes the Battle of Gallipoli, led by Mustafa Kemal, and sidelines events such as the Siege of Kut, which took place in Mesopotamia. The historiography also downplays the importance of German officers and Esad Pasha in the former battle, thus elevating Kemal; this is achieved by an extensive interview published in a newspaper called Yeni Mecmua, publicising him as the "hero of Anafartalar". Even though Kemalist historiography is critical of the Unionists' decision to involve in the world war, the similarity of personnel and ideas between the CUP and the early Kemalist revolutionaries encouraged Kemalist Turkey to protect the legacy of CUP members; this was a tendency that lasted until the rise of the AKP in the early 2000s.

=== Turkish War of Independence ===
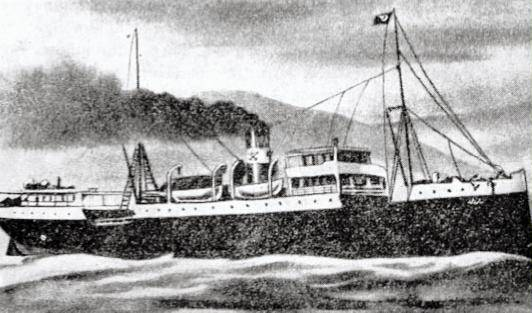
SS Bandırma, the vessel on which Mustafa Kemal departed from the Ottoman capital Istanbul, embarking on Samsun on 19 May 1919, recognized by Kemalist historiography as the beginning of Turkish War of Independence.

The official historiography of Turkish War of Independence is mostly based on the memoirs of Mustafa Kemal, overshadowing the internal conflict between and accomplishments of former CUP members during the war. According to this narrative, the War of Independence was waged against the Allied Powers of World War I. This is rejected by Armenian historian Vahagn Avedian on the grounds that Turkish National Movement mostly fought against neighboring Christian nations in Anatolia, namely Greece and Armenia.

During the War of Independence, Soviet leadership and Turkish socialists depicted the conflict as a struggle against imperialism. Mustafa Kemal used this interpretation in his rhetoric, in order to rally support for the national movement. According to Turkish writer Fikret Başkaya, this narrative enabled the atrocities against non-Muslims and Kurds to be overlooked.

After the establishment of the Republic, politicians Kazım Karabekir, Rauf Orbay, Rıza Nur disputed the official historiography of War of Independence by writing and publishing their own memoirs. In contemporary Turkey, Islamist, socialist, liberal, and Kurdish nationalist narratives challenge the official historiography of the war.

=== Armenian and Greek genocides ===
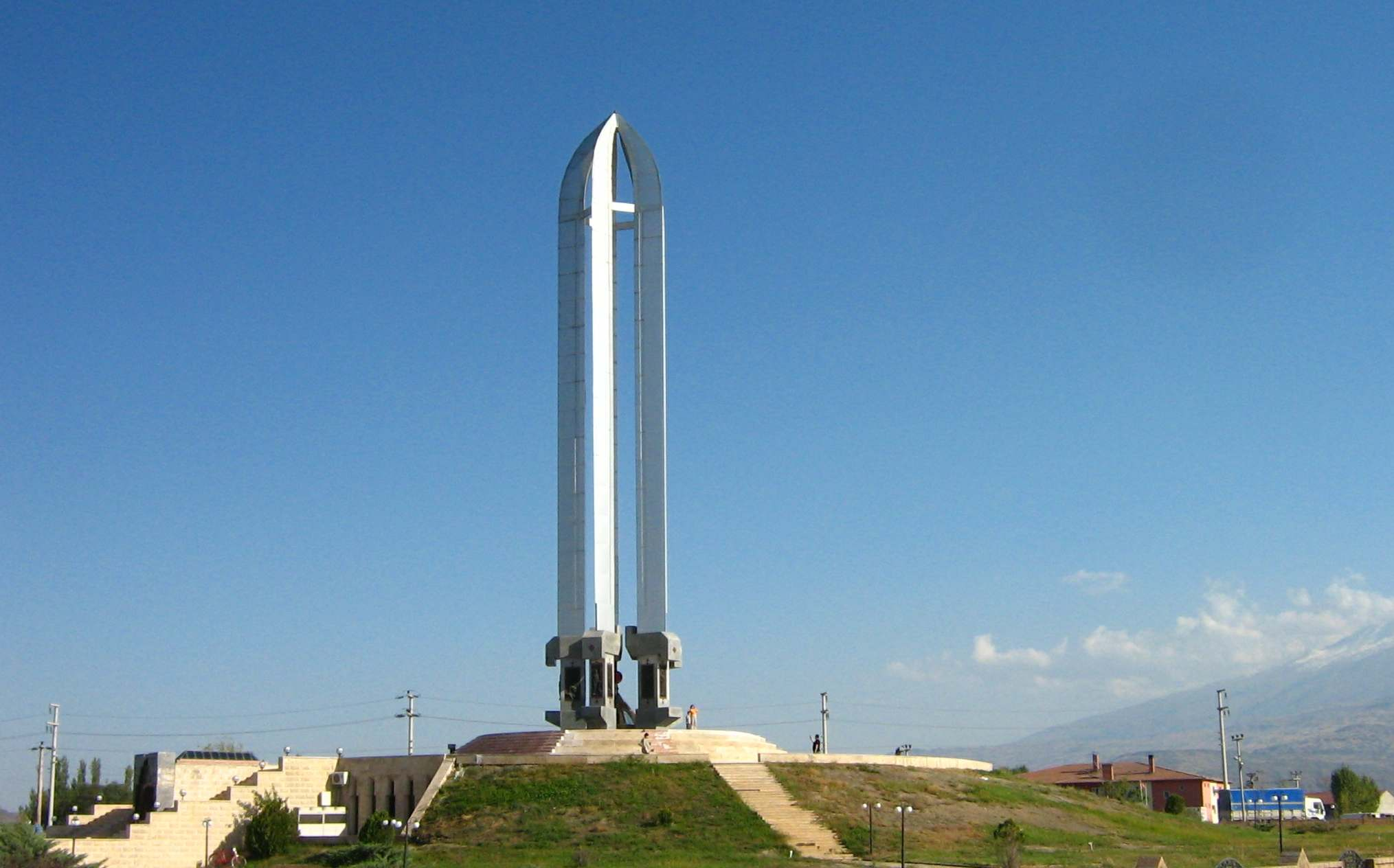
The Iğdır Genocide Memorial and Museum promotes the view that Armenians committed genocide against Turks, rather than vice versa.

Kemalist historiography omits the grievances of Greek and Armenian minorities (see Armenian and Greek genocides), and memorializes the suffering of the Turkish people. This narrative is not only embraced by admirers of the Kemalist past, however, as Conservatives and Islamists maintain the same approach to the events of 1915. To this day, the memory of the perpetrators of Armenian genocide is preserved in many place names, including schools, streets, and squares, both in Turkey and Northern Cyprus.

In the late 1990s and early 2000s, the works of Taner Akçam challenged orthodox scholarship, which had also been adopted by scholars outside Turkey, such as Stanford Shaw. Largely because of this shift, followers of Kemalist historiography after the turn of the 21st century minimize the suffering of Armenian people, instead of completely ignoring it. This, too, is regarded to be illegitimate by the wider academic consensus.

== Atatürk's speech (Nutuk) ==
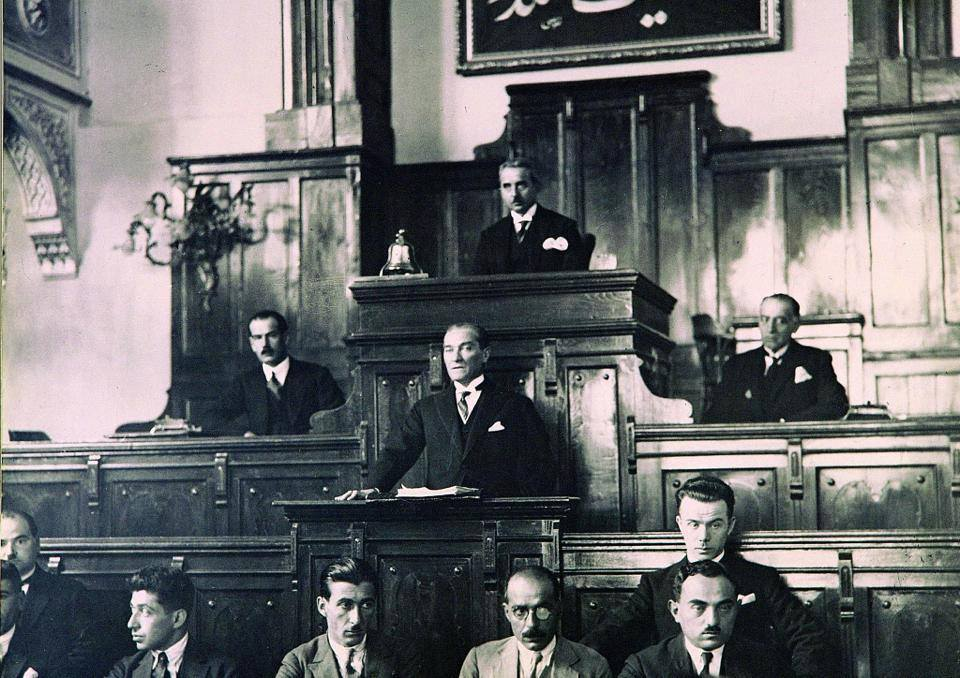
Mustafa Kemal delivering his speech in the Assembly.

Nutuk (The Speech) is a thirty-six hour speech delivered by Mustafa Kemal to the Turkish Grand National Assembly in 1927. Discussing the events between 1919 and 1923, it paved the ground for the foundation myths of Turkish Republic and the official historiography of the War of Independence. Tanıl Bora, however, notes that the importance of Nutuk as a keystone in Kemalist historiography only emerged after the 1980 Turkish coup d'état. He points out that no new editions of Nutuk were printed between 1938 and 1950, and that after 1950 it was not regarded as a "holy book" for "a long time". Even when the emphasis on it grew after 1980, Bora states that Nutuk was not read very widely but was rather used as "iconological material".

== Later interpretations ==
Towards the late 1970s, Turkey's attitude to its historiography underwent a process of rapid change, largely as a result of killings committed by the Armenian Secret Army for the Liberation of Armenia (ASALA) and the emergence of the Armenian genocide as a pressing foreign affairs issue. The state's reaction to this shift in global priorities was to create and memorialize its own historiography by way of state-sponsored publications and "public commemorations".

This attitude underwent a process of change for a second time after the 1980 Turkish coup d'état. The military, with the intention of social engineering, aimed to spread Kemalist values, which they preferred to refer to as Atatürkism (Atatürkçülük). During this period, the government purged a large number of left-wing scholars from higher education institutions, especially the ones who worked on disciplines such as economy, political sciences, and history, in order to reorganize academia. The military junta then assigned loyal figures to the emptied posts. The excluded academicians either started to work on private sector or moved abroad. The ones who remained, founded scientific publishing houses such as Belge and İletişim, and associations such as Tarih Vakfı (the Foundation for History), as the military regime liberalized overtime. This trend ultimately led to foundation of private universities starting with the mid-1990s.

There was a third change in attitude towards the late 1990s and early 2000s. During these fifteen years, the number of publications on World War I flourished. Possibly due to the factors such as political and economical liberalization, and the rise of the AKP, works with alternative narratives that challenged Kemalist ones emerged. These paradigms were later called Post-Kemalism. As a result of this, the military domination of research output and historical discourse was broken. However, as the AKP later allied with its former rivals, the historiography took another nationalistic turn. Post-Kemalism was also criticized by scholars today as over-focusing on the foundation years of the republic, while ignoring Ottoman-Turkish political culture and historical developments before and after of Kemalist regime.

In the early 2000s, Kemalist historiography was utilized and advanced by Turkish left-wing neo-nationalism (Ulusalcılık) "to develop conspiracy theories".

== Archives and journals ==
In Turkey, official military sources have dominated scientific publishing on military history since the 1920s. Askeri Mecmua (The Military Journal), which was first issued in 1882, was a prime example of this. The journal published sixty-two papers on World War I between March 1919 and March 1948. Starting with 1952, these papers were featured in Harp Tarihi Vesikaları (Documents on the History of War), which was later renamed to Harp Tarihi Belgeleri in 1973, and ultimately in Askerî Tarih Belgeleri (Documents of Military History) between 1978 and 2004.

In 1916, Ottoman Ministry of War created a department to gather and categorize the war documents. These documents, mostly consisting of war diaries, were stored in the Military Archives (Tarih-i Harp Şubesi). The recently created department operated under the General Staff. Today, after a series of name changes, this department is known as Askerî Tarih ve Stratejik Etüt Başkanlığı (ATASE, Directorate for Military History and Strategic Studies). Other archival documents are stored at Başbakanlık Osmanlı Arşivleri (BOA, Ottoman Archives of the Prime Ministry). As of 2021, many diaries of the officers of Turkish War of Independence, which are located at ATASE, have not been examined by scholars. The inaccessible archives at ATASE are also believed to contain documents that will help shed light on the causes of the Armenian genocide.

== See also ==
- History of the Republic of Turkey
- Mustafa Kemal Atatürk's cult of personality
- Kemalism
- Great man theory
- Post-Kemalism
