= Perinçek v. Switzerland =

European Court of Human Rights case

- Court: European Court of Human Rights
- Decided: 15 October 2015
- Citation: ECLI:CE:ECHR:2013:1217JUD002751008

Case history
- Prior action: Chamber judgment 2013

Perinçek v. Switzerland is a 2013 judgment of the European Court of Human Rights concerning public statements by Doğu Perinçek, a Turkish nationalist political activist and member of the Talat Pasha Committee, who was convicted by a Swiss court for publicly denying the Armenian genocide. He was sentenced to 90 days in prison and fined 3000 Swiss francs.

A preliminary hearing on the appeal by Switzerland was held on 28 January 2015. The Grand Chamber ruled in favour of Perinçek on 15 October 2015, who argued his right to freedom of expression.

The judgement was praised by some scholars for upholding freedom of speech, and criticized by others for overlooking anti-Armenianism and creating a double standard between Holocaust denial and the denial of other genocides.

== Background ==
Doğu Perinçek is a Turkish politician, activist, and member of the Talat Pasha Committee, an ultranationalist organization named after the main perpetrator of the Armenian genocide. In order to "test" the Swiss law on genocide denial, he repeatedly called the Armenian genocide of 1915 a "great international lie" during a trip to Lausanne to commemorate the 82nd anniversary of the 1923 Treaty of Lausanne, which largely established the borders of Turkey. He was found guilty of racial discrimination by a Swiss district court in Lausanne in March 2007. He was sentenced to 90 days imprisonment and fined 3000 Swiss francs. At the trial, Perinçek denied the charge thus: "I have not denied genocide because there was no genocide." After the court's decision, he said, "I defend my right to freedom of expression." Perinçek appealed the verdict. In December 2007, the Swiss Federal Supreme Court confirmed the sentence given to Perinçek. Perinçek then appealed to the European Court of Human Rights.

== Lower court judgment ==
In December 2013 the Lower Court of the European Court of Human Rights ruled by 5-2 that Switzerland had violated Doğu Perinçek's freedom of expression guaranteed by Article 10 of the European Convention on Human Rights. It ruled that Perinçek had not abused his rights within the meaning of Article 17 of the Convention, which prohibits individuals using the rights of the Convention to seek the abolition or restriction of other individuals' rights guaranteed by the Convention.

The court ruling stated the following:

The Court considers that the rejection of the legal characterisation of the events of 1915 was not in itself sufficient to amount to incitement of hatred towards the Armenian people. [...] The applicant has not abused his right to engage in open discussion of matters including those which are sensitive and likely to cause offence. The free exercise of this right is one of the fundamental aspects of freedom of expression and distinguishes a democratic, tolerant and pluralist society from a totalitarian or dictatorial regime.

The Court pointed out that "it was not called upon to rule on the legal characterisation of the Armenian genocide. The existence of a "genocide", which was a precisely defined legal concept, was not easy to prove. The Court doubted that there could be a general consensus as to events such as those at issue, given that historical research was by definition open to discussion and a matter of debate, without necessarily giving rise to final conclusions or to the assertion of objective and absolute truths."

== Appeal and final judgement by the Grand Chamber ==
The government of Switzerland announced its decision to appeal the lower court's ruling. On 3 June 2014 the court accepted the appeal to move to the Grand Chamber to clarify the scope available to Swiss authorities in applying the Swiss Criminal Code.

The first hearing took take place on 28 January 2015 with Perinçek represented by Professor Laurent Pech, head of Department of Law at Middlesex University in London, and Turkey represented as a third party by Stefan Talmon, a professor of law at Oxford University. Switzerland was represented by lawyer Frank Schürmann while Armenia was represented as a third party by Doughty Street Chambers led by Geoffrey Robertson QC and Amal Clooney. The Court's subsequent deliberations were held in private. A video of the first hearing of the appeal can be found on the website of the European Court for Human Rights.

While being fully aware of the acute sensitivities attached by the Armenian community to the issue in relation to which the applicant spoke, the Court, taking into account the nature and context of his statements, ruled that they "did not amount to incitement to violence or hatred" against Armenians. The Grand Chamber judgment states multiple times that the applicant did not express contempt or hatred for the victims of the events of 1915 and the following years. The judgement further noted that, among other things, Perinçek's statements were aimed not at the Armenian community but "the ‘imperialists’ whom he regarded as responsible for the atrocities." The Grand Chamber held, by ten votes to seven, that there had been a violation of Article 10 of the Convention and ruled in favour of Perinçek on 15 October 2015.

In a statement issued by Armenia's counsel, Geoffrey Robertson and Amal Clooney said they were pleased the Court had endorsed their argument on behalf of Armenia. The judgment did not dispute the fact of the Armenian genocide and recognised Armenians' right under European law to have their dignity respected and protected, including the recognition of a communal identity forged through suffering following the annihilation of more than half their race by the Ottoman Turks.

The Grand Chamber also made clear that the court was not required to determine whether the massacres and mass deportations suffered by the Armenian people at the hands of the Ottoman Empire from 1915 onwards can be characterised as genocide within the meaning of that term under international law. It also added that it has no authority to make legally binding pronouncements, one way or the other, on this point. Furthermore, 7 judges, including then-President of the European Court of Human Rights Dean Spielmann notably stated in a joint dissenting opinion that it was self-evident that the massacres and deportations suffered by the Armenian people constituted genocide and that the Armenian genocide was a clearly established historical fact. "But that is not the question here. The case is not about the historical truth, or the legal characterisation of the events of 1915", they wrote. In the rest of their joint dissenting opinion, they detailed why they were unable to follow the majority's approach as regards the assessment of the applicant's statements.

== Reception ==
=== Praise ===
Professor Dirk Voorhoof of Ghent University praised the judgment, arguing that it "would certainly be a sad day for freedom of expression in Europe" if the judgment was successfully appealed to the Grand Chamber. In an official statement, the Turkish Ministry of Foreign Affairs announced that the outcome of the case was "a very strong signal against all efforts imposing the “genocide” allegation as the only and absolute truth along with attempts and practices which even forbid questioning it " The Global Freedom of Expression initiative at Columbia University characterized the ruling as expanding freedom of expression.

=== Criticism ===
The court's reasoning in this case was widely criticized. Since the ECHR has ruled that member states may criminalize Holocaust denial, the verdict has been criticized for creating a double standard between the Holocaust and other genocides, along with failure to acknowledge anti-Armenianism as a motivation for genocide denial.

Shant N. Nashalian stated that the court ignored that Perinçek "seemingly intended to further spread the Turkish program of denial and suppression throughout the world, thus perpetuating the Young Turks' and Atatürk's destructive and repressive ideology still present in Turkey today". According to law professor Sévane Garibian, the verdict "marks a victory for the ideology of genocide denial". Perinçek and the Talat Pasha Committee misrepresented the verdict to claim that the court put an end to the "hundred year-old genocide lie".

The Armenian writer Harut Sassounian described the Court's 2013 judgment an endorsement of the denialist stance of both Turkey and Perinçek. The Turkish Human Rights Association also expressed its opposition to the court's reasoning:

As human rights defenders in Turkey, we are the most immediate, most direct witnesses of how the denial of the genocide against Armenians and other Christian ethnic groups of Asia Minor has right from the start generate[d an] anti-democratic system, allowing racist hatred, hate crimes and violation of the freedom of expression and the human rights in general.

== See also ==
- Genocide denial
- Anti-Turkish sentiment
