= Workers' Party (Turkey) =

Left-wing political party in Turkey

Workers' Party İşçi Partisi
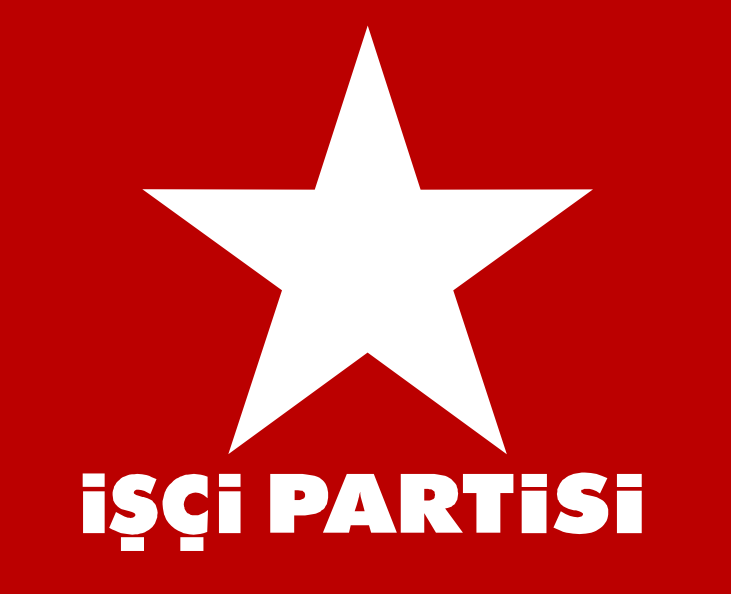
- Leader: Doğu Perinçek
- Founded: 10 July 1992
- Dissolved: 15 February 2015
- Preceded by: Socialist Party
- Succeeded by: Patriotic Party
- Headquarters: Toros Sokak No: 9 Sıhhiye, Ankara
- Ideology: Kemalism; Scientific socialism Left-wing nationalism Left-wing populism Ulusalcılık; Maoism
- Political position: Far-left
- International affiliation: CILRECO (International Liaison Committee for Reunification and Peace in Korea), Los Partidos Y Una Nueva Sociedad.
- Colours: Red; White; Wine Red (customary)
- Slogan: Bağımsızlık, devrim, sosyalizm! ("Independence, revolution, socialism!")

The Workers' Party (Turkish: İşçi Partisi, İP) was a Turkish political party founded in 1992 and led by Doğu Perinçek. It had its roots in the Revolutionary Workers' and Peasants' Party of Turkey (TİİKP), the Workers' and Peasants' Party of Turkey (TİKP), and the Socialist Party (SP), which was banned by the Constitutional Court in 1992. They were known as "Aydınlıkçılar" (Clarifiers) due to their daily newspaper Aydınlık ("Clarify" or "Enlightenment") which had a circulation of 63,000 in 2012.

During a general assembly on 15 February 2015, the Workers' Party rebranded and changed its name to Patriotic Party. Perinçek remained as leader.

== Overview ==
The İP traditionally combined Maoist rhetoric with hard-line, left-wing Kemalism called ulusalcılık. The party accepted scientific socialism as their main ideology, combined with more of a patriotic core than other left-wing parties in Turkey. Their revolutionary ideals were based on the "National Democratic Revolution", close in name to Mao Zedong's "New Democratic Revolution". İP supported Stalin's "Socialism in One Country" thesis, rather than Mirsaid Sultan-Galiev's "national communism" thesis.

Mehmet Bedri Gültekin, deputy chairman of the party, wrote a book on Sultan-Galiev's counter-revolutionary role. They admired the founder of the Turkish republic, Mustafa Kemal Atatürk (considered a "left-wing bourgeois democratic revolutionary" by Chairman Perinçek), as much as they admired Marxist revolutionary leaders like Vladimir Lenin, Joseph Stalin and Mao Zedong. The party promoted alliances with nations that the party believes have anti-imperialist tendencies (such as Venezuela, Brazil and Cuba) and opposed the existence of American expansionism (such as India, China and Russia).

İP stated that a brotherhood-based solution to the Kurdish question must exclude imperialist initiative in the Middle East. They claimed that the Kurdistan Workers' Party (PKK) has been completely under the control of the USA since the Gulf War. İP asserted that it is still possible to unite Turkish and Kurdish people in Turkey within the borders of an anti-imperialist nation state which will be established through a democratic revolution. According to the party, separatism became a tool of American imperialism in breaking national markets in the Third World in post-Cold War conditions. Although they traversed separation, they also defended democratic rights and freedoms of Kurdish peoples in Turkey. For İP, the key tool to solve the Kurdish problem is to demolish "feudal structures" in Kurdish provinces and make peasants "free citizens".

== Wings ==
- The youth student wing of İP was known as Öncü Gençlik (Vanguard Youth).
- The women wing of İP was known as Öncü Kadın (Vanguard Women).

== Media ==
- Aydınlık (Clarity), daily newspaper.
- Aydınlık Daily, news portal in English.
- Teori (Theory), monthly theory and strategy review.
- Bilim ve Ütopya (Science and Utopia), monthly science journal.
- Ulusal Kanal (National Channel), television station.
- Kaynak Yayınları (Source Publications), publisher.

== Election results ==
=== Parliamentary elections ===
Grand National Assembly of Turkey
Election date	Leader	Votes	%	Seats
1995	Doğu Perinçek	61,428	0.22%	0 / 550
1999	Doğu Perinçek	57,593	0.18%	0 / 550
2002	Doğu Perinçek	160,227	0.51%	0 / 550
2007	Doğu Perinçek	127,220	0.36%	0 / 550
