= Sadık Perinçek =

Turkish politician (1915–2000)

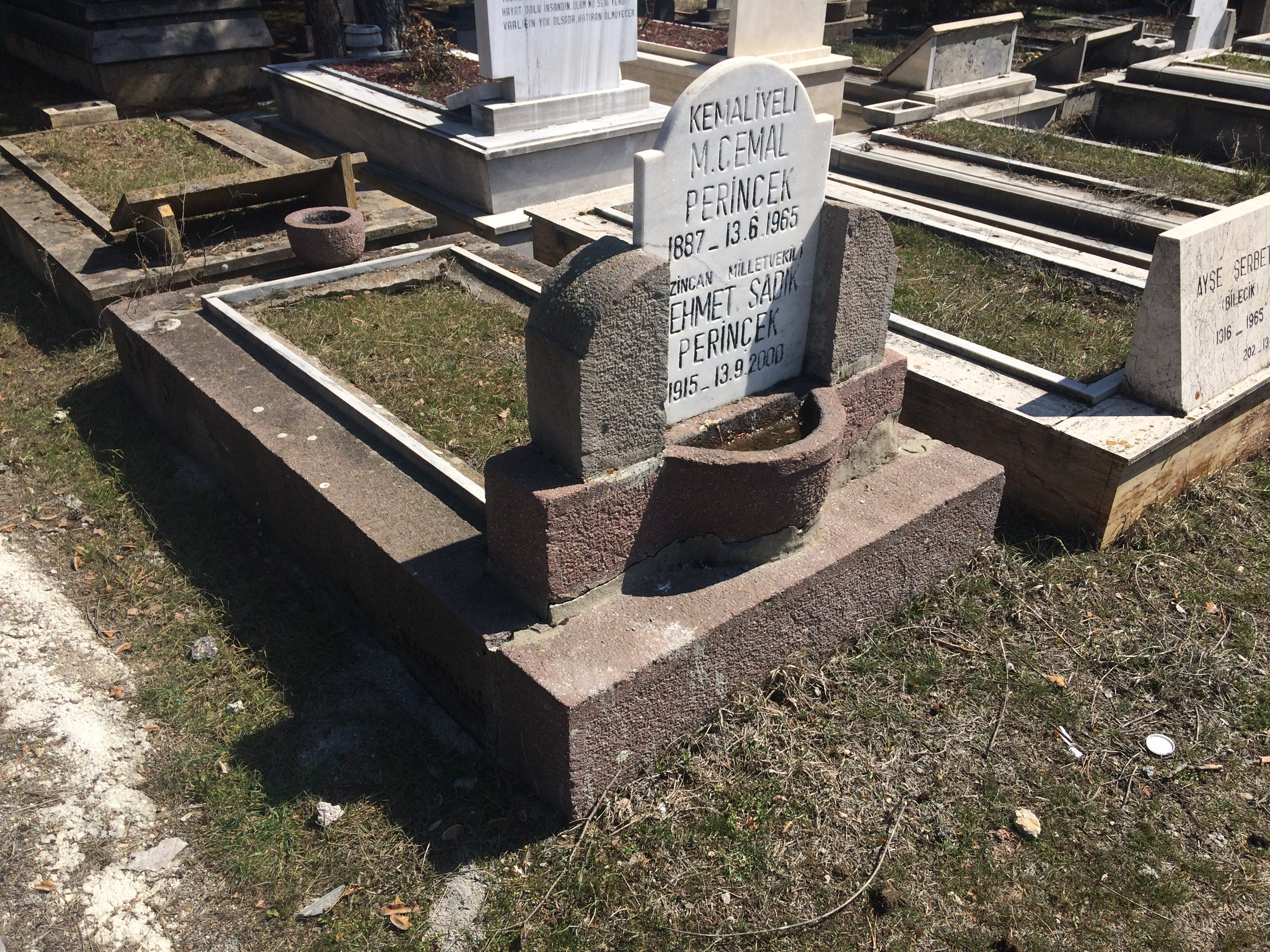
Grave of Sadık Perinçek at Cebeci Asri Cemetery.

Sadık Perinçek (1915 in Kemaliye – 13 September 2000) was the deputy Chief Prosecutor of the Supreme Court of Turkey and a parliamentary deputy in the 1950s and 1960s. He was the father of politician Doğu Perinçek.

== Career ==
Perinçek was elected in the 1954 general election for the Democratic Party, representing Erzincan Province until the 1957 elections, in which he was not elected. In the 1961 general election he was elected again for the New Turkey Party. In the 1965 general election and 1969 general election he was elected for the Justice Party.
