= Ulusalism =

Ideology in Turkey

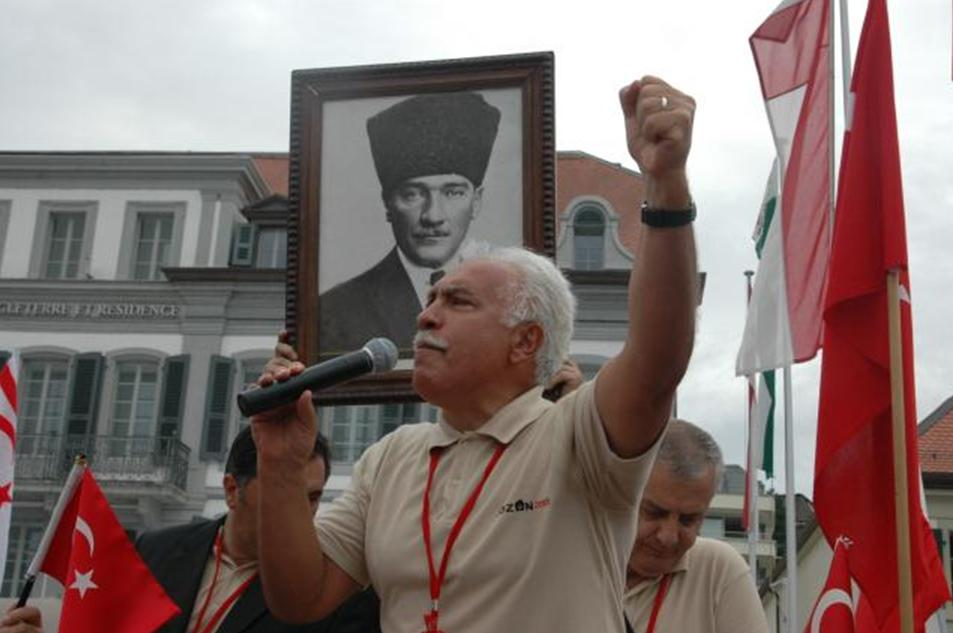
Doğu Perinçek, one of the main proponents of Ulusalcı discourse, and the chairman of Patriotic Party.

Ulusalism (Turkish: Ulusalcılık) (Note: Ulusalcılık, noun; Ulusalcı, adjective. Both originate from ulusal "national" or ulus "nation" or and "quota".) is a Turkish nationalist, secularist (laik) ideology in Turkey that is influenced by Kemalism. Until the late 20th century, the word had been used as an equivalent of nationalism. In the mid-1990s, it transformed into an ideology led by left-wing nationalists, such as Attila İlhan, Mümtaz Soysal, and Doğu Perinçek.

As a reaction to the rise of a reformist, but staunchly conservative AKP in 2000s, Ulusalists came up with numerous conspiracy theories. The central theme of these theories is a world-wide conspiracy to destroy Turkey, which is believed to be spearheaded by countries such as United States, EU member states, Greece, Israel, and Armenia, ethnicities such as Greeks, Arabs, and Armenians, and ideologies such as liberalism, anti-nationalist leftism, and Islamism. To further consolidate their claims, the leaders of the ideology sought to 'historically prove' their theories, thus developing Kemalist historiography and radicalizing it. These theories were popularized by media outlets such as Sözcü, a staunch Kemalist newspaper. According to Doğan Gürpınar, the theories are mostly popular among upper-middle-class secular Turks; however, he notes that there is a lack of definitive research on this area.

== Position on the political spectrum ==
The majority of those who identify themselves as Ulusalists define themselves as politically on the left. In a different view, CHP İzmir MP and former ECtHR judge Rıza Türmen considered Ulusalism as a kind of "extreme Kemalist nationalism" and said that one cannot be both a Ulusalist and a leftist. At the same time, many Ulusalists tend to take socially conservative or restrictive views on issues such as minority rights and gender politics, which often lead to friction with the wider liberal left.

In the Grand National Assembly of Turkey, the word "Ulusalist" has also been used only in a nationalist sense. For example, in a debate in the parliament, Muharrem İnce gave the example of Islamist politician Necmettin Erbakan and said, "Our world views were not the same with the late Erbakan, but he had a Ulusalist side, [and] he had a national stance." For Kemal Kılıçdaroğlu, on the other hand, the word Ulusalism meant nationalism and patriotism and said in 2013 that CHP members were Ulusalist.

AK Party Deputy Chairman Hüseyin Çelik said of the students who protested against Erdoğan at METU in 2012, "They are incorrigible Ulusalists."

== Ulusalist political parties ==
- National Party
- Patriotic Party
- Factions of the Republican People's Party

== See also ==
- Left-conservatism
- Nationalitarianism, a French version of Ulusalism
- Önder Sav
- Secularism in Turkey
- Turkish nationalism
