= Vanguard Youth (Turkey) =

Vanguard Youth, (Turkish: Öncü Gençlik), Vatan Youth, or Patriotic Youth is the youth organization of the Patriotic Party in Turkey. It was launched on 17 April 1994, during the Workers' Party period. Vanguard Youth is a legal left-wing nationalist organization.

== Purpose and methods ==
Vatan Youth considers that its primary duty is to unite the youth around the great values of the country, labor and humanity by leading the youth movement in Turkey ideologically, strategically, politically and practically. Vatan Youth cadres and members, in addition to participating in party work, mainly carry out activities within university societies and youth mass organizations.

Its slogan is "Full independent and truly democratic Turkey!". It aims to spread its political program among the largest youth masses, in universities and high schools.

The organization argues that a people's power that favors independence, enlightenment and labor can be established through democratic revolutions through the process of permanent revolution. It highlights Turkey's 200-year-old struggle for democratic revolution (Midhat Pasha, Namık Kemal, Mustafa Kemal Atatürk, Şefik Hüsnü, 27 May cadres, 1968 Movement) and the revolutionary accumulation of humanity (French Revolution, Russian Revolutions and anti-imperialist revolutions in oppressed nations). In this context, it directs its members to organize so that the youth masses can fight united. Vatan Youth defends the right of everyone to engage in free politics on campuses. It supports the right to education.
