= Mehmet Perinçek =

Turkish academic (born 1978)

- Born: 19 September 1978 (age 47); Istanbul, Turkey
- Education: Istanbul University; Moscow State Institute of International Relations
- Parent(s): Doğu Perinçek; Şule Perinçek
- Website: www.mehmetperincek.com

Mehmet Bora Perinçek (born 19 September 1978) is a Turkish historian, political scientist, and professor.

== Biography ==
Perinçek was born on 19 September 1978, in Istanbul, to Şule and Doğu Perinçek. He is fluent in English, German, and Russian.

== Career ==
=== Scholar ===
Perinçek is most widely known for his work relating to the Turkish history, particularly around the 1900s to the 1950s. He work in relation to Ottoman and Turkish history relative to Russia is notable. He claims that "tens of thousands" of previously unknown Soviet documents related to the Armenian genocide have been declassified since the 1990s, citing examples from the State Archive of the Russian Federation such as telegrams from Polikarp Mdivani and A. Ioannisyan to Joseph Stalin, a report from the People's Commissariat for Foreign Affairs to the Politburo, internal memos from Stalin to Vladimir Lenin and Georgy Chicherin, as well as other documents.

Elövset Ağalarov, a former independent Azeri MP, current director of Azernashr, and personal friend of Perinçek, described him as a "very valuable researcher" to the Turkish people.

=== Writing ===
Perinçek published Армянский вопрос в 120 документах из российских государственных архивов (120 Documents in the Russian State Archives on the Armenian Question), a book about his research, in 2011. He is also known to write on the subject of politics.

== Detention, arrest, and incarceration ==
Perinçek was detained for suspected links to the shadow organisation Ergenekon on 19 August 2011 and formally arrested during the early hours of 22 August 2011 by a ruling made by Istanbul's 12th High Criminal Court. He was incarcerated at Silivri Prison; and on 5 August 2013 he was sentenced to six years in prison.
