= Ulusal Kanal =

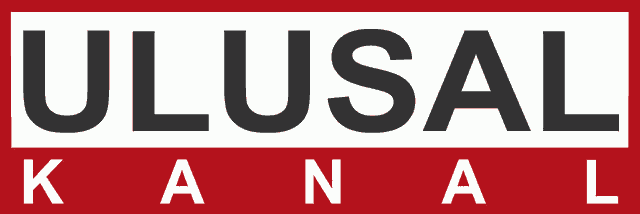
- Country: Turkey
- Broadcast area: Turkey (satellite, cable, terrestrial, web), Middle East and Eastern Europe (satellite, web)
- Headquarters: Beyoğlu, Turkey

Programming
- Language: Turkish
- Picture format: 16:9

Ownership
- Owner: Yalçın Büyükdağlı

History
- Launched: 2000

Links
- Website: www.ulusal.com.tr

Ulusal Kanal (English: the National Channel) is a private Turkish nationwide TV channel established in 2000 broadcasting news and politics. It is linked with the Patriotic Party and was raided by police in 2011 as part of the Ergenekon investigation. Broadcast is done in 576i@50 fields/s SD despite having 1080i HD broadcast equipment. Ulusal Kanal is partly financed by ads and partly by merchandise.

== See also ==
- Patriotic Party
