= Aydınlık =

Turkish newspaper

- Type: Daily newspaper
- Founded: 1921
- Political alignment: Patriotic Party
- Language: Turkish
- Headquarters: Istanbul, Turkey
- Circulation: 61,000 (2013)
- Website: https://egazete.aydinlik.com.tr

Aydınlık ("Clarify" or "Enlightenment" in Turkish) is the newspaper of the Patriotic Party (Vatan Partisi). Originally launched as a weekly newspaper in 1921, it has been repeatedly closed and relaunched, most recently in 2011.

== History ==
=== Early history ===
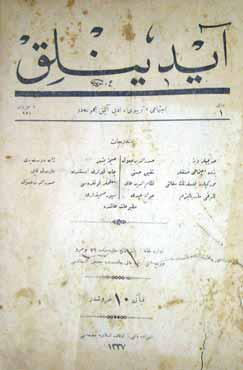
Aydınlık, 1 June 1921

Aydınlık was launched in 1921 as the Ottoman Empire's first socialist newspaper (a weekly); it was associated with the Communist Party of Turkey. It was closed down in 1925. In the interim it published authors such as Nâzım Hikmet, Şevket Süreyya Aydemir, Hasan Âli and Kerim Sadi.

In November 1968 it was relaunched as a monthly magazine, by Doğu Perinçek and Vahap Erdoğdu of the Workers Party of Turkey, with contributors including İbrahim Kaypakkaya. It was closed in 1971 after the 1971 Turkish coup d'état. It was relaunched in November 1974 as a weekly, but was shut down under martial law in February 1975. It resumed publication in October when martial law was lifted, as a monthly magazine.

On 1 March 1978 Aydınlık was relaunched as a daily newspaper, but was closed down immediately after the September 1980 Turkish coup d'état.

=== Recent history ===
After a 13-year absence the daily Aydınlık resumed publication on 1 May 1993. However, in 1994 the decision was made to again switch to a weekly format.

In 2009 Aydınlık was banned for 1 month for allegedly "spreading propaganda for a terrorist organization." Earlier in the year Aydınlık had published details of wiretapped conversations between Prime Minister Recep Tayyip Erdoğan and North Cyprus's Mehmet Ali Talat. Prosecutors in the Ergenekon trials later alleged that the recording came from retired General Levent Ersöz.

On 1 March 2011, Aydınlık became a daily again. Since 16 April 2012 the newspaper's European edition is published five days a week in 8 European countries.

In December 2011, Aydınlık's owner, Mehmet Sabuncu, was arrested as part of the Ergenekon investigation. In November 2014, Sabuncu was again appointed as the editor-in-chief of the newspaper.
