= Doğu Perinçek =

Turkish politician (born 1942)

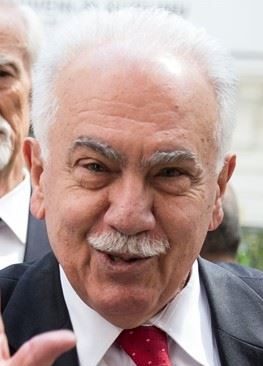
- Perinçek in May 2018

Chairman of the Patriotic Party
- Incumbent
- Assumed office 15 February 2015
- Preceded by: Himself (as Chairman of the Workers' Party)

Chairman of the Workers' Party
- In office 10 July 1992 – 15 February 2015
- Preceded by: Party established

Chairman of the Socialist Party
- In office July 1991 – 10 July 1992
- Preceded by: Ferit İlsever

Chairman of the Workers' and Peasants' Party of Turkey
- In office 29 January 1978 – 12 September 1980

Personal details
- Born: 17 June 1942 (age 84) Gaziantep, Turkey
- Party: Patriotic Party (2015–present)
- Other political affiliations: Workers' and Peasants' Party of Turkey (1978–1980); Socialist Party (1991–1992); Workers' Party (1992–2015)
- Children: 4, including Mehmet
- Parent: Sadık Perinçek (father)
- Education: Lawyer

Doğu Perinçek (Turkish pronunciation: [do'u pe'ɾintʃec]; born 17 June 1942) is a Turkish politician, doctor of law and former communist revolutionary who has been chairman of the left-wing nationalist Patriotic Party since 2015. He was also a member of the Talat Pasha Committee, an organization that denies the Armenian genocide. Politically, he is a Eurasianist who favors closer relations with China and Russia, and is one of the most anti-American politicians in Turkey.

== Background and personal life ==
Doğu Perinçek was born in Gaziantep in 1942 to Sadık Perinçek of Apçağa, Kemaliye, and Lebibe Olcaytu of Balaban, Darende. Sadık Perinçek was the Deputy Chief Prosecutor of the Supreme Court and a parliamentary deputy of the Justice Party (AP), the predecessor of the True Path Party (DYP). Perinçek attended Ankara Sarar primary school, Atatürk Lycee, and Bahçelievler Deneme high school. He interrupted his university education to study German at the Goethe Institute in Germany, going on to finish Ankara University's Law faculty, and working as an assistant lecturer in public law. He then completed a doctorate at the Otto-Suhr-Institut in Germany.

Prior to his detention as part of the Ergenekon case, Perinçek resided in Gayrettepe, Istanbul with his wife Şule Perinçek. They have two daughters, Zeynep and Kiraz, and two sons, Can and Mehmet Bora, who is a historian.

== Political career ==
Perinçek became involved in left-wing revolutionary politics in the 1960s. In 1968 he was elected president of the Federation of Debate Clubs (Fikir Kulüpleri Federasyonu, later Dev-Genç), a group of left-wing youth, and adopted a pro-Chinese, pro-Mao Zedong stance. Perinçek was involved in the relaunch of the magazine Aydınlık in 1968, supporting the Luminosity movement. Due to political disagreements between Mahir Çayan's followers and Perinçek's faction, Aydınlık split into two journals (Perinçek's group published under the name Proleter Devrimci Aydınlık). In 1969 he founded the illegal Revolutionary Workers' and Peasants' Party of Turkey (TİİKP). He was arrested after the 1971 military coup and sentenced to 20 years in prison, but was released in July 1974. In 1978 the Workers' and Peasants' Party of Turkey (TİKP) was founded as a legal successor to the TİİKP.

Perinçek was arrested again after the 1980 military coup and sentenced to eight years in prison. He was released in March 1985. In 1987 he was involved with the launch of the weekly news magazine 2000'e Doğru. In 1991, while he was editor-in-chief of 2000'e Doğru, he went to Lebanon to meet with Abdullah Öcalan, the leader of the Kurdistan Workers' Party (PKK).

In 1990, Perinçek was arrested and put in Diyarbakır Prison for three months after the issue of the Law of Censorship and Exile. In the 1990s he was involved with the founding of the short-lived Socialist Party and then the Workers' Party. He was the Workers' Party's leader from its foundation in 1992 until it was rebranded in 2015 as the Patriotic Party, which he has led since.

In Turkey, on 21 March 2008, Perinçek was detained as part of an investigation into the alleged organization named Ergenekon. This followed the arrest and detention of 39 suspects in January 2008 during raids targeting Ergenekon. On 5 August 2013 Perinçek was sentenced to aggravated life imprisonment. He was released on 10 March 2014 together with many other prisoners. Perinçek has spent a total of 15 years of his life in prison at different times.

Since 2014, he has been an influential informal foreign policy adviser to the Turkish government. His influence on foreign policy has been significant. Perinçek has stated that "[r]epublicans, nationalists, populists, socialists and revolutionaries all unite in one party, the Patriotic Party".

He was the presidential candidate of the Patriotic Party for the 2018 presidential elections, He attempted to be the party's presidential candidate for the 2023 elections, though didn't get enough signatures.

== Political positions ==
Perinçek has said that he supports scientific socialism. Despite being associated with Maoism for a long time, the Patriotic Party has said that he isn't a Maoist, instead saying that he embraced "Mao's contributions to the literature of the world revolution and scientific socialism" and "adapted them to Turkey's conditions". In 2013, he wrote that "we can learn the capitalism of the 19th century from Marx, capitalism and imperialism of the 20th century from Lenin, and the theories of the first experiences of the establishment of socialism from Mao".

=== Foreign policy ===
His foreign policy position seen as largely is anti-West and pro-China. During an interview with Xinhua News Agency in 2017, he praised the leadership of the Chinese Communist Party (CCP) and stated that "China today represents hope for the whole humanity".

He has strongly opposed the Turkish intervention in Syria and actively promoted better ties with president Bashar al-Assad and his government, personally meeting Assad in Damascus in 2015. He has called for better ties with Iran, and opposes US sanctions on the country.

Perinçek openly supported Vladimir Putin and the 2022 Russian invasion of Ukraine, saying that "it is the weapon that Russia is currently using that brings peace and tranquility".

== Armenian genocide denial case ==
In 2007, a ruling by a Swiss court made him the first person to receive a criminal conviction for denial of the Armenian genocide. He is a known denier of the Armenian genocide according to the Swiss-Armenian Association. The case was ultimately appealed to the Grand Chamber of the European Court of Human Rights, which in a 15 October 2015 judgment did not rule on the veracity of the Armenian genocide but ruled in favour of Perinçek on grounds of free speech.

Perinçek is notable as being the first person to be convicted by a court of law for denial of the Armenian genocide. On 9 March 2007, he was found guilty by a Swiss district court of conscious violation of Swiss laws against genocide denial with a racist motivation and was fined CHF 12,000. The case was a result of Perinçek's description of the Armenian genocide as "an international lie" at a demonstration in Lausanne on 25 July 2005; he later clarified to a Swiss court that there had been massacres, but reiterated his belief that these did not constitute genocide. The verdict was confirmed by the Vaud cantonal appeal court on 19 June, and by the Federal Supreme Court of Switzerland on 12 December 2007. Perinçek announced he will take recourse to the European Court of Human Rights. In December 2013 the European Court of Human Rights ruled that Switzerland violated the principle of freedom of expression. The court said that "Mr Perincek was making a speech of a historical, legal and political nature in a contradictory debate". After the ruling the government of Switzerland announced its decision to appeal the court's ruling. On 3 June 2014 the European Court of Human Rights accepted the appeal to move on to the Grand Chamber to clarify the scope available to Swiss authorities in applying the Swiss Criminal Code to combat racism. A preliminary hearing on the appeal by Switzerland was held on 28 January 2015.

The Grand Chamber ruled in favour of Perinçek on 15 October 2015. In a statement issued by Armenia's counsel, Geoffrey Robertson and Amal Clooney said they were pleased the Court had endorsed their argument on behalf of Armenia. The judgment did not dispute the fact of the Armenian genocide and recognised Armenians' right under European law to have their dignity respected and protected, including the recognition of a communal identity forged through suffering following the annihilation of more than half their race by the Ottoman Turks.

The Grand Chamber also made clear that the court was not required to determine whether the massacres and mass deportations suffered by the Armenian people at the hands of the Ottoman Empire from 1915 onwards can be characterised as genocide within the meaning of that term under international law. It also added that it has no authority to make legally binding pronouncements, one way or the other, on this point. Furthermore, 7 judges, including then-President of the European Court of Human Rights Dean Spielmann stated in their dissenting opinion that it is self-evident that the massacres and deportations suffered by the Armenian people constituted genocide and that the Armenian genocide is a clearly established historical fact.

== Selected books ==
- Türkiye'de Siyasi Partilerin İç Düzeni ve Yasaklanması Rejimi (A.Ü.H.F Publisher, 1968)
- Türkiye İhtilalci İşçi Köylü Partisi Davası SAVUNMA (September 1974)
- Kıvılcımlı'nın Burjuva Devlet ve Ordu Teorisinin Eleştirisi (Aydınlık Publisher, 1975)
- Faşizm Halkın Mücadelesini Durduramaz- Sıkıyönetim Mahkemelerindeki Konuşma ve Dilekçeler (Aydınlık Publisher, 1975) Kıbrıs Meselesi (Aydınlık Publisher, 1976)
- Anayasa ve Partiler Rejimi Türkiye'de Siyasal Partilerin İç Düzeni ve Yasaklanması (Kaynak Publisher)
- Bozkurt Efsaneleri ve Gerçek (Aydınlık Publisher and Kaynak Publisher, 1976, 1997)
- Sosyal-Emperyalizm ve Revizyonizme Karşı 1970'te Açılan Mücadele (Aydınlık Publisher, July 1976)
- Sahte TKP'nin Revizyonist Programının Eleştirisi (Aydınlık Publisher, 1976)
- Doğru Eylem Nedir? (Aydınlık Publisher, 1978)
- Anarşinin Kaynağı ve Devrimci Siyaset (Aydınlık Publisher, 1979)
- Türkiye Devriminin Yolu (Aydınlık Publisher, 1979)
- Atatürk'ün Bugünkü Önemi (October 1980)
- Kemalist Devrim-1 Teorik Çerçeve (Aydınlık Publisher and Publisher, 1977, 1994)
- Kemalist Devrim-2 Din ve Allah (Kaynak Publisher, 1994–1998)
- Kemalist Devrim-3 Altı Ok (Kaynak Publisher, 1999)
- Kemalist Devrim-4 Kurtuluş Savaşı'nda Kürt Politikası (Kaynak Publisher, November 1999)
- Kemalist Devrim-5 Kemalizmin Felsefesi ve Kaynakları (Kaynak Publisher)
- Kemalist Devrim-6 Atatürk'ün CHP Program ve Tüzükleri (Kaynak Publisher, June 2008)
- Kemalist Devrim-7 Toprak Ağalığı ve Kürt Sorunu (Kaynak Publisher, March 2010)
- Anayasa ve Partiler Rejimi (Kaynak Publisher, May 1985)
- Osmanlı'dan Bugüne Toplum ve Devlet (Kaynak Publisher, 1987)
- Stalin'den Gorbaçov'a (Kaynak Publisher, January 1990)
- Lenin, Stalin, Mao'nun Türkiye Yazıları (Kaynak Publisher, 1977)
- Abdullah Öcalan ile Görüşme (Kaynak Publisher, 1990)
- Parti ve Sanat (Kaynak Publisher, 1992)
- Türk Sorunu (Kaynak Publisher, 1993)
- Aydın ve Kültür (Kaynak Publisher, 1996)
- Çiller Özel Örgütü (Kaynak Publisher, 1996)
- Avrasya Seçeneği: Türkiye İçin Bağımsız Dış Politika (Kaynak Publisher, 1996)
- ÖDP'nin Kimliği (Kaynak Publisher, 1998)
- Bir Devlet Operasyonu (Kaynak Publisher, 1999)
- 28 Şubat ve Ordu (Kaynak Publisher, 2000)
- Eşcinsellik ve Yabancılaşma (Kaynak Publisher, 2000)
- Karen Fogg'un E-Postalları (Kaynak Publisher, 2002)
- Mafyokrasi (Kaynak Publisher, 2004)
- Memidik Kaptan'a Masallar (Kaynak Publisher, May 1998)
- Gladyo ve Ergenekon (Kaynak Publisher, 2008)
- Türk Ordusu'nda Strateji Sorunu Üç Genelkurmay Başkanı (Kaynak Publisher, 2008)
- Tayyip Erdoğan'ın Yüce Divan Dosyası (Kaynak Publisher)
- Ermeni Sorununda Strateji ve Siyaset (Kaynak Publisher)
- Türk Ordusu Kuşatmayı Nasıl Yaracak? (Kaynak Publisher)
- Ergenekon Savunması (Kaynak Publisher)
- Gladyo ve Ergenekon (Kaynak Publisher)
- Bilimsel Sosyalizm ve Bilim (Kaynak Publisher)
- Türkiye Solu ve PKK (Kaynak Publisher, 2013)
- Asya Çağı'nın Öncüleri (Kaynak Publisher, 2015)
- Birinci Dünya Savaşı ve Türk Devrimi (Kaynak Publisher, 2015)
- Kadın Kitabı (Kaynak Publisher, March 2016)

Party political offices
Preceded by newly founded	Leader of the Patriotic Party; February 15, 2015–present	Succeeded by incumbent
