= Timeline of Anatolian history =

Aspects of regional history

The timeline of Anatolian history covers events from the establishment of the Hittite Empire in 1600 BCE through the conquests of Alexander the Great, the Roman, Byzantine, Seljuk, and Ottoman periods, and the Republic of Turkey in the 20th and 21st centuries, including events in Anatolia as well as developments elsewhere in the states and empires that governed the region.

== 17th century BCE ==
Year	Date	Event
1600 BCE		Hittite Empire established in the region of Anatolia with capital in Hattusa near present-day Boğazkale, Turkey.

== 14th century BCE ==
Year	Date	Event
1346 BCE		Hittite empire reaches its height under the rule of Šuppiluliuma I.

== 13th century BCE ==
Year	Date	Event
1274 BCE		Battle of Kadesh between the Hittite Empire and the New Kingdom of Egypt.

== 12th century BCE ==
Year	Date	Event
1178 BCE		Collapse of the Hittite Empire, splinters into several independent Syro-Hittite states.

== 5th century BCE ==
Year	Date	Event
499–493 BCE		Ionian Revolt, military rebellion by the Greek regions of Anatolia against Persian Empire rule. Revolt is crushed.

== 4th century BCE ==
Year	Date	Event
334 BC		Alexander III of Macedon crosses the Hellespont into Asia, making his landing in present-day Turkey.
334 BC	May	Alexander III of Macedon defeats the armies of the Achaemenid Empire in the Battle of the Granicus river (modern-day Biga Çayı).
333 BC	5 November	Alexander III of Macedon defeats the armies of the Achaemenid Empire in the Battle of Issus.
323 BC	10/11 June	Alexander III dies in Babylon, triggering a division of his empire including present-day Turkey, among his generals in a treaty known as the Partition of Triparadisus.

== 2nd century BCE ==
Year	Date	Event
133 BC		The Roman invasion of Anatolia begins with the annexation of Attalid Pergamon by the Roman Republic. The entire region is later brought under Roman rule. For the next few centuries, under Roman rule, the region becomes prosperous, roads and infrastructure are built and improved and coastal communities flourish.

== 4th century ==
Year	Date	Event
324		The Roman emperor Constantine I chooses Byzantium (later known as Constantinople and currently Istanbul) to be the new capital of the Roman Empire, renaming it New Rome.
324		Constantine I becomes the first Roman emperor to convert to Christianity.
360	15 February	The Hagia Sophia Church is first consecrated by the Arian Bishop Eudoxius of Antioch.

== 5th century ==
Year	Date	Event
476		The region becomes part of the Byzantine Empire with the collapse of the Roman Empire.

== 7th century ==
Year	Date	Event
674–678		First Arab Siege of Constantinople by the Umayyad Caliphate, ends with Byzantine victory.

== 8th century ==
Year	Date	Event
717–718		Second Arab Siege of Constantinople by the Umayyad Caliphate, ends with Byzantine victory.

== 9th century ==
Year	Date	Event
863		Beginning of the Byzantine resurgence with emergence of Macedonian dynasty, most of lost territories are retaken from Arab invasions.

== 11th century ==
Year	Date	Event
1071		Alp Arslan of the Great Seljuq Empire defeats Romanos IV Diogenes of the Byzantine Empire at Malazgirt, near Muş, Historical Western Armenia (today called Eastern Anatolia)
1077		Suleyman I of Rum is appointed as a governor in Seljuq. Then he moved on to Turkey. But he acts independently and founds a state. Capital İznik (Nicea), Bursa Province, Northwest Anatolia.
1081		Tzachas, an independent Turkish sea captain, founds a principality in Smyrna, giving the Seljuks access to Aegean Sea.
1084		Conquest of Antakya (Antioch), South Anatolia.
1086		Süleyman I of Rum tries to add Syria to his realm. But he commits suicide after being defeated by his cousin Tutush I in the Battle of Ain Salm, Syria.
1092		Kılıç Arslan I (1092–1107)
1096		Kılıç Arslan I defeats Walter Sans Avoir and Peter the Hermit of People's Crusade at the battles of Xerigordon and Civetot both in Northwest Anatolia.
1097		Bohemond of Taranto, Godfrey of Bouillon and Adhemar of Le Puy of First Crusade defeat Kılıç Arslan I in the battle of Dorylaeum (near modern Eskişehir, Central Anatolia). The capital İznik is lost to Crusades. A few years later Konya, becomes the new capital.
1100		Danishmend Gazi, an independent bey, defeats Bohemond I of Antioch in the battle of Melitene (Malatya)

== 12th century ==
Year	Date	Event
1100s		12th century renaissance in the Byzantine Empire, revival of art, architecture and economic activity.
1101		Kılıç Arslan I defeats Stephen of Blois and Hugh of Vermandois of the second wave of First Crusades at the Battle of Mersivan (near modern Merzifon, Amasya Province, Central Anatolia.)
1107		Kılıç Arslan conquers Musul, Iraq, but is defeated in the battle.
1110		Şahinşah (1107–1116) (also called Melikşah, not to be confused with the sultan of Great Seljuk Empire with the same name) Continuous struggle with the Crusades weakens the state.
1116		Mesut I (1116–1156) During the early years of his reign he has to accept the dominance of Danishmends a rival Turkish state in Anatolia.
1142		Mehmed of Danishmends dies and the Sultanate of Rum becomes the leading power in Anatolia for the second time.
1147		Mesut I defeats Holy Roman Emperor Conrad III of Second Crusade in the Second battle of Dorylaeum (near modern Eskişehir)
1147		Mesud I defeats French king Louis VII of Second Crusade at Laodicea (near modern Denizli, West Anatolia).
1156		Kılıç Arslan II (1156–1192)
1176		Kılıç Arslan defeats Manuel I Komnenos of Byzantine Empire in the battle of Myriokephalon (probably near Çivril, Denizli Province, West Anatolia).
1178		Kılıç Arslan II annexes Danishmend realm. (Sivas, and the surrounding territory, Central Anatolia.)
1186		Kılıç Arslan II partitions the country into 11 provinces, each governed by one of his sons
1190		Holy Roman Emperor Frederick I Barbarossa of Third Crusade crosses West Anatolia. While main Turkish army avoids conflict, several irregular troops try to fight, but are repelled. Temporary German occupation of capital Konya.
1190		Frederick Barbarossa of Third Crusade dies near Silifke, Mersin Province in South Anatolia.
1192		Keyhüsrev I (1192–1196)
1194		After the collapse of Great Seljuk Empire, the Sultanate of Rum become the sole surviving branch of Seljuks.
1196		Suleyman II of Rum (1196–1204)

== 13th century ==
Year	Date	Event
1202		Süleyman II of Rum annexes Saltukid realm (Erzurum, and the surrounding territory, Eastern Anatolia.)
1202		Georgian army defeats Süleyman II at the Battle of Micingerd
1204		Kılıç Arslan III (1204–1205)
1205		Keyhüsrev I (1205–1211) (second time)
1207		Conquest of Antalya, access to Mediterranean Sea
1211		Keykavus I (1211–1220)
1214		Conquest of Sinop, Black Sea coast
1220		Alaaddin Kayqubad I (1220–1237)
1221		Conquest of Alanya, Antalya Province, Mediterranean coast
1223		Construction of an arsenal in Alanya, a sign of Alaaddin Keykubat's interest in maritime trade
1224		Alladdin Keykubat annexes a part of Artuqid realm (Harput and surrounding territory, .)
1225		Kayi Obasi (Tribe)
1227		Sudak in Crimea is annexed. This is the most notable overseas campaign of Seljuqs.
1228		Mongol conquests in Iran result in a flux of refugees to Anatolia, one of the refuges is Mevlana
1228		Alaaddin Keykubat I annexes Mengucek realm (Erzincan and the surrounding territory), Eastern Anatolia .
1230		Alaaddin Keykubat defeats Celaleddin Harzemşah of Harzemşah Empire in the Battle of Yassıçemen, near Erzincan
1237		Keyhüsrev II (1237–1246)
1238		Sadettin Köpek the vizier of the inexperienced sultan who has executed some members of Seljuk house and becomes the de facto ruler of the sultanate is killed.
1239		Revolt of Baba Ishak. A revolt of Turkmen (Oguz) and Harzem refugees who have recently arrived in Anatolia. The revolt is suppressed. But the sultanate loses power.
1240		Conquest of Diyarbakır in Southeast Anatolia.
1243		Bayju of Mongols defeats Keyhüsrev II in the battle of Kösedağ, Eastern Anatolia. From now on, the sultanate is a vassal of Ilkhanids.
1246		Keykavus II (1246–1262) Governs together with his two brothers. But the real ruler is vizier Pervâne who has married to late sultan's widow Gürcü Hatun.
1256		Mongols defeat Seljuk Turks at the Battle of Sultanhan, Aksaray Province, Central Anatolia.
1258		Mongols partition the country. Double sultanate
1262		Kılıç Arslan IV 1260–1266
1266		Keyhüsrev III 1266–1284
1277		Karamanoğlu Mehmet Bey, a semi independent bey, allies himself with the Mameluk sultan Baybars who invades a part of Anatolia.
1277		Karamanoğlu Mehmed Bey conquers Konya and enthrones his puppet Jimri. But Ilkhanids intervene and reestablish Keyhüsrev's reign. (During his short stay in Konya Mehmed Bey declares Turkish as the official language in his realm).
1284		Mesut II 1284–1297
1289		Seljuk-Ilkhanid coalition defeats the tribes of Germiyanids
1297		Alaaddin Kekubat III 1297–1302
1299		Osman I, founder of the Ottoman Empire, begin the Ottoman history. (According to Halil İnalcık, expert on Ottoman history, Ottoman Empire was founded in 1302 not 1299.)

== 14th century ==
Year	Date	Event
1302		Mesut II 1302–1307 (last sultan of Rum)
1371	27 September	Battle of Maritsa. Most of Macedonia is conquered.
1389	15 June	Battle of Kosovo. Most of Serbia is conquered.
1396	25 September	Battle of Nicopolis. Bulgaria is conquered.

== 15th century ==
Year	Date	Event
1444	10 November	Battle of Varna. Ottoman victory, end of Crusade of Varna.
1453		Mehmed II (the Conqueror) captures Constantinople, Christian emperor Constantine XI dies in the fighting and the Byzantine Empire yields to the Ottoman Empire as Mehmed II.
1460		Mehmed II conquers Morea.
1461		Mehmed II conquers Trabzon thus ends Empire of Trebizond.
1462		Mehmed II begins to build his palace, Topkapi Palace (Topkapı Sarayi).
1463		Bosnia is conquered.
1473		Battle of Otlukbeli; Mehmed II defeats Uzun Hasan of Akkoyunlu Turkmens.
1475		Gedik Ahmet Pasha captures Caffa. Crimea becomes vassal of the Ottoman Empire.
1478		Albania is conquered.
1480		Gedik Ahmet Pasha captures Otranto, the southeast corner of Italy, as a base for further attacks on Italy (only to evacuate after the death of Mehmet II).
1481	3 May	Mehmed II dies. Bayezid II ascended to the throne.
1482		Herzegovina is conquered.
1498		Montenegro is conquered.

== 16th century ==
Year	Date	Event
1514		Battle of Chaldiran; Selim I defeats Ismail I of Safavid Persia; Kurdistan under control of Ottoman Empire.
1516		Battle of Marj Dabiq; Selim I defeats Al-Ashraf Qansuh al-Ghawri of Mamluk Sultanate of Egypt. Syria and Palestine under Ottoman rule.
1517		Battle of Ridaniya; Selim I defeats Tuman bay II of Mamluk Sultanate of Egypt. Egypt under Ottoman rule; Selim I takes the title caliph.
1519		Algeria is conquered.
1520		The reign of Suleiman the Magnificent (Suleiman I) begins.
1521		Suleiman I captures Belgrade.
1522		Suleiman I captures Rhodes.
1526		Battle of Mohács. Suleiman I defeats Louis II of Hungary and Bohemia
1529		Siege of Vienna.
1533		Iraq under Turkish control.
1538		Sea Battle of Preveza. Turkish navy controls most of Mediterranean Sea.
1550		Sultanate of Women
1551		Libya is conquered.
1541		Suleiman I captures Budapest (known as Buda), which eventually leads to conquest of most of Hungary.
1547		Most of Hungary under Turkish control. Hungary is divided, by agreement between the Ottoman sultan Suleiman I and Ferdinand I of Austria.
1566		The reign of Suleiman the Magnificent (Suleiman I) ends.
1569		The great fire of Istanbul broke out.
1570		Conquest of Cyprus by Piyale Pasha
1571		The Spanish and the Venetians defeat the Turks at the Battle of Lepanto.
1574		Tunisia is conquered.
1578		Tbilisi and most of Georgia conquered.
1590		Treaty of İstanbul between Ottoman Empire and Safavid Persia; Georgia, Azerbaijan and Armenia as well as west Iran under Ottoman rule.

== 17th century ==
Year	Date	Event
1610		Kuyucu Murat Pasha suppresses Jelali revolts. Turkmens suffer heavily.
1612		Treaty of Nasuh Pasha between Ottoman Empire and Safavid Persia. Ottoman Empire gives up some gains of Treaty of Istanbul of 1590.
1615		Treaty of Serav ratifies Treaty of Nasuh Pasha
1683	12 September	Battle of Vienna. Ottoman defeat.
1686		Hungary evacuated.
1687		Mehmed IV is deposed.
1699		Ottomans cede Hungary to Austria in the Treaty of Karlowitz.

== 18th century ==
Year	Date	Event
1718		Treaty of Passarowitz signed.
1718		Beginning of Tulip era (up to 1730)
1729		First printing press in Turkish by Ibrahim Muteferrika
1730		Revolt of Patrona Halil. End of Tulip era. Ahmet III is dethroned.
1739		Treaty of Belgrade signed.
1774		Treaty of Küçük Kaynarca signed.
1795		First newspaper in Ottoman Empire (Bulletin de Nouvelles.)

== 19th century ==
Year	Date	Event
1807	May	Kabakçı Mustafa rebellion: Reformist sultan Selim III dethroned. New sultan is Mustafa IV
1808	21 July	Alemdar Mustafa Pasha suppresses the rebellion. But Selim III is dead and Mahmut II becomes the new sultan.
1813	23 April	Second Serbian Uprising: The Serbs revolt.
1821		Greek War of Independence: The Greek War of Independence begins.
1826	15 June	Auspicious Incident. Massacre of the Janissary corps by Sultan Mahmud II: Foundation of a modern western style army.
1830		Algeria is gradually ceded to French rule.
1832	21 July	Greek War of Independence: Greek sovereignty is formalized.
1831		Egyptian–Ottoman War. (to 1833)
1853	4 October	Crimean War: The Crimean War with Russia began which, though won with British, French and Sardinian aid, would further demonstrate how backward the Ottoman military had become.
1860	21 October	First newspaper in Turkish published by Agah Efendi.(Tercümen'ı Ahval).
1862	5 February	A united Romanian autonomous state is established.
1876	23 December	Opened the 1876–1877 Constantinople Conference.
1877	24 April	Russo-Turkish War (1877–1878): Another war with Russia begins.
1878	3 March	Russo-Turkish War (1877–1878): The Treaty of San Stefano recognizes Romanian and Serbian independence, as well as the establishment of an autonomous Bulgarian principality under nominal Ottoman protection. Austria-Hungary occupies Bosnia by default.
1878	4 June	Cyprus is occupied by Britain.
1881		Mustafa Kemal Atatürk was born. Tunisia becomes a French colony.
1882		Egypt goes under British protection.
1885	6 September	The province of Eastern Rumelia is transferred to Bulgarian jurisdiction.
1894		Hamidian massacres, where the Ottoman Empire under Sultan Abdul Hamid II kills between 200,000 and 400,000 Armenians in order to reassert Pan-Islamism as a state ideology.

== 20th century ==
Year	Date	Event
1908	3 July	Second Constitutional Era (Young Turk revolution)
1908	5 October	Bulgaria obtains full independence.
1908	7 October	Austria-Hungary annexes Bosnia by mere declaration.
1912		The Ottomans are defeated by Italy in a short war, with the Italians gaining Libya and ending the 340-year Ottoman presence in North Africa.
1912	28 November	First Balkan War: Albania declares independence
1913	17 May	First Balkan War: The Ottoman Empire is nearly wiped out from Europe, save for Istanbul and just enough land around to defend it.
1913		Greek genocide by the Ottoman Empire, lasts till about 1922. Approximately 750,000 Ottoman Greek Christians believed to have been killed.
1914		Assyrian genocide (Seyfo or Sayfo) by the Ottoman Empire, lasts till about 1924. Approximately 250,000 Assyrian Christians believed to have been killed.
1914	2 August	The Ottoman Empire enters into World War I on the side of the Central Powers. Cyprus is annexed outright by Britain.
1915	18 March	The Gallipoli Campaign was considered one of the greatest victories of the Turks at World War 1 and was reflected on as a major failure by the Allies.
1915	24 April	The Ottoman Empire initiates Genocide of Christian Armenians, over 1 million Armenians are killed.
1915		Persecution of nearly 4.000.000 Turks from Balkans started. Most of them were suffered and killed.
1923	29 October	The Republic of Turkey was proclaimed.
1923	29 October	Mustafa Kemal (Atatürk) was unanimously elected the first President of the Republic of Turkey by secret vote.
1923	30 October	The first cabinet of the Republic of Turkey was formed by İsmet İnönü.
1924		A new policy was instituted that imams be appointed by the government.
1924	3 March	The Ottoman Caliphate was abolished by the Turkish Grand National Assembly.
1924	3 March	The Union of Education (Tevhid-i Tedrisat) Law was passed.
1924	3 March	The Ministry of Religious Affairs and all religious schools were abolished.
1924	6 March	Second cabinet, again by İsmet İnönü
1924	8 April	Religious courts were abolished and replaced by civil courts.
1924	20 April	A new Turkish constitution was accepted.
1924	26 August	Türkiye İş Bankası was established.
1924	30 October	The generals who were also in parliament were asked to choose either military profession or politics but not both. (This event is known as the crisies of generals.) Only Prime Minister İsmet İnönü retains his title as general and remains in politics as prime minister.
1924	17 November	The second political party in Turkey, the Progressive Republican Party, was formed.
1924	22 November	Third cabinet by Fethi Okyar.
1925	11 February	The Sheikh Said rebellion started in the eastern provinces.
1925	25 February	A law separating religion from politics was accepted and passed in the TBMM.
1925	4 March	Fourth cabinet by İsmet İnönü
1925	5 May	An Armenian named Manok Manukyan was executed in Ankara for planning an assassination attempt on Mustafa Kemal.
1925	3 June	The Progressive Republican Party was closed and abolished for supposedly exploiting religion for political purposes. Republican Peoples Party of the governing elites remains as the only political organization in the country. According to "Takrir-i Sükun" law, all opposition newspapers are also banned and closed indefinitely and the Turkish Republic becomes one of the first Interwar dictatorships in Europe.
1925	29 June	Sheikh Said and his 46 followers were sentenced to death in Diyarbakır.
1925	27 August	Mustafa Kemal (Atatürk) came to Kastamonu to initiate the Hat Revolution.
1925	1 September	The first Turkish Medical Congress was assembled.
1925	4 September	Turkish women entered a beauty contest for the first time.
1925	1 October	Atatürk opened the Bursa textile factory.
1925	5 November	Ankara Law School (then the Ankara University Faculty of Law) was opened.
1925	25 November	"Hat Law" was issued, abolishing religious dress.
1925	26 December	A law was passed which abolished the lunar calendar in favor of the international calendar.
1926	17 February	A Turkish civil code based on the Swiss Civil Code was accepted. The code granted expanded civil rights to women and prohibited polygamy.
1926	1 March	A Turkish criminal code was established based on the Italian Criminal Code.
1926	17 March	A law was passed to nationalize the iron industry.
1926	24 March	A law was passed to nationalize the petroleum industry.
1927	7 March	The extraordinary Independence Tribunals were abolished.
1927	15 October	Mustafa Kemal Atatürk started his "Nutuk" speech.
1927	15 October	The second nationwide congress of the Republican People's Party took place.
1927	20 October	The "Nutuk" speech ended.
1927	28 October	The first population census counted the population at approximately thirteen and a half million.
1927	27 November	Fifth cabinet by İsmet İnönü
1927	25 December	The first female Turkish lawyer, Süreyya Ağaoğlu, began her duty.
1928	10 April	The article "The official religion of Turkey is Islam" was removed from the constitution.
1928	19 May	A law establishing an engineering school was accepted.
1928	1 November	A new Turkish alphabet based on the Latin script was accepted.
1929	3 April	A new municipal law enabled women to enter municipal elections both as voters and as candidates.
1929	29 April	The first female Turkish judges were appointed.
1929	13 May	A trade law was accepted by the TBMM.
1929	1 September	Arabic and Persian courses were abolished replaced by Turkish-only language courses.
1930	11 June	A law was accepted which established the Turkish Republic Central Bank.
1930	12 August	The Free Republican Party, the third party in the republic, was established.
1930	27 September	Sixth cabinet by İsmet İnönü
1930	27 October	Greek prime minister Venizelos visited Mustafa Kemal Atatürk in Ankara.
1930	17 November	After the Free Republican Party's cooption by radical religious groups, its leader Fethi Okyar decided to close.
1930	30 December	Mustafa Fehmi Kubilay, a second lieutenant in the Turkish army, was killed in a reactionary uprising.
1931	16 March	The first female Turkish surgeon, Dr. Suat, received her specialty.
1931	26 March	The Measurements Law was accepted, abolishing the former Arabic length and weight measurement units and replacing them with the metric system (kilogram instead of okka, meter instead of endaze, etc.)
1931	20 April	Mustafa Kemal Atatürk historically declared the slogan "Peace at home, peace in the world!"
1931	4 May	Seventh cabinet by İsmet İnönü
1931	25 July	A new press law was accepted.
1932	18 July	Turkey became a member of the League of Nations.
1932	31 July	Turkish woman Keriman Halis Ece was declared the World Beauty Queen at a contest in Belgium.
1932	13 November	Dr. Müfide Kazim became the first female Turkish government physician.
1932	12 December	Adile Ayda became the first female Turkish civil servant in the Ministry of Foreign Affairs.
1933	7 February	The first Turkish-language mosque prayers began in Istanbul.
1933	31 May	The 480-year-old Darülfünun was abolished, to be converted into Istanbul University.
1933	June	Sümerbank and Halkbank were established.
1933	26 October	Turkish women were granted the right to vote and be elected to Village Councils.
1933	18 November	Istanbul University was opened.
1933	1 December	The first five-year development plan was accepted.
1934	21 June	The Surname Law was accepted, abolishing the former titles of Bey, Effendi, Pasha, Sultan, and Hanım as of 26 November.
1934	24 November	Mustafa Kemal Pasha took the surname Atatürk.
1934	24 November	The Hagia Sophia mosque was converted to the Ayasofya (Hagia Sophia) Museum.
1934	5 December	Turkish women were granted the right to vote and be elected in Turkish parliamentary elections. (Afterwards, in the first elections, 18 women were elected to the Turkish Grand National Assembly).
1935	1 March	Eight cabinet by İsmet İnönü.
1936	29 May	A law determining the size and ratios of the star and crescent in the Turkish flag was accepted.
1936	8 June	A labor law was accepted which represented the first step towards the Turkish Social Security System.
1937	27 January	Hatay's independence was accepted by the League of Nations in its Geneva meeting.
1937	9 June	A law establishing a medical faculty in Ankara was accepted.
1937	20 September	Atatürk opened the first art gallery in his residence, the Dolmabahce Palace.
1937	9 October	Atatürk opened the Nazilli Printed Cloth Fabric Factory.
1937	25 October	Ninth cabinet by Celâl Bayar, former minister of Economy
		Dersim Rebellion in 1937–1938 : The revolt had quashed by government.
1938	10 November	The founder Mustafa Kemal Atatürk died. He was succeeded by İsmet İnönü, former prime minister and general. He declares himself "National Chief" (Millî Şef), similar to the titles of some other dictators in Europe at the time.
1939		World War II: World War II began. Turkey was to remain neutral for most of the war, until a declaration of war against Germany at its end.
1939	7 July	The Province of Hatay joined Turkey.
1950	14 May	First Democratic Elections in Turkish Republic. General İsmet İnönü and his Republican People's Party, which had ruled the country since 1923, loses election to newly formed Democratic Party of Celâl Bayar and Adnan Menderes.
1950	25 June	Korean War: The Korean War began. Turkey was a part of the joint UN operation.
1950		Müfide İlhan mayor of Mersin. First ever woman mayor in Turkey.
1952		Turkey became a NATO member country strategically important in countering Soviet influence.
1953	27 July	Korean War: The war ended.
1954		Turkey began to host the United States Air Force at the Incirlik Air Base as a deterrent to the Soviet Union.
1955	6 September	Istanbul Pogrom: The Istanbul Pogrom started the process of driving many Greeks and Christians from Turkey.
1955	7 September	Istanbul Pogrom: The pogrom drew to a close.
1960	27 May	38 officers of Army form a junta and organize the 1960 Turkish coup d'état. They claim the Islamists had gained influence in the government. After this clash over the "separation of religion and state/government" between İnönü's Republican People's Party and his opponents, democratically elected President Celâl Bayar and Prime Minister Adnan Menderes of Democratic Party, Prime Minister Adnan Menderes was held responsible by a kangaroo court selected by the junta and was executed with two of his ministers.
1965	14 October	Military rule bowed out to civilian rule, and former Millî Şef (National Chief) İsmet İnönü again loses a democratic election, this time to the Justice Party of Mr. Süleyman Demirel.
1971	12 March	Military officials forced an advisory committee on the government due to the increasing anarchical situation caused by the Right (fascist/capitalist) – Left (communist) clash and ineffective policies in maintaining order. Although the military were not in charge they had significant influence.
1974		Turkey invaded Cyprus in response to a Greek-backed coup on the island.
1980	12 September	The 1980 coup d'état took place. Martial law was almost immediately established and a quarter of the military (about 475,000) were mobilised to settle the resistance to the coup.
1983	6 November	After the establishment of a new 1982 Constitution, the military regime dissolved itself.
1991		After the ending of the 1991 Persian Gulf War, the Incirlik Air Base enforced the northern no-fly zones in Iraq.
1999	24 March	Kosovo War: NATO interceded in the Balkans to end a civil war in the region. Turkey was part of the mission.
1999	10 June	Kosovo War: The war ended.

== 21st century ==
Year	Date	Event
2002	June	Turkey assumed command of the International Security Assistance Force (ISAF) in Afghanistan.
2003	February	Turkey relinquished command of the ISAF.
2004	17 December	The European Union (EU) agreed to begin negotiations on the eventual accession of Turkey.
2005	14 February	Turkey assumed command of the ISAF in Afghanistan for a second time.
2005	3 October	The European Union (EU) started accession talks with Turkey. The talks did not start at the desired time due to disagreements.
2011	24 March	Turkey gave NATO the green light and allowed İzmir to become the command center of the operation to oust Muammar Gaddafi's regime in Libya.
2012		
2013	17 December	A corruption scandal to topple the ruling AKP failed.
2014		Turkey starts designing and manufacturing its own national tank Altay, helicopter Atak and drone Anka for the first time.
2014	30 March	Local elections held with the ruling AK Party displaying an overwhelming victory, especially in the motherland of Anatolia.
2014	28 August	Then Prime Minister Recep Tayyip Erdoğan chosen as the first freely elected president of the nation.
2016	15 July	Alleged attempted coup and subsequent crackdowns and purge. Over 80,000 arrested or detained, 150,000 dismissed (nearing 10% of public employees).
2017	1 January	Istanbul nightclub shooting – At least 39 people were killed and 69 people were wounded in the Reina nightclub in Beşiktaş Istanbul.
2018	19 January	The Turkish Armed Forces launched its ''Olive Branch'' land and air operation in north-western Syria, capturing large areas which was under Kurdish control.
2018	18 April	2018 Turkish general election – President Recep Tayyip Erdogan announced that early elections will take place on 24 June.
2018	12 June	Presidents of Azerbaijan, Turkey, Georgia inaugurated Trans-Anatolian gas pipeline in the central city of Eskisehir, Turkey with the participation of Petro Poroshenko, and Aleksandar Vucic.
2018	19 October	The STAR refinery has been launched in Aliaga İzmir, Turkey.
2019	9 October	2019 Turkish offensive into north-eastern Syria
2020	11 March	Turkey confirmed its first COVID-19 case, caused by the SARS-CoV-2 virus. This was quickly followed by the rapid emergence of the COVID-19 outbreak in the country.

== See also ==
- History of Turkey
- Hittites
- Sultanate of Rum
- Ottoman Empire
- Outline of the Ottoman Empire
- Timeline of the Ottoman Empire
- Republic of Turkey
- Timeline of the Republic of Turkey
- List of massacres in Turkey

Cities in Turkey

- Timeline of Ankara
- Timeline of Bursa
- Timeline of Istanbul

== Bibliography ==
- Thomas Bartlett (1841). "Turkey". New Tablet of Memory; or, Chronicle of Remarkable Events. London: Thomas Kelly.
- Charles E. Little (1900), "Turkey", Cyclopedia of Classified Dates, New York: Funk & Wagnalls
- Henry Smith Williams, ed. (1908). "Chronological Summary of the History of Turkey". Historians' History of the World. Vol. 24. London: Hooper & Jackson. hdl:2027/njp.32101063964728.
- Benjamin Vincent (1910), "Turkey", Haydn's Dictionary of Dates (25th ed.), London: Ward, Lock & Co.
- Suraiya N. Faroqhi, ed. (2006). "Chronology". Cambridge History of Turkey. Cambridge University Press. ISBN 978-0-521-62095-6.
