= Menemen Incident =

Revolt of the Islamists against the secularization in Turkey

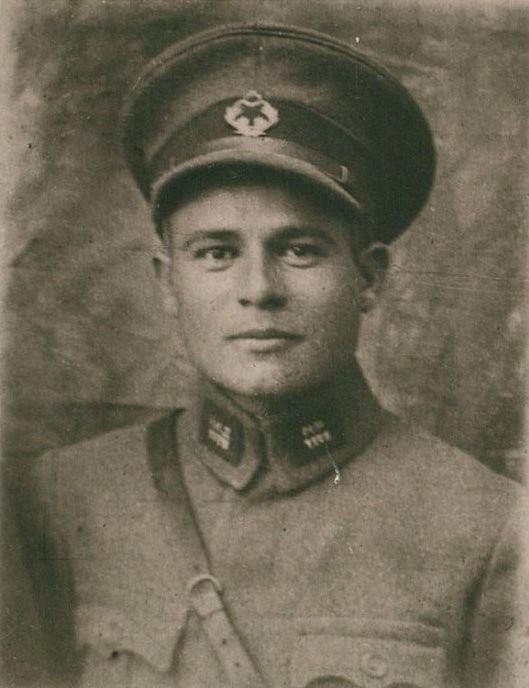
Mustafa Fehmi Kubilay

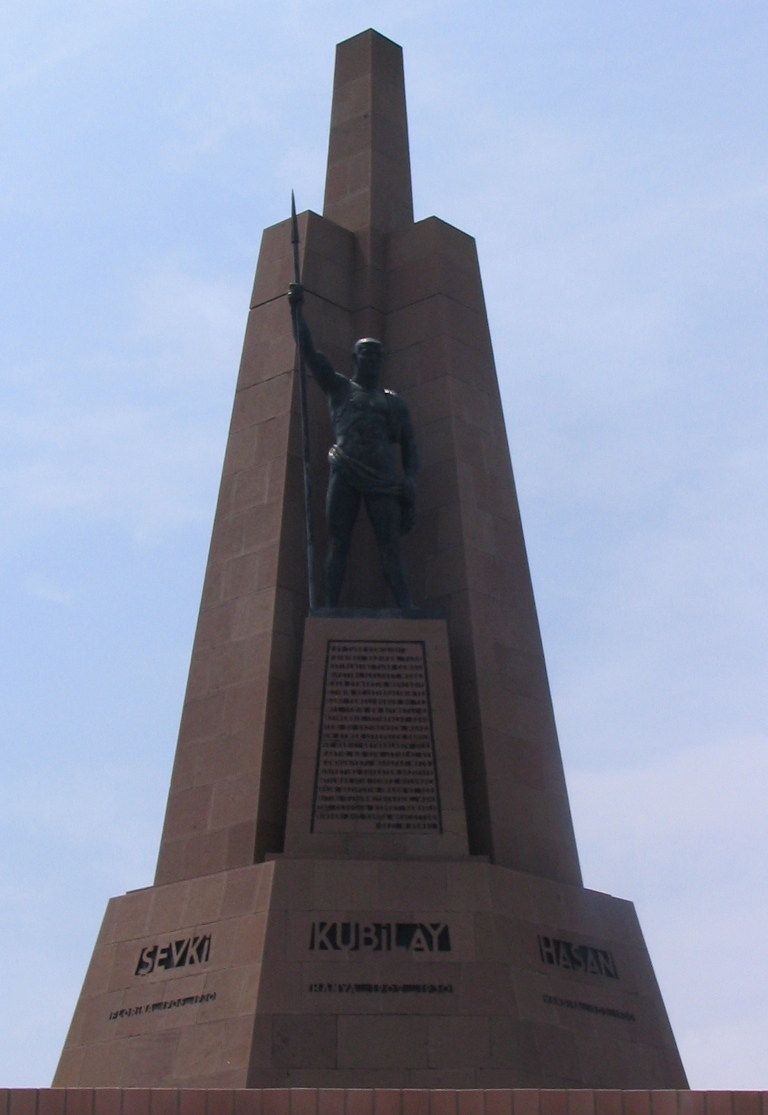
Martyr Kubilay Memorial in Menemen, İzmir

The Menemen Incident, or Kubilay Incident (Turkish: Kubilay Olayı or Menemen Olayı), refers to a chain of events which occurred in Menemen, a small town north of İzmir in the Aegean region of Turkey, on 23 December 1930.

Islamists rebelled against the secularization of Turkey by Atatürk and beheaded Mustafa Fehmi Kubilay, a teacher who was doing his military service and two other watchmen.

== Rebellion ==
Following the signing of the Treaty of Lausanne in 1923, the Republican People's Party of Turkey pursued a somewhat liberal policy towards Islam, promoting secularism while not taking a hard line against Islamic institutions and practices, believing that the secularism of their ideology was already taking root. This confidence was shaken on 23 December 1930, when Dervish Mehmet Efendi (Cretan Mehmet), a member of the Naqshbandi (Turkish: Nakşibendi) order, created a protest by rallying an armed crowd against the policies of the secular government and calling for the restoration of Sharia and the Caliphate. A squad of soldiers from the local garrison was sent to quell the demonstration. The leader of the soldiers, Mustafa Fehmi Kubilay, went into the crowd alone to convince them to surrender. A rebel shot and injured him and as a result the soldiers returned fire (using wooden bullets) upon the demonstrators.

The protestors, led by Derviş Mehmed shouted ''Those who wear hats are kafirs. We will return to sharia soon.''

Mustafa Fehmi Kubilay, who had hidden himself in a mosque, was beheaded by the crowd with an axe who then placed his severed head on a pole with a green flag and paraded through town with it. Two municipal watchmen, Bekçi Hasan and Bekçi Şevki, were also killed by the demonstrators. Several rioters were also killed.

Upon hearing Kubilay's murder by Islamists, Atatürk proclaimed: ''Thousands from Menemen didn't prevent this, instead joined with Tekbirs. Where were these traitors during Greek occupation?''. The Turkish government expressed their shock over the people of Menemen not reacting to things like Menemen massacre as harsh as they did to secularization.

The perpetrators of the rebellion including Mehmet the Cretan, İbrahim the Cretan, Mehmet of Damascus, Sütçü Mehmet Emin, Nalıncı Hasan, and Hasan the Little were killed or otherwise punished.

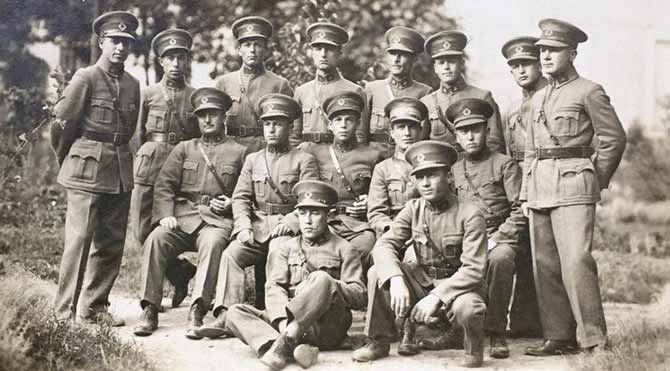
Mustafa Fehmi Kubilay, standing on the far-right

== Government reaction ==
The new republican government of Turkey was shocked by the demonstration of religious fervor and by how readily it was embraced by some Turks, as it was completely antithetical to secularism. A state of emergency was declared and courts-martial were established which meted out sentences ranging from death at the gallows or life imprisonment to one year's confinement. There were also several acquittals. Sufi members were arrested around the country. Furthermore, it demonstrated that secularism was taking hold neither as quickly nor as deeply as the government would have liked. This spurred the government to action, and they began a more aggressive secularization reforms in response to the Menemen incident. The government carried out this policy by attempting to nationalise Islam through performing the Adhan (Turkish: Ezan) or call to prayer, in Turkish rather than Arabic. The government furthered secularization in schools by having the Quran translated from Arabic into Turkish and read to the people on the radio and in the mosques in Turkish. These attempts reflected a comprehensive effort by the government to remove Islamic influences and entrench nationality over religion in Turkish culture. These efforts also showed a larger attempt on the part of the government to consolidate Turkish traditions and promote a Turkish identity to replace a dominantly Muslim one, as in the Ottoman Empire people were identified by the millet system according to their religion rather than ethnicity. These were done to replace the last vestiges of nostalgia for the abolished Caliphate and the broken-up Ottoman Empire in the aftermath of World War I.

== Legacy ==
The monument of the Menemen Incident features a tall sculpture by Ratip Aşir Acudoğu which was erected in 1932. The Kubilay Memorial is a part of Kubilay Barracks, but open to the public. The area is landscaped and illuminated at night. A military honor guard stands continuous watch at the memorial site, which contains the graves of several Turkish soldiers who were killed in the line of duty. In the aftermath, 37 people were executed and 41 more received prison sentences.

- Cem Karaca - Bir Öğretmene Ağıt (song written in Kubilay's memory)
