= Menemen Gediz Bridge =

Menemen Gediz Bridge Menemen Gediz Köprüsü
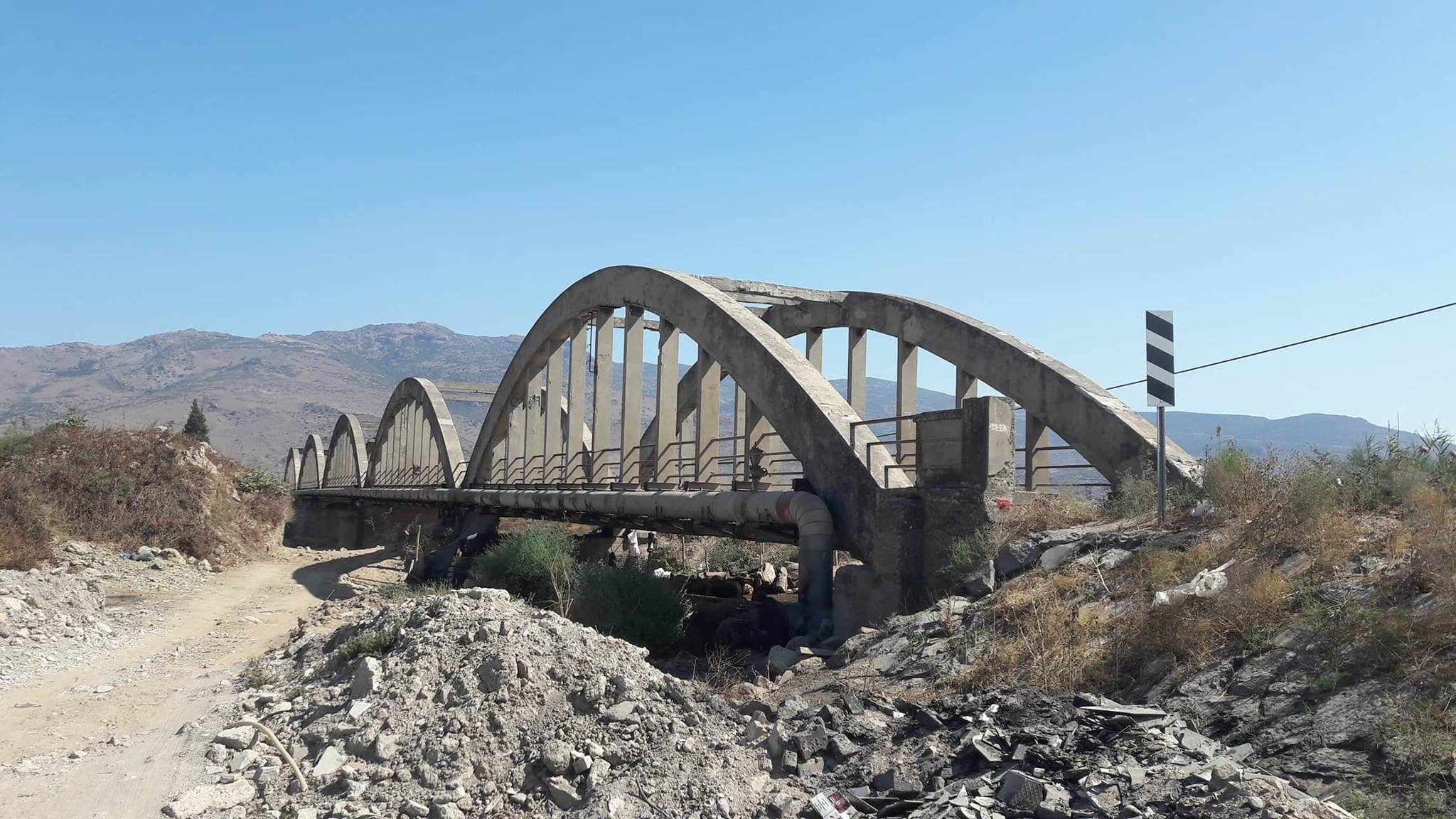
- View from the southwest
- Coordinates: 38°38′57.4″N 27°03′03.6″E
- Carries: 2 lanes of Çavuşköy-Yanıkköy Road
- Crosses: Gediz River
- Locale: Menemen, İzmir Province
- Official name: Governor Kâzım Dirik Bridge
- Named for: Kâzım Dirik
- Owner: General Directorate of Highways
- Heritage status: 27 November 2014

Characteristics
- Total length: 156.6 m (514 ft)

History
- Construction start: 21 February 1933
- Construction end: 27 February 1935; 90 years ago
- Construction cost: 163,144 Turkish lira
- Inaugurated: 31 July 1935
- Replaces: First Gediz Bridge
- Replaced by: Buruncuk Bridge

Location
- Interactive map of Menemen Gediz Bridge

The Menemen Gediz Bridge (Turkish: Menemen Gediz Köprüsü) (Note: also known as the Old Gediz Bridge (Turkish: Eski Gediz Köprüsü), officially named the Governor Kâzım Dirik Bridge (Turkish: Cumhurluk Vali Kâzım Dirik Köprüsü) and historically called the Buruncuk Bridge (Turkish: Buruncuk Köprüsü)) is a bowstring-arch bridge in Turkey that crosses the Gediz River near Menemen. It is 156.6 m (514 ft) long. Completed in 1935, the bridge was one of the first five reinforced concrete bridges built by the Republic of Turkey.

On 27 November 2014, the bridge was given heritage status by the Turkish Culture and Tourism Board.

== History ==
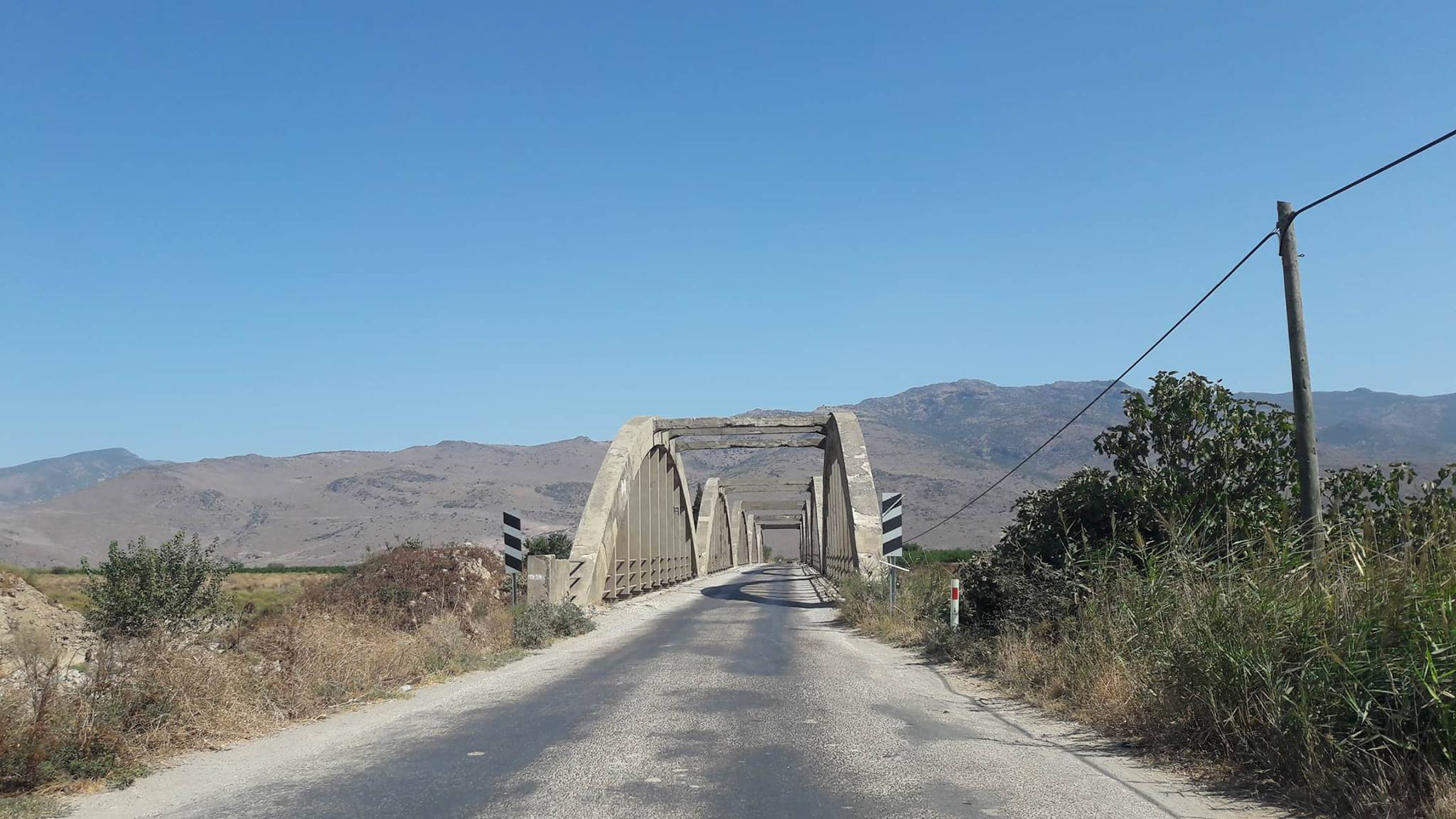
Looking northeast across the bridge

The coastal route north from Smyrna (modern-day İzmir) to Bergama was an important trading route for centuries. The main natural obstacle along the route was the Gediz river, running through the mostly flat Gediz Plain just north of Menemen. Despite the importance of the route, no bridge had been constructed across the river, forcing travelers to wade through the water. This proved to be a difficult task for caravans and horse-drawn carriages.

An alternate route opened in 1890, when the Smyrna Cassaba Railway built a railway to Soma (37.7 km (23.4 mi) east of Bergama), from its main line at Manisa. This allowed for a faster route to Smyrna, despite traveling further inland. During World War I, a wooden bridge was constructed over the Gediz near Buruncuk to allow for quicker troop movement in the region. After the war, the bridge continued to exist along the route, but was in need of constant repair.

Plans to build a new bridge across the river were put forth by the Turkish government in 1932. The concession was first awarded to a Turkish contractor, Hayri Kayadelen, at a cost of 163,144 Turkish liras. Shortly after, the concession was transferred to another Turkish company under Mehmet Galip and Fescizade İbrahim. The contract was finalized and construction began on 21 February 1932, under the supervision of Turkish, Bulgarian and Hungarian engineers. During construction of the new bridge, the existing wooden bridge was still utilized by the workers and the public. The structure was completed on 27 February 1935 consisting of five reinforced concrete bowstring-arches. A few days later, on 8 March, a heavy storm caused severe flooding from the river. This flooding destroyed a large portion of the wooden bridge and forced repairs on the new bridge. The accident forced İzmir governor Kâzım Dirik to personally apologize to villagers and residents in the area and oversee the repair process.

After repairs were finished and the road completed, the bridge was inaugurated with an official ceremony on 31 July 1935. Minister of Transport Ali Çetinkaya and Kâzım Dirik, along with local mayors and the engineers and workers all attended the ceremony. The bridge was named Governor Kâzım Dirik Bridge by the Turkish Ministry of Public Works for Dirik's efforts overseeing repairs after the flooding.

In 1950, with the formation of the Turkish State Highway System, the route was designated part of the D.550 state highway until the 1990s when the highway was expanded to four lanes, and a new bridge over the Gediz was constructed just northwest.
