= Kaymakam Kemal Bey =

Kemal Bey
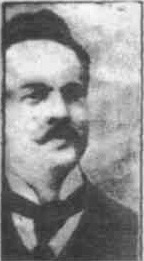
- Born: Istanbul, Turkey
- Died: 17 June 1919; Menemen, Turkey
- Occupation: Kaymakam (provincial governor)
- Known for: Murdered in the Menemen massacre

Kaymakam Kemal Bey (? – 17 June 1919) was the Ottoman kaymakam (district governor) of the town of Menemen, and is known for his assassination during the Menemen Massacre in 1919. He was among the notables of the Ottoman Muslim community of Menemen, who were killed by the Greek army during the Greco-Turkish War (1919–22). He is commemorated by a monument in the town.

== Life and political career ==
Kemal was born in Istanbul, modern Turkey. He first became the kaymakam of Bergama and was later transferred to the nearby town of Menemen during the World War I. While serving there he was bethrothed to a girl in Istanbul.

The town of Menemen had some 20.000 inhabitants, including a mixed population of Turks and Greeks. Some of the local Greeks in the town and region were persecuted and fled to Greece during the war. When the war ended Greece invaded western Anatolia during the Greco-Turkish War (1919–22). Menemen was occupied on 22 May 1919 by the Greeks. Kemal was opposed to their occupation. Some months later, the battle of Bergama took place, after which some retreating Greek soldiers initiated a massacre in Menemen. On 17 June 1922 the massacre took place and Kemal was murdered. This massacre was later investigated by an allied commission led by 4 generals who found the Greeks solely responsible. The Turks complained that his body was not allowed to be buried according to Islamic procedures.

The town of Menemen was retaken by the Turkish army on 9 September 1922, this event is annually commemorated along with the death of Kemal Bey. In 1932 a memorial to Kaymakam Kemal Bey was erected in the town and here he is annually commemorated.
