= Timeline of the Ottoman Empire =

Major events within the Ottoman Empire throughout history

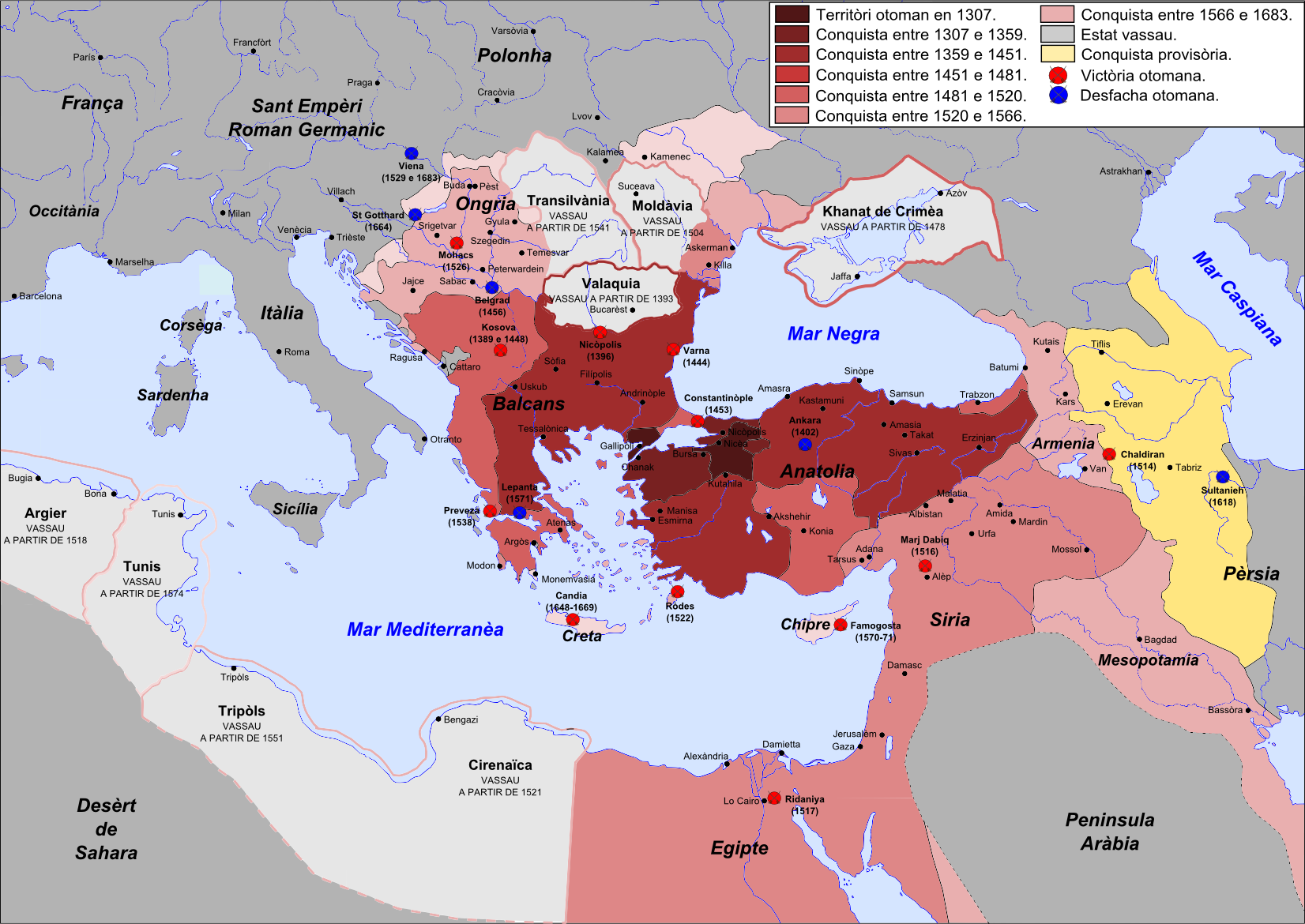
A map of the territorial expansion of the Ottoman Empire from 1307 to 1683.

== 14th century ==
Year	Date	Event
AD. 1298		The reign of Osman I, founder of the Ottoman Empire, began.
1302	July 27	Battle of Bapheus. The first war between the Ottomans and Byzantines.
1326		Orhan Gazi's accession to the throne.
1326		Siege of Bursa. The Ottomans conquered Bursa. After the conquest the city was the capital.
1329	June 10–11	Battle of Pelekanon. The Ottomans completed their conquest of Bithynia and the north-western corner of Anatolia.
1328–1331	March 2	Siege of Nicaea. The Ottomans conquered Nicaea.
1362	March	Orhan Gazi's death. Murad I accession to the throne.
1365		Battle of Sırp Sındığı. Bulgaria had to pay taxes, and the decline of the Bulgarian Empire.
1369		Edirne was conquered. From 1413 to 1458 the city was the capital.
1371	September 27	Battle of Maritsa. Serbia was forced to declare loyalty to the Ottoman Empire.
1385-87		Battle of Pločnik
1389	June 15	Battle of Kosovo. Most of Serbia is conquered. Murad I lost his life in this war. Bayezid I accession to the throne.
1396	September 25	Battle of Nicopolis. Bulgaria was conquered by Bayezid I
1399		The Bursa great mosque was built by the Bayezid I. The first to be built by the Ottoman Darü'ş-şifa (worship and education center) Bayezid I.

== 15th century ==
Year	Date	Event
1402	July 20	Battle of Ankara. Ottomans entered the short-term period of stagnation. The battle is also significant in Ottoman history as being the only time a Sultan has been captured in person.
1402–1413		Ottoman Interregnum or Ottoman Civil War. Bayezid I is taken prisoner in 1402 at the Battle of Ankara by the Turco-Mongol warlord Tamerlane and dies in captivity three months later. Crumbling Ottoman unity is restored by Mehmed I in 1413.
1413	July 5	Battle of Çamurlu. Mehmed I accession to the throne.
1421	May 26	Murad II accession to throne.
1422		Siege of Constantinople (1422). The first comprehensive siege of Constantinople by the Ottomans.
1427–1428		Germiyanids was conquered by the Ottomans.
1432	March 30	Mehmet the Conqueror's birth.
1443–1444		Crusade of Varna
1444	November 10	Battle of Varna. Morea and Bulgaria were connected to the Ottoman State. This began to increase the authority of the Ottoman Empire in the Balkans.
1448	October 17–20	Battle of Kosovo II. Balkans fully entered Ottoman rule.
1453	May 29	Mehmed II (the Conqueror) captures Constantinople, and the final Byzantine emperor Constantine XI dies in the fighting.
1459		Serbia was conquered.
1460		Mehmed II conquers Morea.
1461		Mehmed II conquers Trabzon thus ends Empire of Trebizond.
1461		Isfendiyarids joined the Ottoman lands.
1462		Mehmed II begins to build his Topkapi Palace.
1463		Bosnia was conquered.
1463–1479		Ottoman–Venetian War
1473		Battle of Otlukbeli; Mehmed II defeats Uzun Hasan of Akkoyunlu Turkmens.
1475		Gedik Ahmet Pasha captures Caffa. Crimea becomes vassal of the Ottoman Empire.
1478		Albania is conquered.
1480		Gedik Ahmet Pasha captures Otranto, the southeast corner of Italy as a base for further attacks on Italy (only to evacuate after the death of Mehmet II).
1481	May 3	Mehmed II dies. Bayezid II ascended to the throne.
1481		Sultan Cem and Bayezid II has experienced a struggle for the throne between. This event is important for the Ottoman history. There has been standstill and internal conflicts.
1482		Duchy of Saint Sava was conquered.
1485–1491		Ottoman–Mamluk War
1487		Karamanids was conquered.
1498		Zeta was conquered.
1499–1503		Ottoman–Venetian War (1499–1503)

== 16th century ==
Year	Date	Event
1512	April 24	Selim I, the Inflexible ascension to throne.
1514	August 23	Battle of Chaldiran; Selim I defeats Ismail I of the Safavids; East Anatolia under Ottoman control for the first time.
1516	August 24	Battle of Marj Dabiq; Selim I defeats Al-Ashraf Qansuh al-Ghawri of Mamluk Sultanate of Egypt. Syria and Palestine under Ottoman rule.
1517	January 22	Battle of Ridaniya; Selim I defeats Tuman bay II of Mamluk Sultanate of Egypt. Egypt under Ottoman rule.
1517		Piri Reis; presented the first world map of the Selim I.
1519		Hayreddin Barbarossa, ruler of much of Algeria, agrees to become a provincial governor under the Ottomans.
1519		Jelali revolts.
1520		The reign of Suleiman the Magnificent (Suleiman I) begins.
1521		Suleiman I conquers Belgrade.
1522		Suleiman I captures Rhodes.
1526		Battle of Mohács. Suleiman I defeats Louis II of Hungary and Bohemia.
1529		Suleiman I besieges Vienna.
1532		Suleiman I besieges Közseg.
1534–1536		Suleiman I leads the Two Iraqs campaign against the Safavids, annexing Baghdad.
1536		Pargalı Ibrahim Pasha was executed.
1537		Suleiman I besieges Korfu.
1538		The Holy League navy is defeated in the Battle of Preveza.
1541		Conquest of Buda and establishment of Ottoman rule over Hungary.
1543		Suleiman I besieges Esztergom.
1548		Campaign to Iran.
1551		Siege of Tripoli (1551). Tripoli is taken over.
1552	August	Capture of Muscat. Muscat in the management of the Portuguese Empire, Seized by the Ottomans.
1553	October 6	Execution of Şehzade Mustafa, the crown prince during the 12th campaign of Suleyman.
1555		Peace of Amasya signed with the Safavid Empire. Western Armenia (Eastern Anatolia), western Georgia (incl. western Samtskhe), and western Kurdistan fall in Ottoman hands. The latter also gained control over most of Mesopotamia (Iraq). Eastern Armenia, Eastern Georgia (incl. eastern Samtskhe), Dagestan, and Shirvan (present-day Azerbaijan Republic) remain under Safavid rule.
1560		Battle of Djerba
1565		Failed siege of Malta.
1565	December	The Ottoman-Macedonian wars begin with the commencement of the Mariovo and Prilep rebellion. The Macedonian revolutionaries storm through the town of Prilep causing a conflict, the Ottoman janissaries later suppress the revolt.
1566	September 6	The reign of Suleiman the Magnificent (Suleiman I) ends. Siege of Szigetvár. Selim II accession to throne.
1568		The great fire of Istanbul Burns.
1570–1573		Ottoman–Venetian War (1570–73). Conquest of Cyprus.
1571		Battle of Lepanto. The Holy League defeated the Ottomans.
1571		Fire of Moscow (1571). Crimean khan Devlet I Giray raided the city of Moscow.
1574		Conquest of Tunis. Selim II death. Murad III accession to the throne.
1575		Selimiye Mosque was built by architect Mimar Sinan between 1569 and 1575.
1578		Ottoman–Safavid War (1578–90). When this war ended, the Ottomans reached the widest extent in the east.
1590		Treaty of İstanbul between Ottoman Empire and the Safavids; Georgia, Azerbaijan and Armenia as well as western Iran under Ottoman rule. Reaching the widest border in the east of the Ottomans.
1593	June 22	Battle of Sisak
1593–1606		Long Turkish War. The series of wars that lasted 13 years, ended with the Peace of Zsitvatorok.
1595	January 16	Mehmet III accession to throne.
1596	October 23–26	Battle of Keresztes

== 17th century ==
Year	Date	Event
1603–1618		Ottoman–Safavid War. The Ottomans lost all the lands they won with the Ferhat Pasha Treaty.
1609		Kuyucu Murad Pasha suppresses the Jelali revolts.
1612		Treaty of Nasuh Pasha between Ottoman Empire and Safavid Persia. Ottoman Empire gives up all gains made by Treaty of Istanbul of 1590.
1618		Treaty of Serav signed with the Safavid Empire after further losses in the Ottoman–Safavid War (1603–18).
1622	May 20	Regicide of Osman II.
1622		Revolt of Abaza Mehmed Pasha.
1639		Treaty of Zuhab signed with the Safavid Empire. Roughly restored the borders as agreed per the Peace of Amasya (1555). Decisive partition of the Caucasus, recognition of Ottoman control of Mesopotamia (Iraq). Western Georgia (incl. all of Samtskhe this time) and Western Armenia decisively fall in Turkish hands. Eastern Georgia, Eastern Armenia, Dagestan, and Shirvan (present-day Azerbaijan Republic) remain under Iranian control.
1648		Deposition of Sultan Ibrahim, enthronement of Mehmed IV.
1649	May 12	Battle of Focchies
1651	September 2	Assassination of Kösem Sultan.
1656		Köprülü Mehmed Pasha is appointed Grand Vizier, inaugurating the Köprülü political dynasty, a family of viziers, warriors, and statesmen who dominated the administration of the empire during the last half of the 17th century, an era known as the Köprülü era (c. 1656–1703).
1658		Köprülü Mehmed carries out extensive purges of the imperial cavalry.
1658		Revolt of Abaza Hasan Pasha.
1658		Ottoman conquest of Ineu (Yanova).
1661		Death of Köprülü Mehmed Pasha. His son Fazıl Ahmed Pasha becomes Grand Vizier.
1663–1664		Austro-Turkish War. War ended with the Peace of Vasvár.
1669		Ottoman conquest of Heraklion (Kandiye).
1672–1676		Polish–Ottoman War. Ottoman conquest of Kamianets-Podilskyi (Kamaniçe). The war end of the Ottoman Empire reached its maximum size in europe.
1676		Death of Fazıl Ahmed Pasha. His brother-in-law Merzifonlu Kara Mustafa Pasha becomes Grand Vizier.
1683	September 12	Battle of Vienna. Ottoman defeat.
1683	December 25	Execution of Merzifonlu Kara Mustafa Pasha.
1686		Buda lost to the Austrian Habsburgs.
1687		Deposition of Mehmed IV.
1689	October 20	An uprising occurs in Ottoman Macedonia, known as the Karposh's Rebellion.
1697	September 11	Battle of Zenta. Ottoman defeat. Grand Vizier was killed.
1699		Ottomans cede most of Hungary to Austria in the Treaty of Karlowitz.

== 18th century ==
Year	Date	Event
1715		Morea recaptured.
1718		Treaty of Passarowitz signed.
1718		Beginning of Tulip era (up to 1730).
1729		First printing press in Turkish by Ibrahim Muteferrika.
1730		Revolt of Patrona Halil. End of Tulip era. Ahmet III is dethroned.
1739		Treaty of Belgrade signed.
1770	July 5–7	Battle of Çeşme, the first of a number of disastrous fleet battles for the Ottomans against Russia.
1774		Treaty of Küçük Kaynarca signed.
1791	4 August	Treaty of Sistova
1792	9 January	Treaty of Jassy

== 19th century ==
Year	Date	Event
1804	February 14	First Serbian Uprising: The Serbian Revolution begins.
1807	May	Kabakçı Mustafa rebellion: Reformist sultan Selim III dethroned.
1808	July 21	Alemdar Mustafa Pasha suppresses the rebellion. But Selim III is dead and Mahmut II becomes the new sultan.
1813	April 23	Second Serbian Uprising: The Serbs revolt.
1821		Greek War of Independence: The Greek War of Independence begins.
	1 September	Massacre of Samothrace,around 2,000 Greeks were massacred by Ottoman army.
1826	June 15	Auspicious Incident: centuries old Janissary corps forcibly disbanded after a rebellion against Mahmud II.
1830		Algeria is conquered by the French.
1831	November 11	First official newspaper in Turkish published. (Takvim-i Vekayi).
1832	July 21	Greek War of Independence: Greek sovereignty is formalized.
1831–1833		Egyptian–Ottoman War
1833	July 8	Treaty of Hunkar Iskelesi Russia helped Ottoman empire against Egyptian threat and confirmed its protection.
1838		Anglo-Ottoman Treaty opens the empire to free trade of European powers.
1839		Tanzimat period
1853	October 4	Crimean War: The Crimean War with Russia begins, with Britain, France and Sardinia joining on the Ottoman side.
1860	October 21	First private newspaper in Turkish published by Agah Efendi.(Tercümen'ı Ahval).
1862	February 5	A united Romanian autonomous state is established.
1875	October 30	Ottomans default on their public debt, having first entered into loan contracts with its European creditors shortly after the beginning of the Crimean War.
1876	December 23	Opened the 1876–1877 Constantinople Conference, which ends the Tanzimat reforms after they bankrupt the Empire.
1877	April 24	Russo-Turkish War (1877–1878): Another war with Russia, the Russo-Turkish War of 1877–1878, begins.
1878	March 3	Russo-Turkish War (1877–1878): The Treaty of San Stefano recognizes Romanian and Serbian independence, as well as the establishment of an autonomous Bulgarian principality under nominal Ottoman protection. Austria-Hungary occupies Bosnia by default.
1878	June 4	Cyprus is occupied by Britain.
1881		Tunisia becomes a French colony.
1882		Egypt goes under British protection.
1885	September 6	The province of Eastern Rumelia is transferred to Bulgarian jurisdiction.
1894-1897		Hamidian massacres,approx 300,000 Armenians and Assyrians were massacred(Among them some are forcefully converted) in the Ottoman Empire.It was the result of Sultan Abdul Hamid II's Pan-Islamism policy.
1896	26 August	Occupation of the Ottoman Bank in Istanbul by members of the Armenian Revolutionary Federation.They(28 armed men and women) were led by Papken Siuni and Armen Garo.Result was death of ten of Armenian nationalists and Ottoman soldiers.Other members in the takeover were arrested.After that the matter got very worse and pathetic.Around 6,000 Armenians residing in the city of Istanbul were killed by Ottoman softas and bashibazouks,armed by the Sultan in retribution against ordinary Armenian populace.

== 20th century ==
Year	Date	Event
1908		Second Constitutional Era (Young Turk revolution).
1908	October 5	Bulgaria obtains full independence.
1908	October 7	Austria-Hungary annexes Bosnia by mere declaration.
1911	November 11	Italo-Turkish War: The Ottomans are defeated by Italy in a short war, with the Italians gaining Libya and ending the 340-year Ottoman presence in North Africa.
1912	October 8	First Balkan War: Albania declares independence.
1913	May 17	First Balkan War: The Ottoman Empire is nearly wiped out from Europe, save for Istanbul and just enough land around to defend it.
1914	August 2	The Empire enters into World War I on the side of the Central Powers. Cyprus is annexed outright by Britain.
1915	April 24	The Ottoman Empire initiates forced deportation of Armenians.
1915	April 25	The Gallipoli Campaign: Under the command of Mustafa Kemal, the Ottoman army successfully repels Britain invasion of the Dardanelles in Turkey.
1915	December 7	Siege of Kut. Ottoman defense just outside of Baghdad, leading to a major defeat for the British. Largest mass surrender of a British army since Yorktown (American revolutionary war).
1917	February 23	Russian Revolution occurs, ceasing hostilities in the Caucasus, allowing Enver Pasha to establish the Army of Islam and retake lands in eastern Anatolia from Russia, ultimately to pre-war borders.
	8-11 March	Capture of Baghdad by British Army from the Ottomans.Around 9,000 of Ottoman empire's sixth army surrendered to British forces.
	17 November-30 December	Battle of Jerusalem,Allied forces capture Jerusalem from the Ottomans.25,000 soldiers were lost by Ottomans in this campaign.British PM David Lloyd George, described the capture as "a Christmas present for the British people".
1918	26 October	Charge at Haritan,last military action by Ottoman army in first world war where Ottomans held the charge but later retreated to Deir el Jemel after the battle was over.British army took the position.
	October 30	Armistice of Mudros, ending hostilities in the Middle Eastern theater of World War I, including Clause VII, stating that "The Allies to have the right to occupy any strategic points in the event of any situation arising which threatens the security of the Allies." This clause was subsequently used by the Greeks, Italians, French, and British to occupy parts of Ottoman lands felt to be in their territorial interests.
1919	May 15	Greek troops land in and occupy Izmir (classical Smyrna), with Allied approval. Greek atrocities begin on the local Turkish Muslim civilian population, leading to widespread Turkish disaffection.
1919	May 19	Turkish War of Independence commences.
1920	August 10	Treaty of Sèvres, marking the beginning of the partitioning of the Ottoman Empire. Rejected by Turkish nationalists and eventually leads to the abolition of the monarchy by the Government of the Grand National Assembly based in Ankara.
1922	November 1	Abolition of the Ottoman dynasty by Republic of Turkey.
1923	July 24	Treaty of Lausanne signed.
1924	March 3	Abolition of the Caliphate by Grand National Assembly of Turkey.

== See also ==
- Outline of the Ottoman Empire
- List of Ottoman sieges and landings
- Timeline of Turks (500-1300)
- Timeline of the Seljuk Sultanate of Rûm
- List of Ottoman Empire territories
- List of cities conquered by the Ottoman Empire
- Timeline of Ottoman Syria history

== Bibliography ==
- George Henry Townsend (1867), "Ottoman Empire", A Manual of Dates (2nd ed.), London: Frederick Warne & Co.
- Halil İnalcık and Donald Quataert, ed. (1994). "Chronology of Ottoman history, 1260-1914". An Economic and Social History of the Ottoman Empire, 1300-1914. Cambridge University Press. ISBN 978-0-521-34315-2.Karen Armstrong (2001), "Chronology; Chapter 4: Islam Triumphant, The Ottoman Empire", Islam: A Short History, London: Phoenix Publishing

== See also ==
- Timeline of the Republic of Turkey (1923–present)
- Rise of the Ottoman Empire
- Kayı tribe
- Socioeconomics of Enlargement Era (Ottoman Empire)
- Classical Age of the Ottoman Empire
- Classical Age of the Ottoman Empire
- Transformation of the Ottoman Empire
- Stagnation of the Ottoman Empire
- Decline of the Ottoman Empire
