= Timeline of the Republic of Turkey =

External Timeline	A graphical timeline is available at History of the Republic of Turkey

This is a timeline of the Republic of Turkey. To read about the background to these events, see History of the Republic of Turkey. See also the List of presidents of Turkey.

See also Timeline of the Ottoman Empire, a chronology of the predecessor state to the Republic of Turkey.

This timeline is incomplete; some important events may be missing. Please help add to it.

== One-party period (1923–1945) ==
Year	Date	Event
1923	October 29	The Republic of Turkey was proclaimed.
1923	October 29	Mustafa Kemal (Atatürk) was unanimously elected the first President of the Republic of Turkey by secret vote.
1923	October 30	The first cabinet of the Republic of Turkey was formed by İsmet İnönü.
1924		A new policy was instituted that imams be appointed by the government.
1924	March 3	The Ottoman caliphate was abolished by the Turkish Grand National Assembly.
1924	March 3	The Union of Education (Tevhid-i Tedrisat) Law was passed.
1924	March 3	The Ministry of Religious Affairs and all religious schools were abolished.
1924	March 6	Second cabinet, again by İsmet İnönü
1924	April 8	Religious courts were abolished and replaced with civil courts.
1924	April 20	A new Turkish constitution was accepted.
1924	August 26	Türkiye Is Bankasi was established.
1924	October 30	The generals who were also in parliament were asked to choose either military profession or politics but not both. (This event is known as the crisis of generals.)
1924	November 17	The second political party in Turkey, the Progressive Republican Party, was formed.
1924	November 22	Third cabinet by Ali Fethi Okyar.
1925	February 11	The Sheikh Said rebellion started in the eastern provinces.
1925	February 25	A law separating religion from politics was accepted and passed in the TBMM.
1925	March 4	Fourth cabinet by İsmet İnönü
1925	May 5	An Armenian named Manok Manukyan was executed in Ankara for planning an assassination attempt on Mustafa Kemal.
1925	June 3	The Progressive Republican Party was closed and abolished for exploiting religion for political purposes.
1925	June 29	Sheikh Said and his 46 followers were sentenced to death in Diyarbakır.
1925	August 27	Mustafa Kemal came to Kastamonu to initiate the Hat Revolution.
1925	September 1	The first Turkish Medical Congress was assembled.
1925	September 4	Turkish women entered a beauty contest for the first time.
1925	October 1	Atatürk opened the Bursa textile factory.
1925	November 5	Ankara Law School (then the Ankara University Faculty of Law) was opened.
1925	November 25	"Hat Law" was issued, abolishing religious dress.
1925	December 26	A law was passed which abolished the lunar calendar in favor of the international calendar.
1926	February 17	A Turkish civil code based on the Swiss Civil Code was accepted. The code granted expanded civil rights to women and prohibited polygamy.
1926	March 1	A Turkish criminal code was established based on the Italian Criminal Code.
1926	March 17	A law was passed to nationalise the iron industry.
1926	March 24	A law was passed to nationalise the petroleum industry.
1927	March 7	The extraordinary Independence Tribunals were abolished.
1927	October 15	Mustafa Kemal Atatürk started his "Nutuk" speech.
1927	October 15	The second nationwide congress of the Republican People's Party took place.
1927	October 20	The "Nutuk" speech ended.
1927	October 28	The first population census counted the population at approximately thirteen and a half million.
1927	November 27	Fifth cabinet by İsmet İnönü
1927	December 25	The first female Turkish lawyer, Süreyya Ağaoğlu, began her duty.
1928	April 10	The article "The official religion of Turkey is Islam" was removed from the constitution.
1928	May 19	A law establishing an engineering school was accepted.
1928	November 1	A new Turkish alphabet based on the Latin alphabet was accepted.
1929	April 3	A new municipal law enabled women to enter municipal elections both as voters and as candidates.
1929	April 29	The first female Turkish judges were appointed.
1929	May 13	A trade law was accepted by the TBMM.
1929	September 1	Arabic and Persian courses were abolished replaced by Turkish-only language courses.
1930	June 11	A law was accepted which established the Turkish Republic Central Bank.
1930	August 12	The Free Republican Party, the third party in the republic, was established.
1930	September 27	Sixth cabinet by İsmet İnönü
1930	October 27	Greek prime minister Venizelos visited Mustafa Kemal Atatürk in Ankara.
1930	November 17	After the Free Republican Party's cooption by radical religious groups, its leader Fethi Okyar decided to close.
1930	December 30	Kubilay was killed in an anti-republican rebellion.
1931	March 16	The first female Turkish surgeon, Dr. Suat, received her specialty.
1931	March 26	The Measurements Law was accepted, abolishing the former Arabic length and weight measurement units and replacing them with the metric system (kilogram instead of okka, meter instead of endaze, etc.)
1931	April 20	Mustafa Kemal Atatürk historically declared the slogan "Peace at home, peace in the world!"
1931	May 4	Seventh cabinet by İsmet İnönü
1931	July 25	A new press law was accepted.
1932	July 18	Turkey became a member of the League of Nations.
1932	July 31	Turkish woman Keriman Halis Ece was declared the World Beauty Queen at a contest in Belgium.
1932	November 13	Dr. Müfide Kazim became the first female Turkish government physician.
1932	December 12	Adile Ayda became the first female Turkish civil servant in the Ministry of Foreign Affairs.
1933	February 7	The first Turkish-language mosque prayers began in Istanbul.
1933	May 31	The 480-year-old Darülfünun was abolished, to be converted into Istanbul University.
1933	June	Sümerbank and Halkbank were established.
1933	October 26	Turkish women were granted the right to vote and be elected to Village Councils.
1933	November 18	Istanbul University was opened.
1933	December 1	The first five-year development plan was accepted.
1934	June 21	The Surname Law was accepted, abolishing the former titles of Bey, Efendi, Pasha, Sultan, and Hanım as of November 26.
1934	November 24	Mustafa Kemal Pasha took the surname Atatürk.
1934	November 24	The Hagia Sophia mosque was converted to the Ayasofya (Hagia Sophia) Museum.
1934	December 5	Turkish women were granted the right to vote and be elected in Turkish parliamentary elections. (Afterwards, in the first elections, 18 women were elected to the Turkish Grand National Assembly).
1935	March 1	Eight cabinet by İsmet İnönü.
1936	May 29	A law determining the size and ratios of the star and crescent in the Turkish flag was accepted.
1936	June 8	A labor law was accepted which represented the first step towards the Turkish Social Security System.
1937	January 27	Hatay's independence was accepted by the League of Nations in its Geneva meeting.
1937	June 9	A law establishing a medical faculty in Ankara was accepted.
1937	September 20	Atatürk opened the first art gallery in his residence, the Dolmabahçe Palace.
1937	October 9	Atatürk opened the Nazilli Printed Cloth Fabric Factory.
1937	October 25	Ninth cabinet by Celal Bayar, former minister of Economy
1938	November 10	The founder Mustafa Kemal Atatürk died. He was succeeded by İsmet İnönü, former prime minister and general.
1939		World War II: World War II began. Turkey was to remain neutral for most of the war, until a declaration of war against Germany at its end.
1939	July 7	The Province of Hatay joined Turkey following a rigged referendum included by the Turkish government.

== Multi-party period (1945–) ==
Year	Date	Event
1950	June 25	Korean War: The Korean War began. Turkey was a part of the joint UN operation.
1950		Müfide İlhan mayor of Mersin. First ever woman mayor in Turkey.
1952		Turkey became a NATO country strategically important in countering Soviet influence.
1953	July 27	Korean War: The war ended.
1954		Turkey began to host the USAF at the Incirlik Air Base as a deterrent to the Soviet Union.
1955	September 6	Istanbul Pogrom: The Istanbul Pogrom started the process of driving many Greeks and Christians from Turkey.
1955	September 7	Istanbul Pogrom: The pogrom drew to a close.
1960	May 27	The 1960 coup d'état took place due to the level of influence the Islamists had gained in the nation. After this clash over the "separation of religion and state/government" between İnönü's Republican People's Party and his opponents, president Celal Bayar and prime minister Adnan Menderes, both former Republican People's Party members, prime minister Adnan Menderes was held responsible and was executed with two of his ministers.
1965	October	Military rule bowed out to civilian rule, the political system was reestablished, and a new constitution was drafted that reaffirmed the "separation of religion and state/government".
1971	March 12	Military officials forced an advisory committee on the government due to the increasing anarchical situation caused by the Right (fascist/capitalist) – Left (communist) clash and ineffective policies in maintaining order. Although the military were not in charge they had significant influence.
1974		Turkey invaded Cyprus in response to a Greek-backed coup on the island. Turkey commits a genocide on the island.
1980	September 12	The 1980 coup d'état took place. Martial law was almost immediately established and a quarter of the military (about 475,000) were mobilised to settle the resistance to the coup.
1983	November 6	After the establishment of a new 1982 Constitution, the military regime dissolved itself.
1991		After the ending of the 1991 Persian Gulf War, the Incirlik Air Base enforced the northern no-fly zones in Iraq.
1999	March 24	Kosovo War: NATO interceded in the Balkans to end a civil war in the region. Turkey was part of the mission.
1999	June 10	Kosovo War: The war ended.

=== 21st century ===
Year	Date	Event
2002	June	Turkey assumed command of the International Security Assistance Force (ISAF) in Afghanistan.
2003	February	Turkey relinquished command of the ISAF.
2004	December 17	The European Union (EU) agreed to begin negotiations on the eventual accession of Turkey.
2005	February 14	Turkey assumed command of the ISAF in Afghanistan for a second time.
2005	October 3	The European Union (EU) started accession talks with Turkey. The talks did not start at the desired time due to arguments about Turkey's
