= Iphigénie Chrysochoou =

Greek writer

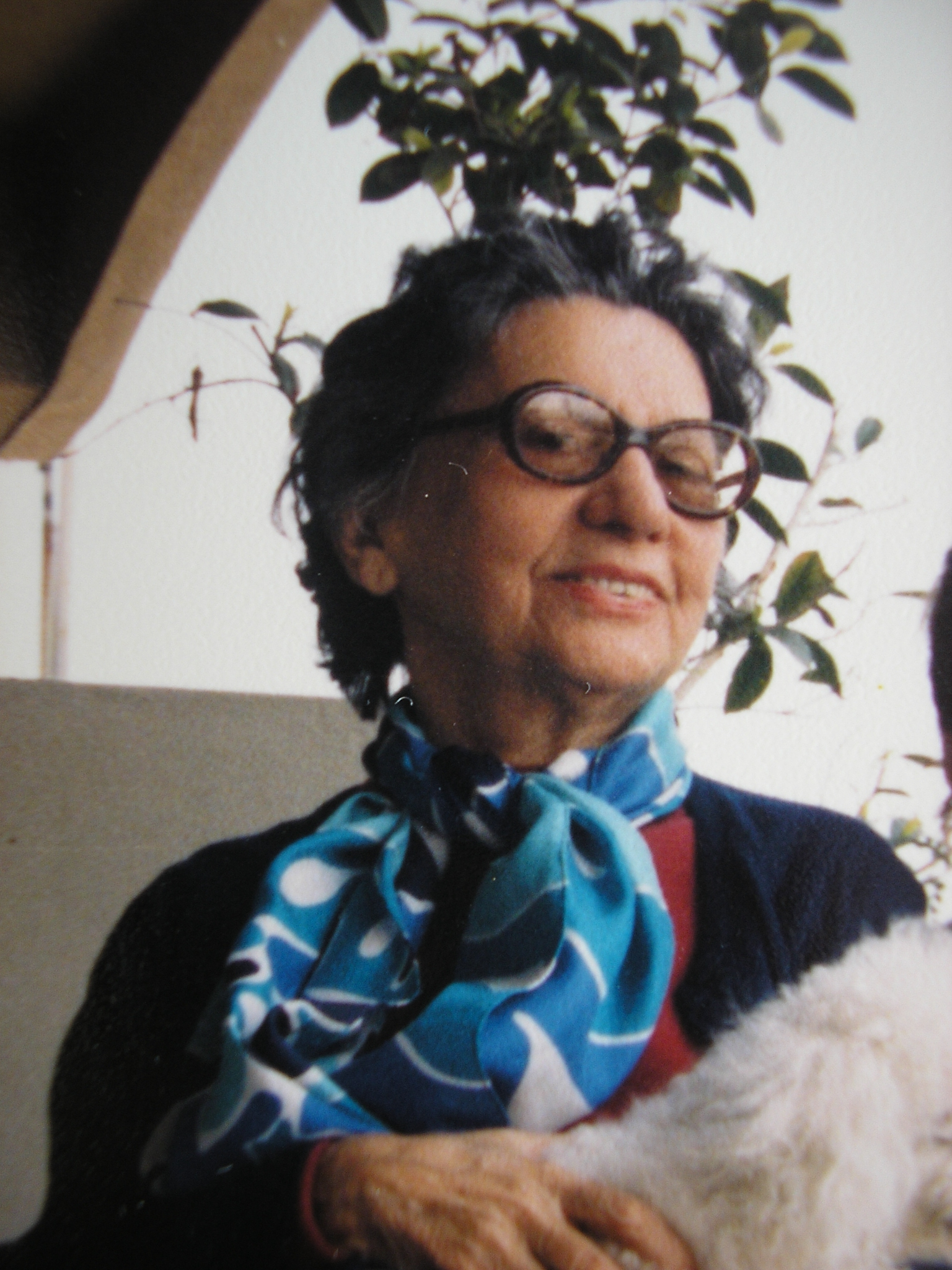
- Born: 1909; Menemen, İzmir Province, Turkey
- Died: 3 September 2008 (aged 98–99)
- Occupation: Writer

Iphigénie Chrysochoou (1909 – 3 September 2008) was a Greek writer. She produced a significant body of works across her career.

== Biography ==
Chrysochoou was born in Menemen in the Ottoman Empire in 1909. During her early life, she studied foreign language and music. In 1938 she published her first work, a personal narrative, which was published in a Macedonian journal. In addition to writing over a dozen works, Iphigénie work with in the radio industry and as a translator. She worked with a Balkans radio station in the late 1940s, and with Radio Vienna from 1951 to 1954. In recognition for her writings, Chrysochoou was awarded numerous honors in and outside of Greece; she was a member of the Union of Foreign Journalists of Austria, and was at one point the president of the Society of Greek Writers.
