= Yahşelli =

- Neighbourhood
- Location in Turkey Yahşelli (İzmir)
- Coordinates: 38°37′N 27°07′E
- Country: Turkey
- Province: İzmir
- District: Menemen
- Elevation: 35 m (115 ft)
- Population (2022): 4,718
- Time zone: UTC+3 (TRT)
- Postal code: 35660
- Area code: 0232

Yahşelli is a neighbourhood in the municipality and district of Menemen, İzmir Province, Turkey. Its population is 4,718 (2022). It is situated to the south of the Gediz River (ancient Hermus). It is 3 kilometres (2 mi) east of Menemen. The village suffered a great fire in August 2011 when more than 100 hectares of forest was burned.
