= Mustafa Fehmi Kubilay =

Turkish officer who was beheaded by Islamists in 1930

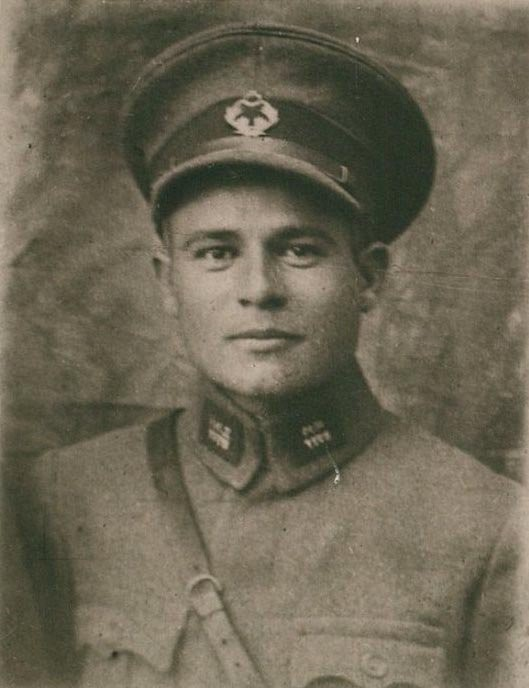
Kubilay in 1930

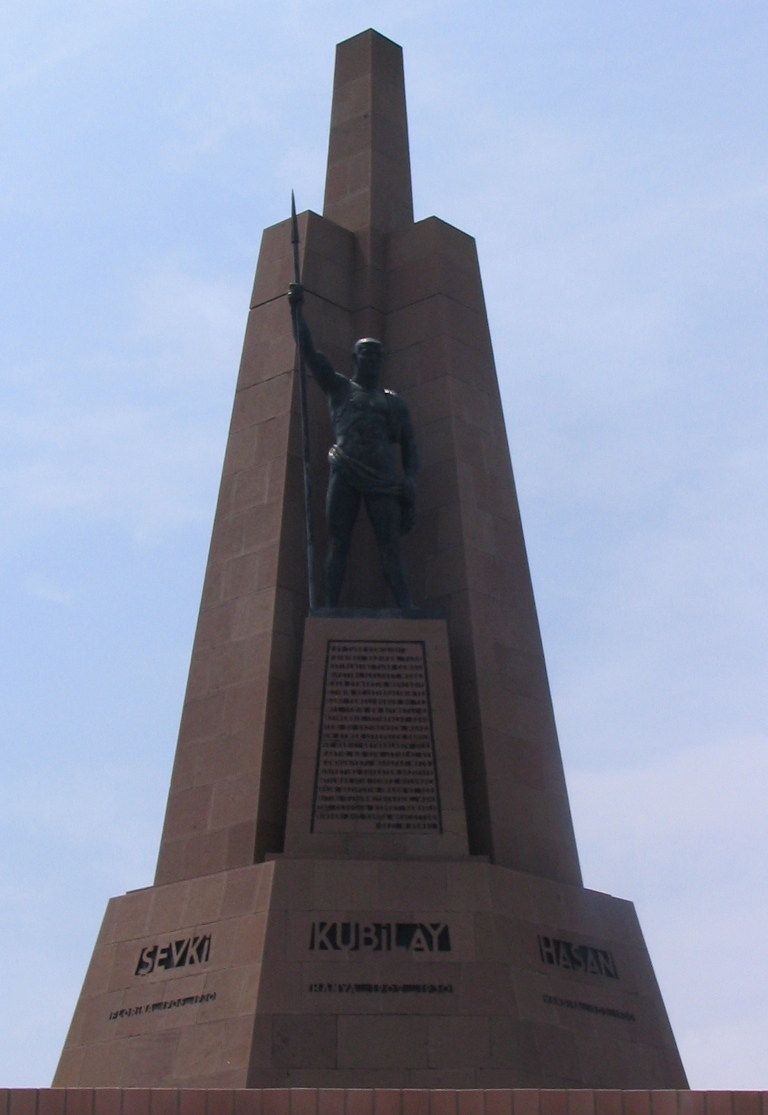
Martyr Kubilay Memorial

Mustafa Fehmi Kubilay (November 15, 1906 – December 23, 1930) was a Turkish military officer and teacher. He is a symbolic figure of the series of events known as the Kubilay Incident, which began with the killing of lieutenant Kubilay, guard Hasan, and guard Şevki by an Islamist mob in Menemen on December 23, 1930. The events continued with the trial of the perpetrators (and those considered to be involved) and spanned the months of January and February 1931.

== Biography ==
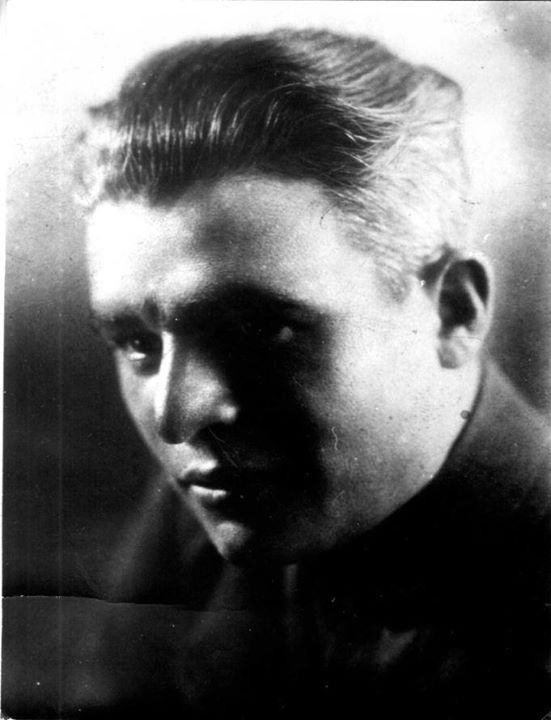
Kubilay in the 1920s

Kubilay, the son of Hüseyin and Zeynep, who were Cretan Turks, was born Mustafa Fehmi in Kozan, Adana, Ottoman Empire in 1906. His parents had fled to Turkey prior to the population exchange to escape massacres and persecution. He received his basic education in Aydın from 1913 to 1919, and began a tailors apprenticeship. During his apprenticeship he passed the examination for enrollment into teachers training, he received his teachers credentials in 1926. Mustafa Fehmi adopted a surname after graduation in accordance with Kemalist policies and chose the name Kubilay. Kubilay taught in Aydın and later at Zafer Elementary School in Menemen. He was posted in Menemen during his compulsory military service.

Kubilay was married to Fatma Vedide in a civil ceremony in Aydın. He had a son, Vedat Aktuğ.

== Kubilay Incident ==
Lieutenant Kubilay was killed and beheaded by the Naqshbandi (Turkish: Nakşibendi) order Sufi protesters after the troops he commanded fired with wooden bullets into the crowd of armed demonstrators in the Menemen Incident. Kubilay was beheaded, his head impaled on a flagstaff and was paraded around Menemen by the insurgents. The rioters, who sought the return to Sharia law and the Caliphate were all soon arrested and tried by courts-martial. Kubilay became a secular martyr for Atatürk's new republic.

== Legacy ==
Zafer Elementary School in Menemen where Kubilay taught was renamed Kubilay Elementary School (Turkish: Kubilay İlkokulu) in his honor. Kubilay Secondary School (Turkish: Kubilay Ortaokulu) in Menemen is also named in his memory.

A memorial parade is held by the army annually on 23 December at (the) Martyr Kubilay Memorial (Turkish: Şehit Kubilay Anıtı) located on a hill overlooking Menemen; in remembrance of Kubilay and the two municipal watchmen; Bekçi Hasan and Bekçi Şevki who were also killed in the incident. The monument features a tall sculpture by Ratip Aşir Acudoğlu which was erected in 1932. The Kubilay Memorial is a part of Kubilay Barracks, but open to the public. A military honor guard stands continuous watch at the memorial site, which contains the graves of several Turkish soldiers who were killed in the line of duty.
