= Menemen massacre =

Massacre during the Greco-Turkish war

- Part of the Greco-Turkish War (1919–22)
- Location of Menemen within metropolitan İzmir
- Location: Ottoman Empire, Aidin Vilayet; Present-day Menemen and İzmir Province, Turkey
- Date: 17 June 1919
- Target: Turkish people
- Attack type: Massacre
- Deaths: 100–200 killed, 200 wounded
- Perpetrator: Greek army

The Menemen massacre was a massacre of Turkish civilians by the Greek Army on 16–17 June 1919 in the town of Menemen, shortly after the Greek forces landed in nearby Smyrna, as part of the Greco-Turkish War (1919–1922).

== Background ==
=== Kaza of Menemen and Events in the District Prior to the Greek Occupation ===
The town of Menemen was a district (kaza) located in the Aydın Vilayet, bordering the settlements of Manisa, Çandarlı, and Foça, and situated 23 kilometers north of Smyrna.

Prior to the events, Menemen was a multicultural district where Turks constituted the majority, alongside Greek, Jewish, Armenian, and small Bulgarian communities. During the 1914 Greek deportations, Menemen's Greeks were targeted and suffered from widespread attacks by Turkish irregulars, including destruction, looting, displacement and killings.

Ethnic / Religious Group	1914 Official Census	1917 Statistics
Muslims	21,433	22,354
Greeks	8,058	4,049
Jews	425	425
Armenians	146	143
Bulgarians / Foreigners	51 (Bulgarians)	51 (Foreigners)
Total	30,113	27,022

=== The Greek Occupation in the City ===
Greek troops entered Menemen on 21 or 22 May 1919 (Ottoman records cited by historians differ on the date). No Ottoman troops were stationed there, and the occupation met no organized armed resistance. Some local Greeks and Turkish supporters of the Freedom and Accord Party welcomed the soldiers, while other Turkish residents largely stayed indoors. District Governor (kaymakam) Kemal Bey urged calm and arranged for the surrender of civilian weapons. the Greek military redistributed them to the local Greek civilians.

On 17 June, after Greek troops withdrew from Pergamos, in the midst of the Battle of Bergama and fighting with Turkish irregulars, soldiers regrouping at Menemen killed Turkish civilians. The Inter-Allied Commission, headed by Mark L. Bristol, rejected both prearrangement and an order from Greek command for the massacre, attributing the unprovoked killings to exhausted, inexperienced soldiers affected by the battle and to officers who failed to restrain them. Greek refugees tried to return to those districts abandoned by the Turks, but the Greek authorities halted mass repatriation.

Some younger Greeks favoured attacks, whereas older residents and certain community figures opposed them. Those seeking to protect Turkish inhabitants included Nikolaki Efendi, deputy to the Greek Orthodox metropolitan, the local Greek commander and Anonya Efendi, affiliated with the Metropolitan and Synagogue Council.Accounts also describe Turks receiving help and warnings from Greek friends and Nikolaki Efendi being threatened and harassed for opposing attacks, followed by requests for his transfer. Accounts differ over the precise opening of the attack, although witnesses agreed that shootings and killings spread through the town.

== Killings ==
The Ottoman district governor of Menemen, Kemal Bey, and six gendarmes were among those killed by Greek soldiers. The Greek occupation commander told an investigating delegation that Kemal Bey and others had been killed by mistake in a firefight after Greek troops came under fire. Colonel Alexandros Mazarakis-Ainian subsequently cited testimony by twenty witnesses, in which they stated that shots were fired from the government building and Hassan Azap's house.

It is estimated that 100–200 people were killed and 200 more were injured. Greek Prime Minister Eleftherios Venizelos gave lower figures, reporting 17–20 killed and 20 wounded. Colonel Alexandros Mazarakis-Ainian, the Greek representative to the Inter-Allied Commission, cited investigations estimating around 40 victims. The Greek military also claimed that they were attacked in the town, but the commission did not give credit to this particular claim.

On the other hand, at Pergamos, the Turkish irregulars who had temporarily entered the city, had already murdered the Turkish inhabitants who had previously welcomed the Greeks, and massacred and tortured their Greek prisoners of war.

== Aftermath ==
The events were protested by the Ottoman Shaykh al-Islām. Greek High Commissioner Aristidis Stergiadis sent a public prosecutor to Menemen to investigate and arrest suspects, with Greek officers held responsible for the events receiving severe penalties. On 24 June 1919, Stergiadis reported to the Greek delegation in Paris that he had taken steps to return looted property and punish those responsible. On 30 June, Venizelos demanded explanations from Stergiadis and ordered sanctions against those responsible, stressing that the army and administration must treat the Turkish population in a civilized manner.

Historian Benny Morris and Dror Ze'evi note that: "The [Inter-Allied] commission made no mention of some 3,000 Aydın Greeks— men, women, and children—allegedly murdered, nor of 800 women and children deported inland", considering it to have been biased against Greeks overall. Historian Heinz A. Richter agrees, also stating that the Commission's report exaggerated reports of Greek excesses and showed biased anti-Greek tendencies.

== See also ==
- Greco-Turkish War (1919–1922)
- List of massacres during the Greco-Turkish War (1919–22)
