= Menemen =

- District and municipality
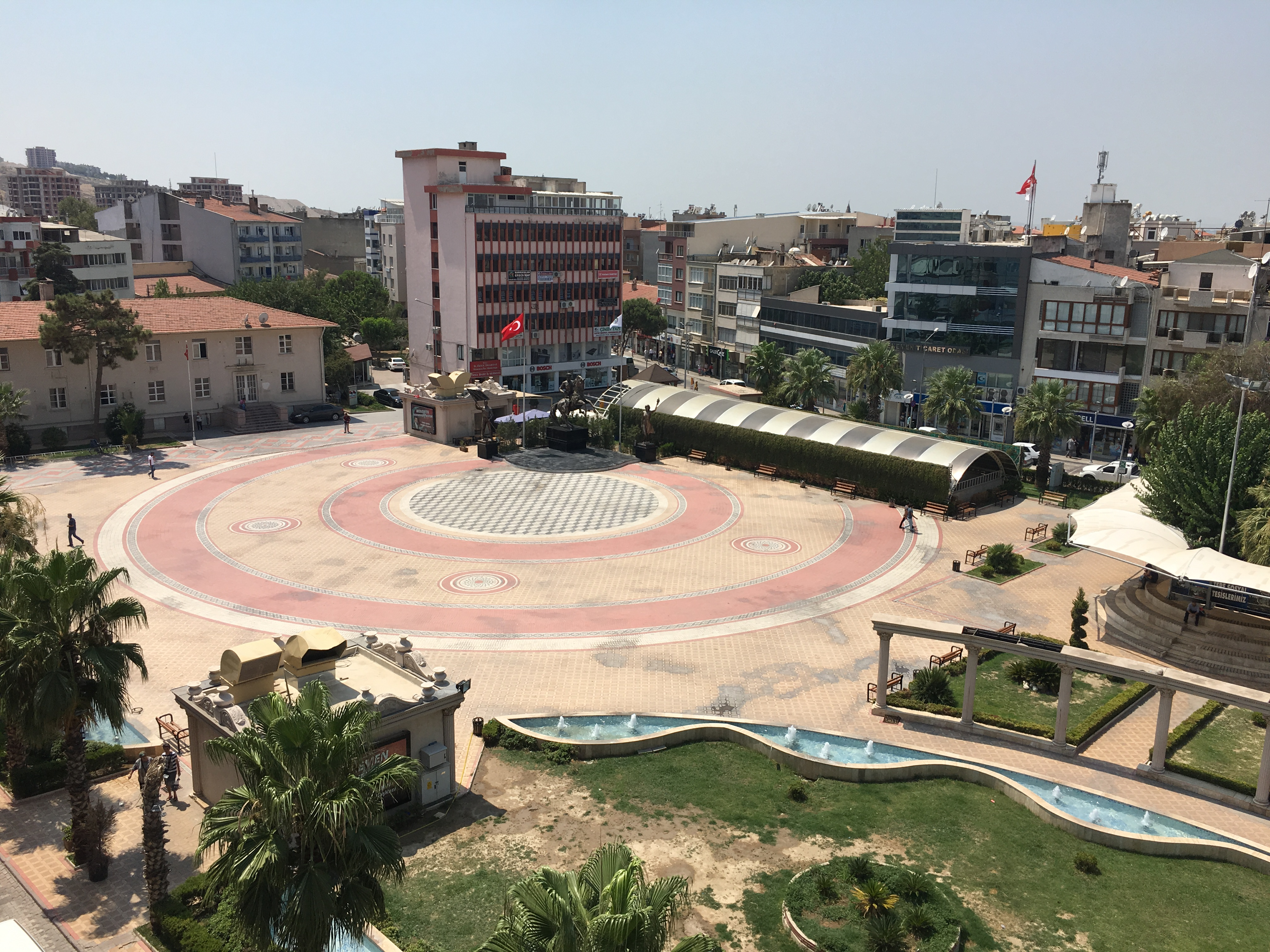
- Republic Square in Menemen

- Logo

- Map showing Menemen District in İzmir Province

- Location within Turkey Location within İzmir
- Coordinates: 38°36′N 27°04′E
- Country: Turkey
- Province: İzmir

Government
  - Mayor: Aydın Pehlivan (AKP)
- Area: 573 km^{2} (221 sq mi)
- Population (2022): 200,904
  - Density: 351/km^{2} (908/sq mi)
- Time zone: UTC+3 (TRT)
- Postal code: 35660
- Area code: 0232
- Website: www.menemen.bel.tr

Menemen (Turkish: [meˈnemæn]) is a municipality and district of İzmir Province, Turkey. Its area is 573 km^{2}, and its population is 200,904 (2022). The district extends on a fertile plain formed by the alluvial soil carried by the Gediz River. Adjacent districts are, from east to west; Aliağa and Foça to the north and Bornova, Karşıyaka and Çiğli to the south. Menemen district has a 27 km (17 mi) long coastline in the west and neighbors Manisa Province to the east. The town of Menemen is located at a distance of 35 km (22 mi) from İzmir center (Konak Square).

== Etymology ==
There are different accounts related to the historical origin of the Greek-derived name of "Menemen" (Μενεμένη or Μαινεμένη in Greek language). The most commonly encountered explanation is based on the ancient Greek word mainómenos (μαινόμενος "furious, raving, out of one's mind"), which refers to a Greek Mythology story when Herakles went out of his mind for which Euripides wrote the play "Herakles Mainomenos" (Greek: Ἡρακλῆς μαινόμενος). In addition, "meneménos" (μενεμένος) meant "flood" or "overflow". In the absence of modern dams and other means of waterflow control in antiquity, the Hermos River (now Gediz River) used to cause serious and frequent damage in the valley until recent times. The river was nicknamed in Turkish "Gediz the Sorceress" (Cadı Gediz).

On the other hand, a minority of researchers discuss the possibility of a Luwian origin for the name.

In any case, it is obvious, particularly in the light of recent discoveries made at the premises of Ege Fertilizer (Ege Gübre; the site being termed in the literature under the name of the industrial installations), at Araptepe and more particularly at Panaztepe and Menemen's Larissa, that settlement in the region extends far back in prehistoric times, at least until the late Neolithic and early Chalcolithic.

== Settlement and population ==
The town of Menemen is located at a distance of 35 km (22 mi) from İzmir center (Konak Square). Settlement across the district is loosely scattered along the Greater Metropolitan Area of İzmir in the south and consists of isolated villages along prairies in the north, which results in an average urbanization rate of only 42 per cent.

With a population of around 136,000, Menemen is the fifth most populous district in İzmir Province, in a ranking that includes İzmir's metropolitan municipalities and this indicates Menemen's degree of prominence within its province. Considering the district population stood at slight above a hundred thousand in 2000, it can be deducted that Menemen and especially the center town has a high rate of population increase. The determining factor in this increase was the immigration the region received from Turkey's Eastern Anatolia region in the 2000s, especially from such towns as Bulanık, Karayazı, Malazgirt, Midyat, Diyadin, Patnos and Akyaka, Kars according to a report, cited below, prepared on the district.

Menemen has, aside from the district center, eight settlements with their own municipalities. The number of depending villages displayed variations in recent times, a result of development and human movements among others, many former villages having been attached to the district center as its neighborhoods, and new villages having been officially constituted at localities where there were mere hamlets previously or some neighborhood saw their previous status of villages accorded back. The count stood at twenty villages at the end of 2005.

There are 22,100 residences in all in Menemen district. The number of pupils per teacher is 19 and the number of patients per doctor is 1,241.

== Economy ==
The economy still relies on agriculture and stock breeding in large part, although the production and export of leather, ceramic and other earthenware products, as well as potentially of plastic products, based in two separate and specialized organized industrial zones made important steps forward during the last decade. Menemen's earthenware pottery products have been famous across Turkey for centuries. These two organized industrial zones as well as activities rebounding from the adjacent İzmir metropolitan area gain an increasing importance in the district's economy. Nevertheless, Gediz River, whose lower basin crosses Menemen plain to join the sea within the district boundaries still constitutes the lifeline of the region and matters relating to the river's flow as well as its present rate of rather high pollution is a matter of constant debate.

Menemen's yearly per capita income was calculated as 3870 US Dollars in 2006, slightly below the national average despite the region's fertility and its closeness to İzmir center, a rate which could partially be accounted by the high rate of migration Menemen received in recent decades especially from Eastern Anatolia. The district realized exports reaching ten million US Dollars in the same year. Much expected boost to Menemen's economy by the plastic products industrial zone is yet to materialize and the sales made by the district within and beyond Turkey still rely largely on a handful of agricultural and dairy products, such as dried tomatoes, dry raisins, pickled products and yogurt, and to two items of industrial products, namely leather and ceramics and other earthenware products. The total number of enterprises in Menemen was 10,723 the same year of 2006. Seven banks provide services through seven branches across Menemen district.

Underground riches include andesite, basalt and marble. Drinking water obtained from sources at Mount Yamanlar south of Menemen, and sold under brand names associated with the mountain are also very popular across İzmir region as a whole.

== Composition ==
There are 65 neighbourhoods in Menemen District:

- 29 Ekim
- Ahihıdır
- Alaniçi
- Asarlık Gölcük
- Asarlık İncirlipınar
- Asarlık Irmak
- Asarlık Yeşilpınar
- Asarlık Zeytinlik
- Atatürk
- Ayvacık
- Bağcılar
- Belen
- Bozalan
- Buruncuk
- Çaltı
- Camikebir
- Çavuş
- Çukurköy
- Doğa
- Emialem Değirmendere
- Emiralem Kır
- Emiralem Merkez
- Emiralem Yayla
- Esatpaşa
- Gaybi
- Gazi Mustafa Kemal
- Göktepe
- Görece
- Hasanlar
- Hatundere
- Haykıran
- İğnedere
- İsmet Inönü
- İstiklal
- Karaorman
- Kasımpaşa
- Kazımpaşa
- Kesik
- Koyundere Atatürk
- Koyundere Cumhuriyet
- Koyundere Gazi
- Koyundere Ulus
- Maltepe Cumhuriyet
- Mermerli
- Musabey
- Mustafa Kemal Atatürk
- Seydinasrullah
- Seyrek Cumhuriyet
- Seyrek Günerli
- Seyrek İnönü
- Seyrek Süzbeyli
- Seyrek Tuzçullu
- Seyrek Villakent
- Süleymanlı
- Telekler
- Tülbentli
- Turgutlar
- Türkelli Fatih
- Türkelli Yıldırım
- Uğur Mumcu
- Ulukent 30 Ağustos
- Ulukent Dokuz Eylül
- Yahşelli
- Yanıkköy
- Zafer

== Transportation ==
Menemen is serviced by the E87 roadway, and is railroad is serviced by TCDD. The Menemen Railway Station has 7 passenger trains daily.

== Sights of interest ==
Historical vestiges of Menemen occupy a small area in the old neighborhood of the town, marked by the recently restored Taşhan (literally the stone caravanserai) whose precise date of construction is unknown but is thought to have been built end-16th or early-17th century. A covered bazaar (bedesten) faces Taşhan and is still awaiting restoration. A few shrines-tombs in the Turkish style dating from mid-Ottoman centuries near Taşhan, two old mosques, a number of old houses, as well as the abandoned remains of what is likely to have been the town synagogue complete the picture. In nearby Hıdırtepe, slightly outside the popular quarter of Menemen characterized by low single-storeyed houses with gardens, typical for the climate of the plain, is another Ottoman shrine as well as the memorial area dedicated to Mustafa Fehmi Kubilay in a military zone open to visitors and occupying the summit of the hill, with tombs and a renowned high statue.

== History ==
A late Bronze Age settlement in Panaztepe with a number of tholos tombs indicates an apparent Mycenaean influence. The first nucleus of Menemen was formed on the left bank of the River Gediz in the immediate vicinity of today's Yahşelli village. This settlement dates back to 1000 B.C. and is on the natural fluvial frontier between Ionia and Aeolia of antiquity. It is believed that the settlement was moved from its former place to today's Asarlık village between 263 and 241 B.C. and later to its actual place during the Turkish principalities era in Anatolia (13th-14th centuries).

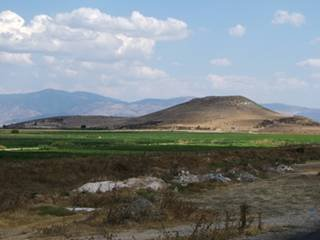
Panaztepe site (Bronze Age and later) between Menemen and the coast

The city was founded by Greek settlers and the region was first under Greek political influence and later came under the rule of Phrygian Kingdom. The region was taken over by the Lydians and their rule lasted between 676 and 546 B.C. until the commencement of the Persian rule in the western Anatolia after the defeat suffered by the Lydians in the face of the famous Persian King Cyrus.

As the Persian Empire collapsed after a series of definitive defeats against the Macedonians, the region became a part of Alexander's Empire. After Alexander's death in 323 B.C. Menemen and its environs had been ruled by the Pergamon Kingdom.

In 64 B.C. the region became a part of the Roman Empire. Later, with the division of the Roman territory into two independent states in 395 A.C., it came under the Byzantine rule with the rest of the eastern Roman provinces.

With the commencement of the Turkish rule in Anatolia after the Battle of Manzikert (Malazgirt) (1071 A.C.), the region became a part of the Seljuk Empire in 1084 A.C. But the Seljuk rule was frequently interrupted by the Crusades which had a devastating influence on both Byzantine and Seljuk territories in Asia Minor.

With the decadence of Seljuks in the last quarter of the 13th century, local feudal lords had founded several principalities on the Anatolian territory. The Beylik of Saruhan, founded around Manisa, captured the site of Menemen together with Foça and its surroundings in 1313. At the moment of the Turkish conquest, Menemen didn't exist as a town: it was only the center of the domanial complex the aristocratic Byzantine family of Tarchaneiotes possessed in the area. But it seems that under the Saruhanoglu its emergence as a locality was relatively fast. As a reminder of its origin, this new locality was called Tarhaniyat, and this alternative name survived for a long time, as the Ottoman documentation shows, in particular census registers.

But the Saruhan rule on Menemen did not last too long as the new emerging power in Anatolia, the Ottomans took over the city in the last quarter of the 14th century during the reign of Bayezid I the Thunderbolt.

As Timur invaded Anatolia following the Battle of Ankara in 1402, the Ottoman state was dismembered and the Saruhan Principality took over the region once more until a definitive annexation to Ottoman territory in 1425 during the reign of Murad II.

At least under the end of the 18th century, Menemen was one of the important traditional centers of production of textiles and clothing in western Anatolia, advantaged by its location right in the middle of a region where cotton was cultivated in a large scale. Its fabrics, and particularly those called the "demite", "demiton" and "escamite" were much sought after, notably as export products in overseas markets

From 1867 until 1922, Menemen was part of the Aydin Vilayet of the Ottoman Empire with its seat in İzmir.

=== Early 20th century ===
In 1914, the local Greek population in the area was affected by the violent ethnic cleansing campaign of the Ottoman state, while Ottoman irregular bands and bashi-bazouks, assisted by some Cretan Muslims, were looting and murdering local Greeks, looting villages south of Menemen. In Serekieuy, Menemen district, the Greek villagers were killed by these irregulars, after attempting to form some kind of resistance. A few escaped to the town of Menemen, which had a population of 20.000, the Bashi-bazouks shot who left the town but didn't attack the town itself.

After World War I Greek troops landed at Smyrna and advanced inland during the Greco-Turkish War (1919-1922). After the battle at Bergama retreating Greek army units managed to enter Menemen as part of the Greek occupation zone of Smyrna. However, they had to retreat temporarily from the town after fierce Turkish resistance during which excesses were committed by both sides. The subsequent massacre, on 17 June 1919, due to these developments, resulted in 200 Turkish civilians being killed and 200 others being wounded by the Greeks, while Turkish sources themselves claim 1000 dead. The events were protested by the Ottoman Sheikhulislam. The Greek military claimed that they were attacked in the town, on the other hand an Allied commission, after investigation, believed that their statements was not correct and found the Greeks alone responsible for the bloodshed, however they agreed that the massacre was not organized by the Greek Command, but was as a result of the panic and anger of the young Greek troops who were still affected by the Bergama events and whom their officers were not able to calm.

The city was recaptured, three years later on 9 September 1922 by the Turkish Army, during the Greco-Turkish War (1919-1922). The Greek inhabitants of the town had to leave Menemen late in 1923 and in 1924 under the agreement for the Exchange of Greek and Turkish Populations between the two countries according to which Turkish immigrants from different parts of Greece were later lodged in town.

=== Menemen Incident ===
On December 23, 1930, Dervish Mehmed, a Cretan Muslim Sufi and self-proclaimed prophet, arrived in Menemen with six followers in an attempt to incite rebellion against the secular government and reestablish Islamic law. Mehmed and his enthusiastic supporters overwhelmed the local army garrison and killed the commander, Lieutenant Mustafa Fehmi Kubilay. Kubilay's severed head was put on a pole and paraded through the town. The army soon regained control, killing Mehmed and several of his followers.

The young Turkish Republic considered the incident a serious threat against secular reform. After a series of trials, 37 people were sentenced to death and later hanged in the town square; and several others were sent to prison. In 1932 a monument was erected in Menemen to commemorate the incident.

=== 21st century ===
In May 2015, the Greek Church "Agios Konstantinos" has reopened and held a mass for first time in 93 years.

== Notable people ==
- Kaymakam Kemal Bey (d. 1919), Ottoman governor
- Iphigenia Chrysochoou (1909–2008), Greek writer
- Attilâ İlhan (1925–2005), Turkish poet, novelist, journalist and reviewer
- Çağlar Söyüncü (b. 1996), Turkish footballer
- Harun Tekin (b. 1989), Turkish footballer

== Twinnings ==
- (Greece) Menemeni, a suburb in Thessaloniki

== See also ==
- Menemen Gediz Bridge
