= Ratip Aşir Acudoğlu =

Turkish sculptor

Ratip Aşir Acudoğlu (also known as Ratip Aşir Acudoğu; 1898 – 17 January 1957) was a Turkish sculptor.

Acudoğlu was a student of Ihsan Özsoy in Fine Arts Academy of Istanbul. He also studied in Akademie der Bildenden Künste of Munich and Académie Julian of Paris. He returned to Turkey in 1928 and worked as an art teacher at Edirne Teachers' College.
