= Treaty of Nasuh Pasha =

Treaty between the Ottoman Empire and Safavid Iran after the war of 1603–1612

Treaty of Nasuh Pasha (Persian: عهدنامه نصوح پاشا, Turkish: Nasuh Paşa Antlaşması) was a treaty between the Ottoman Empire and Safavid Iran signed on 20 November 1612. It was made after a decisive Safavid victory in the war of 1603–1612. The main terms in the treaty included granting back Safavid suzerainty over all of the Caucasus.

== Background ==
In 1590, Shah Abbas I of Iran (r. 1587–1629) had been forced to concede vast areas in Northwest Iran and the Caucasus to the Ottoman Empire by the Treaty of Constantinople. After solving problems at home, Shah Abbas planned to regain his losses and waited for a suitable moment to attack. He saw his chance in 1603 when 14 years old sultan Ahmet I ascended the Ottoman throne. The Ottoman Empire was engaged in a long and costly war against the Holy Roman Empire, the so called Long war (1593–1606), and there were a series of revolts in Anatolia called the Celali rebellions.

== The war ==
In a surprise attack, Shah Abbas and his general Allahverdi Khan began to regain the territories lost in 1590. Although the Ottomans were able to raise an army against the Safavids, their two commanders (serdars), Cığalazade Yusuf Sinan Pasha (1605) and Kuyucu Murad Pasha (1611), both died of natural causes in Diyarbakır, the winter camp of the army. Therefore, the Ottoman army suffered from the lack of able commandership. Finally, Grand vizier Nasuh Pasha who became the grand vizier in 1611, agreed to sign a treaty.

== The terms ==
1. The Ottoman Empire agreed to return all territory gained by the 1590 treaty of Constantinople.
2. The border line became the line drawn in the 1555 Peace of Amasya.
3. In turn the Safavid Empire agreed to pay an annual tribute of 200 loads (59000 kilograms) of silk.
4. The route of Iranian pilgrims to Haj was changed (over Syria instead of Iraq).

== Aftermath ==
This treaty is the first treaty in Ottoman history by which the empire agreed to lose territory. (The first treaty in European theater in which the empire agreed to lose territory would be the Treaty of Karlowitz in 1699). On the other hand, this treaty was a huge success for Shah Abbas as he had increased his realm and restored Safavid prestige. However, Shah Abbas refused to pay the tribute and the war was renewed in 1615.
